= JAC Group =

Chinese automobile and commercial vehicle manufacturer

Anhui Jianghuai Automobile Group Corp., Ltd.

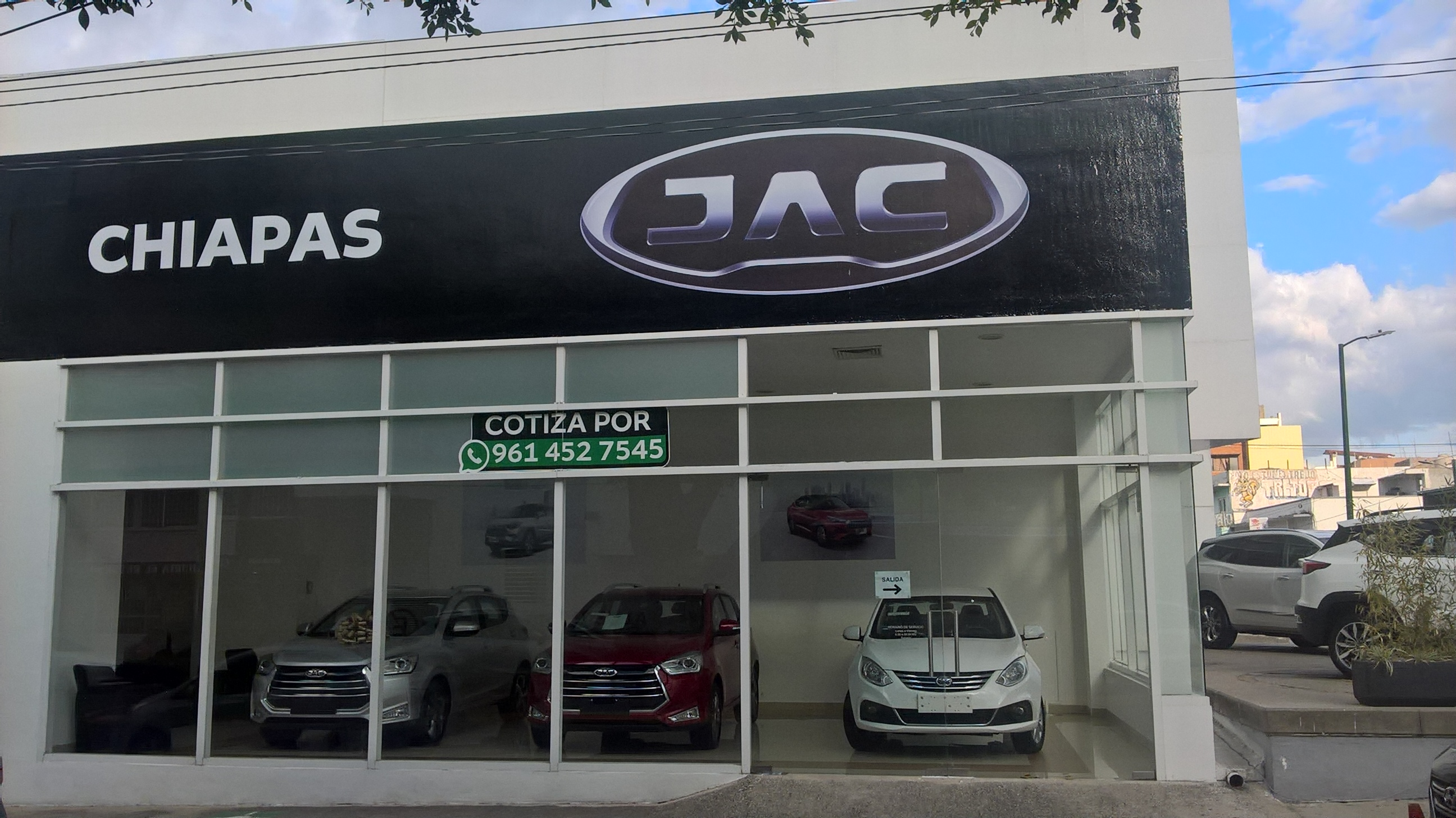
- JAC showroom in Tuxtla Gutiérrez, Mexico (2021)
- Trade name: JAC Motors
- Formerly: Hefei Jianghuai Automobile
- Type: State-owned Public
- Traded as: SSE: 600418
- Industry: Automotive
- Founded: 1964; 62 years ago (as Hefei Jianghuai Automobile)
- Headquarters: Hefei, Anhui, China
- Area served: Worldwide
- Key people: Xiang Xingchu (项兴初, Chairman and President)
- Products: Passenger cars Trucks; Buses; Automotive components
- Owner: JAG
- Subsidiaries: JAC-Navistar Diesel (50%); Volkswagen Anhui (25%)

Chinese name
- Traditional Chinese: 安徽江淮汽車集團股份有限公司
- Simplified Chinese: 安徽江淮汽车集团股份有限公司
Transcriptions
- Website: jac.com.cn

JAC Group (Chinese: 江汽集团; officially Anhui Jianghuai Automobile Group Corp., Ltd.) is a Chinese automobile and commercial vehicle manufacturer. The company is based in Hefei, China.

== History ==
Established in 1964 as Hefei Jianghuai Automobile Factory, its name was changed to Anhui Jianghuai Automobile Co., Ltd. in 1997. The company went public on the Shanghai Stock Exchange in 2001.

JAC has historically only produced commercial trucks under the brand name Jianghu, but released multi-purpose vehicles (MPV) and sports utility vehicles (SUV) in the 2000s. By 2007, the company had gained government approval for passenger car production but continued to manufacture predominately trucks. Prior to the acquisition of a passenger car license, JAC cooperated with Hyundai Motor Company in the early 2000s in an attempt to expand its product line. Starting in 2003, the company assembled Hyundai MPVs, although this stopped before 2007. At least two models based on Hyundai technology continued to be made by JAC after the collaboration halted–an MPV and a SUV. Hyundai reportedly explored setting up a joint venture with the company in 2004.

In 2009, the Chinese government indicated that it supported consolidation in the Chinese auto industry, leading analysts to predict the possibility of JAC joining with Chery since they are both located in Anhui province. However, JAC confirmed that it was not interested in consolidation. JAC has begun to concentrate more on passenger cars, and a 2010 announcement of a new electric vehicle program may—at least partially—have been an effort to stave off the rumored merger.

Sales reached more than 445,000 units in 2012.

In 2013 it was one of the top ten most-productive vehicle manufacturers in China selling 458,500 units for 2.5% market share and reaching eighth place. JAC dropped one spot to ninth in 2011 making nearly 500,000 vehicles, and in 2012 a fall in units produced to about 445,000 precipitated the company's moving down one more rung to tenth place. Estimated production capacity is over 500,000 units/year as of 2009.

In 2014, JAC Motors announced its full acquisition of JAC Group. The new company was traded as JAC Motors in the stock market but operated in the name of JAC Group.

In 2016, JAC entered into an agreement with DR Automobiles to export its vehicles to Italy. JAC models made in China will be re-approved according to European safety and anti-pollution regulations by DR and sold with the DR badge. The first cars imported into Italy were the JAC Refine S3 renamed DR4 (or EVO 4) and the JAC iEV40 sold as the DR Evo Electric (or EVO 3 Electric).

=== Cooperation with Volkswagen ===
In 2017, JAC and Volkswagen Group announced a joint venture to produce electric cars for the Chinese market with the SEAT brand. In April 2018, the JAC-Volkswagen joint venture was officially born, which however operates through the new Sol brand, and no longer SEAT. The first product is the SOL E20X vehicle, an electric crossover resulting from a badge engineering of the JAC iEV40 (also called JAC Refine S2 EV) with a front redesigned by the SEAT style center in Spain.

In 2020, Volkswagen Group signed letters of intent between Volkswagen (China) Investment Co. Ltd. and the Government of Anhui Province for the increase of the Volkswagen Group's stake in the JAC Volkswagen joint venture from the current 50% to 75%. This transition also requires investment in JAG (JAC Holding Group), the parent company of JAC and owned by the Anhui Government. The agreement between the parties, subject to the usual regulatory approvals, provides for the investment of an amount equal to one billion euros and should be concluded by the end of the year. Volkswagen would also acquire 50% of JAG (the parent company of JAC).

Volkswagen Group holds a 75% share of Volkswagen Anhui while JAC Group holds a 25% share. Volkswagen Group also owned 50% of JAC Holding Group (JAG), the parent company of JAC Group, which means Volkswagen Group also owns a 14.09% stake of JAC Group. As a result, the ownership percentage held by Volkswagen Group in Volkswagen Anhui actually reaches 78.52%.

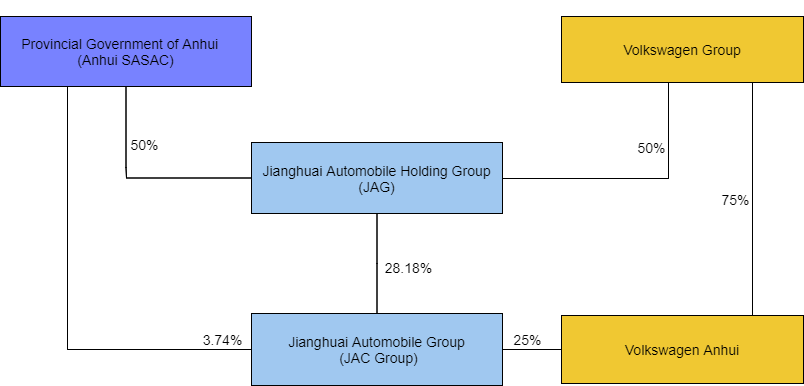
The structure of JAC Group in 2023

=== OEM for NIO ===
In April 2016, NIO and the JAC Group signed a manufacturing cooperation agreement, preliminarily confirming a production and sales target of 50,000 vehicles per year for 5 years.

In 2018, NIO's first mass-produced model, the NIO ES8, manufactured by JAC, was officially launched.

In March 2021, NIO and the JAC Group established Jianglai Advanced Manufacturing Technology (Anhui) Co., Ltd., with each party holding a 50% stake in the joint venture. In the same month, both companies agreed to extend the contract of manufacturing to May 2024. As part of the agreement renewal, NIO paid JAC CNY 1.2 billion for the extension of contract manufacturing services.

In December 2023, NIO announced the acquisition of JAC factories manufacturing NIO vehicles at the price of CNY 3.158 billion, which marked the end of NIO as an original equipment manufacturer (OEM).

As of 2022, the total amount paid for contract manufacturing services reached a total of CNY 3.038 billion.

On January 11, 2024, JAC signed a strategic cooperation framework agreement with NIO to establish cooperation in battery standards, battery swapping technology, the construction of battery swapping service networks, and operation.

=== Partnership with Huawei ===
In December 2023, JAC announced that it had signed a cooperation agreement with Huawei. The two parties collaborated in manufacturing, sales, and services to develop premium electric vehicles based on Huawei's intelligent automotive solutions.

In August 2024, at the Stelato S9 launch conference, Huawei officially announced the fourth brand under Harmony Intelligent Mobility Alliance (HIMA) collaborating with JAC, specifically Maextro (Chinese: 尊界). Their first vehicle, the Maextro S800 is scheduled to roll off the production line by the end of 2024 and launch in the first half of 2025.

=== Collaboration with Wrightbus ===
On 29 January 2025, Northern Irish bus manufacturer Wrightbus entered into truck manufacturing in collaboration with the JAC Group under the 'Rightech' sub-brand. The manufacturer launched the Rightech RT75, a 7.5 tonnes (7.4 long tons; 8.3 short tons) battery electric box truck based on the JAC Junling but modified with a revised front grille, which can be specified at either a 3.85 metres (12.6 ft) or 4.48 metres (14.7 ft) wheelbase. The vehicle is also available in both left-hand and right-hand drive variants for the UK and European truck markets.

=== Maextro–Maserati partnership ===
In November 2026, it was reported that JAC, Huawei, and Maserati will collaborate to manufacture two models, a mid-size electric SUV and a full-size electric GT. The vehicles will be built at JAC's Maextro factory. Maserati will be responsible for exterior design and chassis tuning. The vehicles will be sold under Maextro marque in China, while carry the Maserati badge in oversea market. The mass production planned for the fourth quarter of 2027.

== Brands ==
=== Maextro ===
Maextro (Chinese: 尊界; pinyin: Zūnjiè) brand is used for Huawei's collaboration with JAC Group.

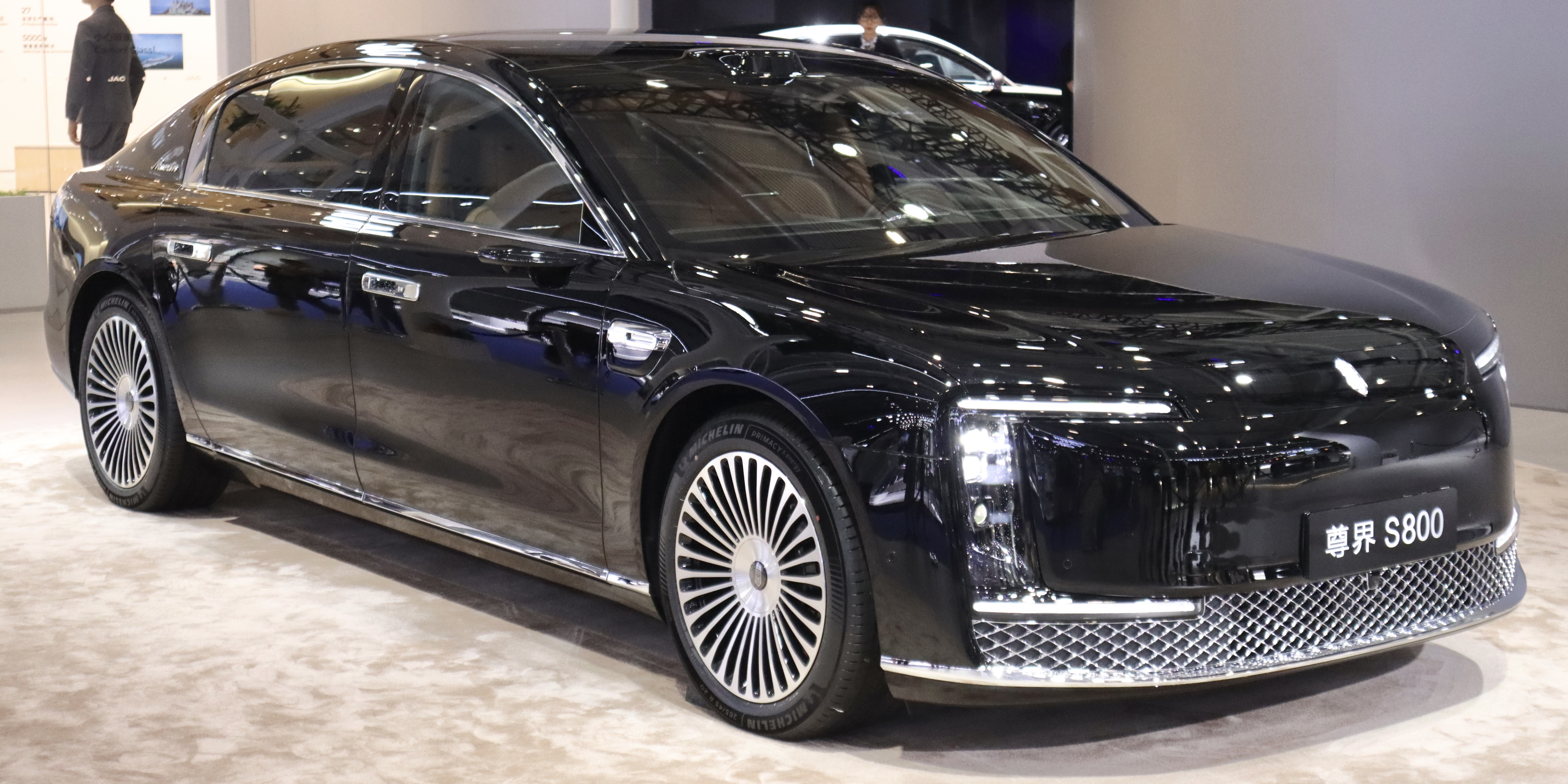
Maextro S800

Maextro V800

=== JAC ===
JAC has gone through multiple transitions during the last decades. Originally, JAC had several product lines. The Heyue for sedans, hatchbacks, MPVs, and SUVs, the Refine for large MPVs/minivans and vans.

In 2017, the Heyue series was discontinued and the final models were replaced by electric variants.

In 2019, a new series, Jiayue, was introduced. Multiple Refine vehicles have been facelifted and moved to this series.

In 2020, JAC started to rebadge JAC Jiayue series models to the Sehol brand, resulting in the Sehol A5, Sehol X4, and Sehol X7. The rebadge was done as a move to release all sedans and SUVs under the Sehol brand. However, in 2023, JAC announced a plan to phase out the Sehol brand in the future. As a result, several Sehol models, like QX, A5 and X8, were again rebadged back to the JAC brand.

- JAC A5 Plus (2023–present), compact sedan, rebadged Sehol A5 Plus
- JAC QX PHEV (2023–present), compact SUV, rebadged Sehol QX
- JAC X8 Plus (2023–present), mid-size SUV, rebadged Sehol X8
- JAC iEV7 (2014–present), BEV variant of Heyue A20
- JAC iEVA50 (2018–present), compact sedan, BEV variant of Heyue, also rebadged as JAC Yiwei Aipao
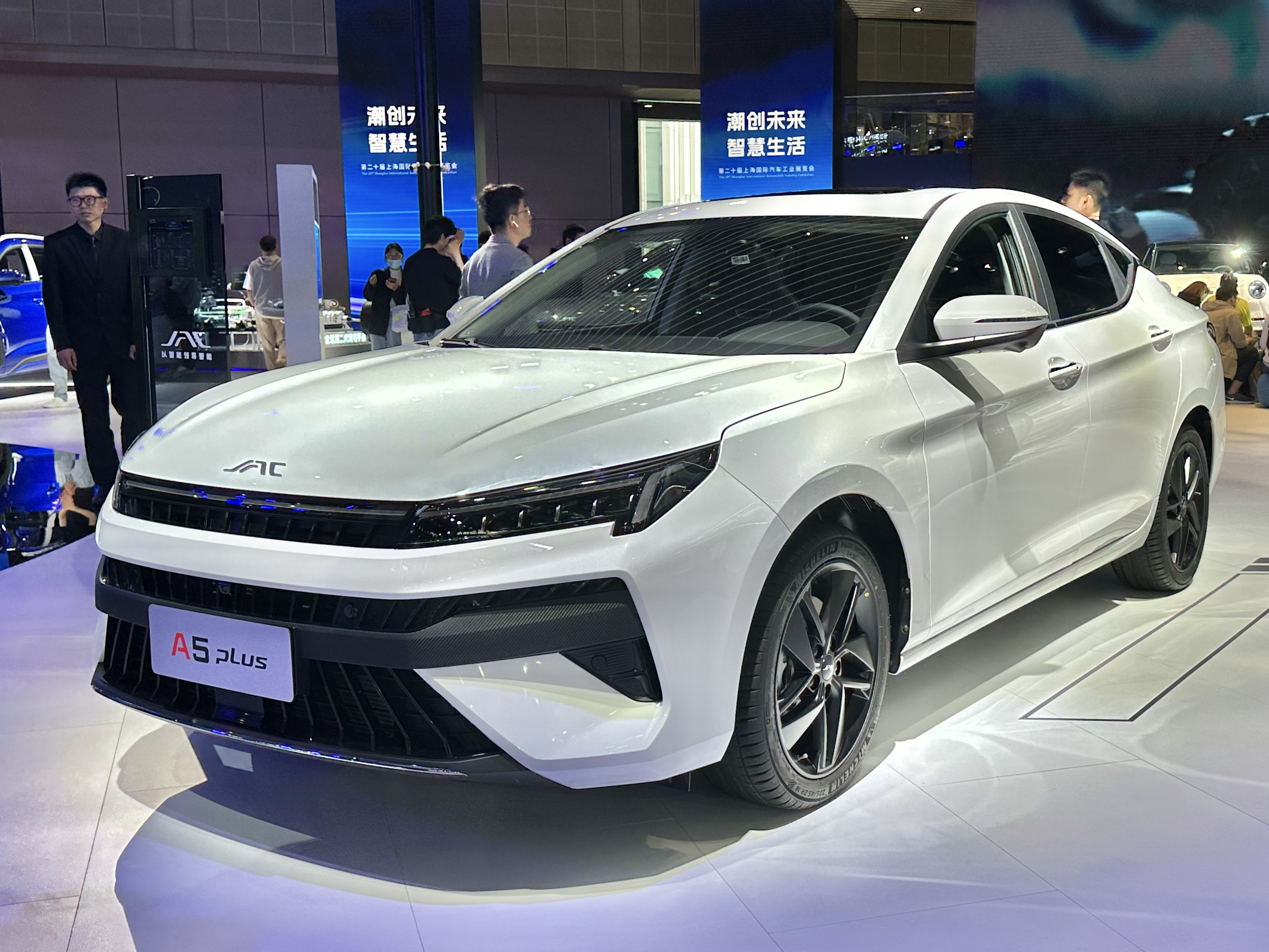
JAC A5 Plus

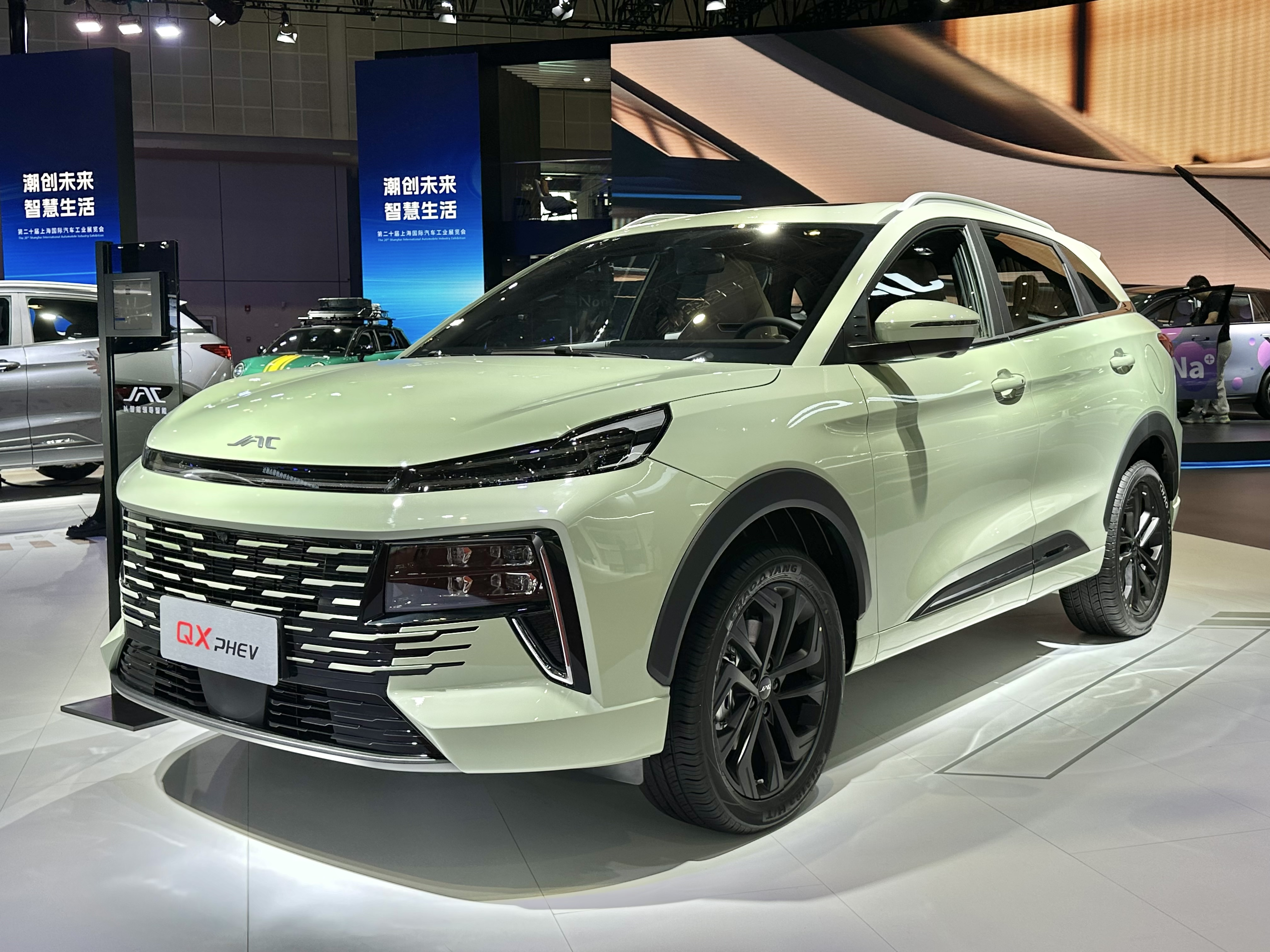
JAC QX PHEV

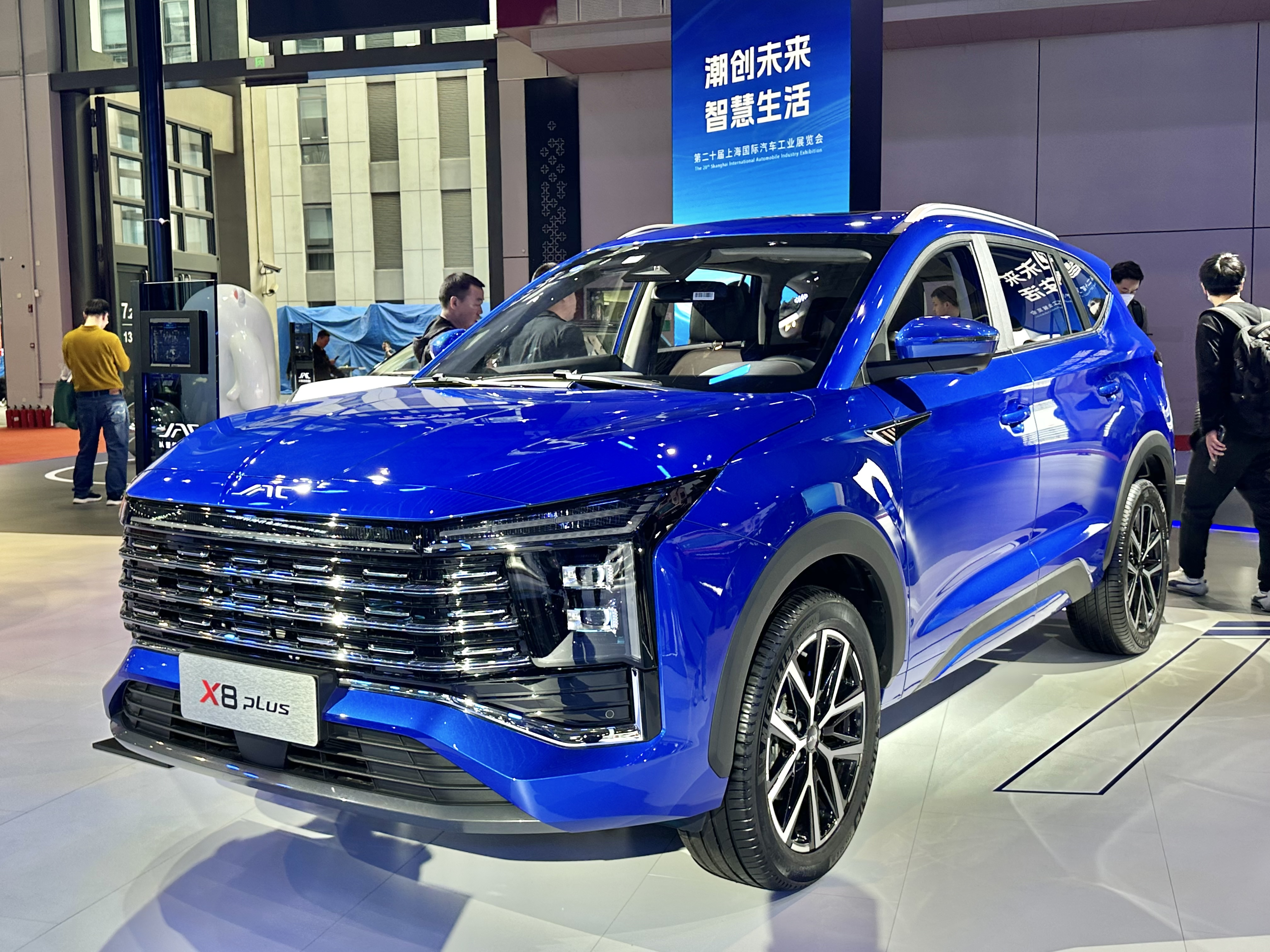
JAC X8 Plus

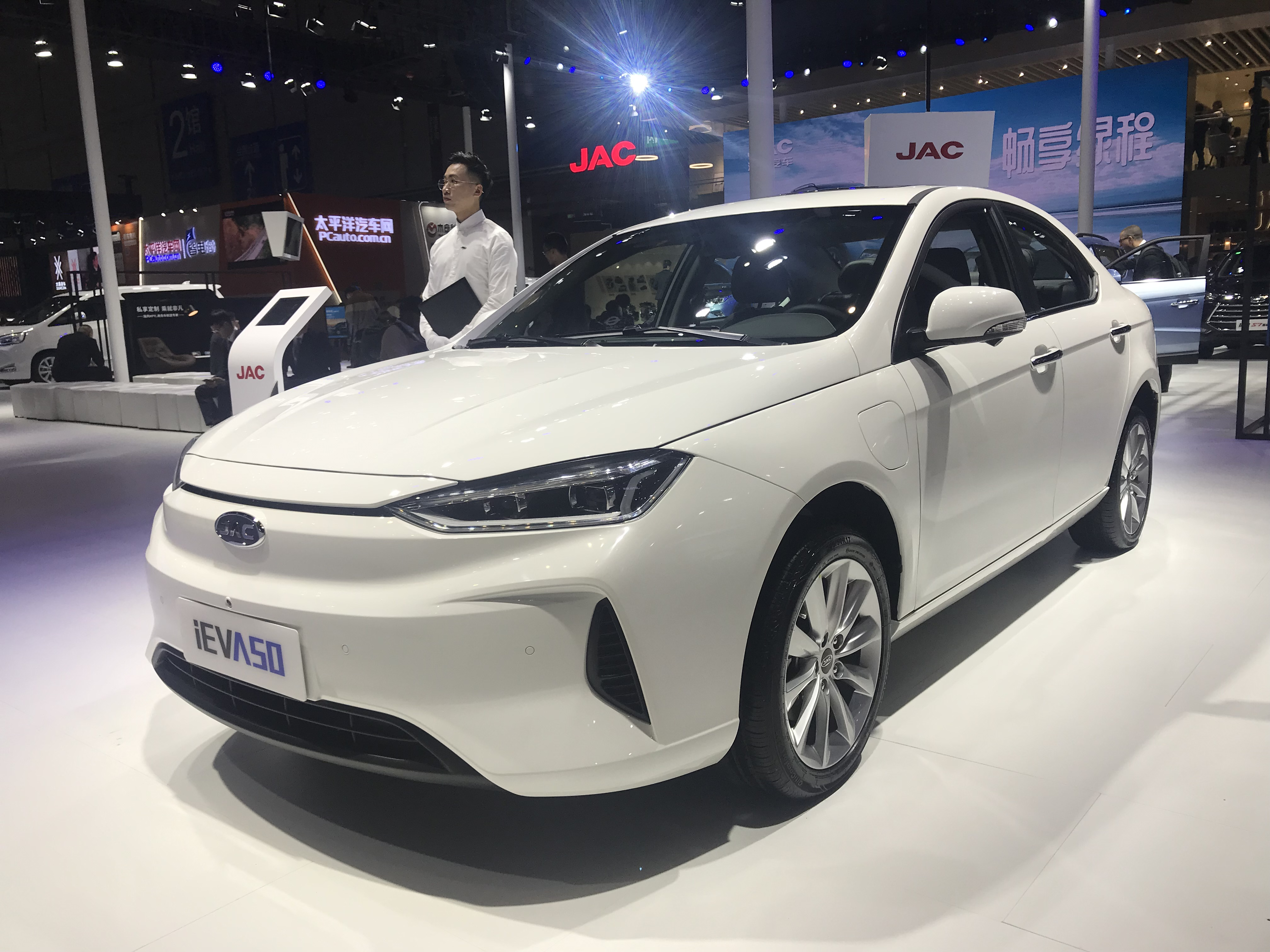
JAC iEVA50

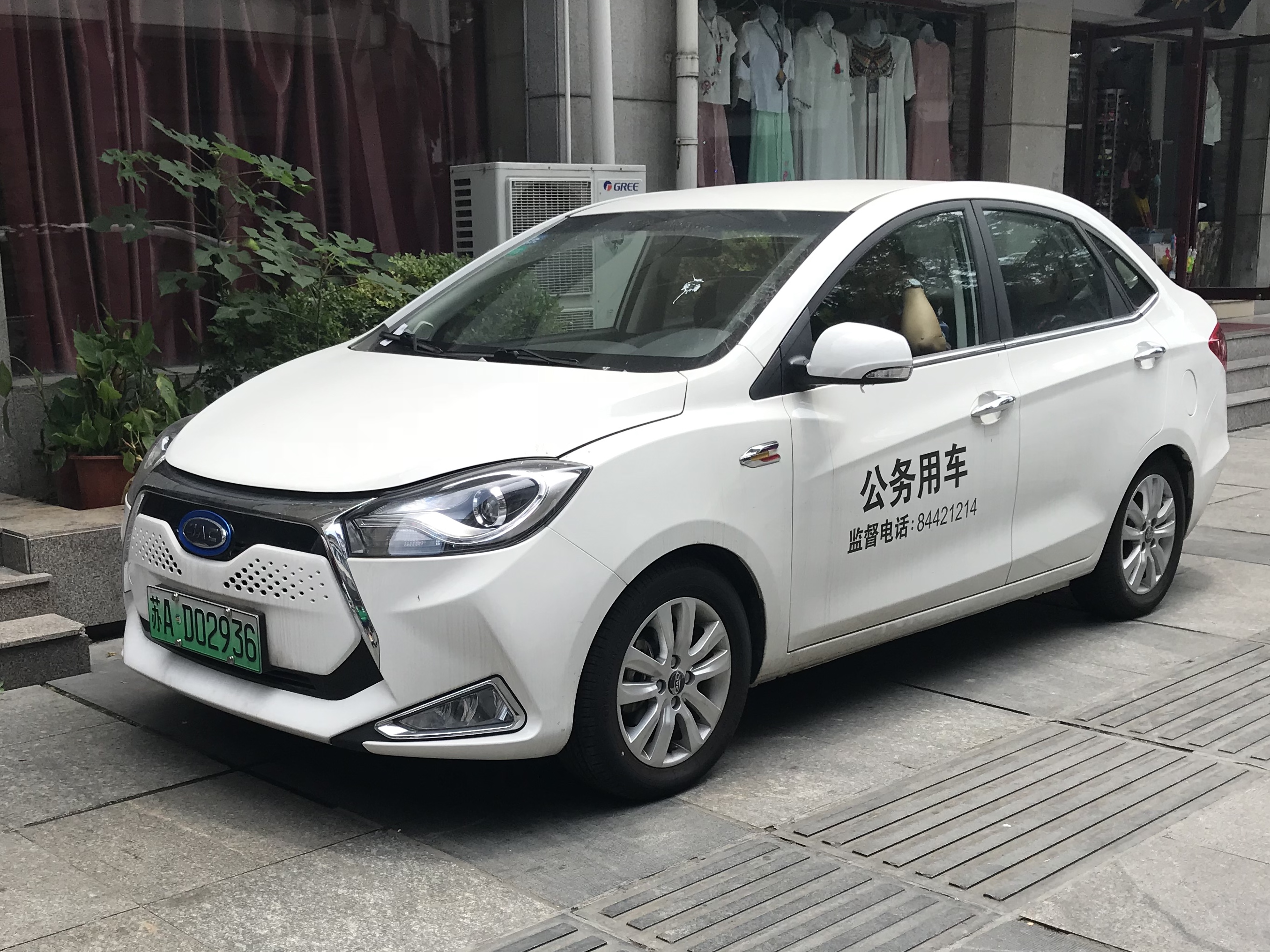
JAC iEV7

=== Sehol ===
Sehol (思皓) was established in 2018 as a joint venture between JAC and Volkswagen, originally positioned as a brand for pure electric vehicles. In 2020, the Volkswagen Group increased its stake in the joint venture, JAC Volkswagen, to 75% and officially renamed it to Volkswagen Anhui. The Sehol brand has been licensed for use by JAC, essentially making it no longer a joint venture brand. In 2023, JAC revealed that they decided to phase out the Sehol brand in the future.

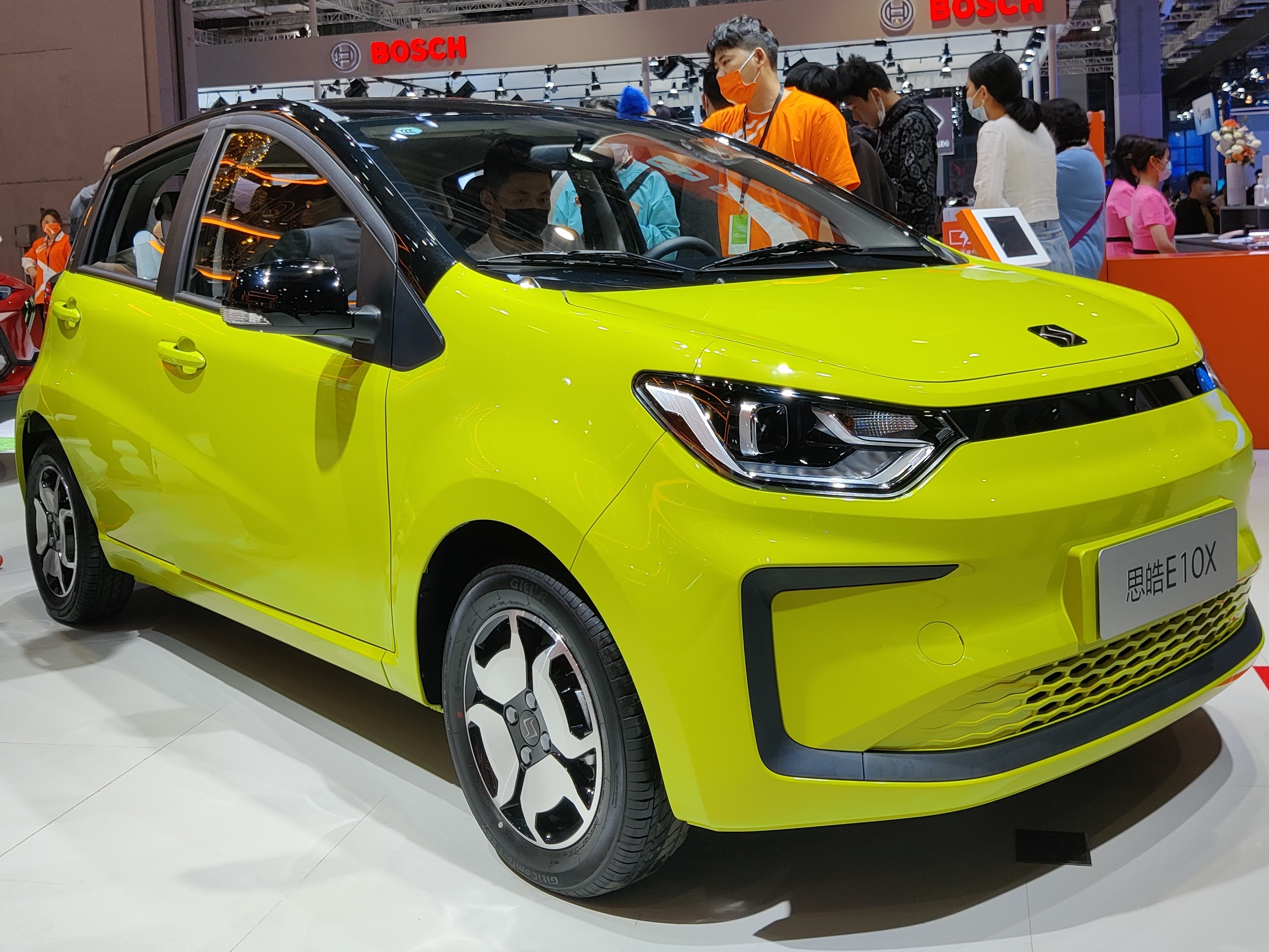
Sehol E10X

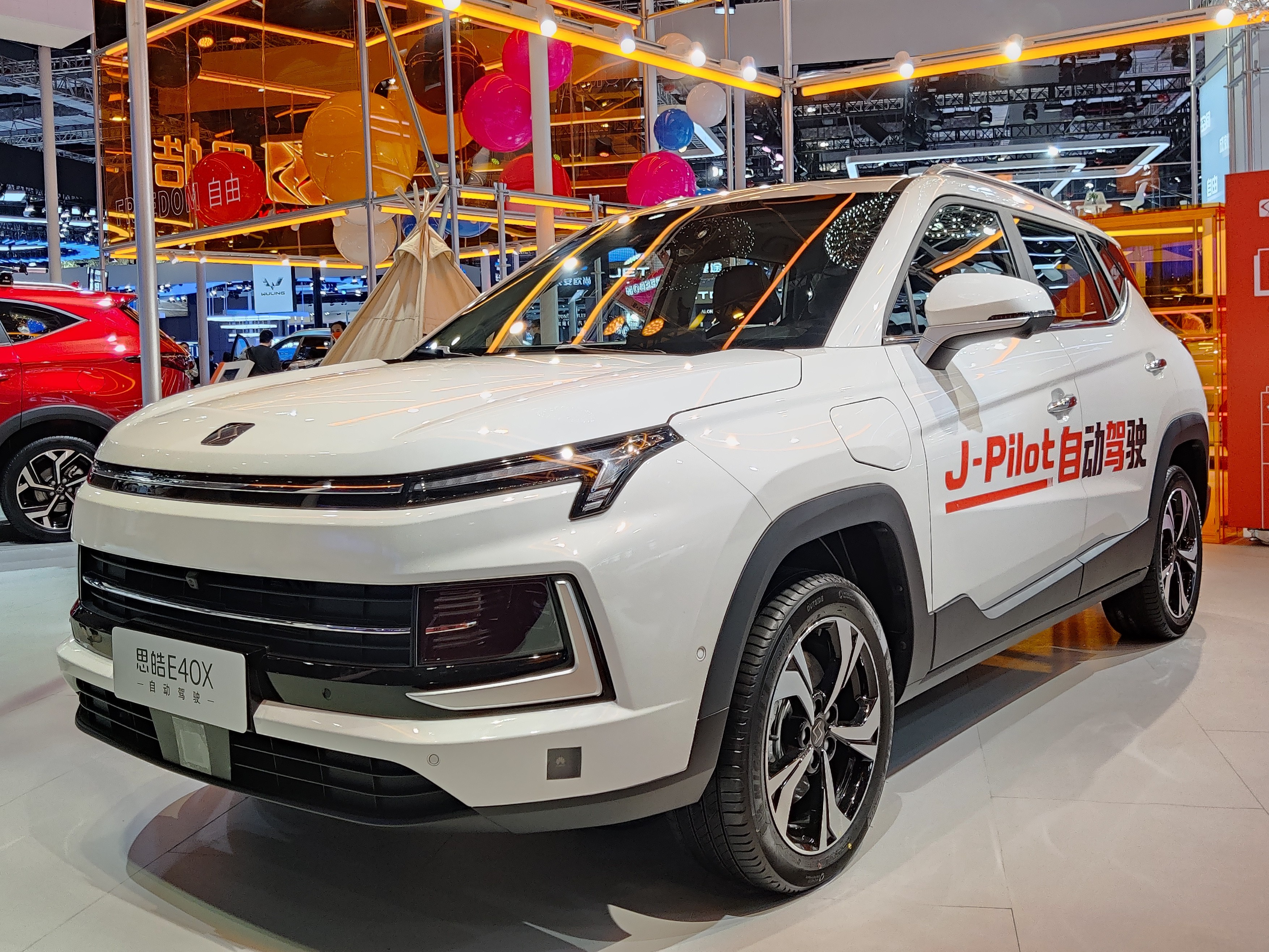
Sehol X4

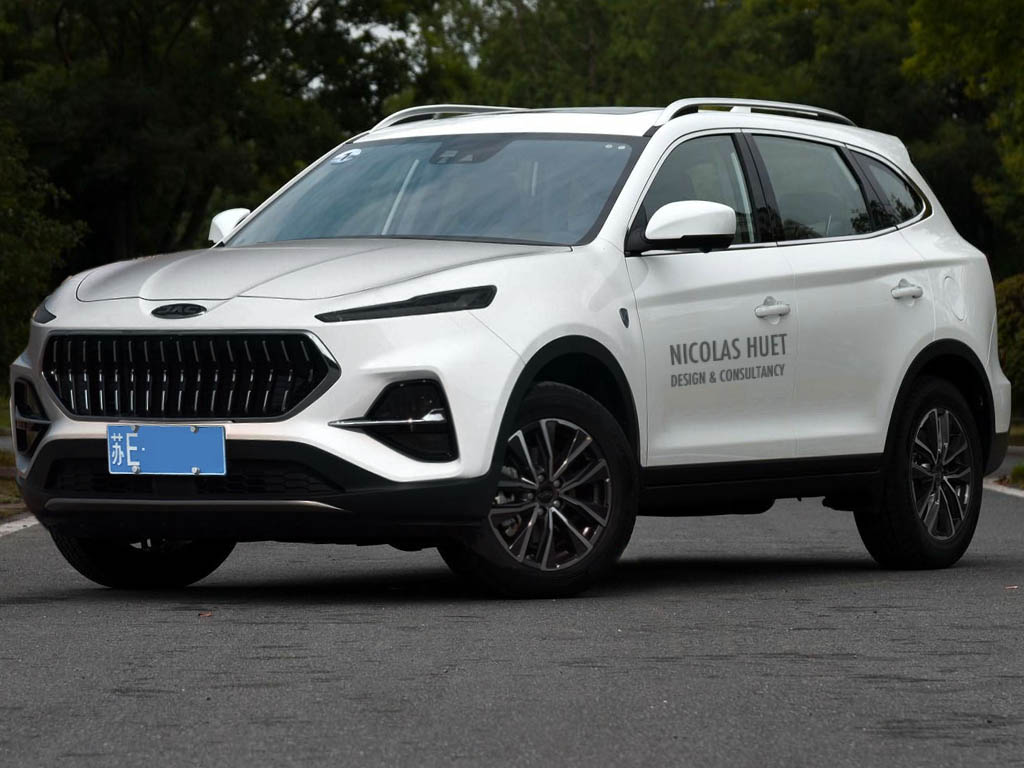
Sehol X7

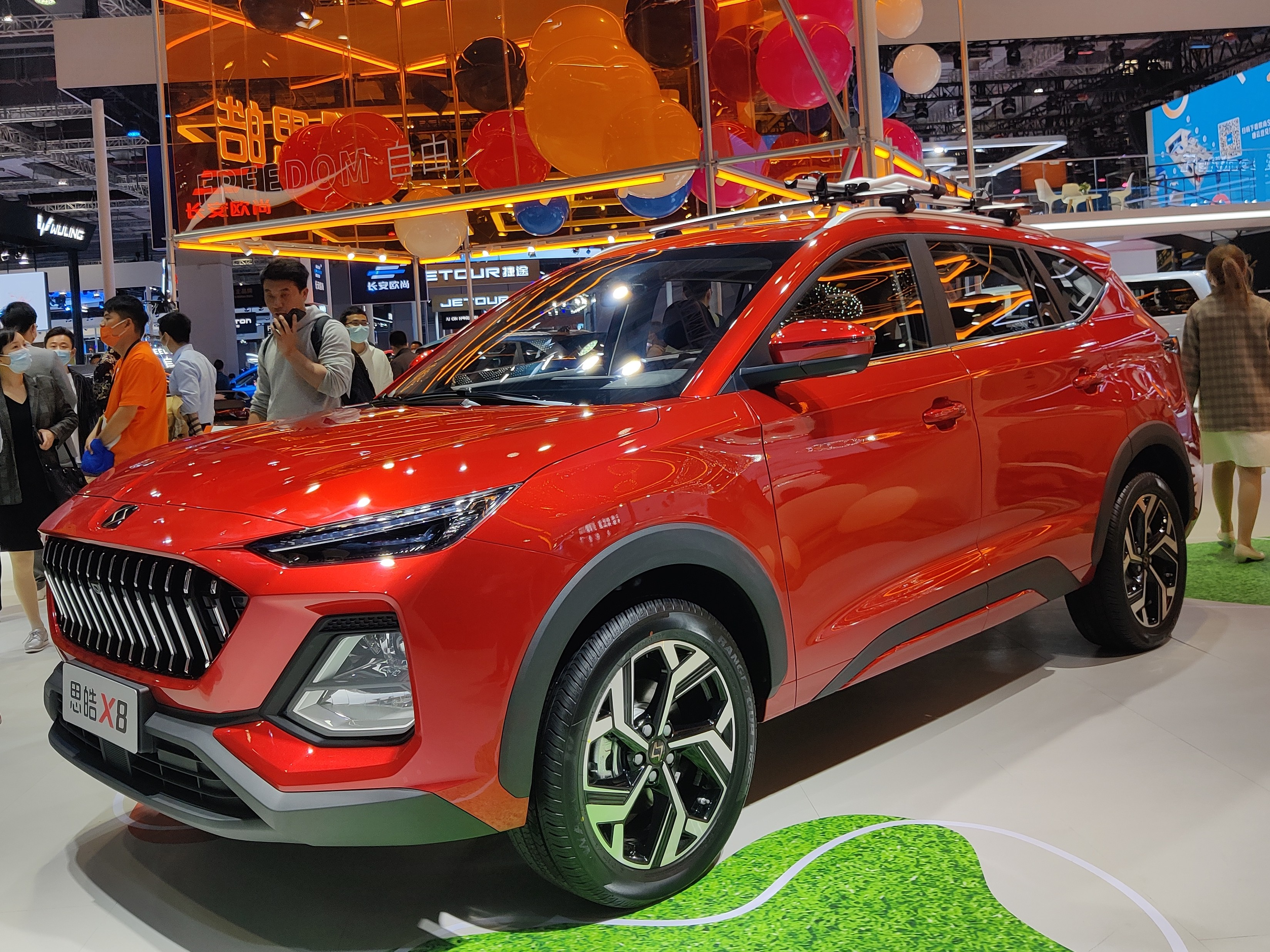
Sehol X8

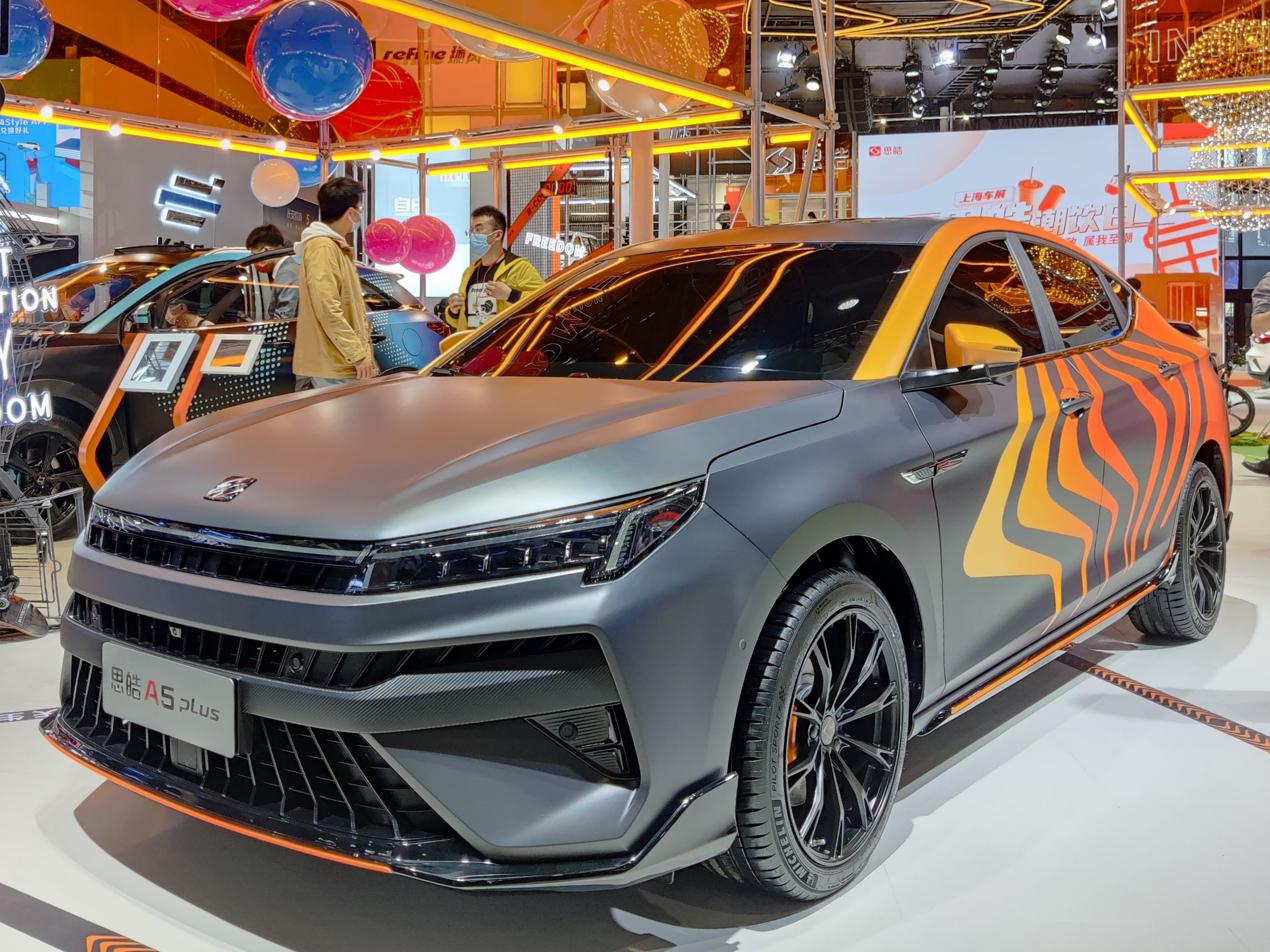
Sehol A5 Plus

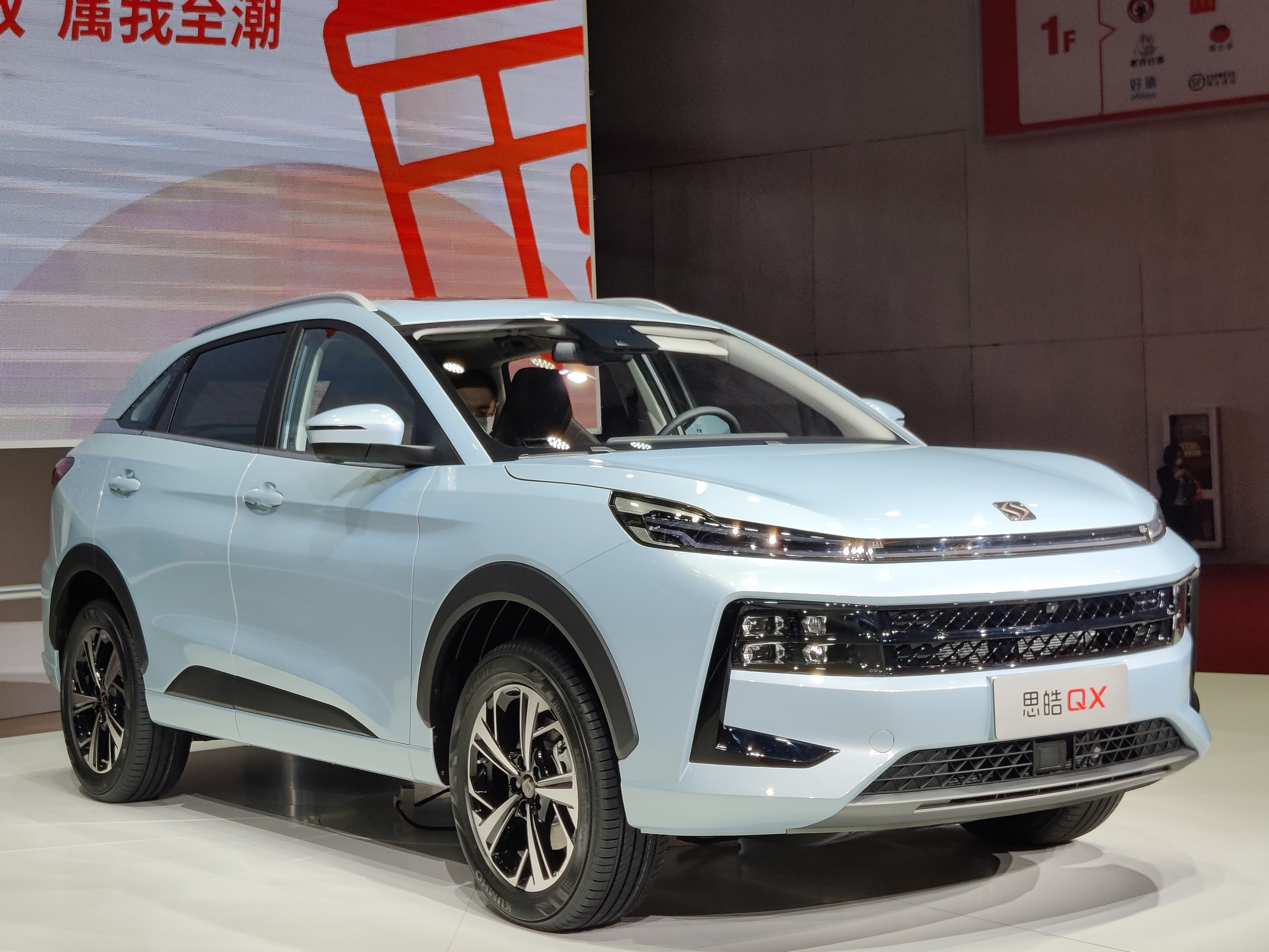
Sehol QX

=== JAC Yiwei ===
JAC Yiwei (江淮钇为) is JAC's brand for entry-level passenger EVs, launched in April 2023.

- JAC Yiwei 3 (2023–present), subcompact hatchback
- JAC Yiwei Hua Xian Zi (2024–present), city car, rebadged Sehol E10X
- JAC Yiwei Aipao (2024–present), compact sedan, BEV variant of JAC A5 Plus.
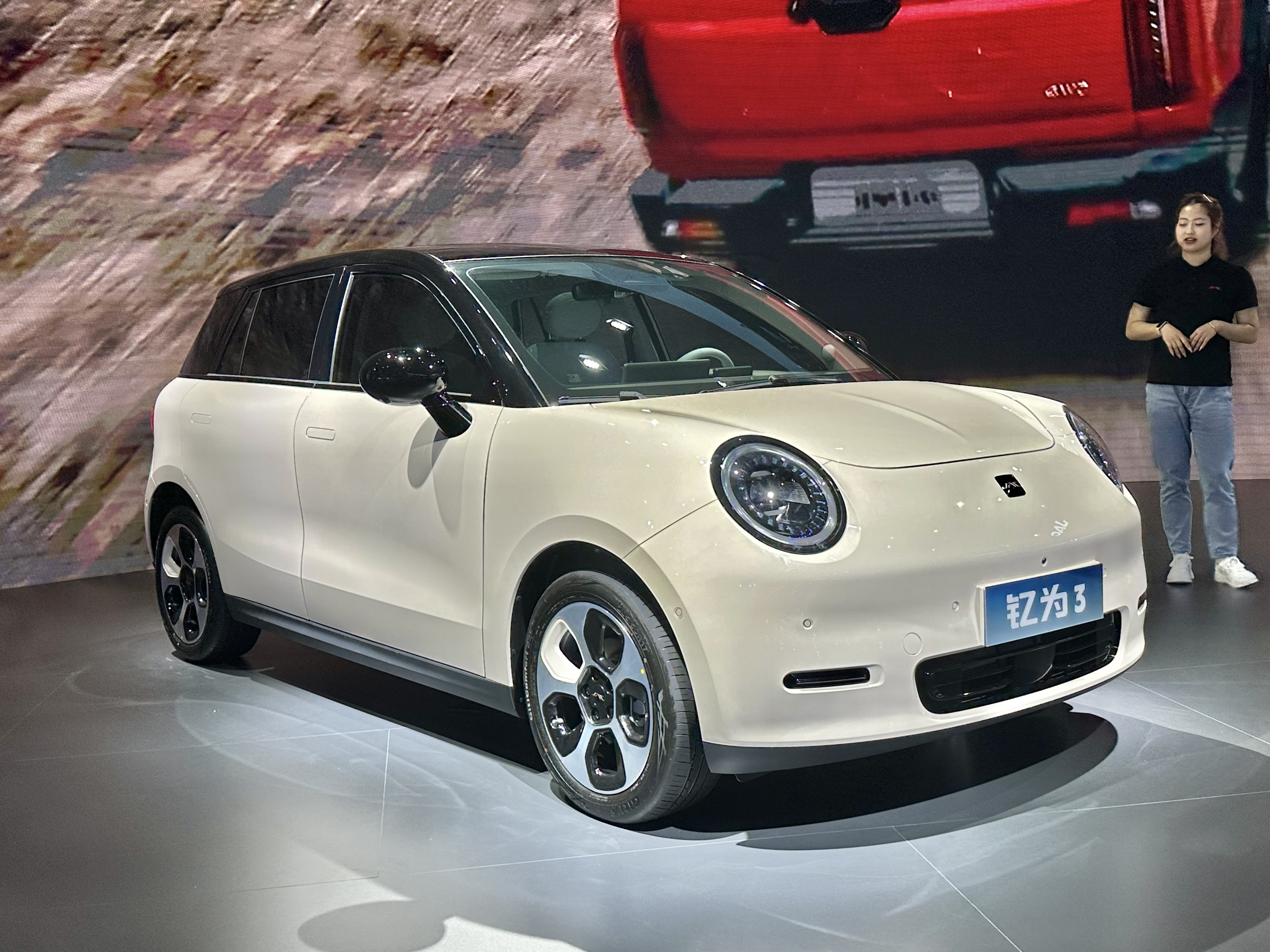
JAC Yiwei 3

=== JAC Refine ===
JAC Refine (江淮瑞风) was a brand of JAC for commercial MPV/Van. In 2020, JAC Refine was lifted as an independent brand from the MPV product line of JAC.

- JAC Refine M3 (2015–present), compact minivan
  - JAC Refine E3, EV variant of Refine M3
- JAC Refine M4 (2016–present), mid-size minivan
- JAC Refine RF8 (2024–present), full-size minivan
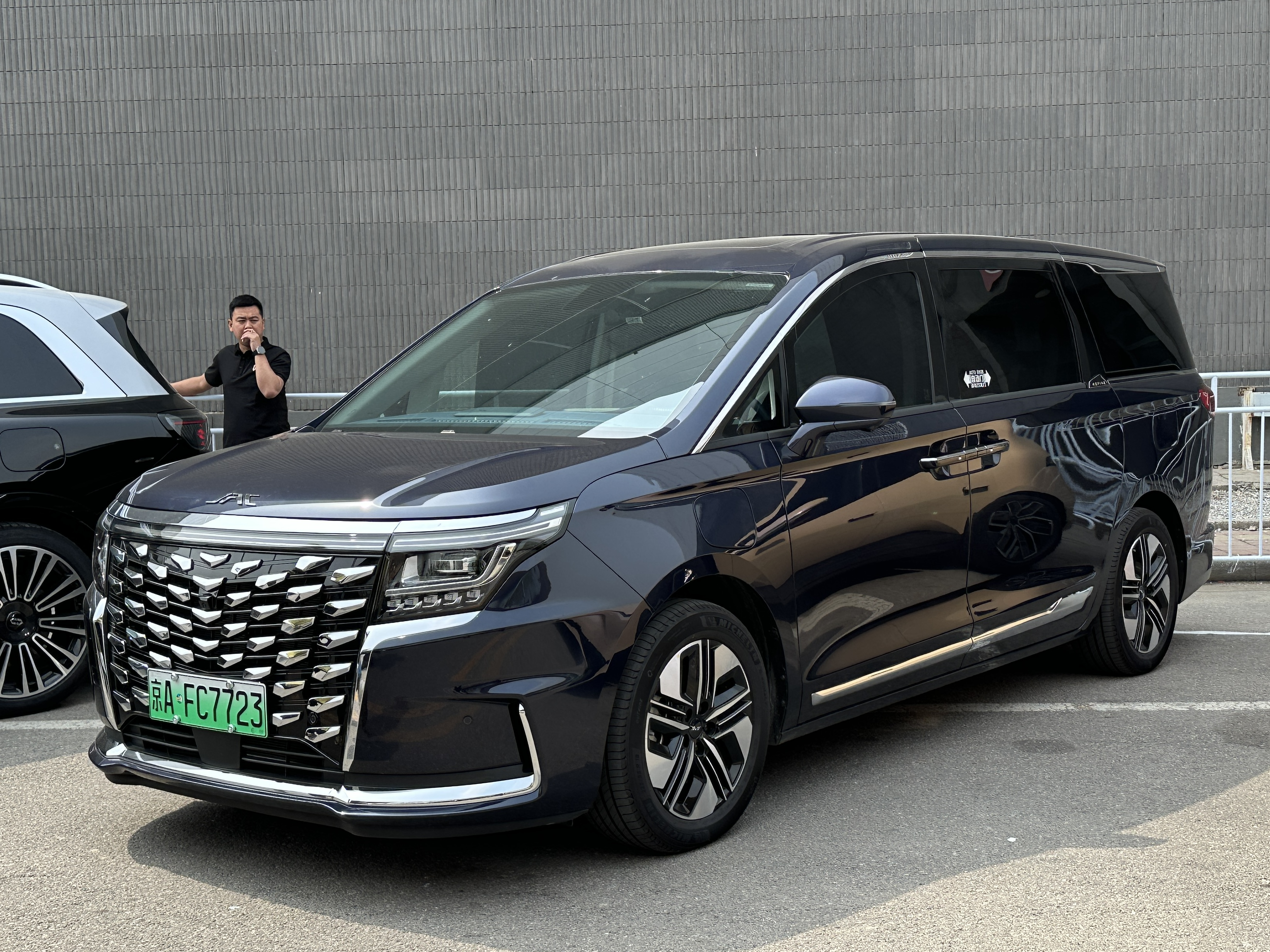
JAC Refine RF8

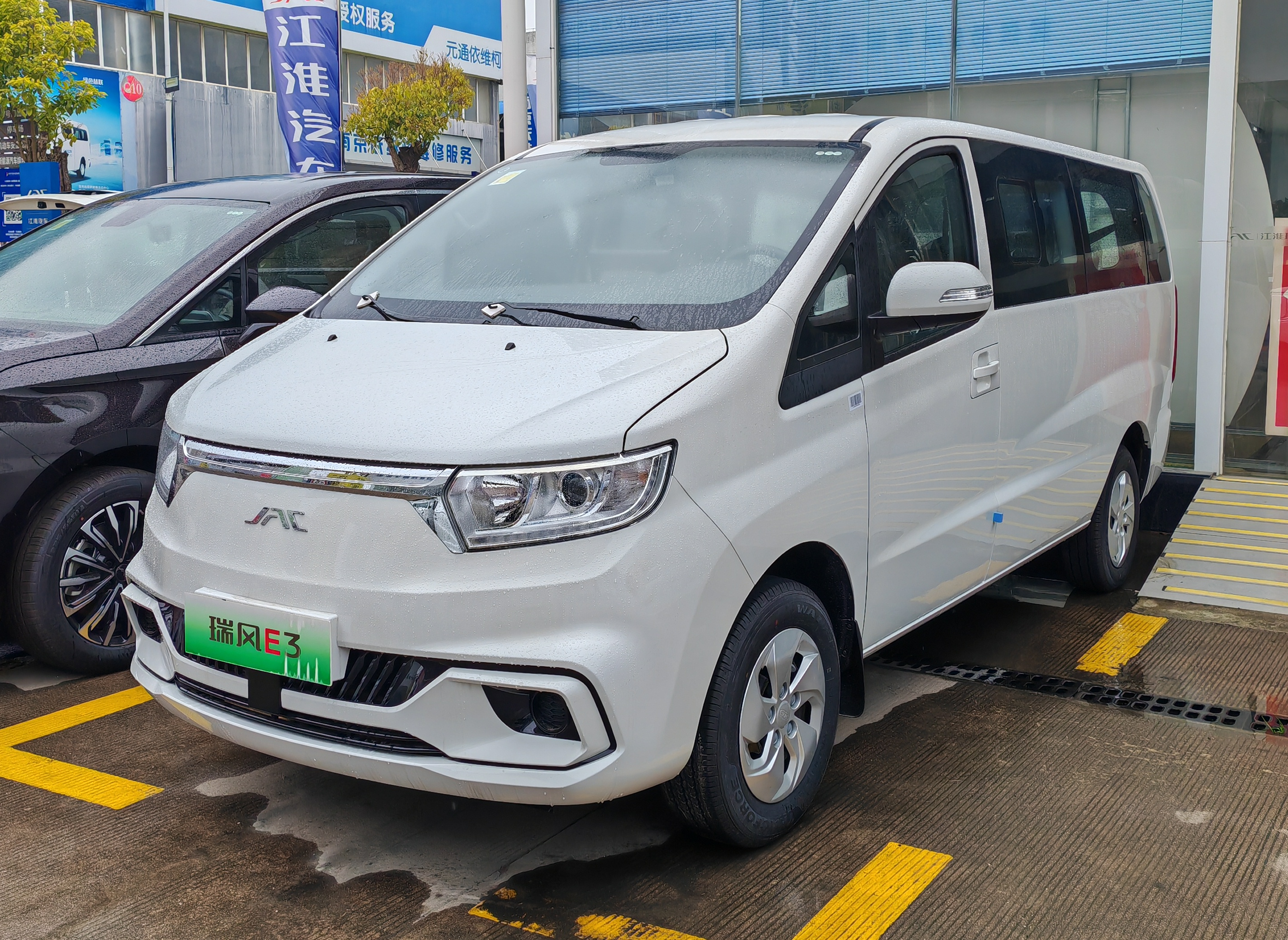
JAC Refine E3

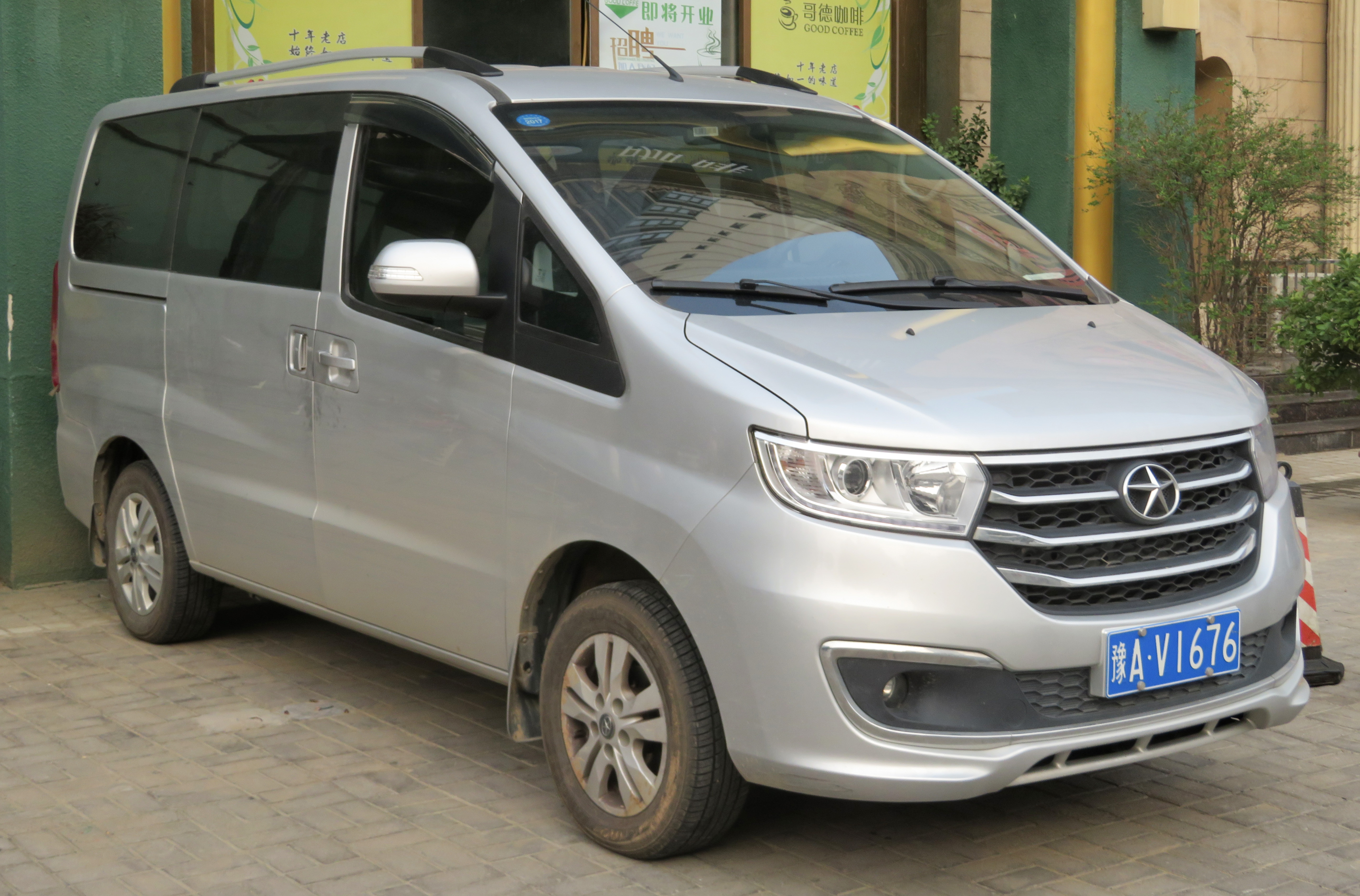
JAC Refine M3

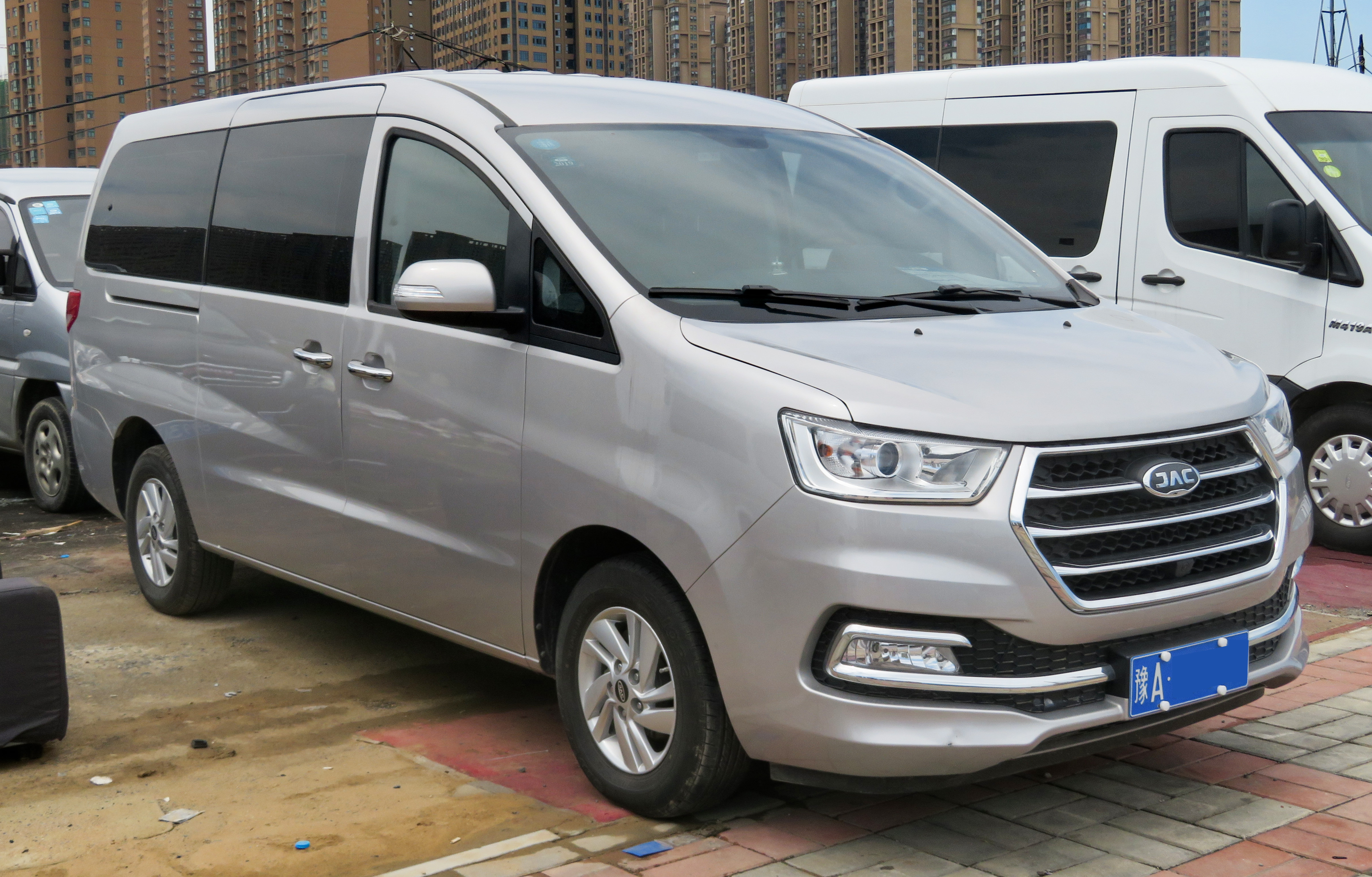
JAC Refine M4

== Discontinued models ==
=== JAC ===
==== Sedan ====
- JAC Refine A60 (2015–2020), mid-size sedan
  - JAC iEVA60 (2019–2021), variant of Refine A60
- JAC Binyue (2008–2012), mid-size sedan
- JAC Jiayue A5 (2019–2021), compact sedan, rebadged to Sehol A5
- JAC Heyue (2011–2017), compact sedan and hatchback
- JAC Heyue A30 (2012–2019), subcompact sedan
- JAC Heyue A20 (2013–2014), subcompact sedan
- JAC Heyue Tongyue (2008–2017), subcompact sedan and hatchback
  - JAC Tongyue Cross (2009–2014), SUV variant of Tongyue
  - JAC iEV4 (2011–2018), EV variant of Tongyue
- JAC Yueyue (2010–2019), city car
  - JAC Yueyue Cross (2012–2019), SUV variant of Yueyue

==== SUV ====
- JAC Jiayue X7 (2020–2021), mid-size SUV, rebadged to Sehol X7
- JAC Jiayue X4 (2020–2021), compact SUV, rebadged to Sehol X4
- JAC Refine S7 (2017–2020), mid-size SUV
- JAC Refine S5 (2013–2019), compact SUV
- JAC Refine S4 (2018–2020), compact SUV
  - JAC iEVS4 (2019–2022), EV variant of Refine S4
- JAC Refine S3 (2013–present), subcompact SUV
- JAC Refine S2 (2015–present), subcompact SUV
  - JAC iEV7S (2016–2023), EV variant of Refine S2
- JAC Refine S2 Mini (2017–2020), mini SUV
  - JAC iEV6E (2016–2021), based on the Refine S2 Mini
- JAC Rein (2007–2013), compact SUV

==== Van/MPV ====
- JAC Refine R3 (2017–2025), compact MPV
- JAC Refine M2 (2010–2016), compact MPV
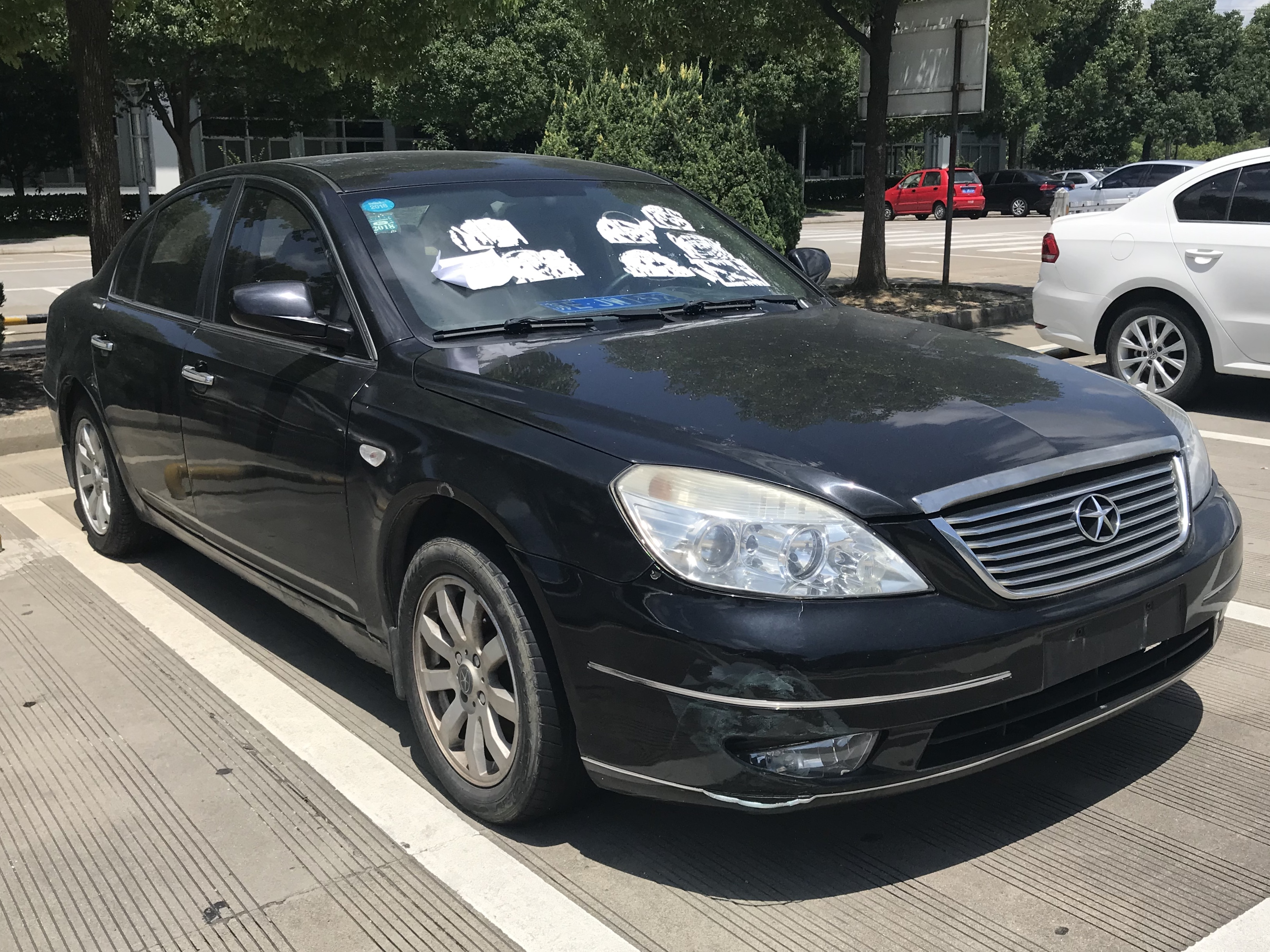
JAC Binyue

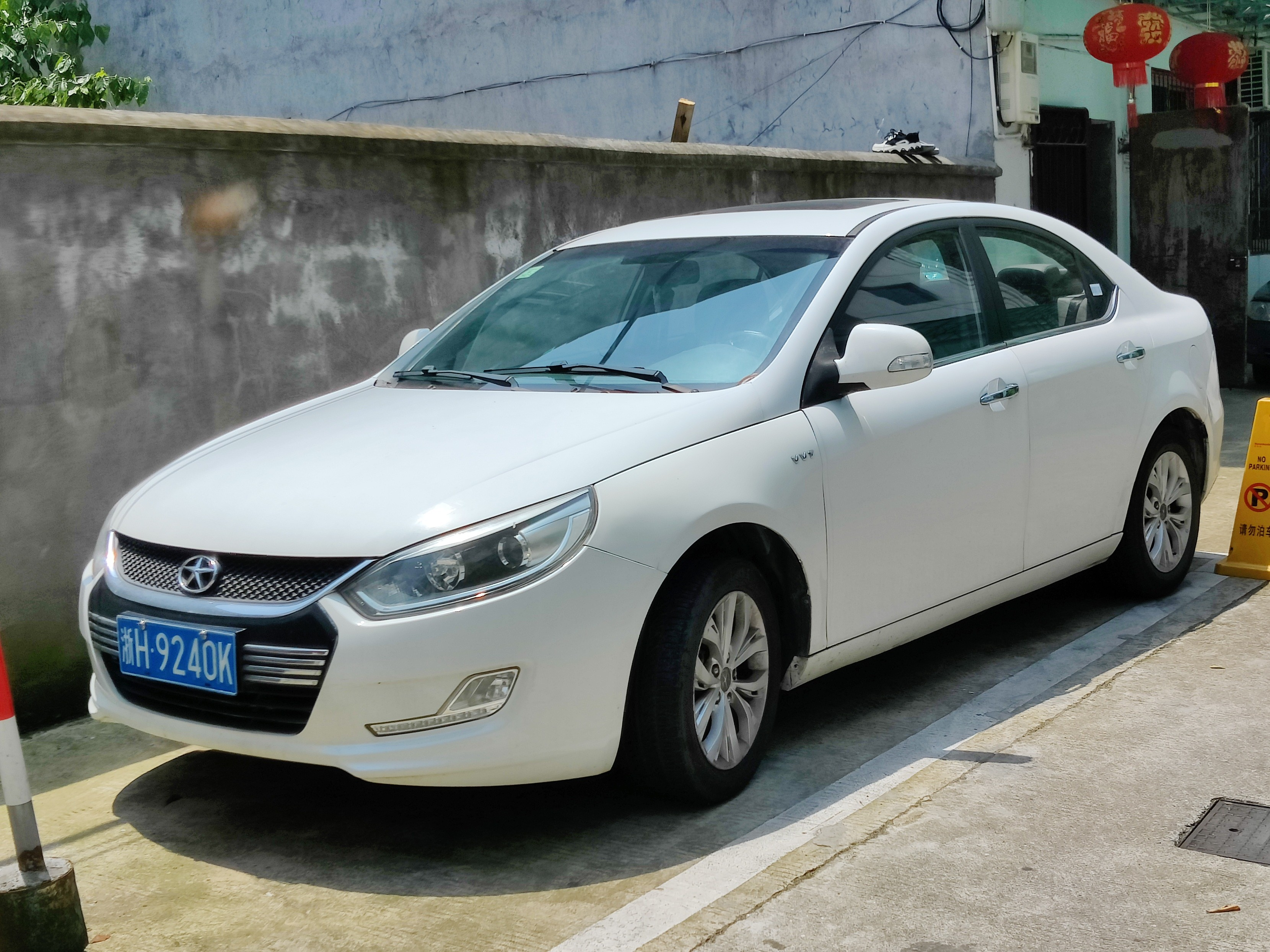
JAC Heyue

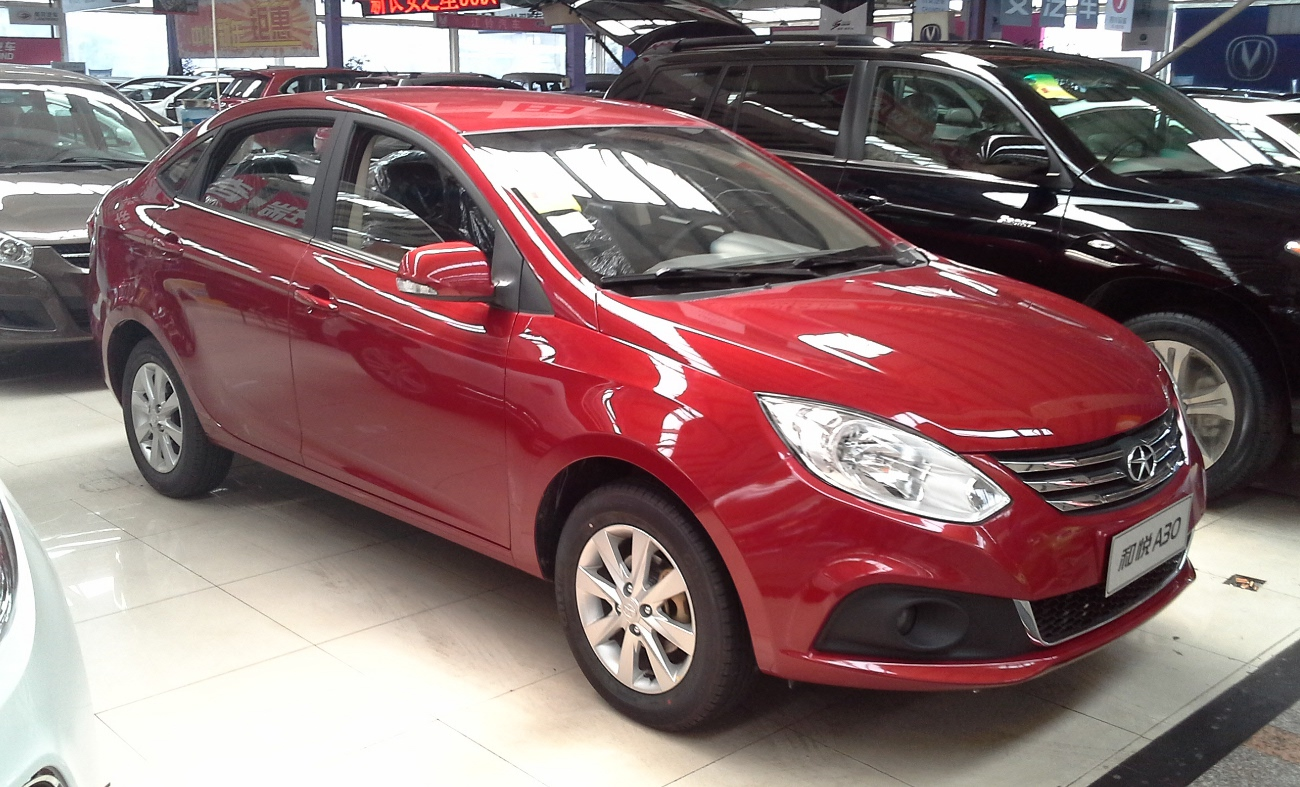
JAC Heyue A30

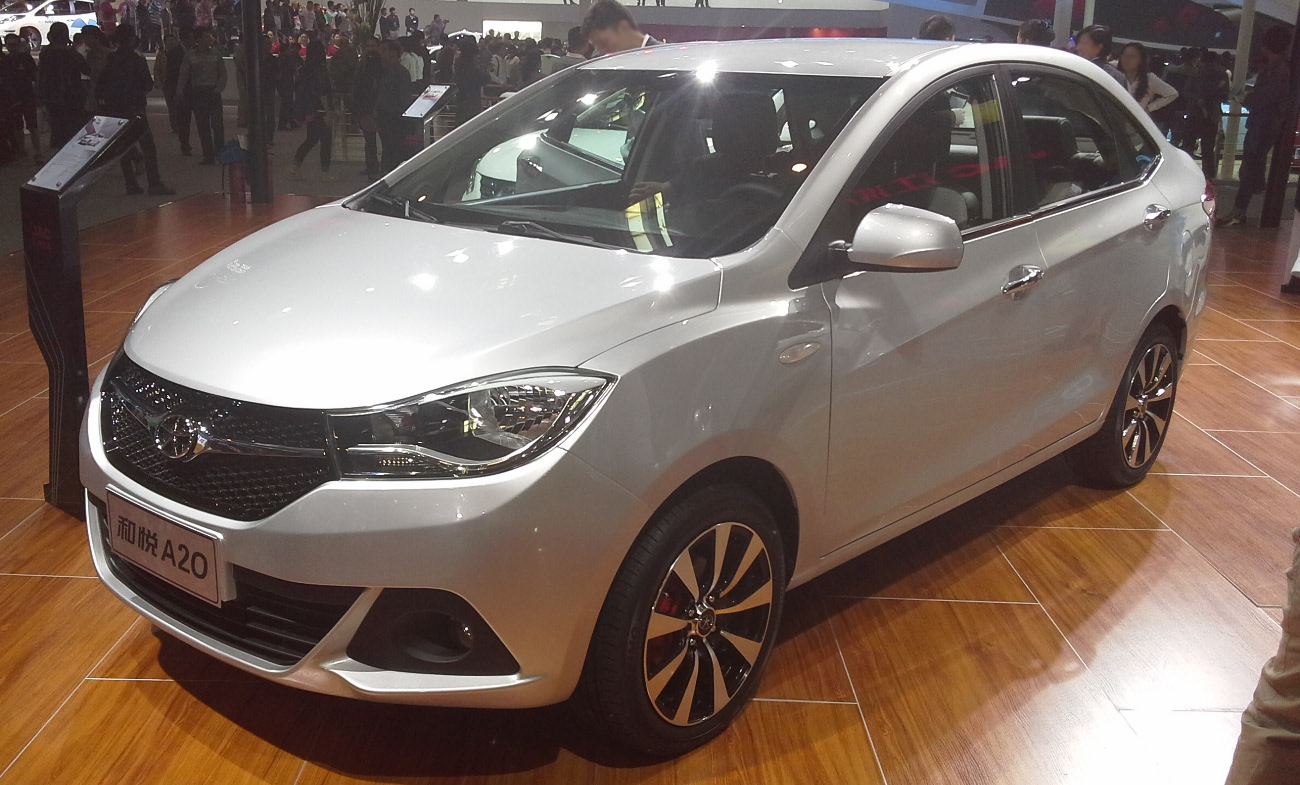
JAC Heyue A20

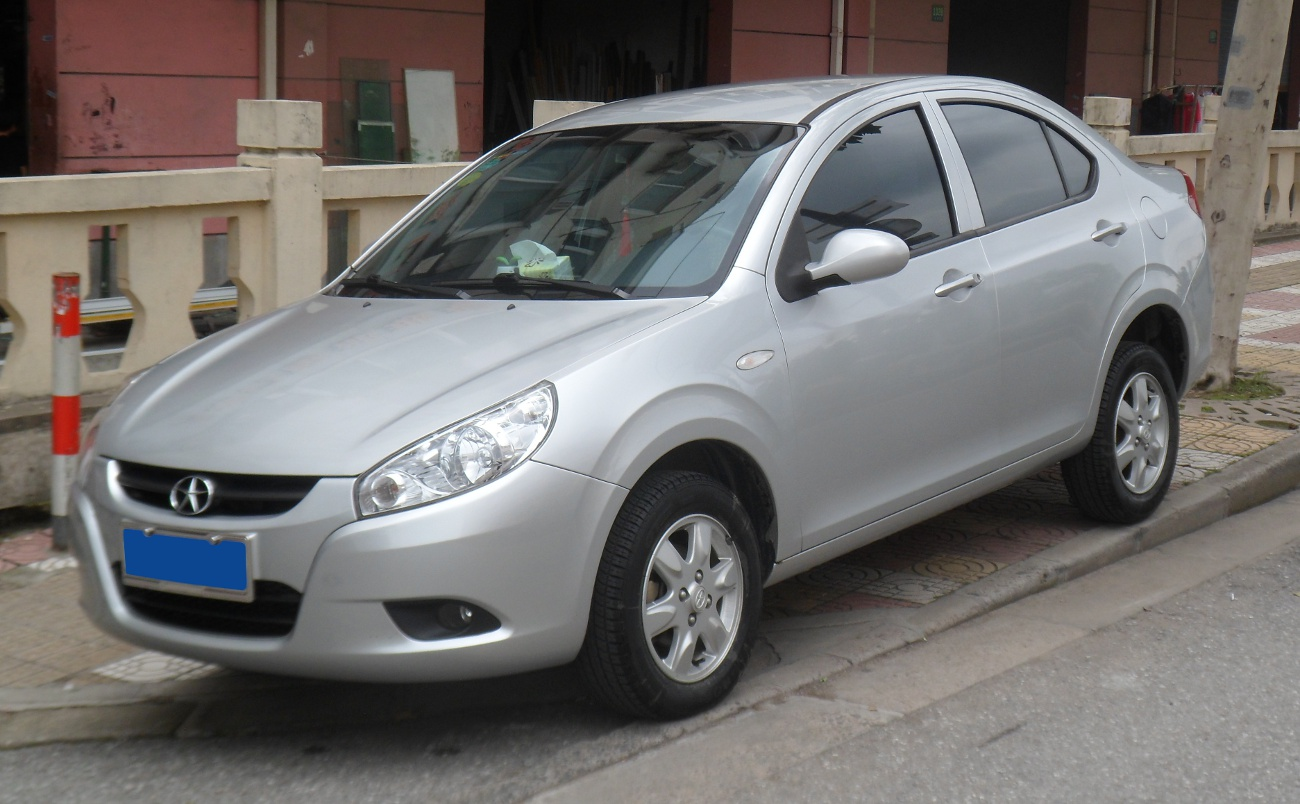
JAC Heyue Tongyue

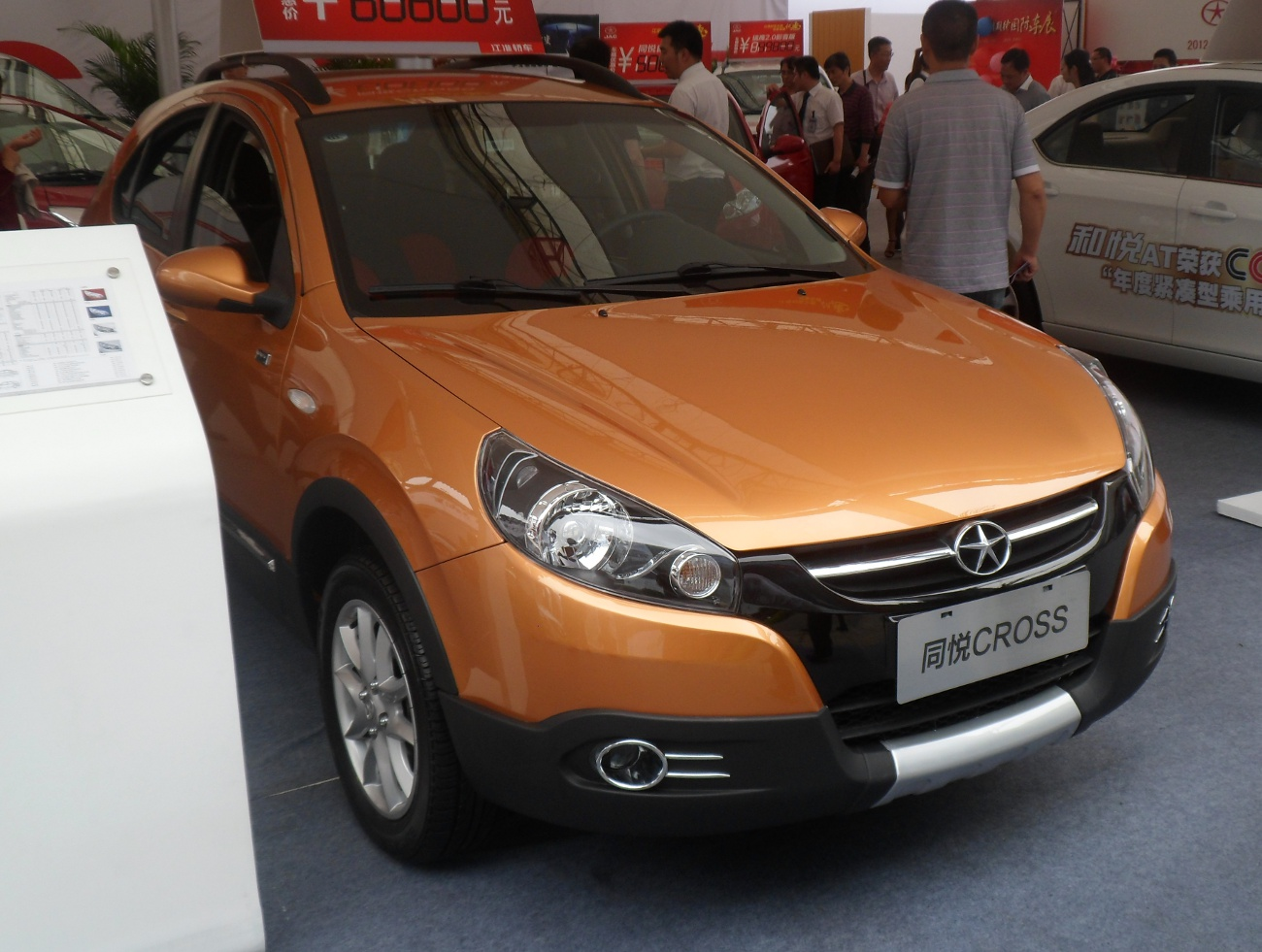
JAC Tongyue Cross

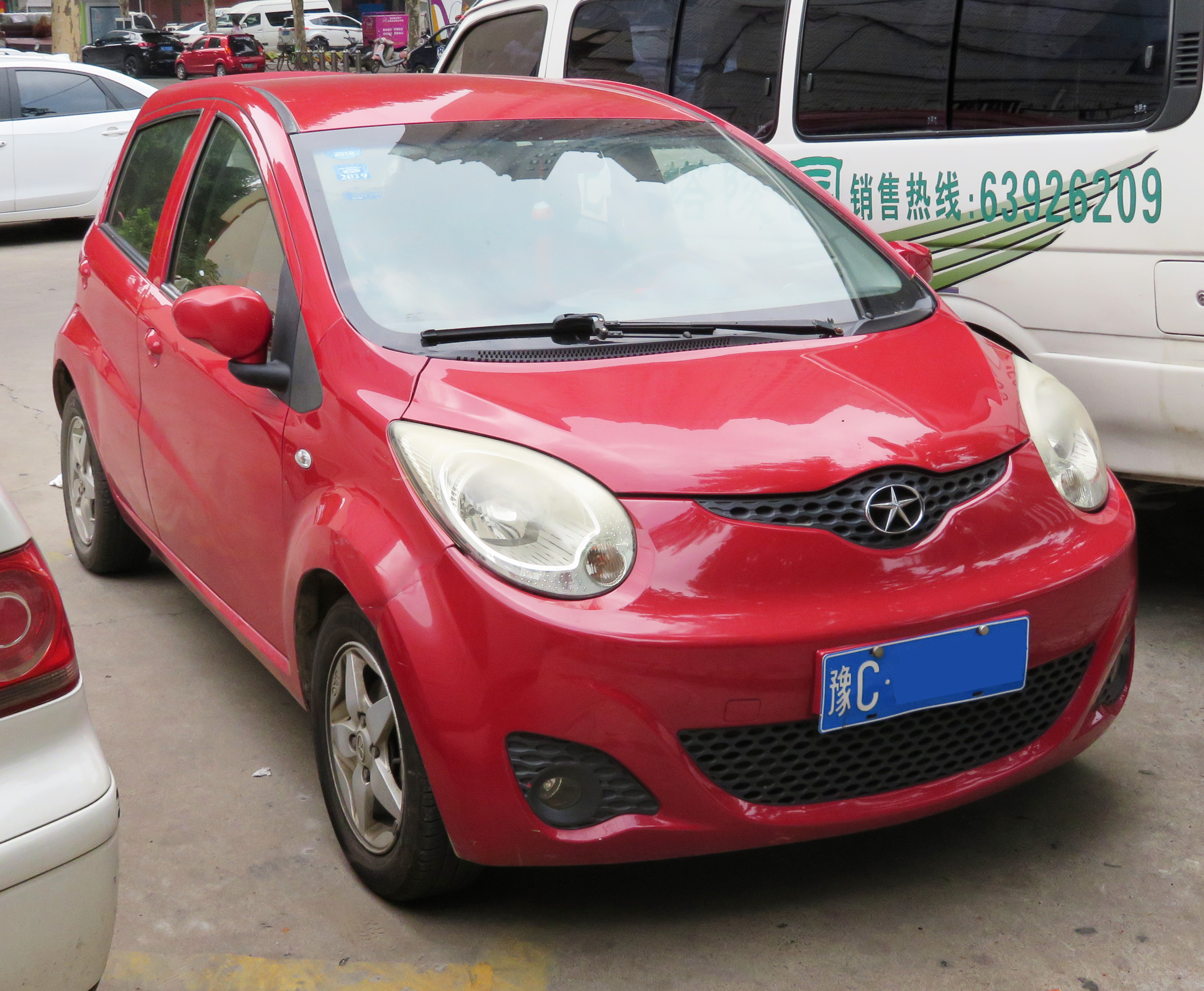
JAC Yueyue

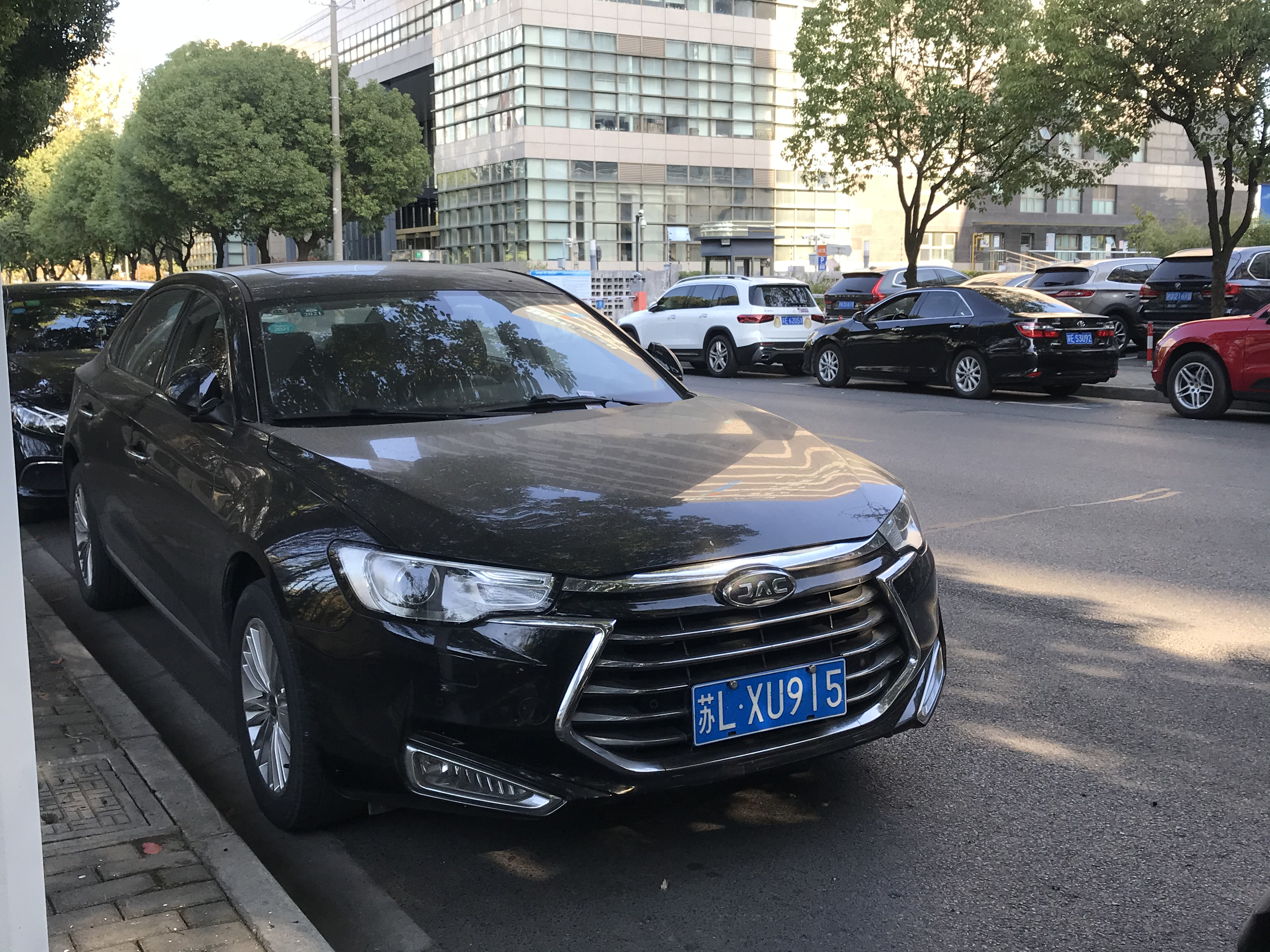
Refine A60

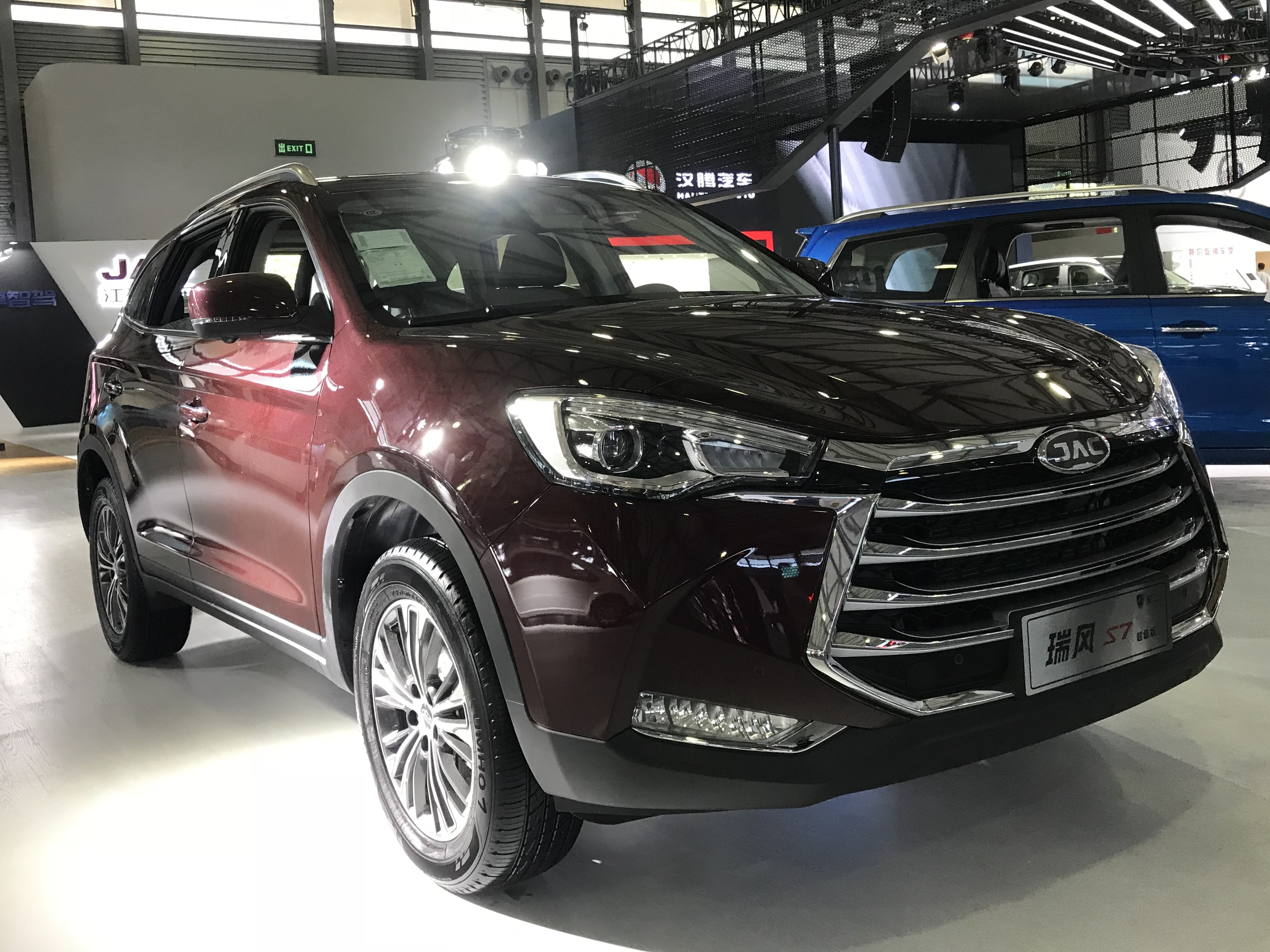
Refine S7

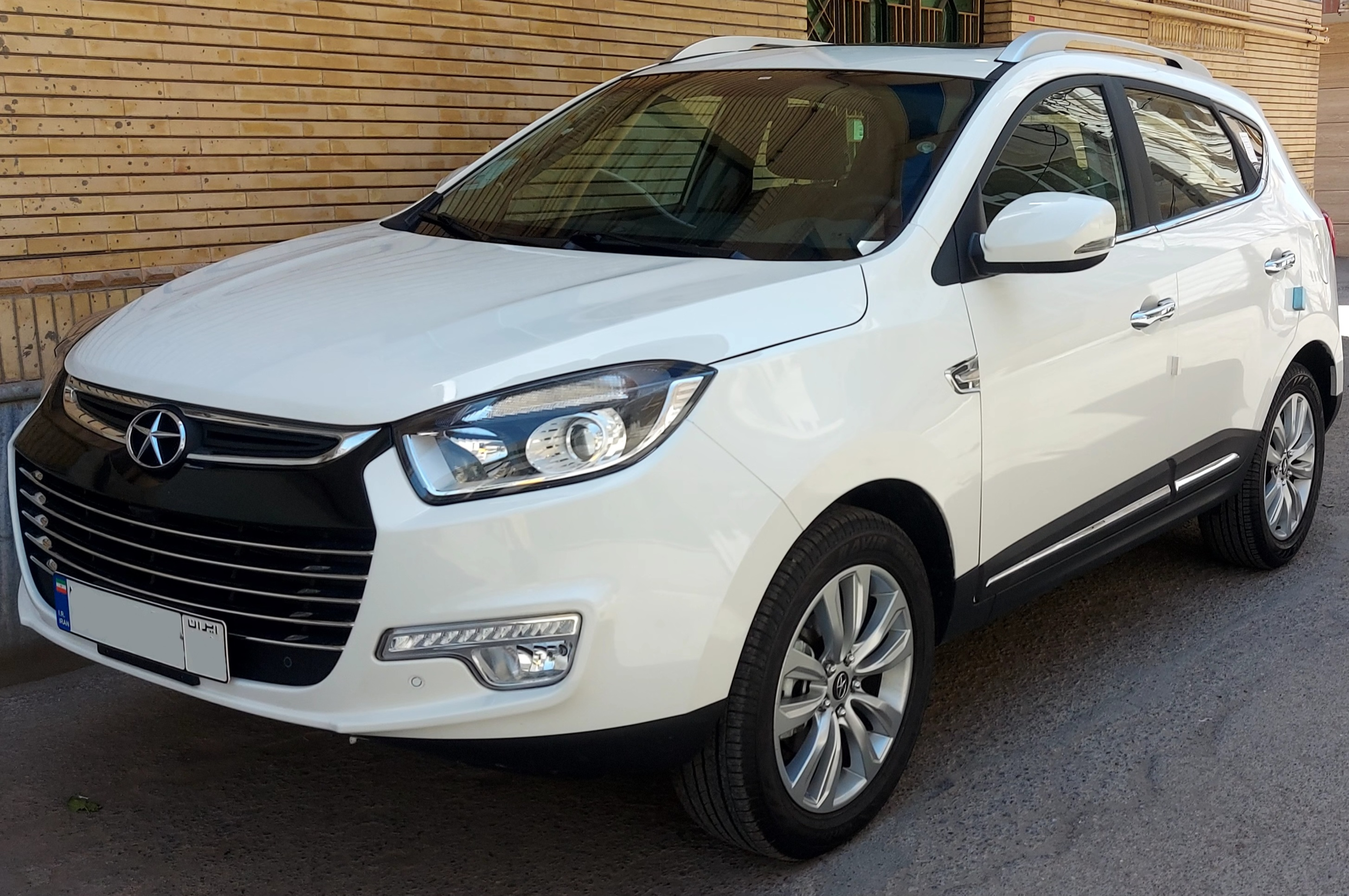
Refine S5

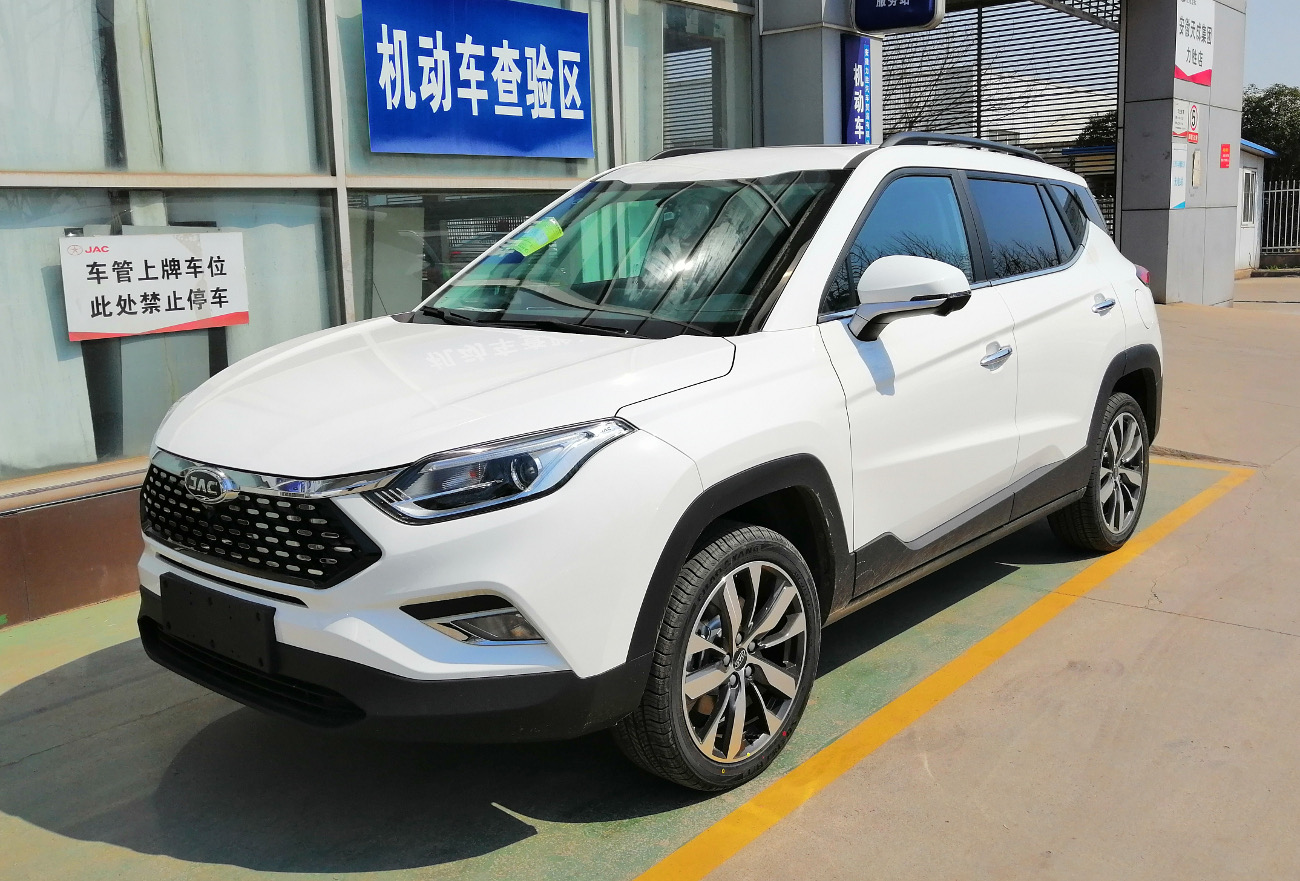
Refine S4

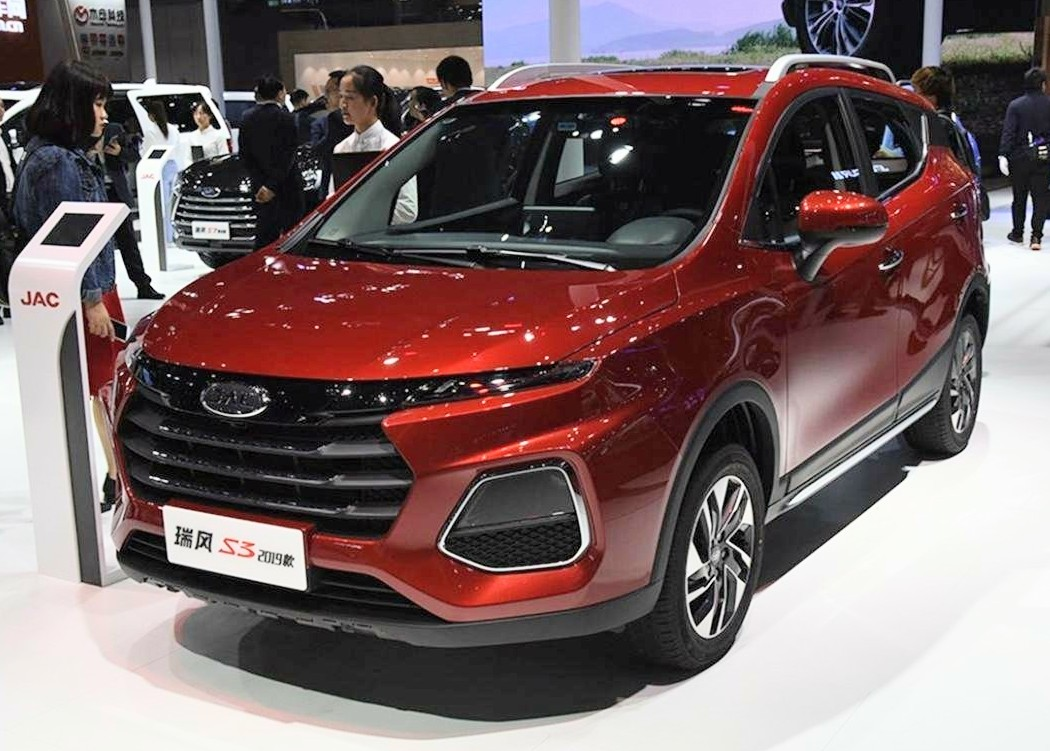
Refine S3

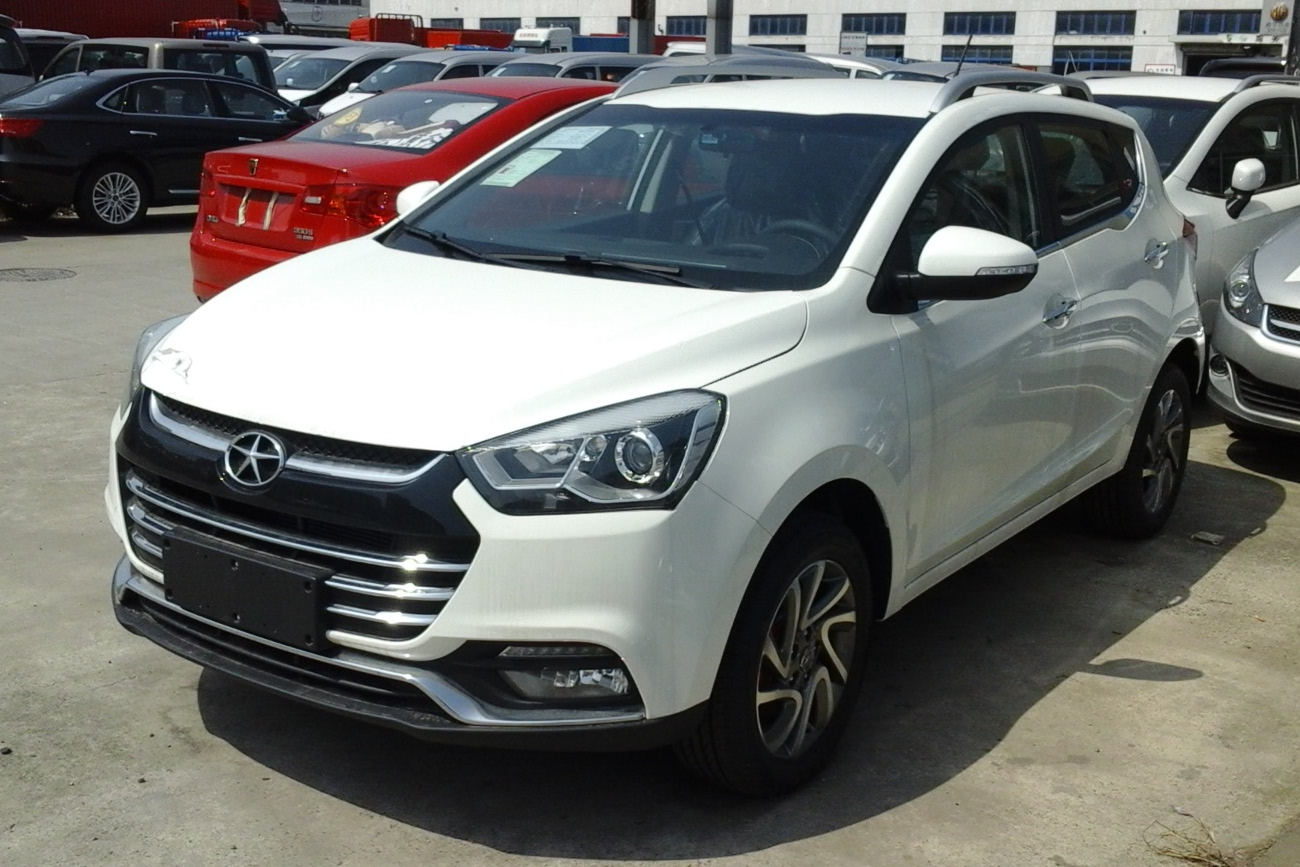
Refine S2

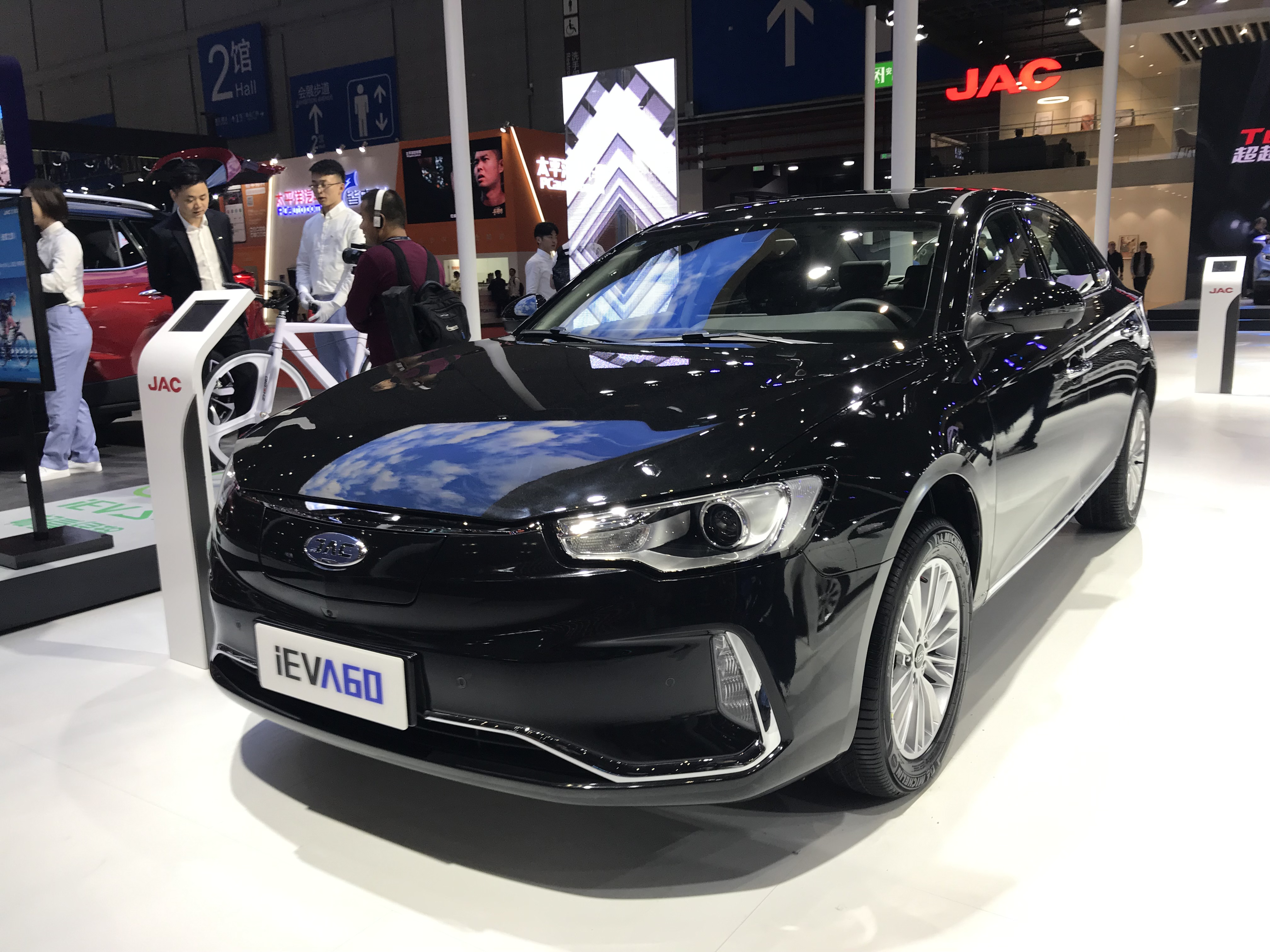
JAC iEVA60

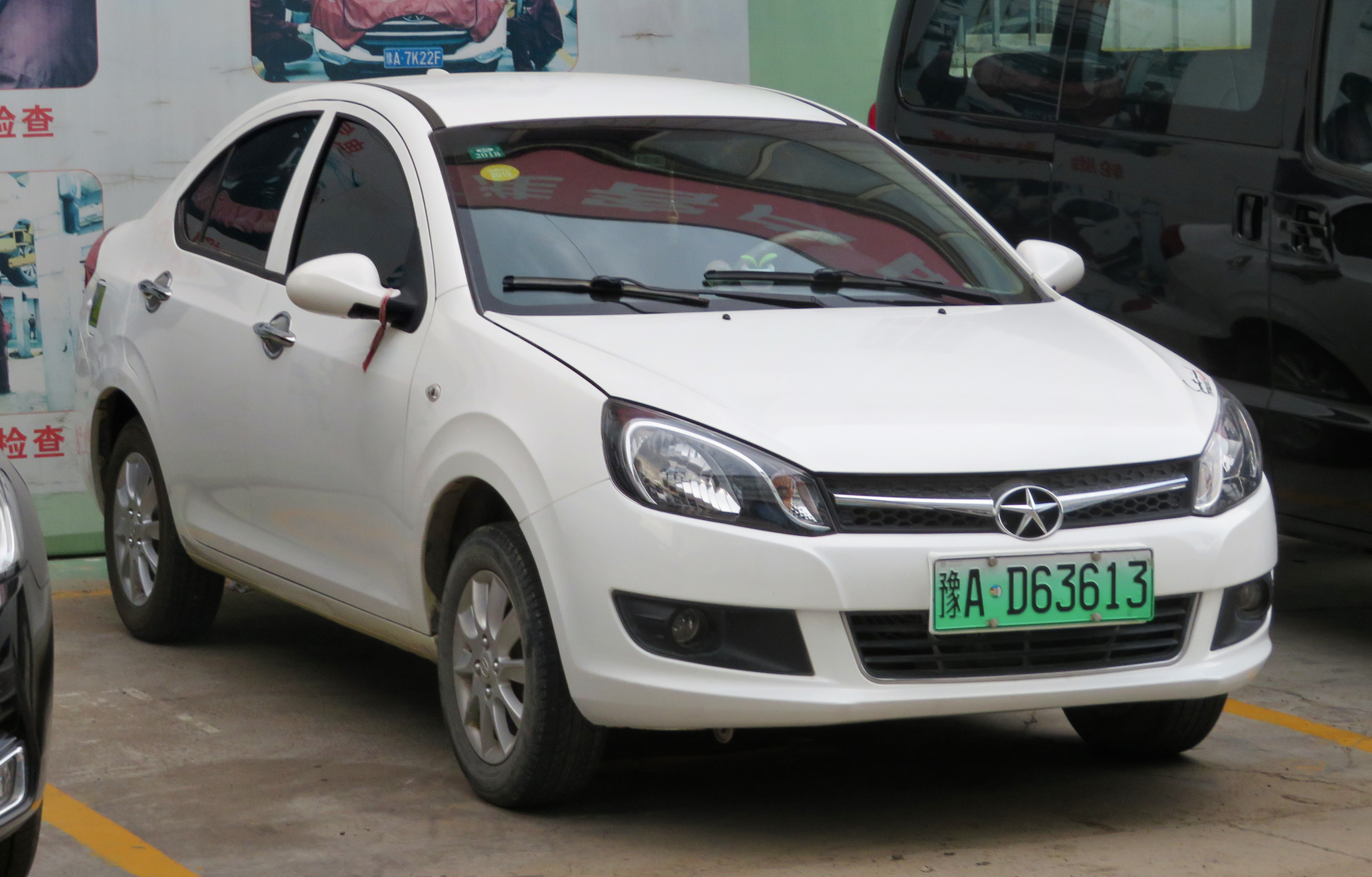
JAC iEV4

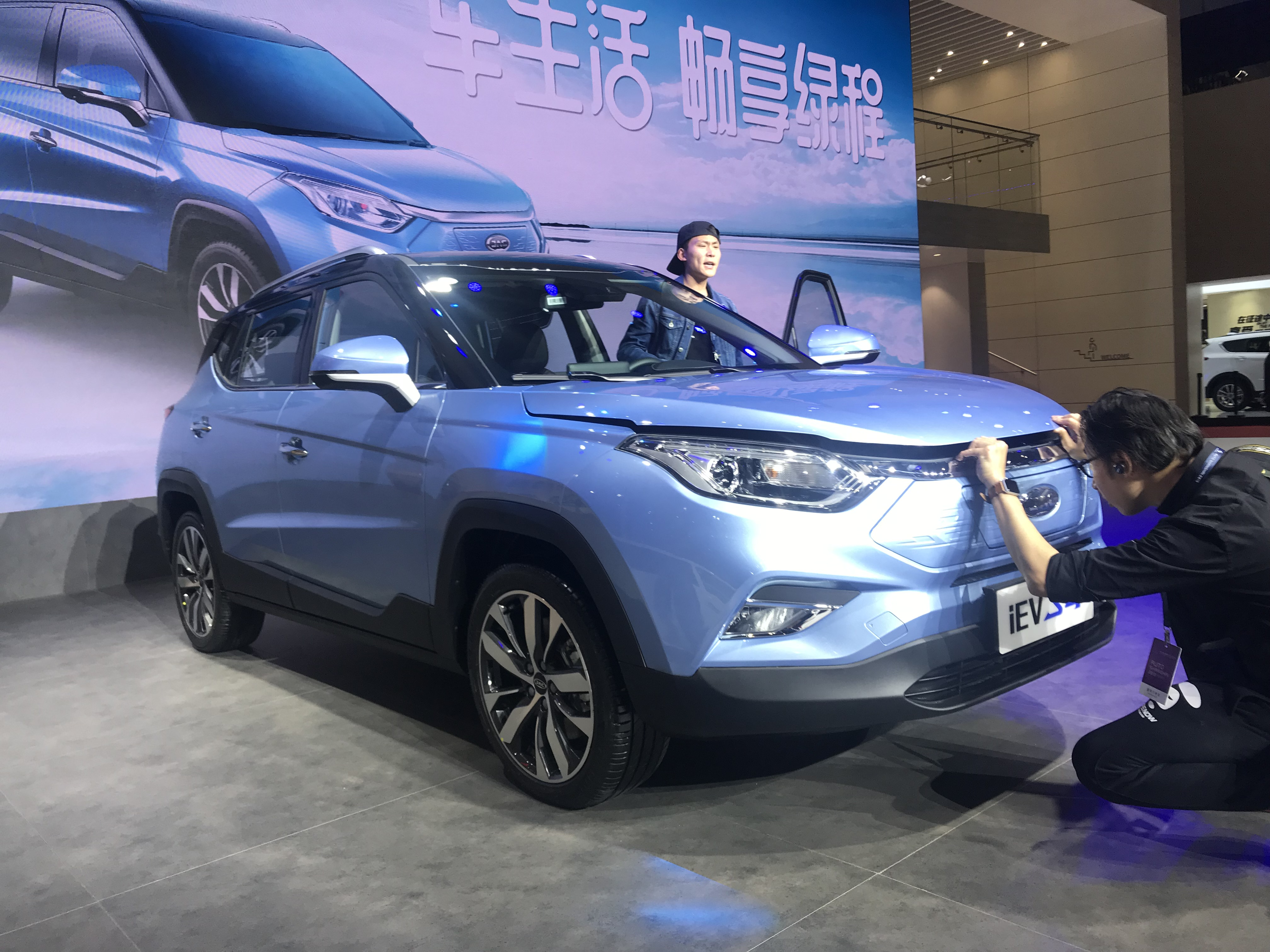
JAC iEVS4

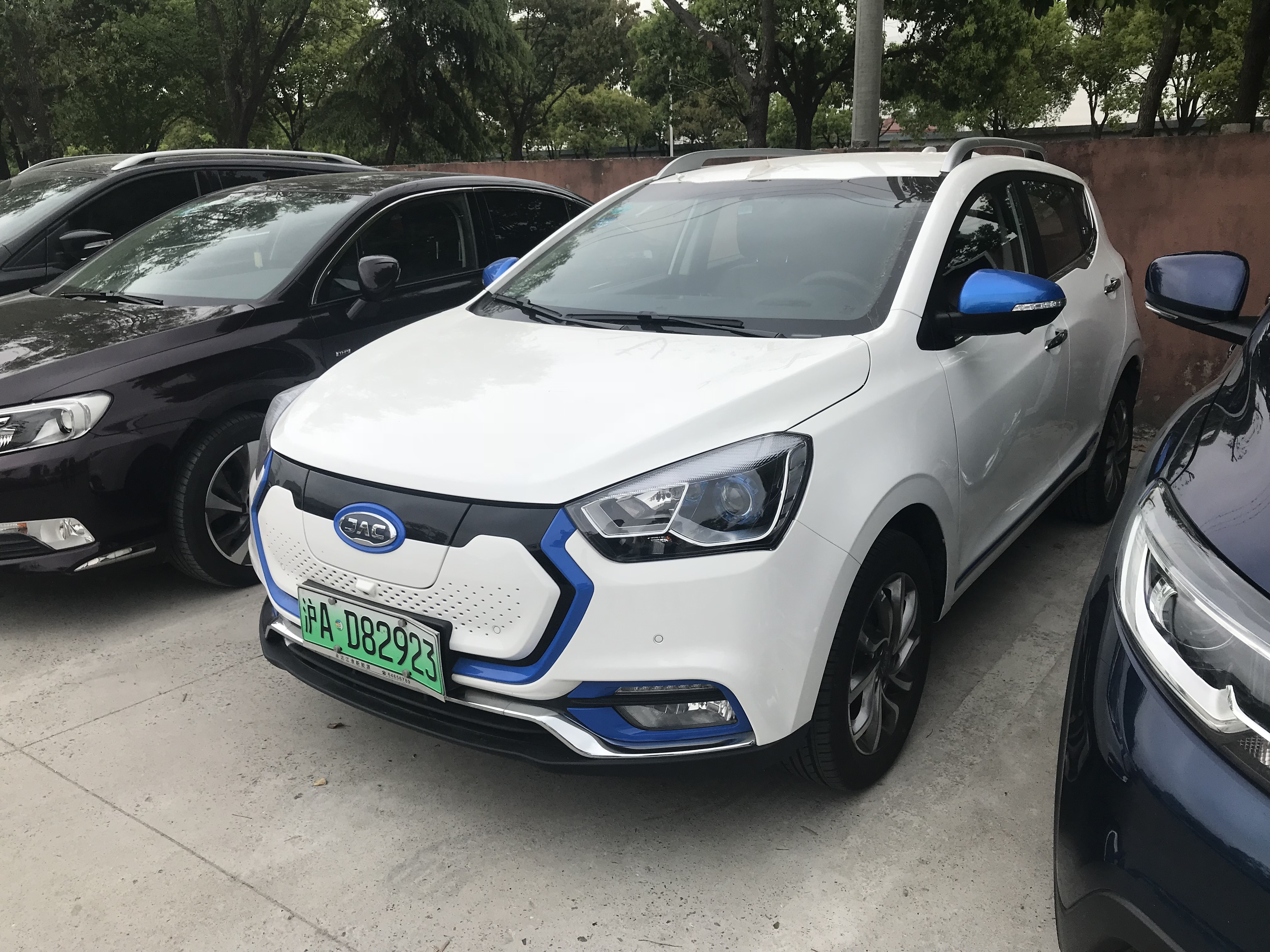
JAC iEV7S

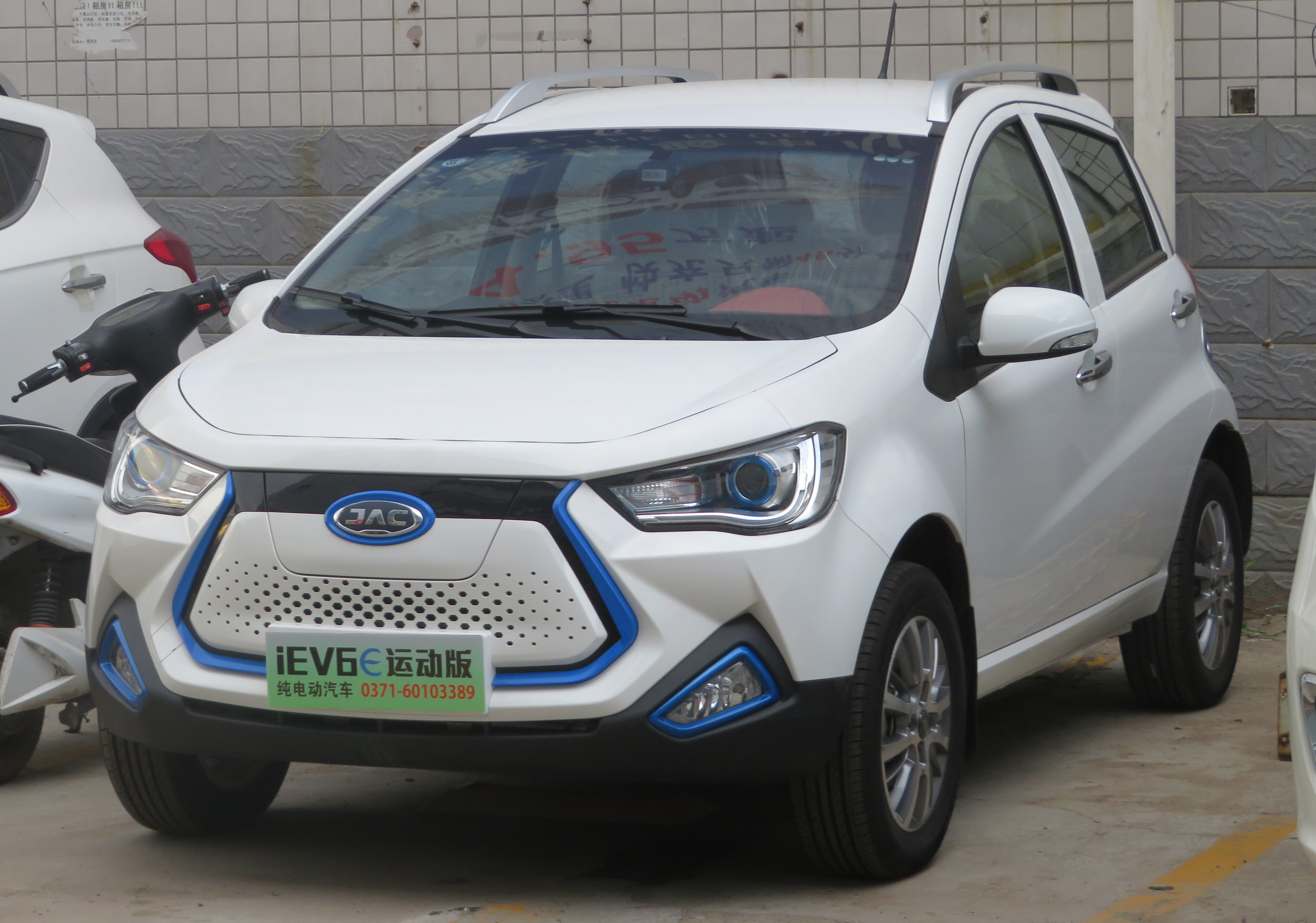
JAC iEV6E

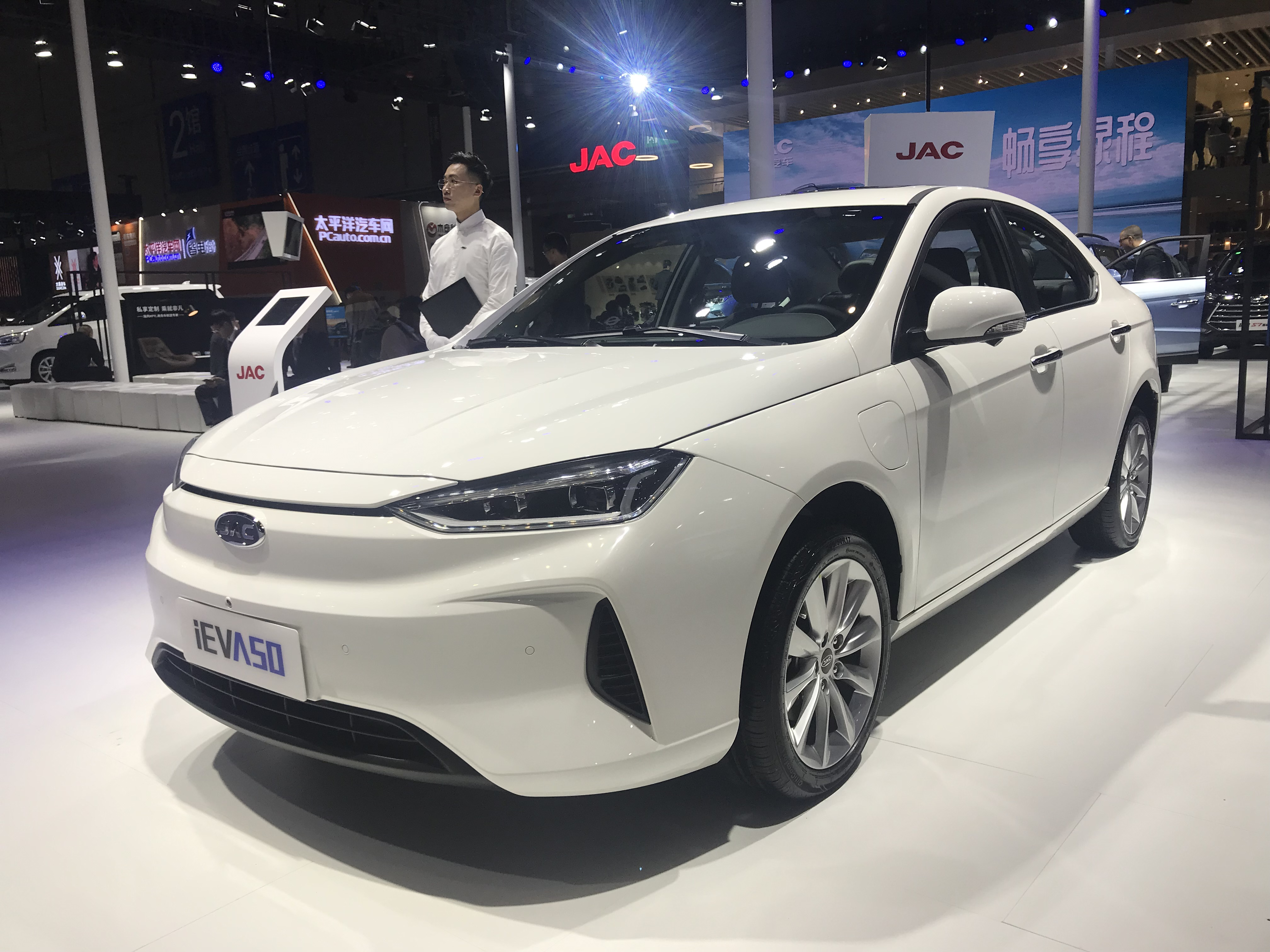
JAC iEVA50

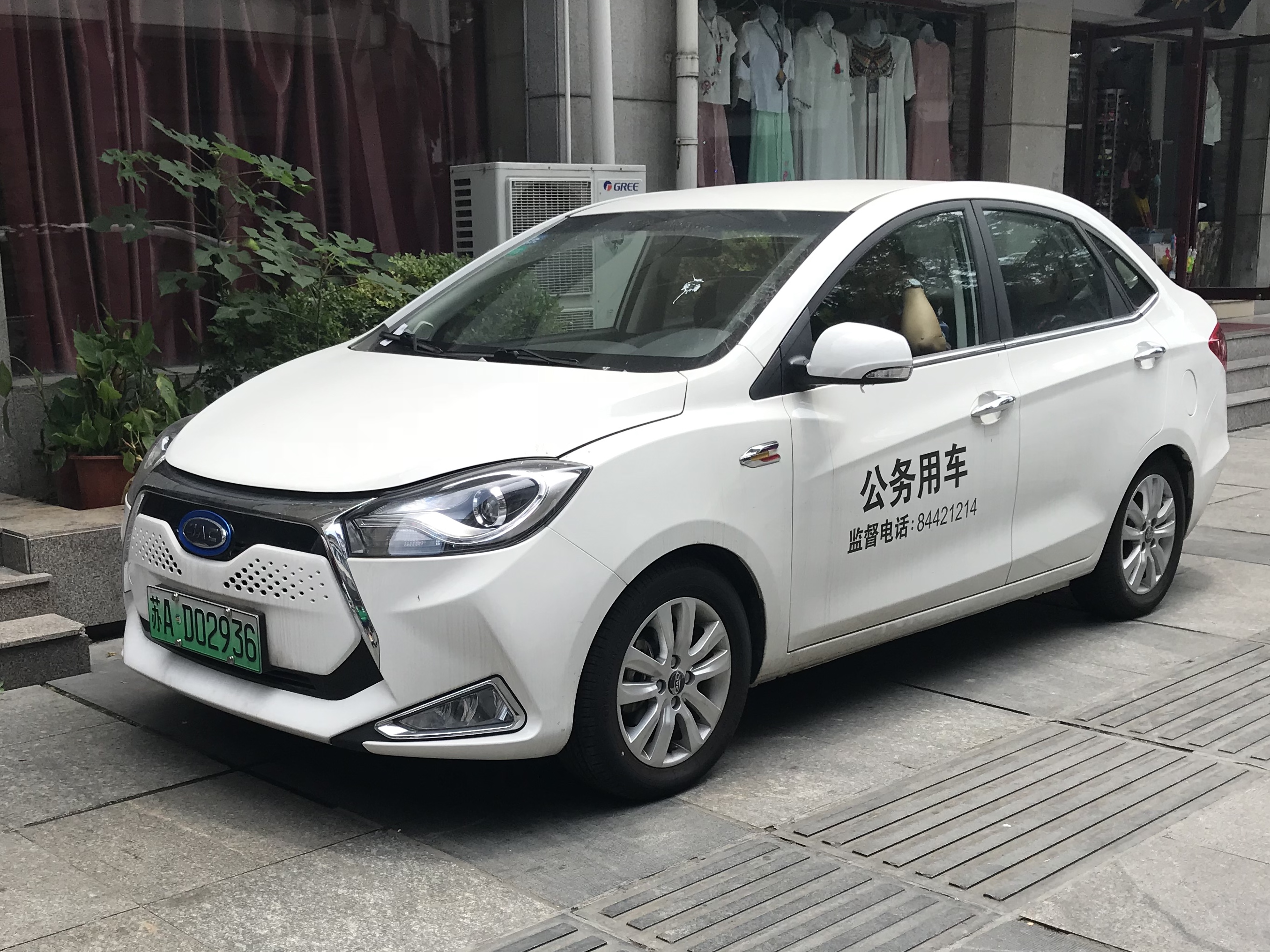
JAC iEV7

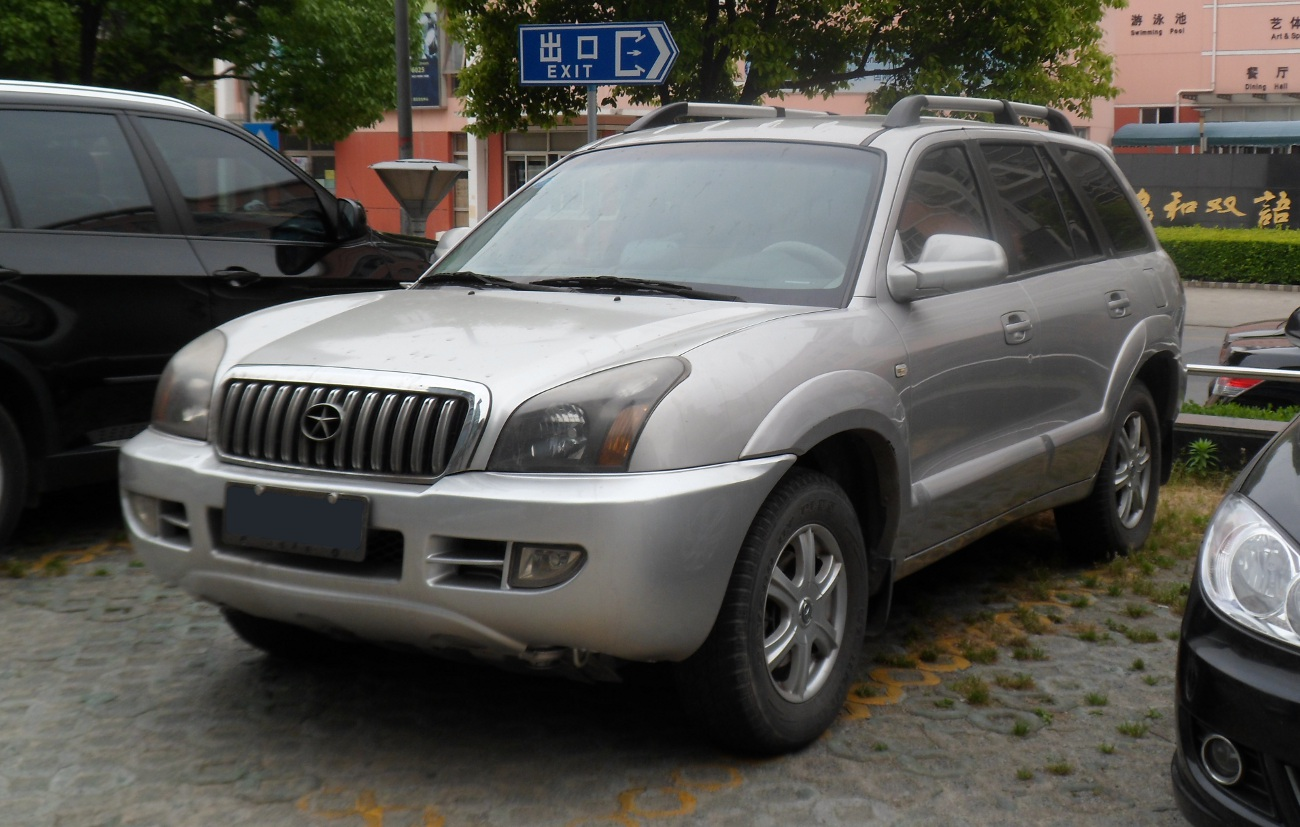
JAC Rein

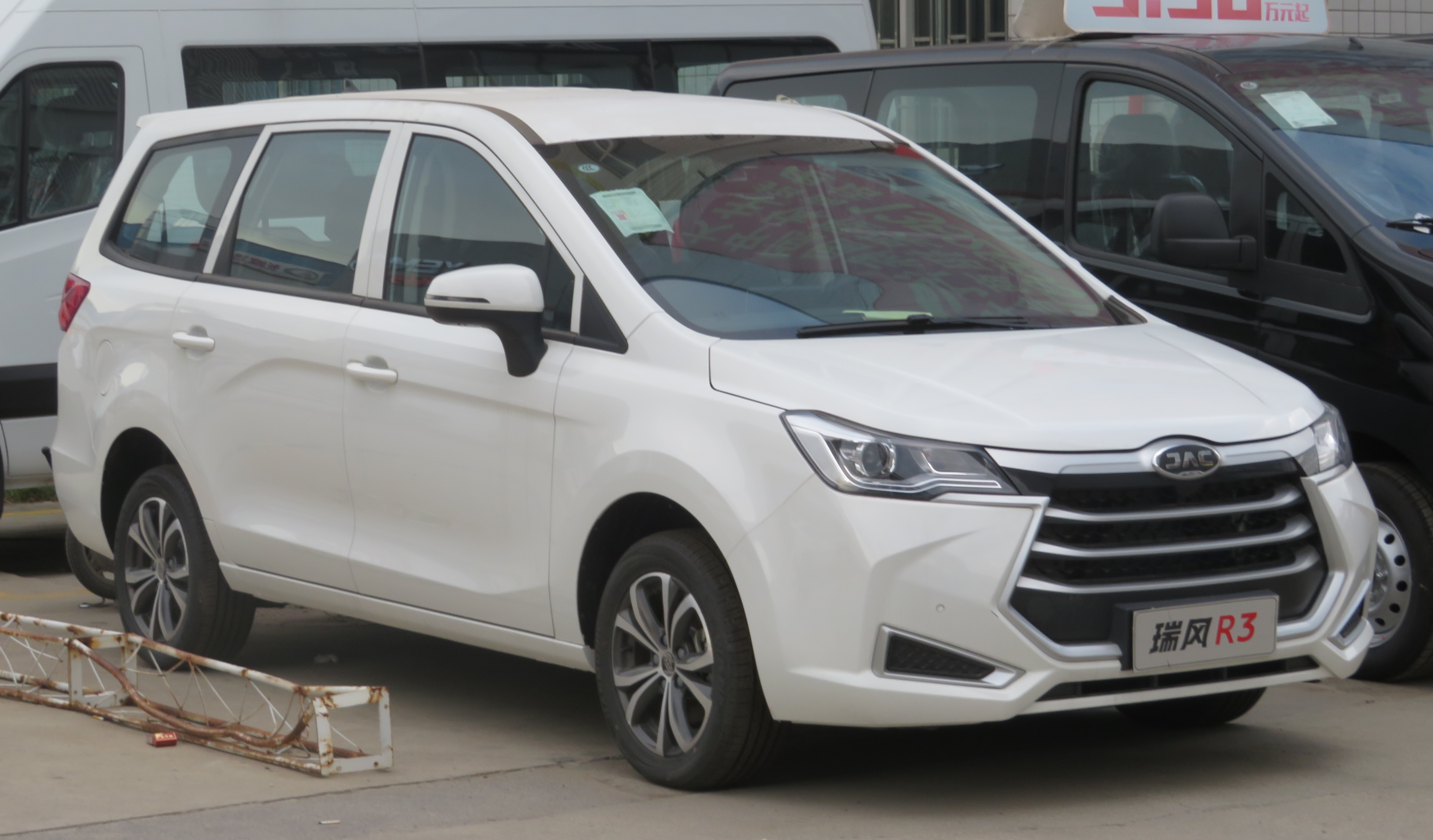
Refine R3

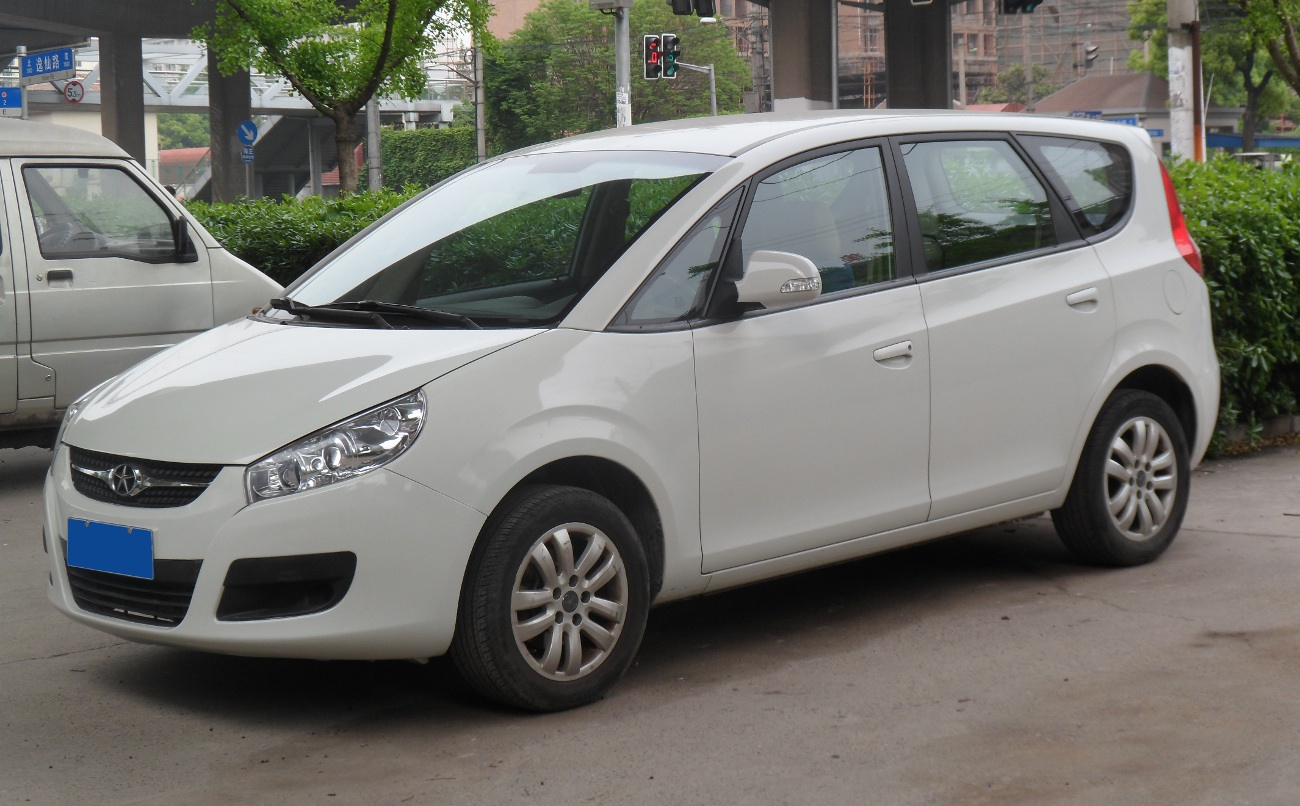
Refine M2 (Heyue RS)

=== JAC Refine ===
- JAC Refine M5/ L5 (2002–2025), full-size minivan
- JAC Refine M6/ M6 MAX/ L6 MAX (2013–2025), full-size minivan
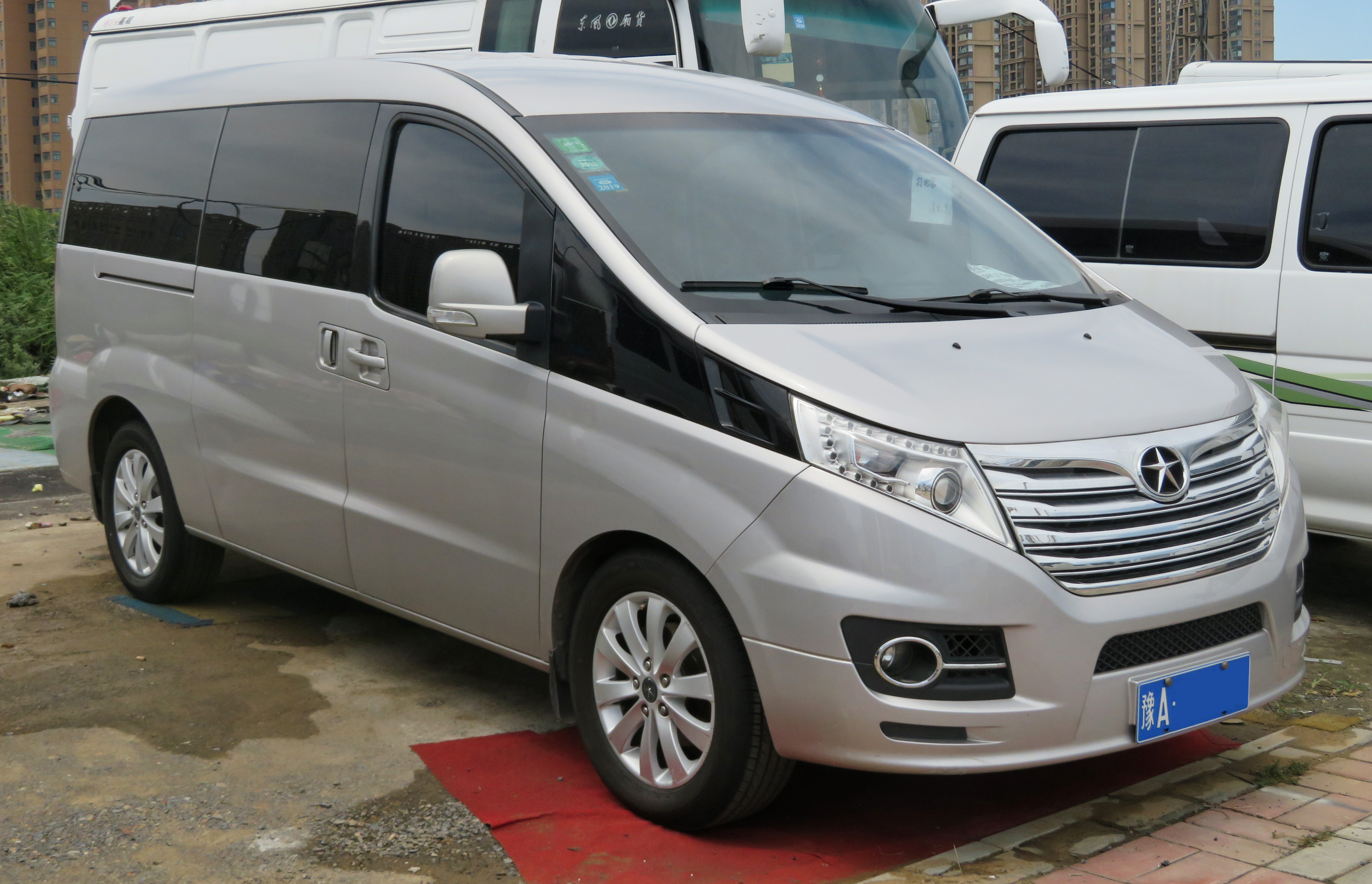
JAC Refine M5

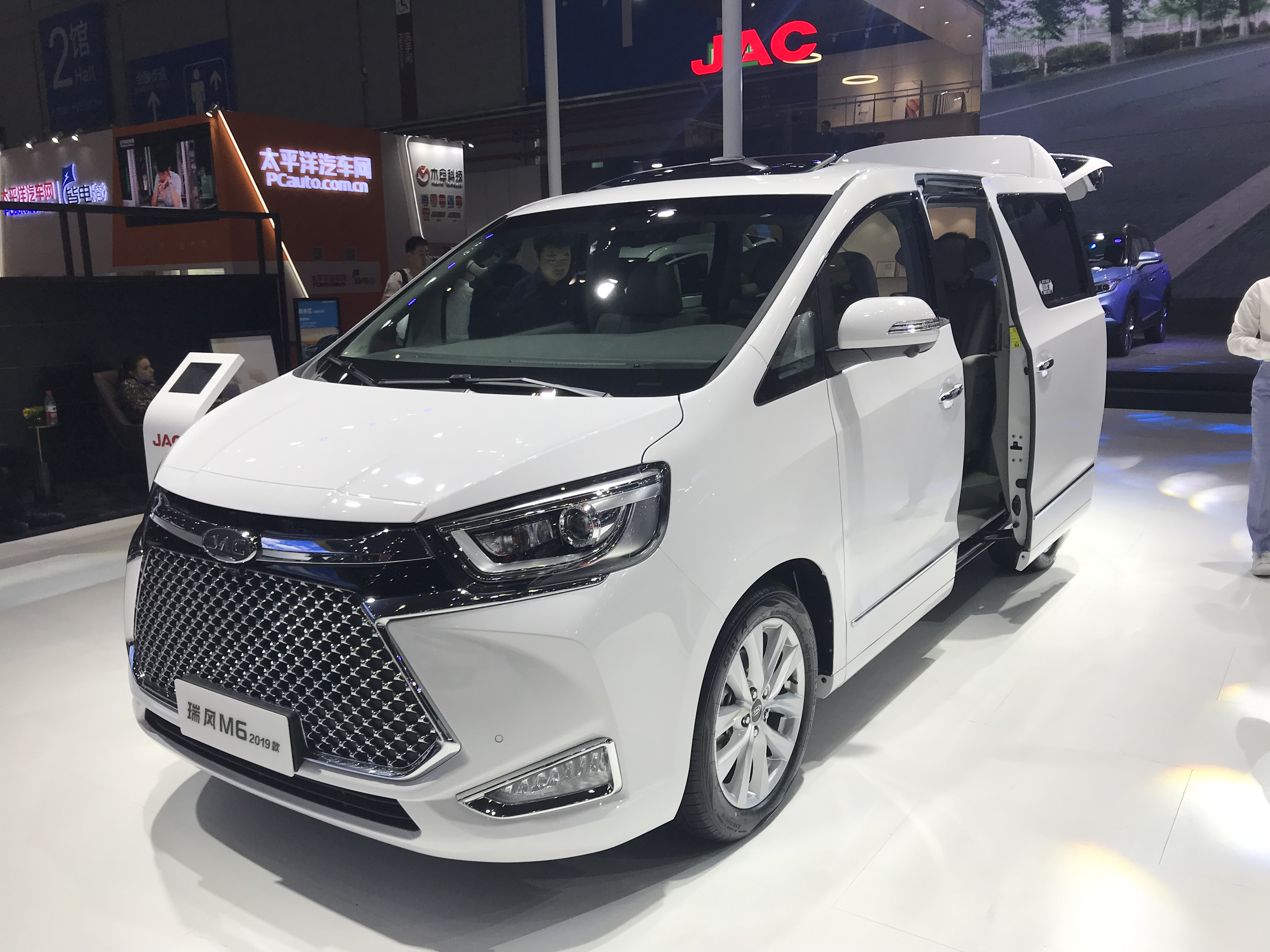
JAC Refine L6 MAX

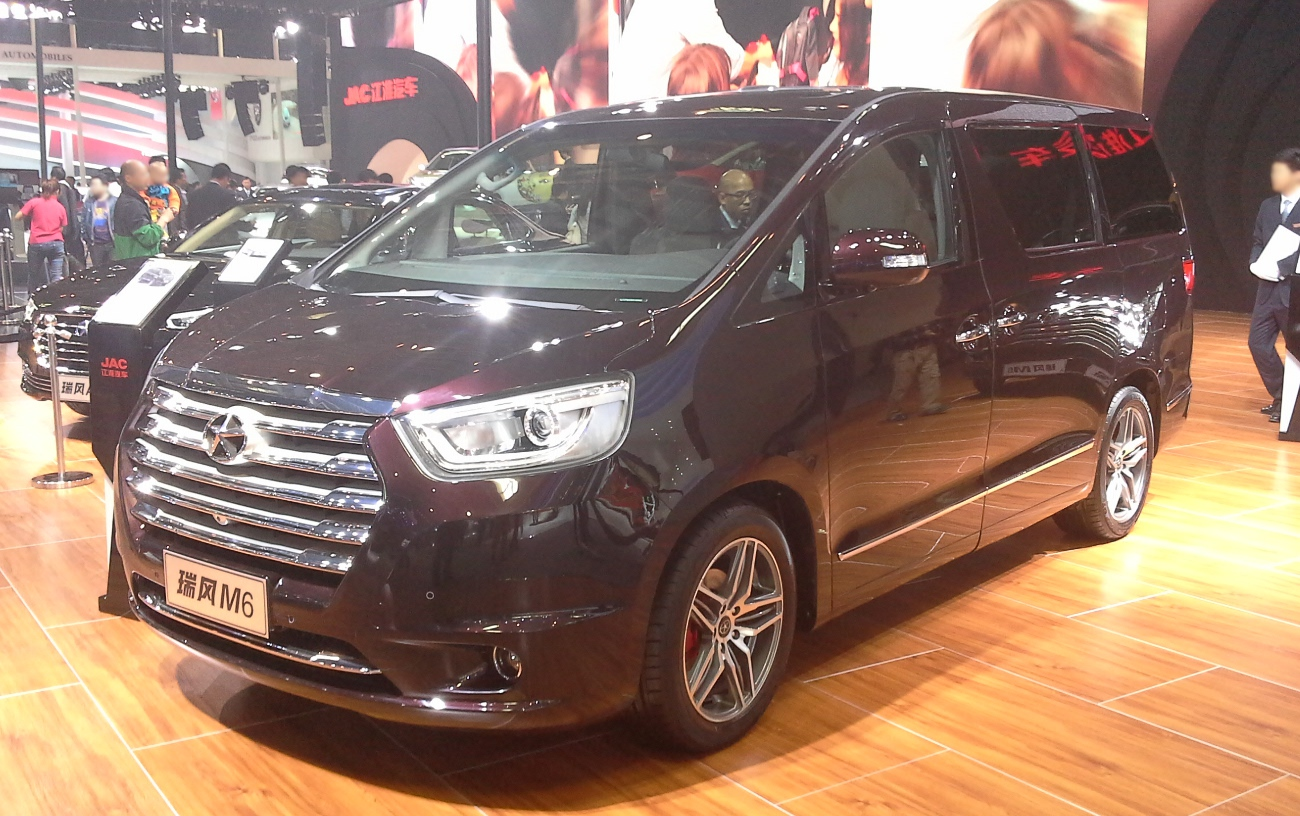
JAC Refine M6

== Light trucks, pickups, and vans ==
- JAC Ruiling/ JAC Reni/ JAC K5
- V7
- Hunter (悍途)
- Shuailing (帅铃)
  - Shuailing G series
  - Shuailing H series
  - Shuailing I series
  - Shuailing K series
  - Shuailing S series
  - Shuailing W series
  - Shuailing X series
  - Shuailing T6 Pickup
  - Shuailing T8 Pickup
- Junling (骏铃)
  - Junling E series
  - Junling V series
  - Junling G series
- Kangling/ HY(康铃)
  - K series
  - H series
  - X series
  - G series
- Lanmao (蓝猫), electric logistics
  - M1
  - M2
- Kala (卡拉), electric logistics
- Van Baolu (Van宝路), electric logistics
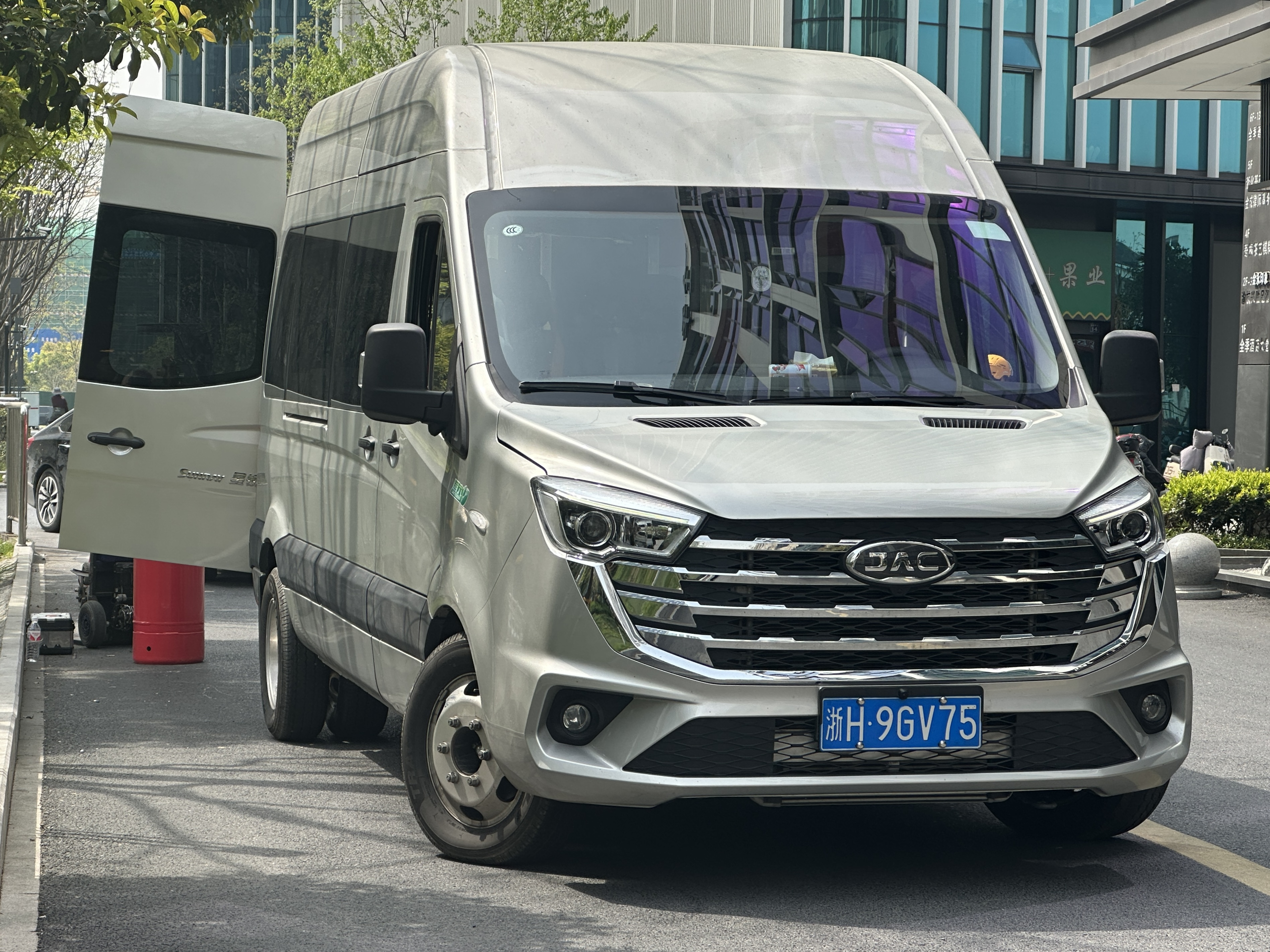
JAC Sunray facelift

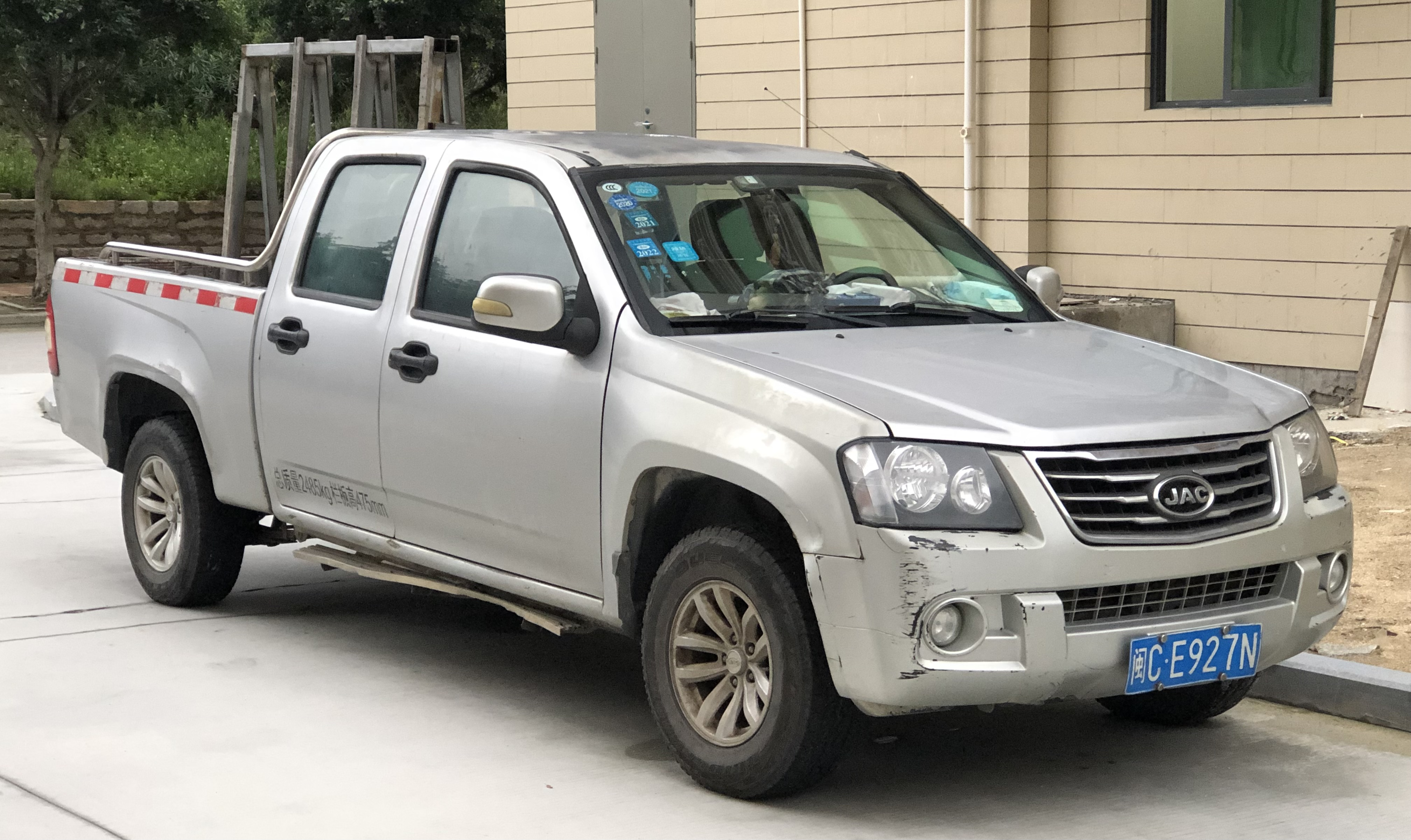
JAC Ruiling

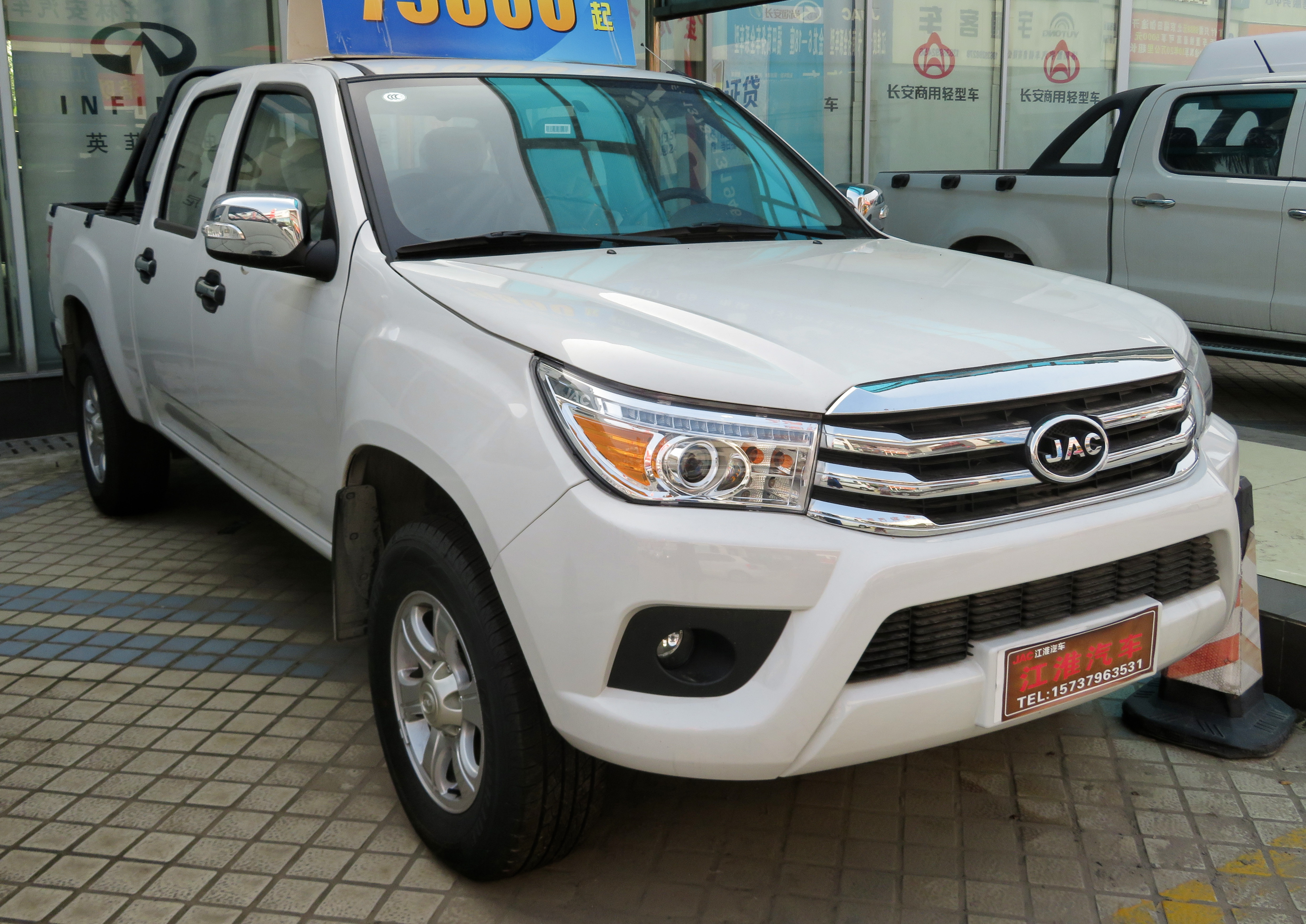
JAC V7

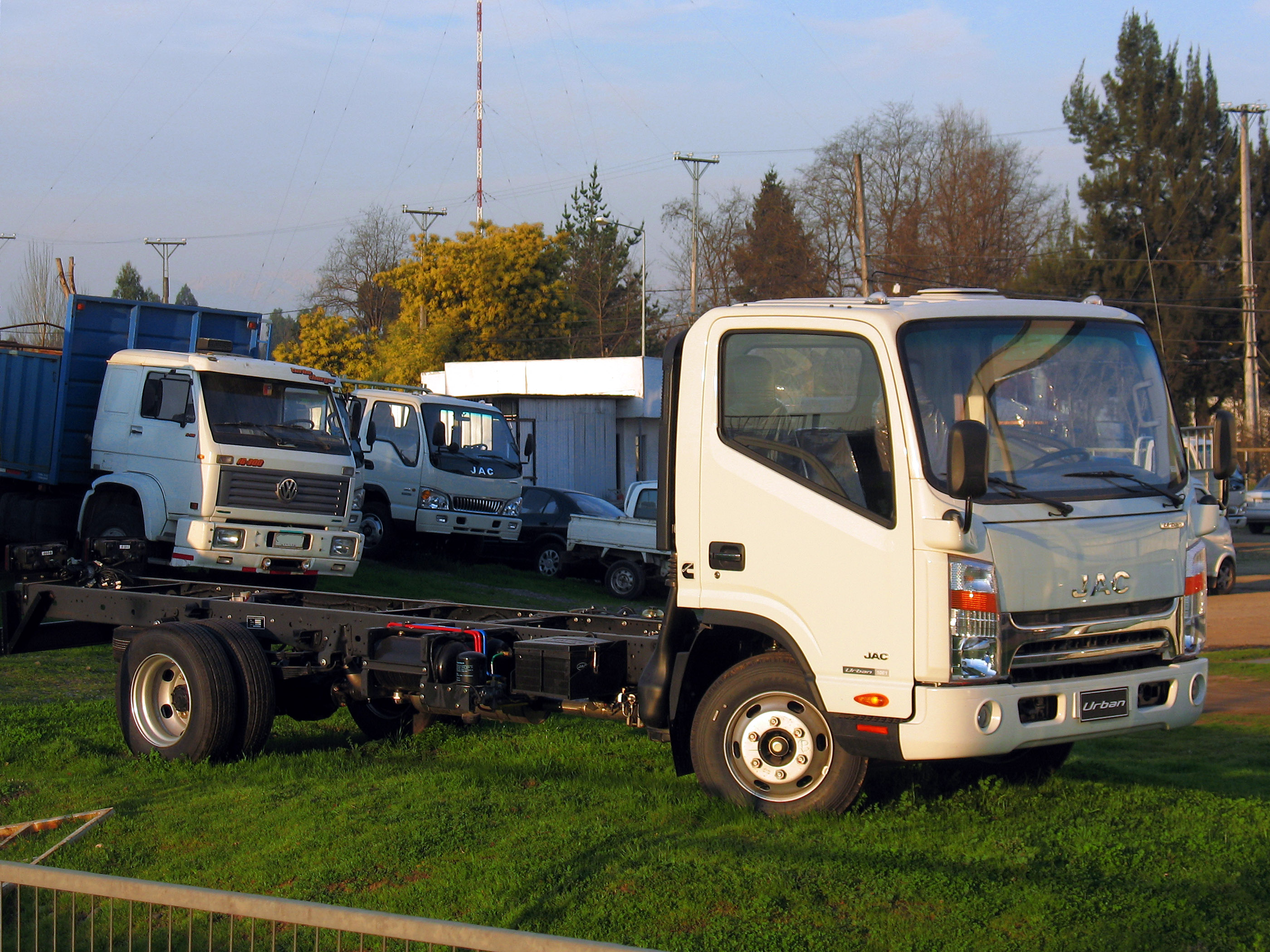
Shuailing H series

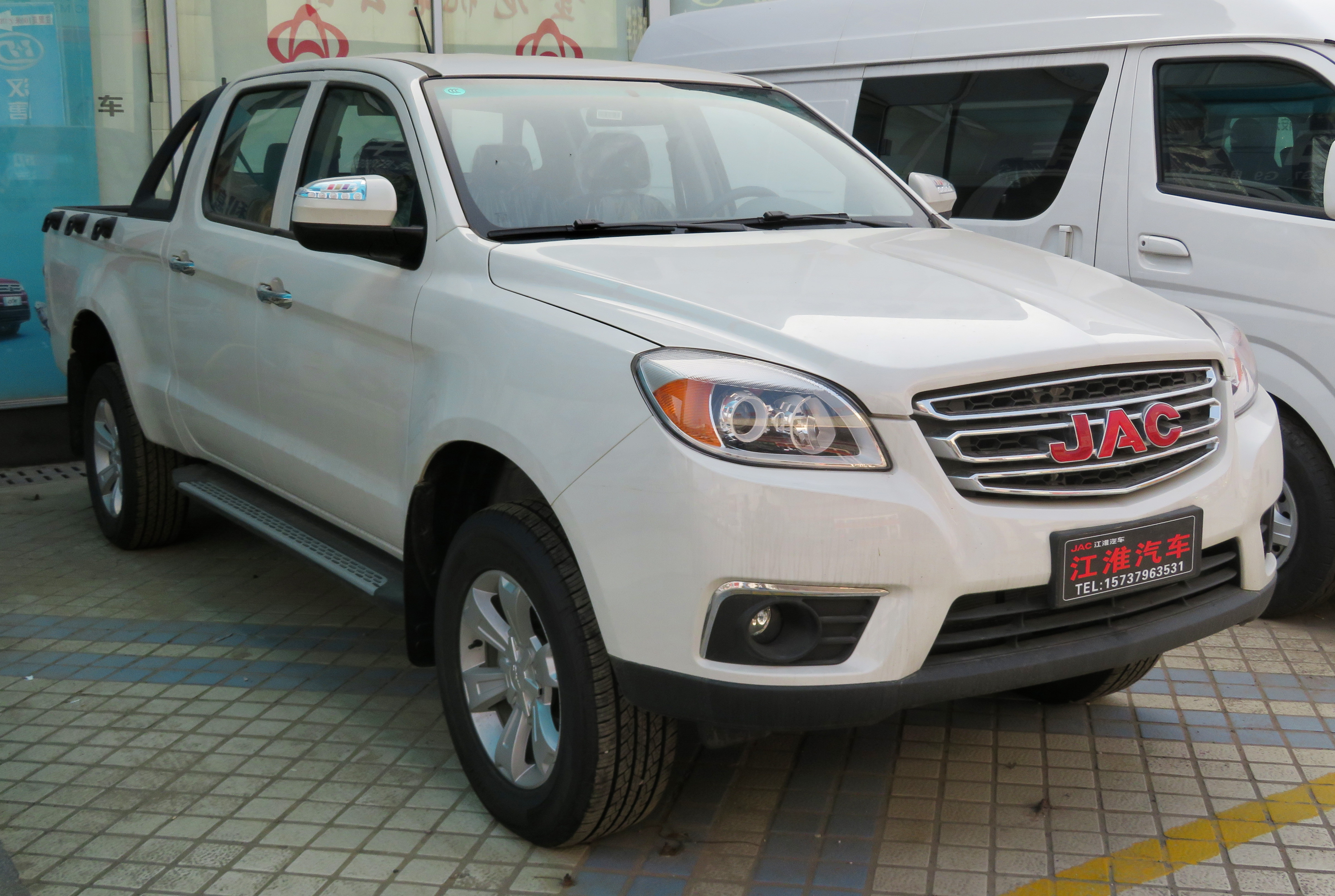
Shuailing T6 Pickup

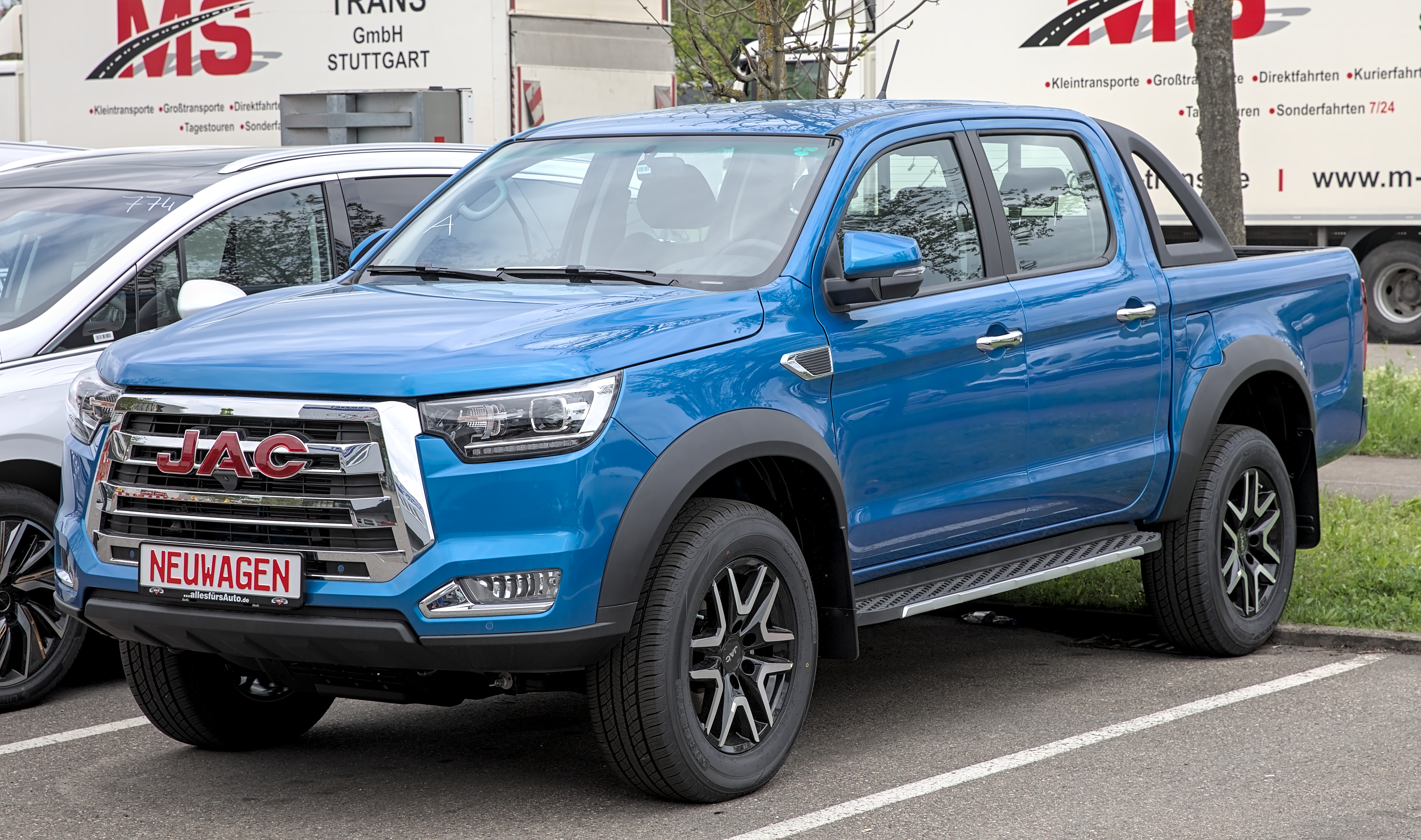
Shuailing T8 Pickup

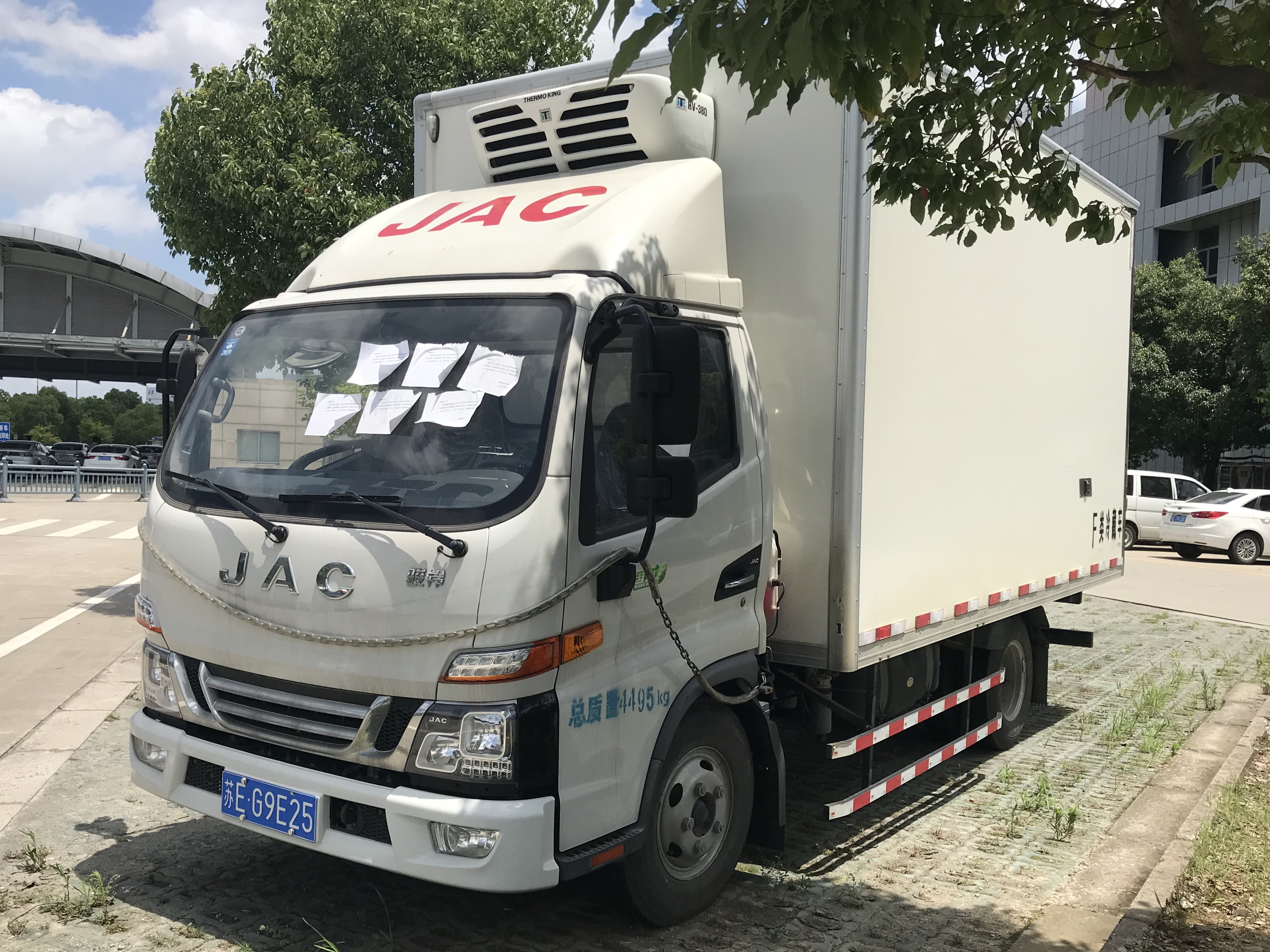
Junling V series

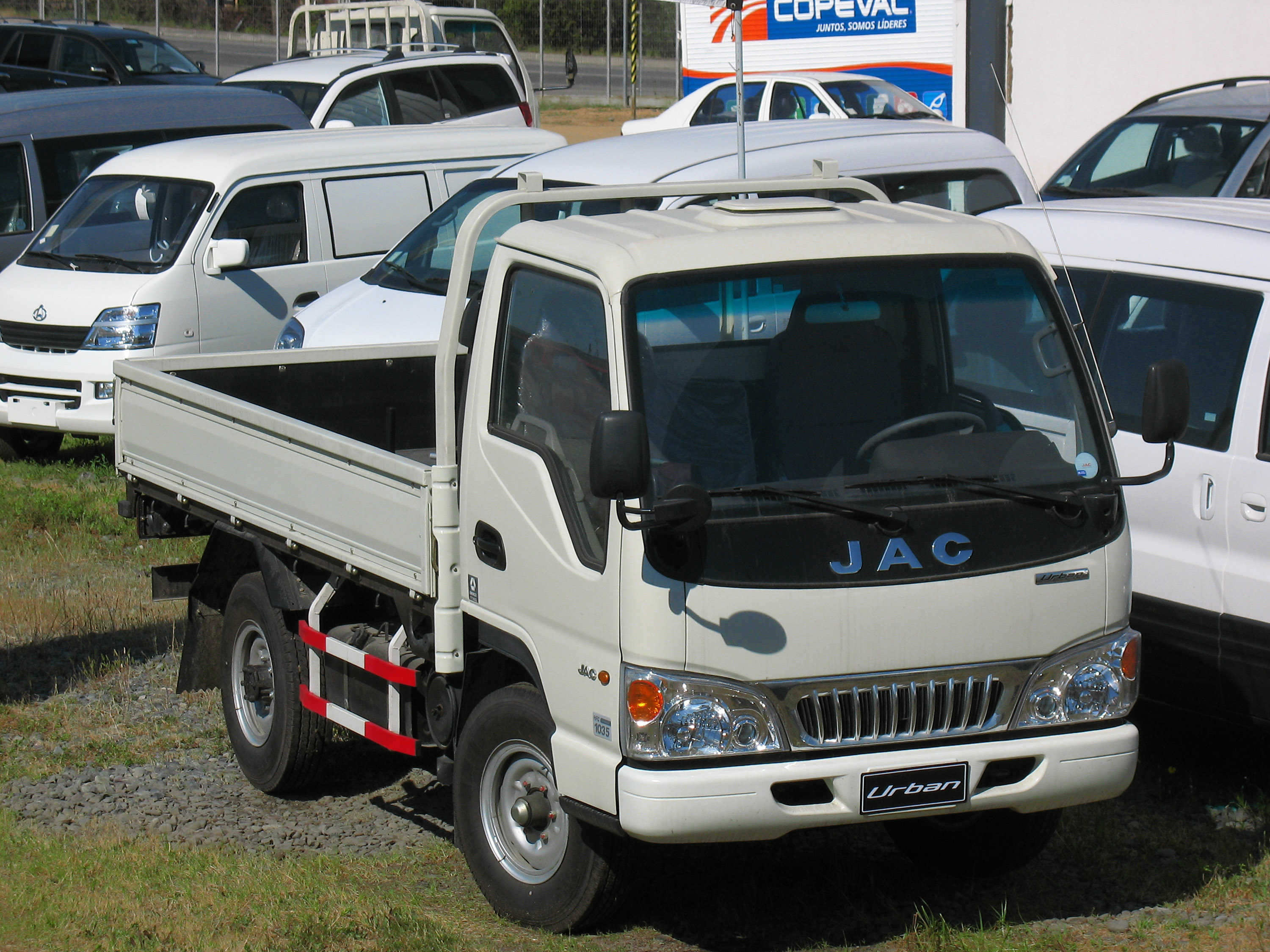
Kangling H series H3

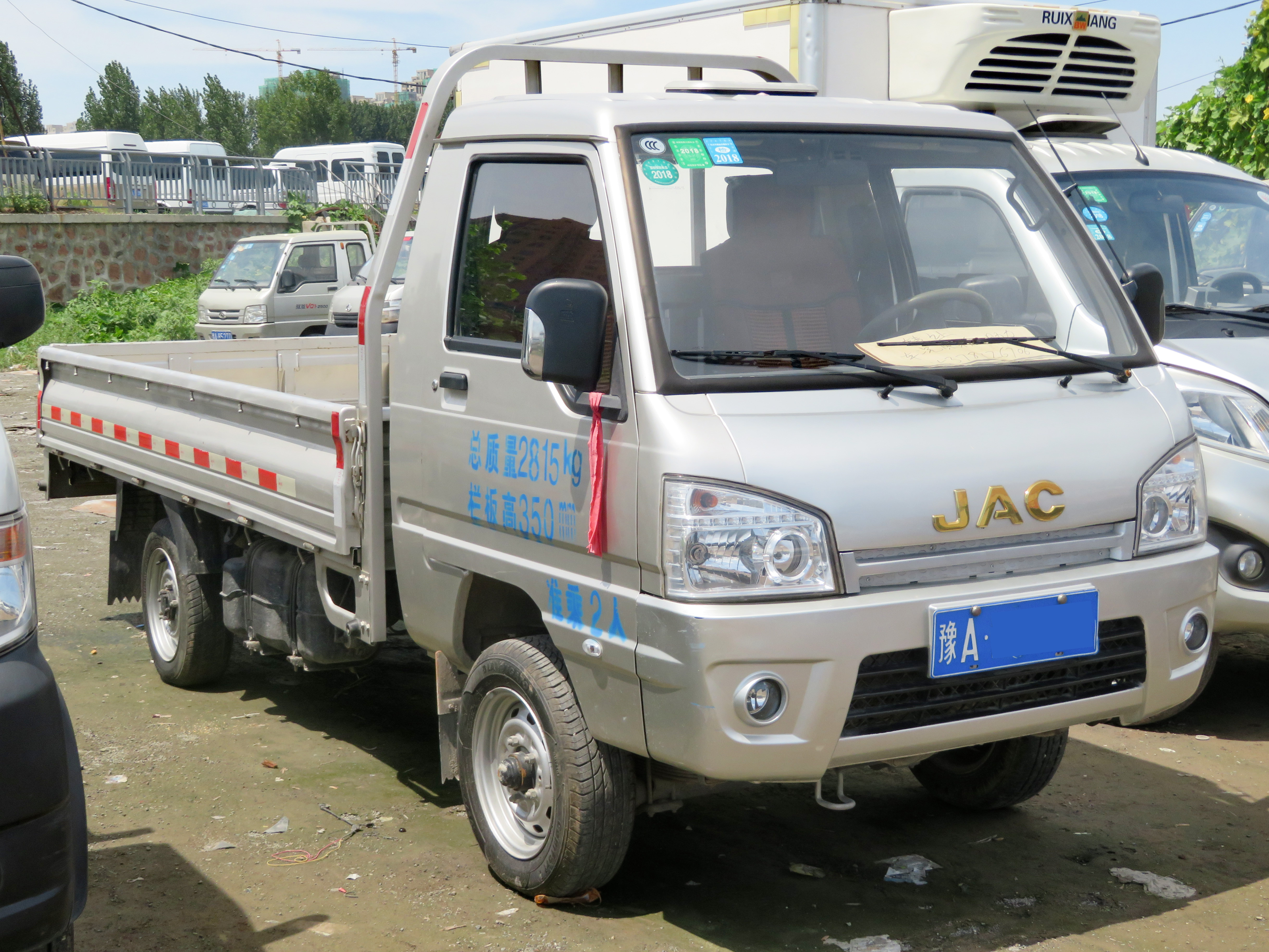
A JAC Kangling X3

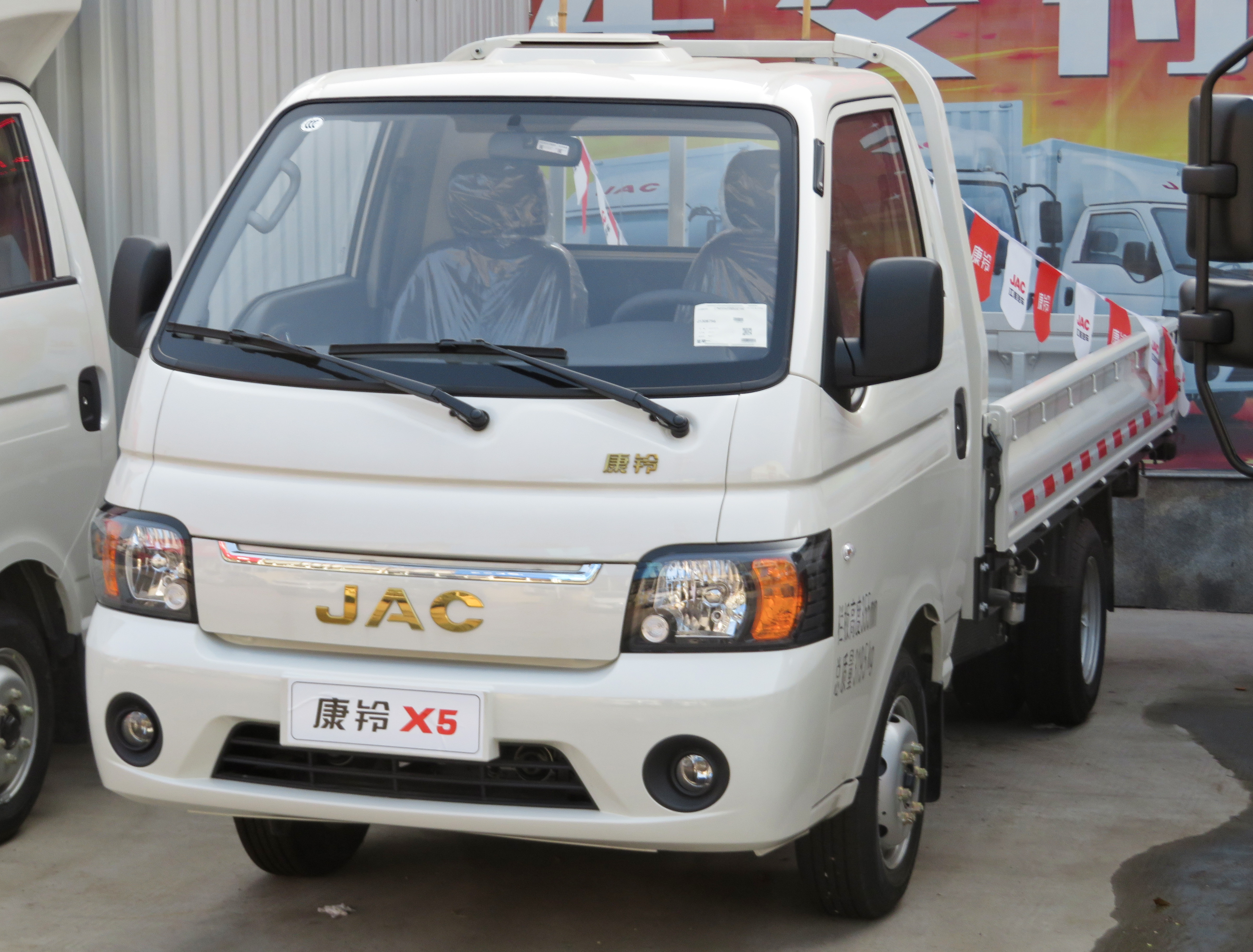
A JAC Kangling X5

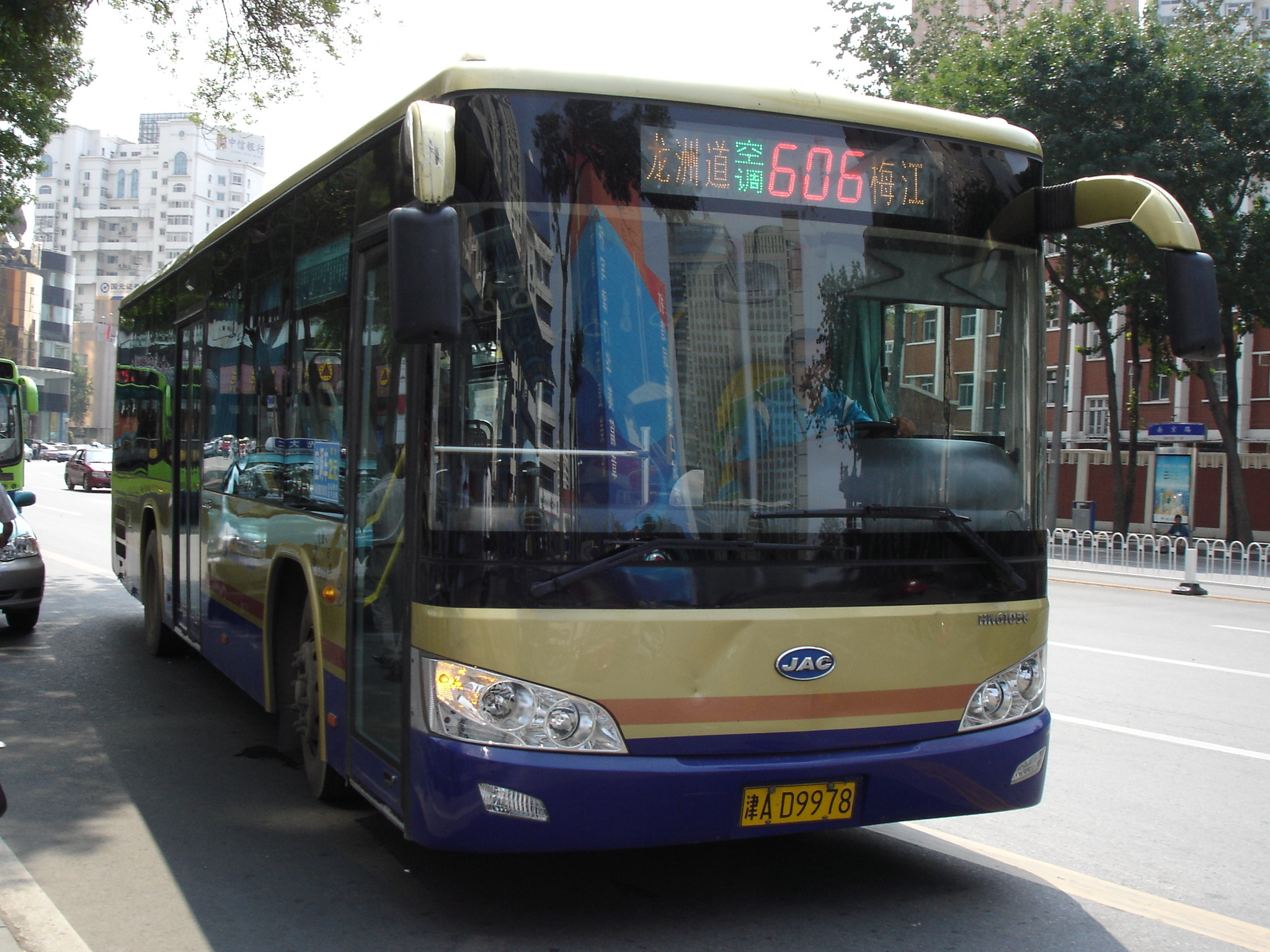
A JAC HK6105G bus

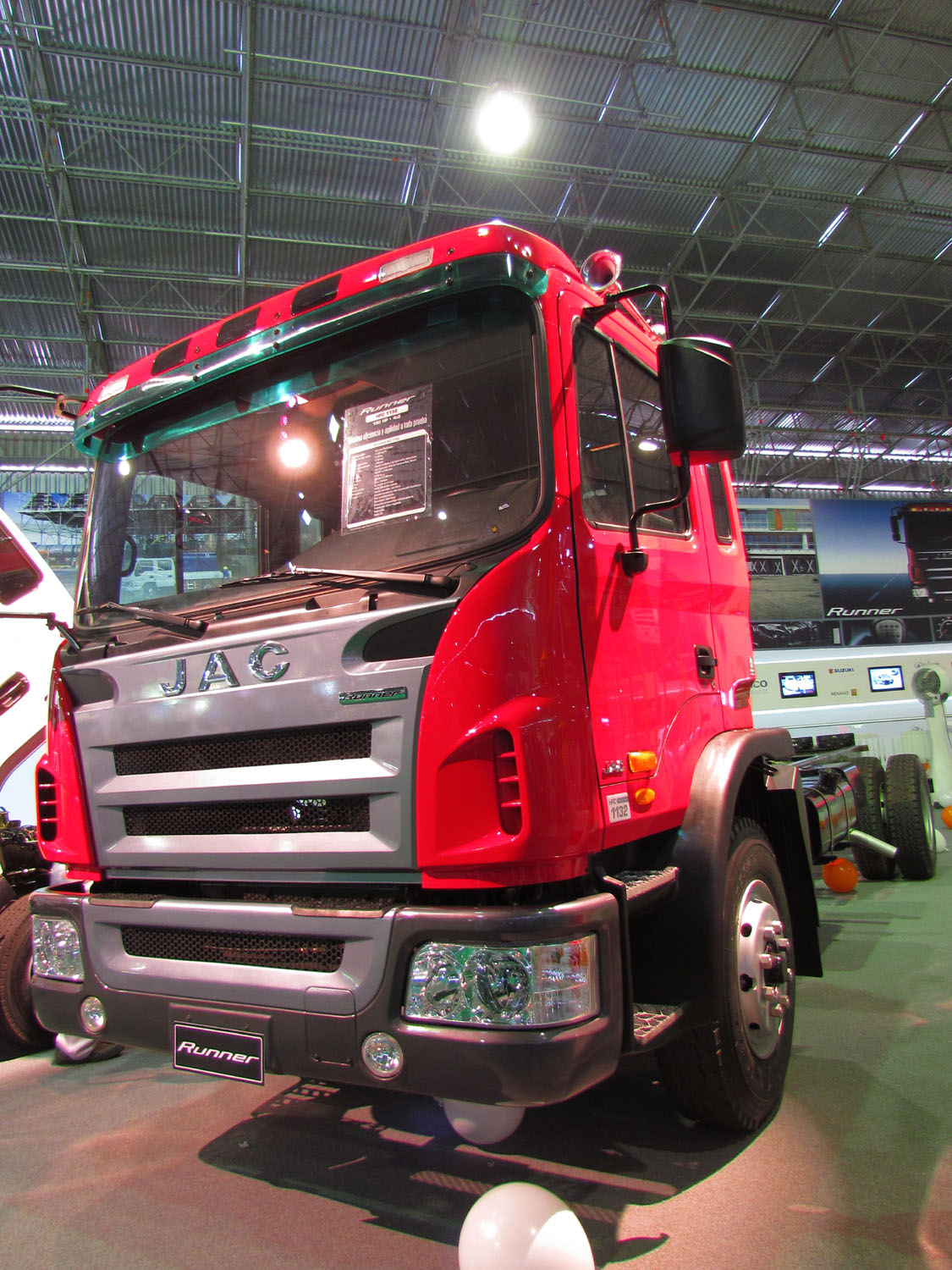
A JAC Runner HFC truck

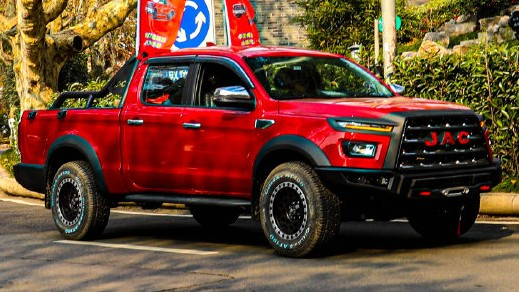
JAC Hunter

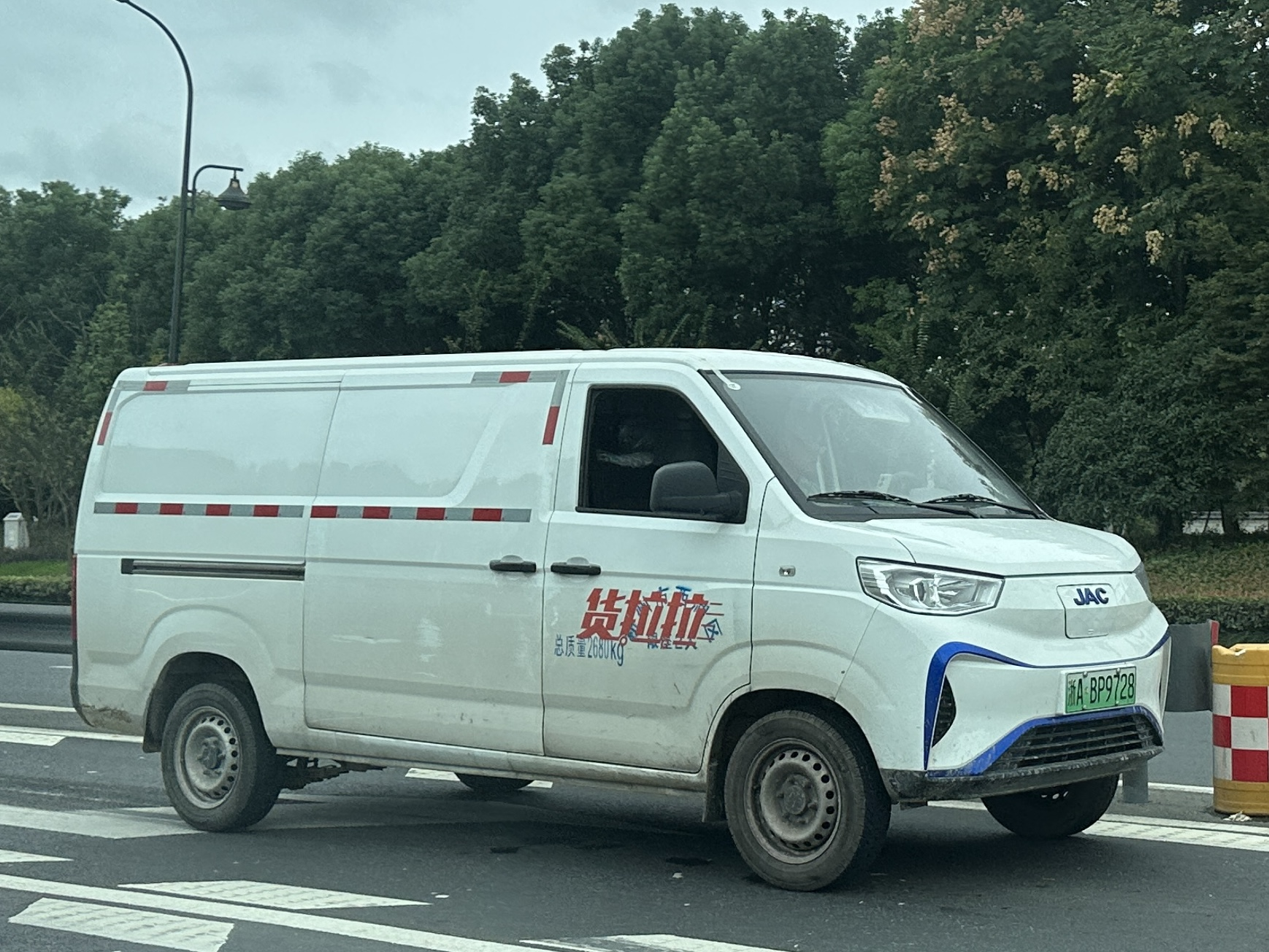
JAC Lanmao M1

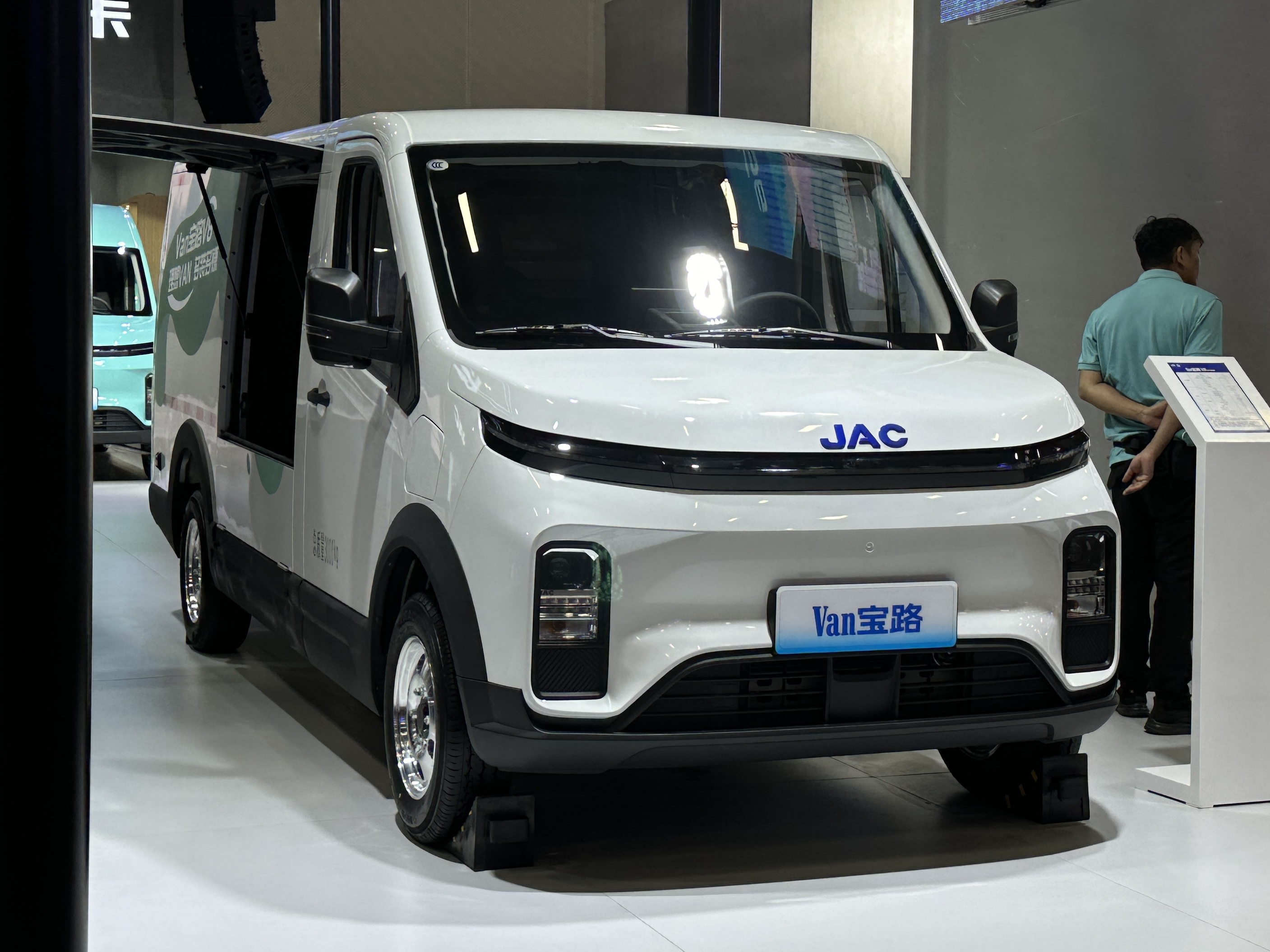
JAC Van Baolu

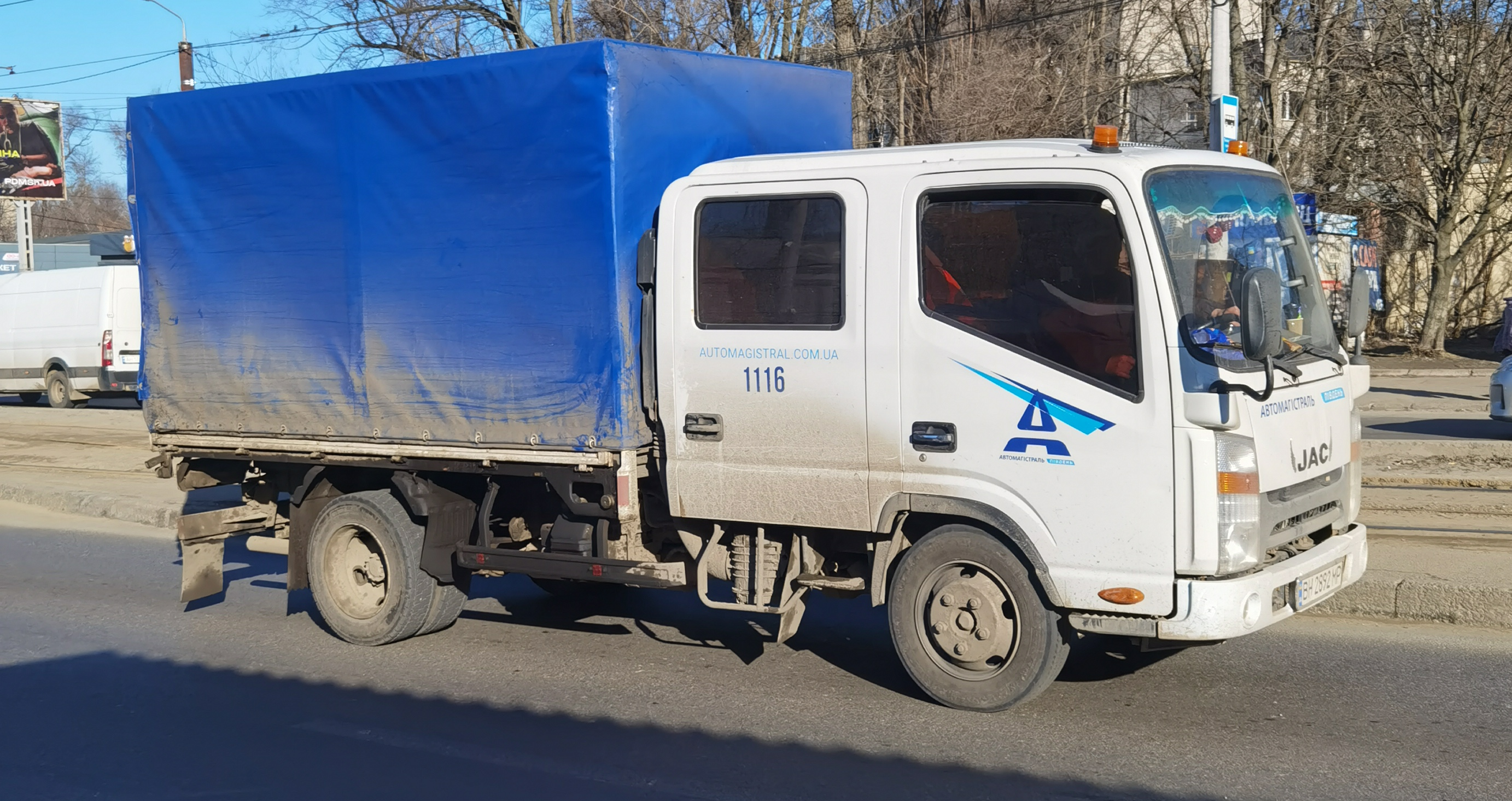
JAC N series

Jac N200

== Logo evolution ==
JAC logo for passenger vehicles (since 2023)

JAC logo for passenger vehicles (2016–2023)

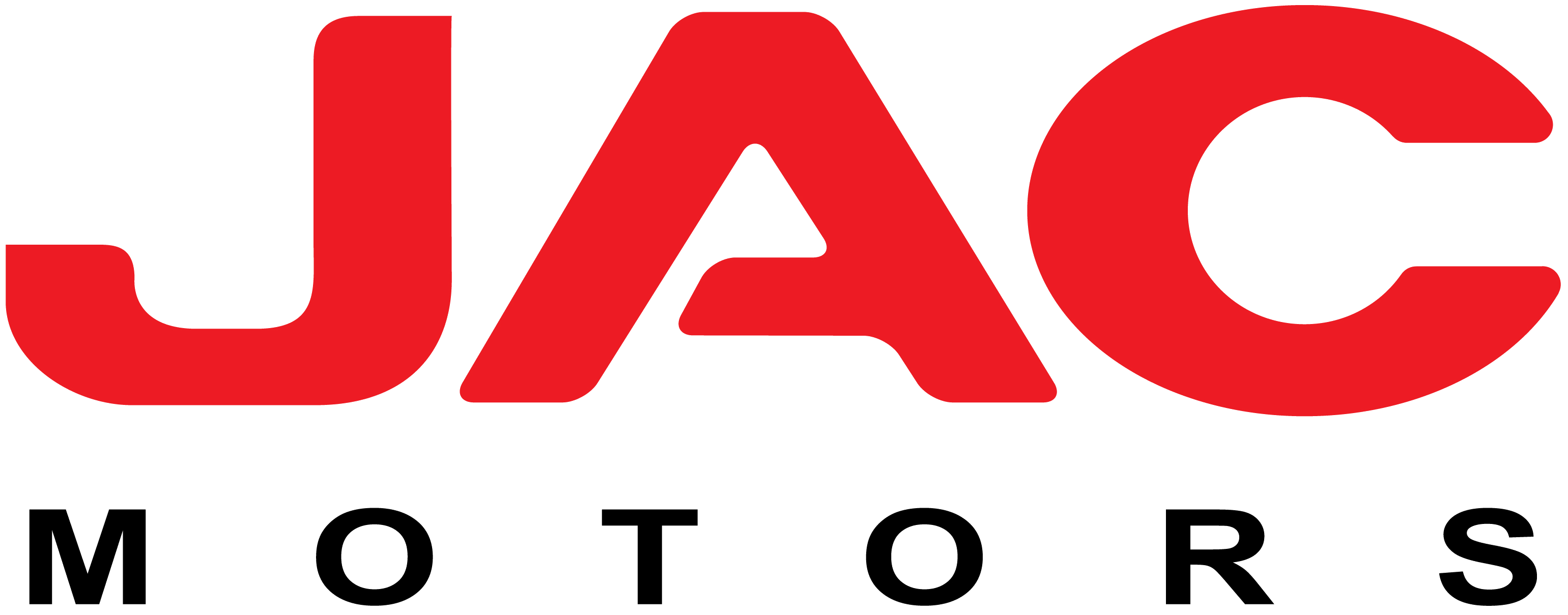
JAC logo for commercial vehicles (since 2016)

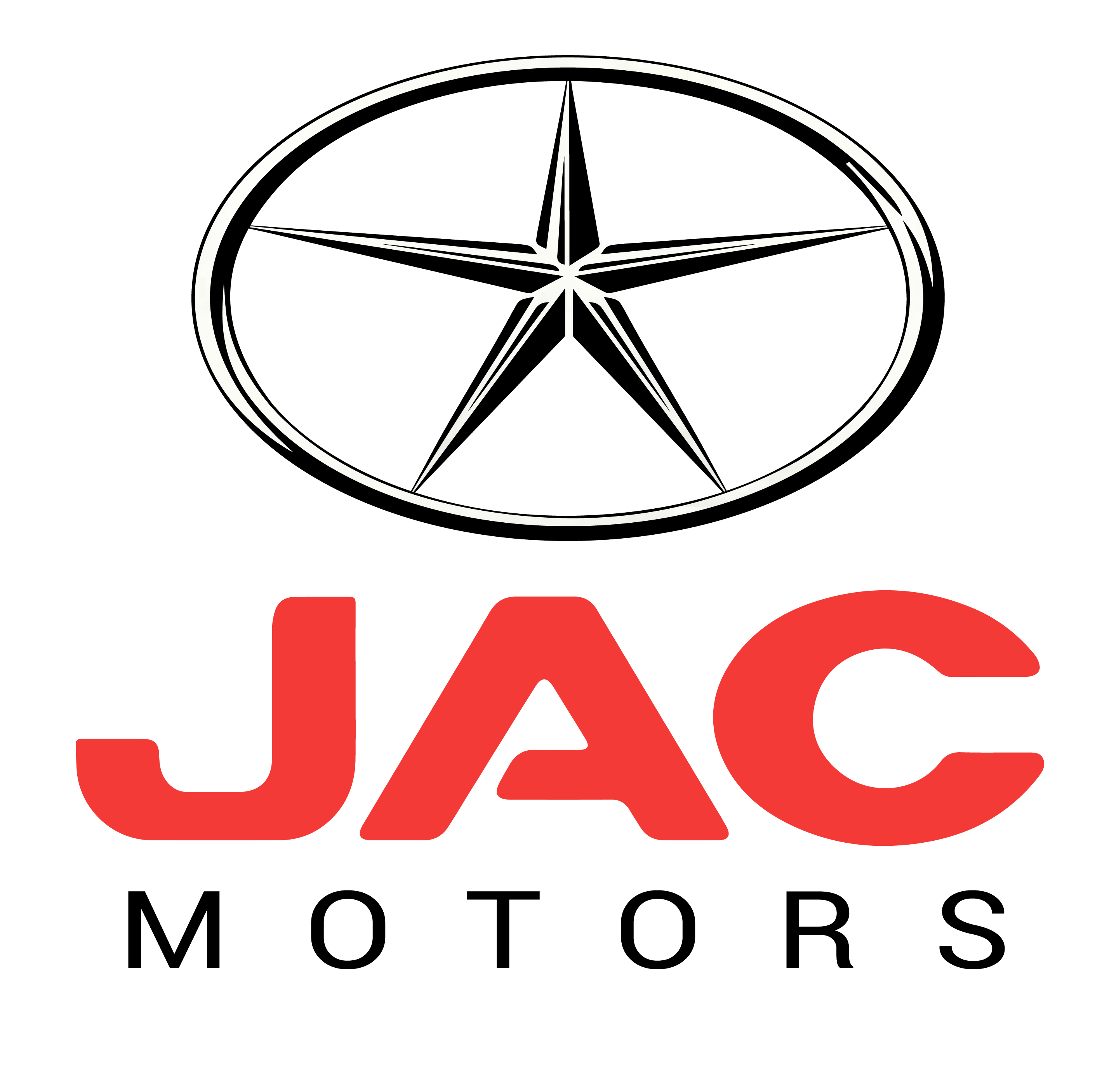
JAC logo for commercial vehicles (1964–2016)

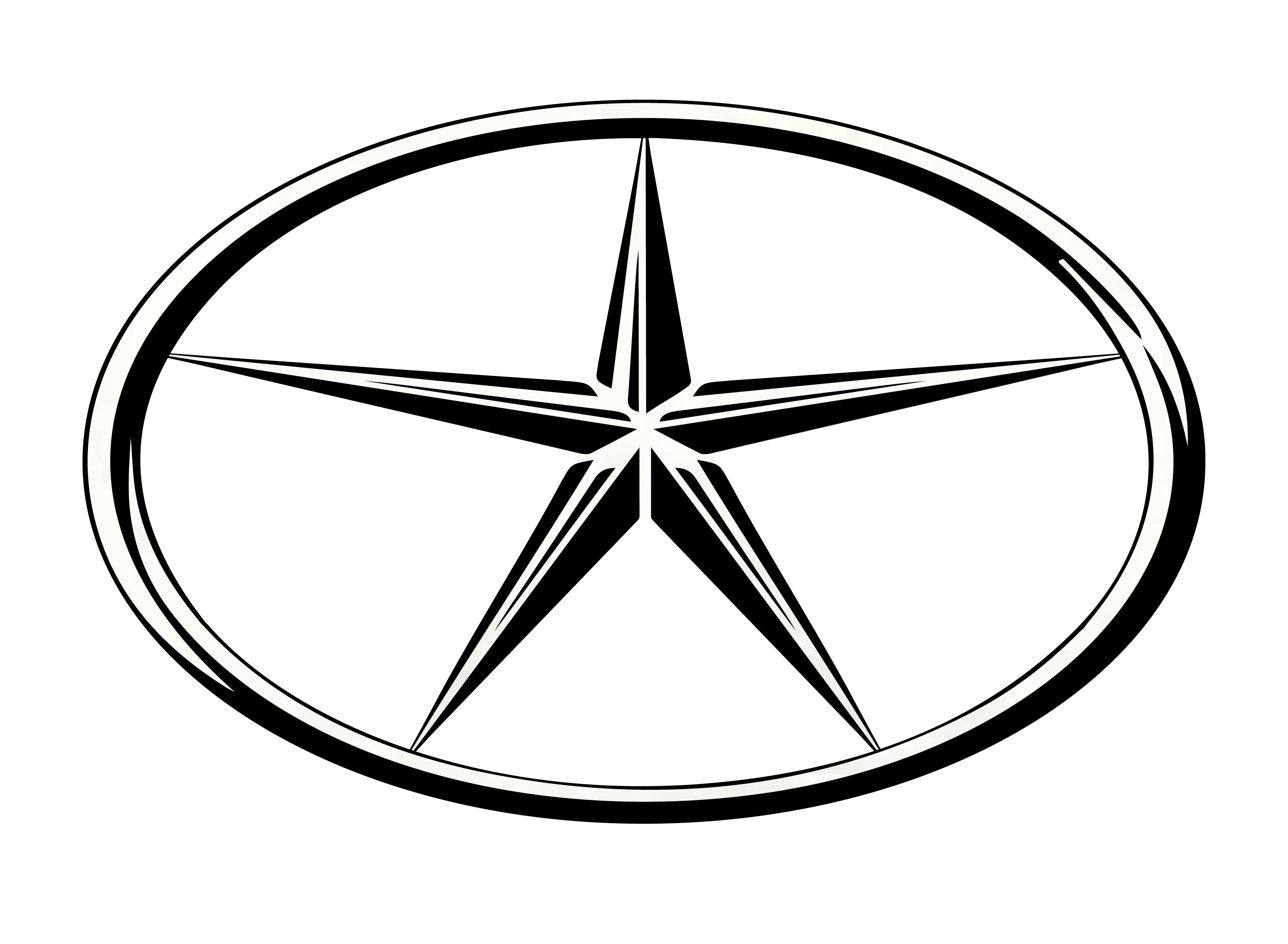
JAC logo (2008–2016)

== Operations ==
A 40,000 unit/year medium-to-heavy truck production base should become operation in 2012 and is probably located in Hefei. (Note: Production capacity figures may consider engines and vehicles as discrete.)

=== Research and development ===
A research and development (R&D) facility in Hefei is complemented by three overseas R&D centres in Turin, Tokyo, and Seoul.

=== Joint ventures ===
==== JAC-Navistar Diesel Engine Company (JND) ====
JAC announced a pair of joint ventures with Navistar International Corporation, NC2 Global (Navistar/Caterpillar joint venture). The NC2 joint venture will manufacture heavy duty trucks. The Navistar joint venture, called JAC-Navistar Diesel Engine Company (JND), will build medium to heavy diesel engines in China with parts and services provisioned by Navistar. The new companies will both be located in Hefei where JAC is also based. Cummins purchased Navistar's equity in the engine joint venture in 2018.

==== JAC-Volkswagen (Sehol) ====
Sehol (Chinese: 思皓; Sihao) is a car brand launched on April 24, 2018, by SEAT and JAC Volkswagen Automotive Co., Ltd. joint venture.

=== Leadership ===
- Zuo Yan'an (1990–2012)
- An Jin (2012–2021)
- Xiang Xingchu (2021–present)

== Sales ==
JAC Motor sales data
Year	Sales
2010	442,547
2011	466,459
2012	448,813
2013	495,737
2014	446,802
2015	588,052
2016	643,342
2017	510,892
2018	462,477
2019	421,241
2020	456,125
2021	524,224
2022	500,401
2023	592,499
2024	403,094
2025	384,071

=== Sales outside China ===
JAC began the export of vehicles to Bolivia in 1990, later expanding to over one hundred countries. Light trucks are a popular export product.

Some JAC exports are in the form of knock-down kits, which are assembled at overseas factories in countries including Egypt, Ethiopia, Vietnam, Mexico and Iran. As of 2010, a possible factory in Slovakia is under discussion. Such factories are not necessarily owned by or affiliated with JAC. Knock-down exports are an easy way to gain access to developing markets without added after-sales service costs.

In 2009, JAC started a partnership with a distributor in Brazil, the SHC group. As of early 2011, it had more than 10,000 firm orders from its Brazilian partner. JAC also had plans to build a production base in the country as of 2009. This plan remained active until at least 2011, at which time the plant was to be located in Bahia state and built in cooperation with the SHC group, which was to provide 80% of the initial investment.

In 2016, JAC entered the Philippines market through a local partner, selling heavy-duty trucks, and in 2018, passenger cars.

In 2017, JAC announced a joint venture in Mexico with Giant Motors, a company owned by tycoon Carlos Slim. A factory has been built at Ciudad Sahagún, in the State of Hidalgo. With a surface of 65,000 square meters, has two lines of production with a capacity of over 25,000 units per year. Since early June 2017, two models are sold in Mexican market: SEI2 and SEI3, both SUVs are made in Mexico in this facility, the compact sedan J4 was added to the line-up in 2018.

== See also ==
- Automobile manufacturers and brands of China
- List of automobile manufacturers of China
- Automotive industry in China
