= List of JAC Group vehicles =

Anhui Jianghuai Automobile Group (JAC Group) is a Chinese car and commercial truck-maker.

== Maextro ==
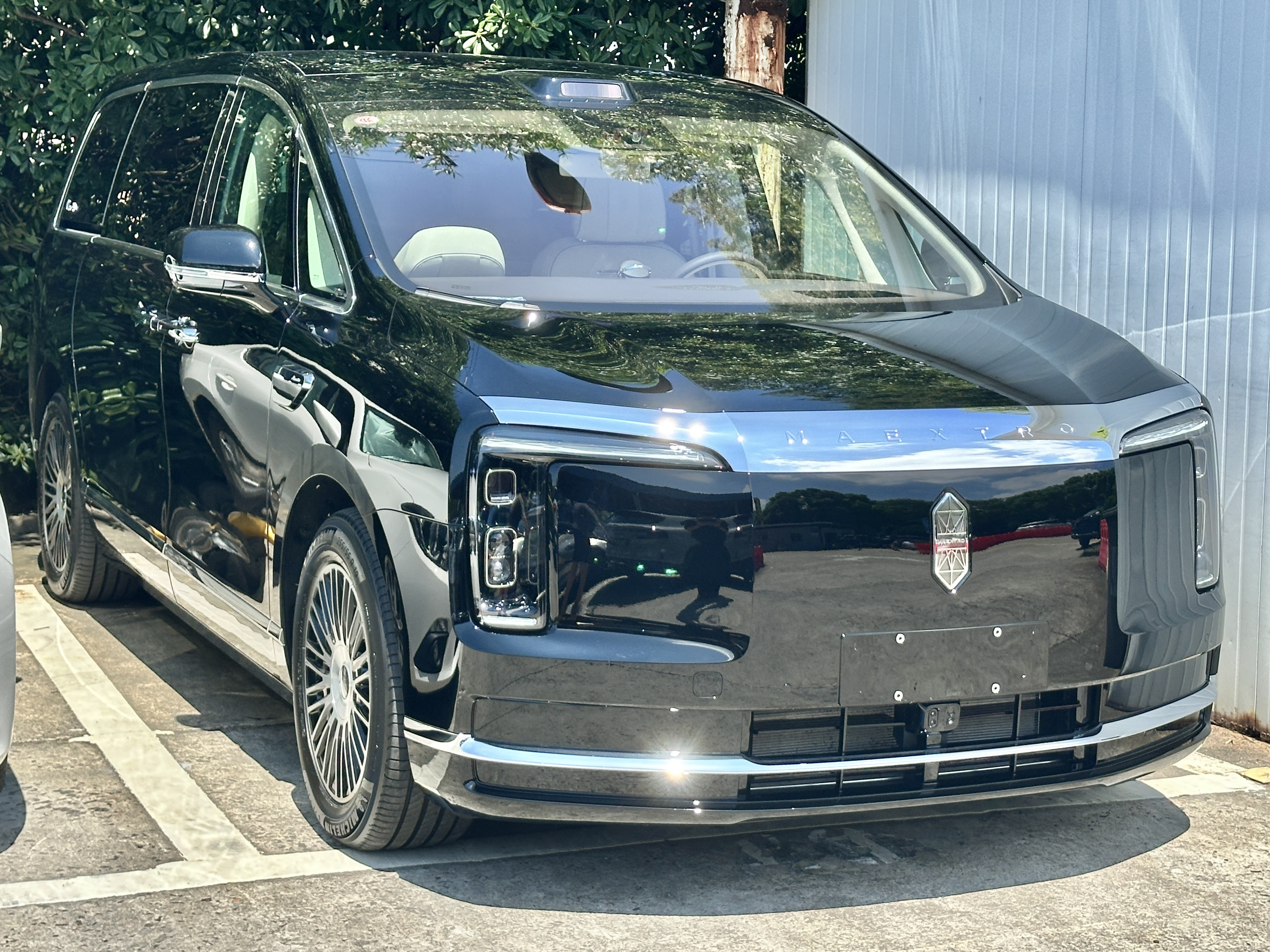
Maextro V680

- Maextro S800
- Maextro V800/V680

== JAC Motors ==
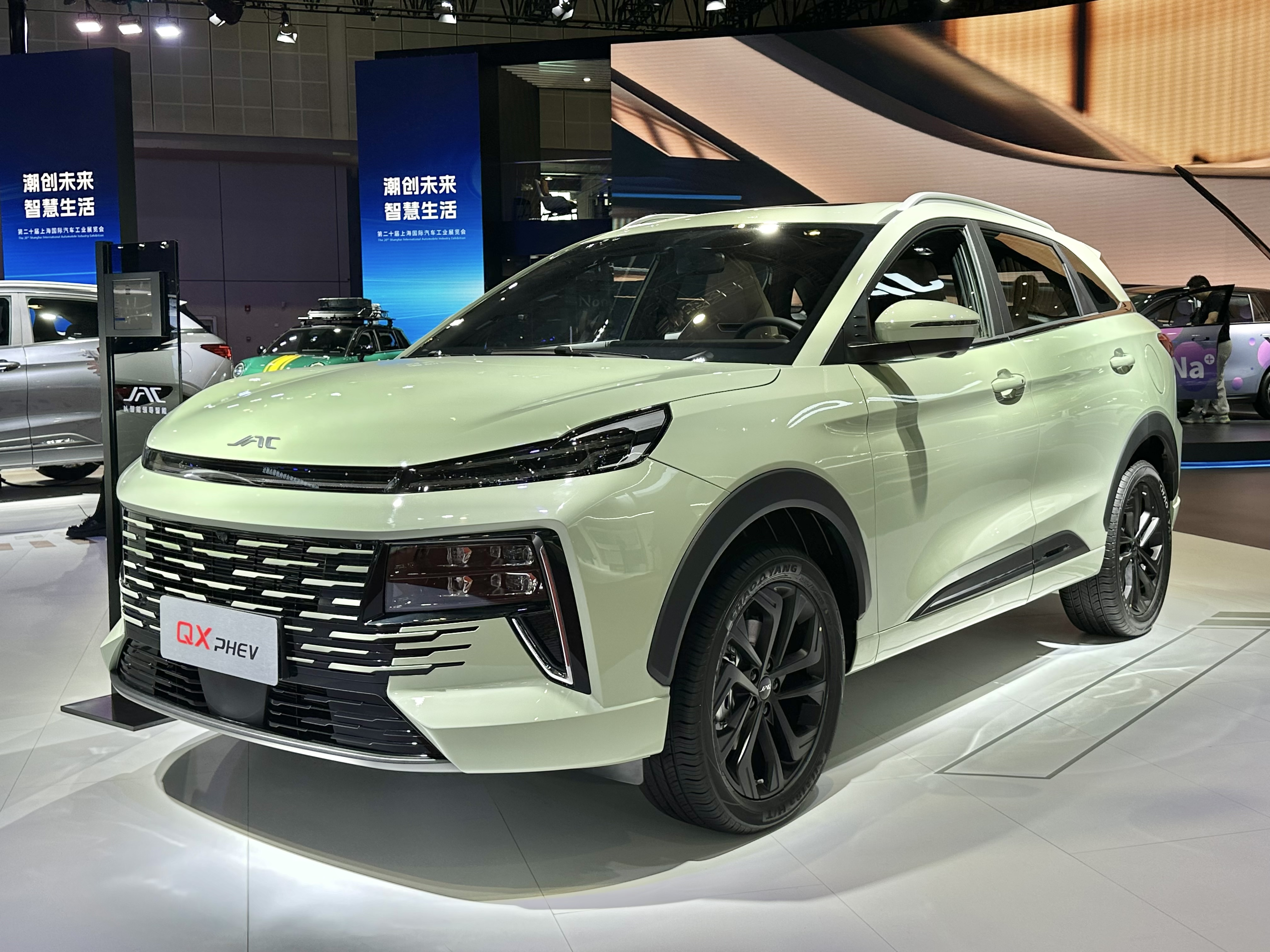
JAC QX

- JAC A5 Plus
- JAC X8
- JAC QX

== JAC Refine ==
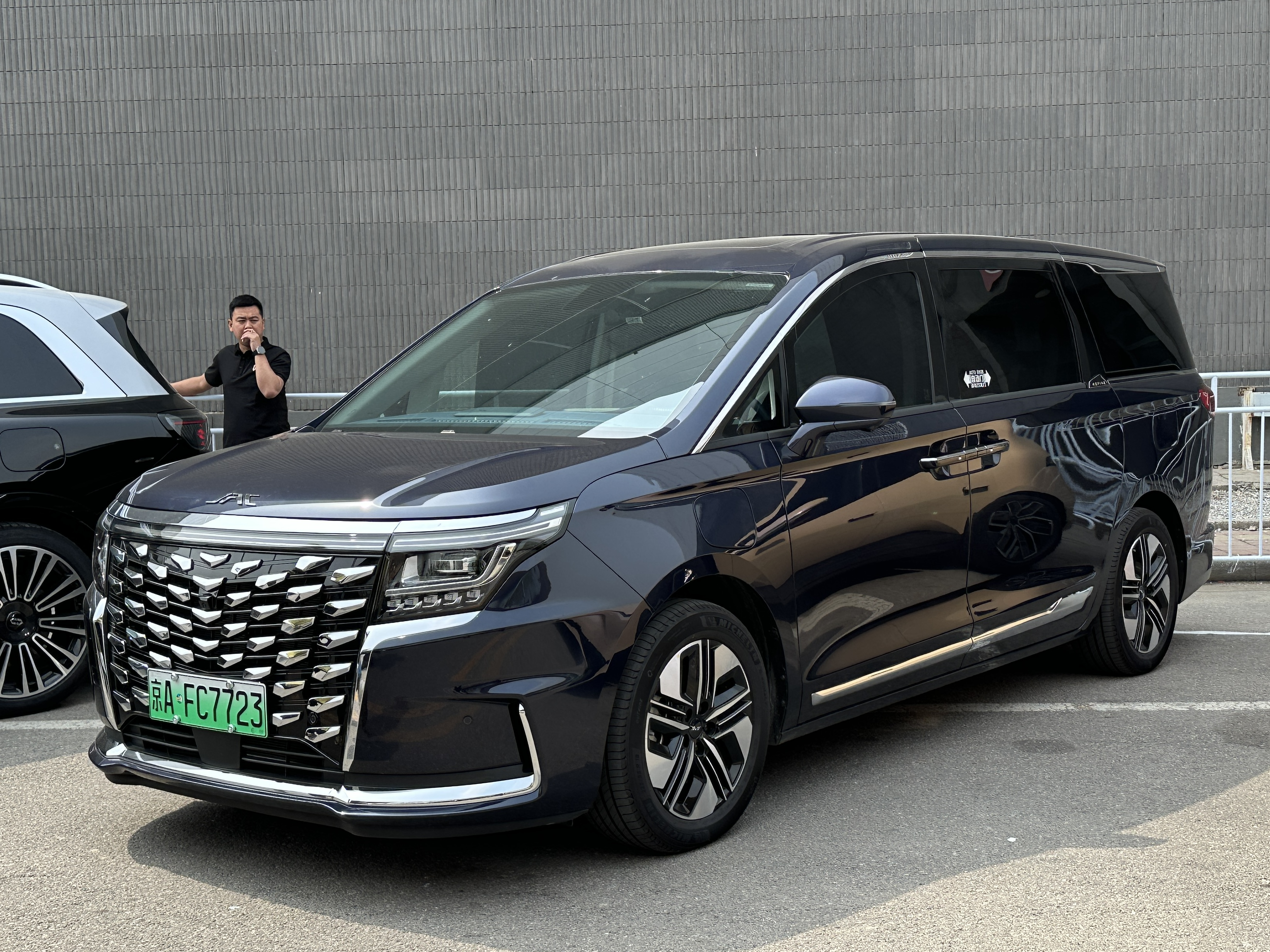
JAC Refine RF8

A sub-brand of JAC that produces passenger vehicles mainly MPVs.

- JAC Refine RF8
- Refine M6
- Refine M5 (Refine II, M2) (2.0 litre) - restyled in 2004 (Refine Gold, Refine II)
- Refine M4
- Refine M3
- Refine M2- Previously the Heyue RS or J6 (1.5 and 1.8 litre)
- Refine M1 (2.0, 2.4 and 2.8 litre) (Discontinued)

== JAC Yiwei ==
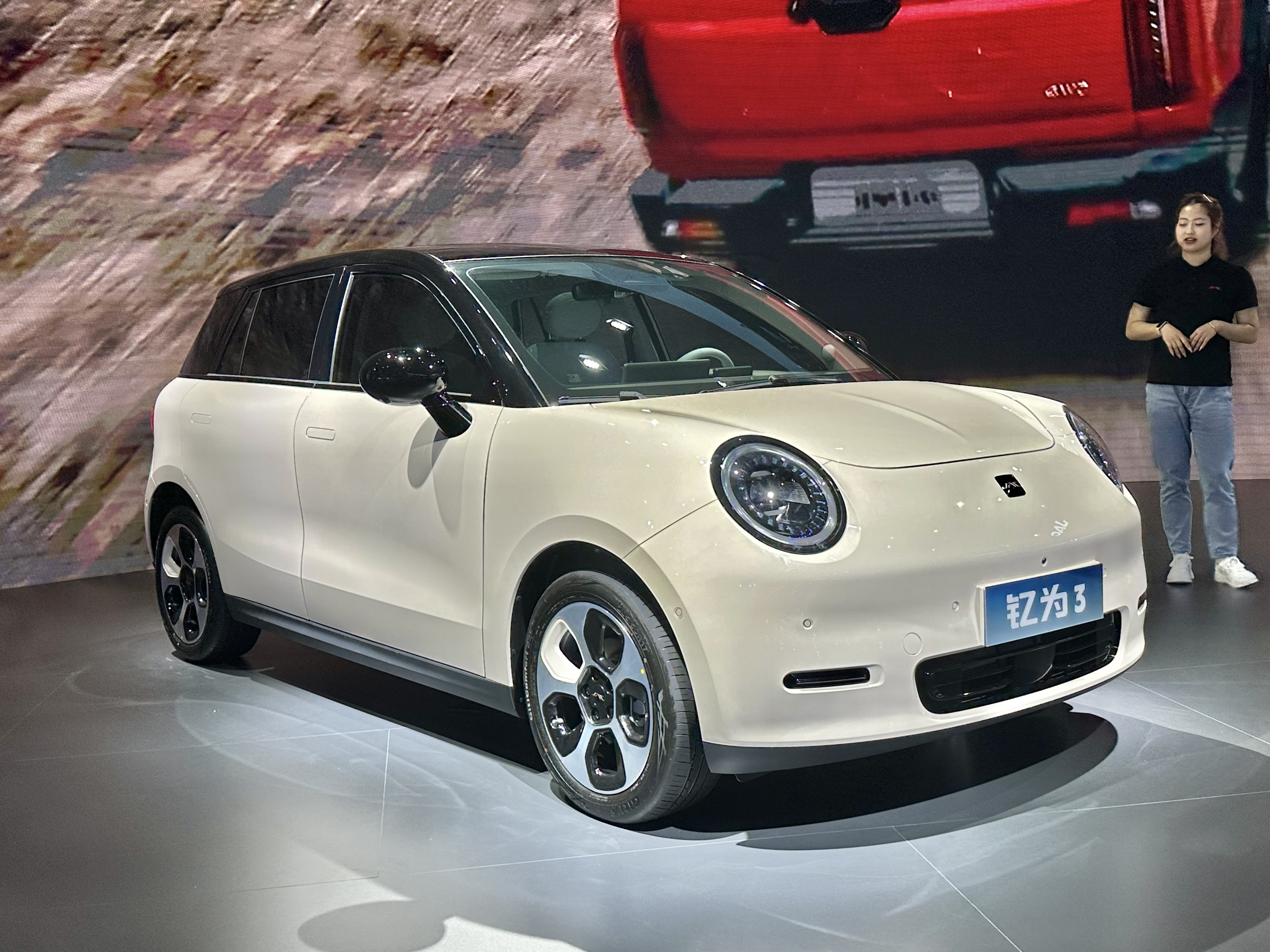
JAC Yiwei 3

- JAC Yiwei 3
- JAC Yiwei Hua Xian Zi
- JAC Yiwei Aipao

== Sehol ==
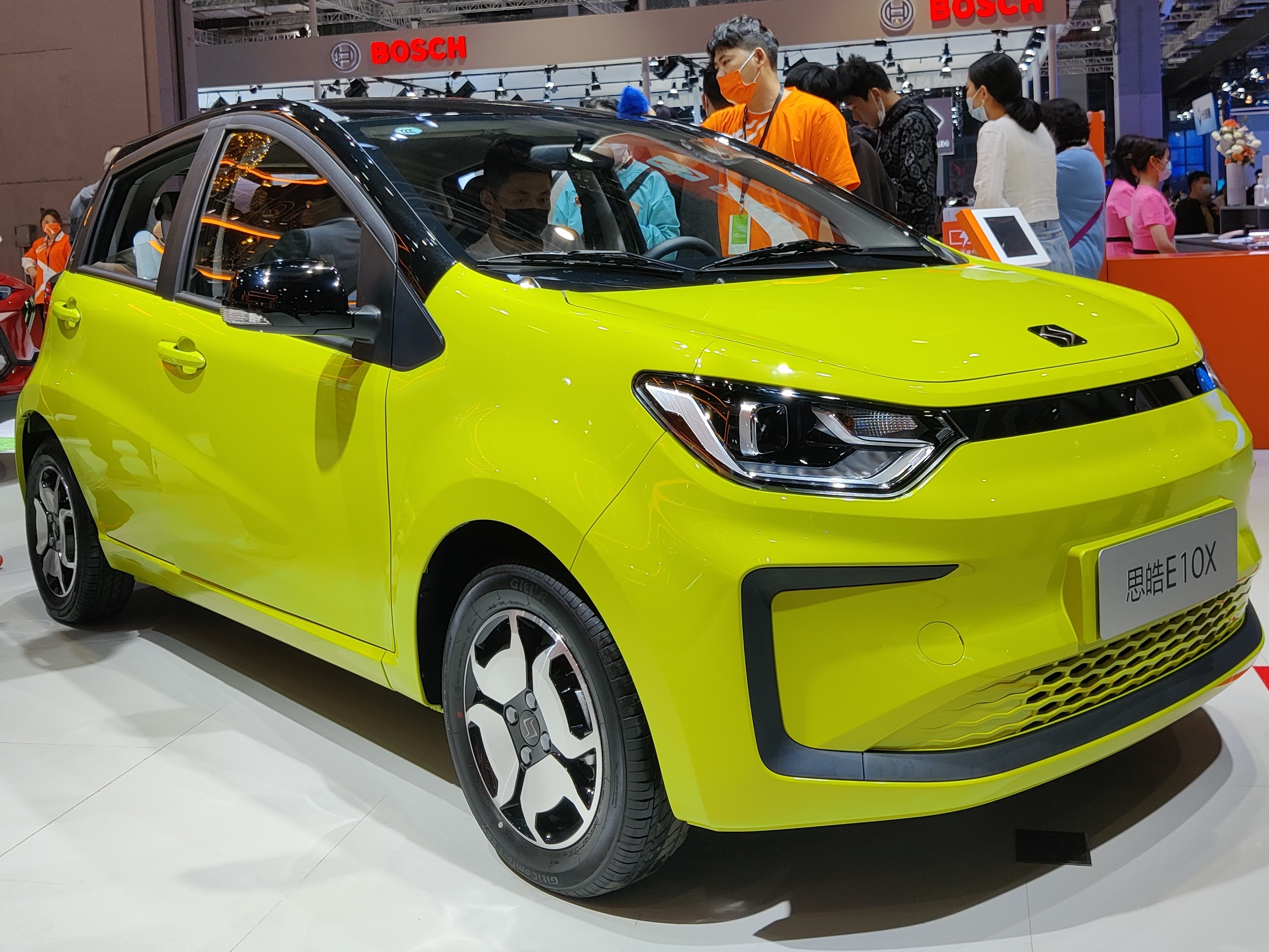
Sehol E10X

- Sehol E10X
- Sehol A5
- Sehol E50A
- Sehol E50A Pro
- Sehol X4
- Sehol E40X
- Sehol X6
- Sehol X7

== Heyue ==
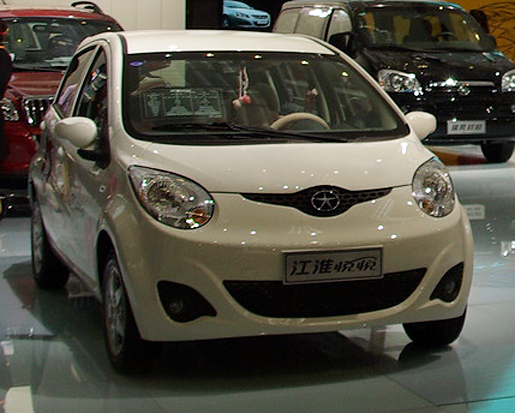
JAC Yueyue

A series of models of JAC that produces sedans and hatchbacks.

- Heyue sedan- also known as J5 or B15 (1.5 and 1.8 litre)
- Heyue A30 (1.5 litre)- also known as J3 Tongyuesedan (aka "J3 Turin"), (the production of the electric vehicle version has started). hatchback (aka "J3")
- Heyue A13
- Yueyue- also known as J2 (1.0 litre) (HFC 7100W and HFC 7100WT) (now called J2) AKA Yueyue supermini

== JAC iEV ==
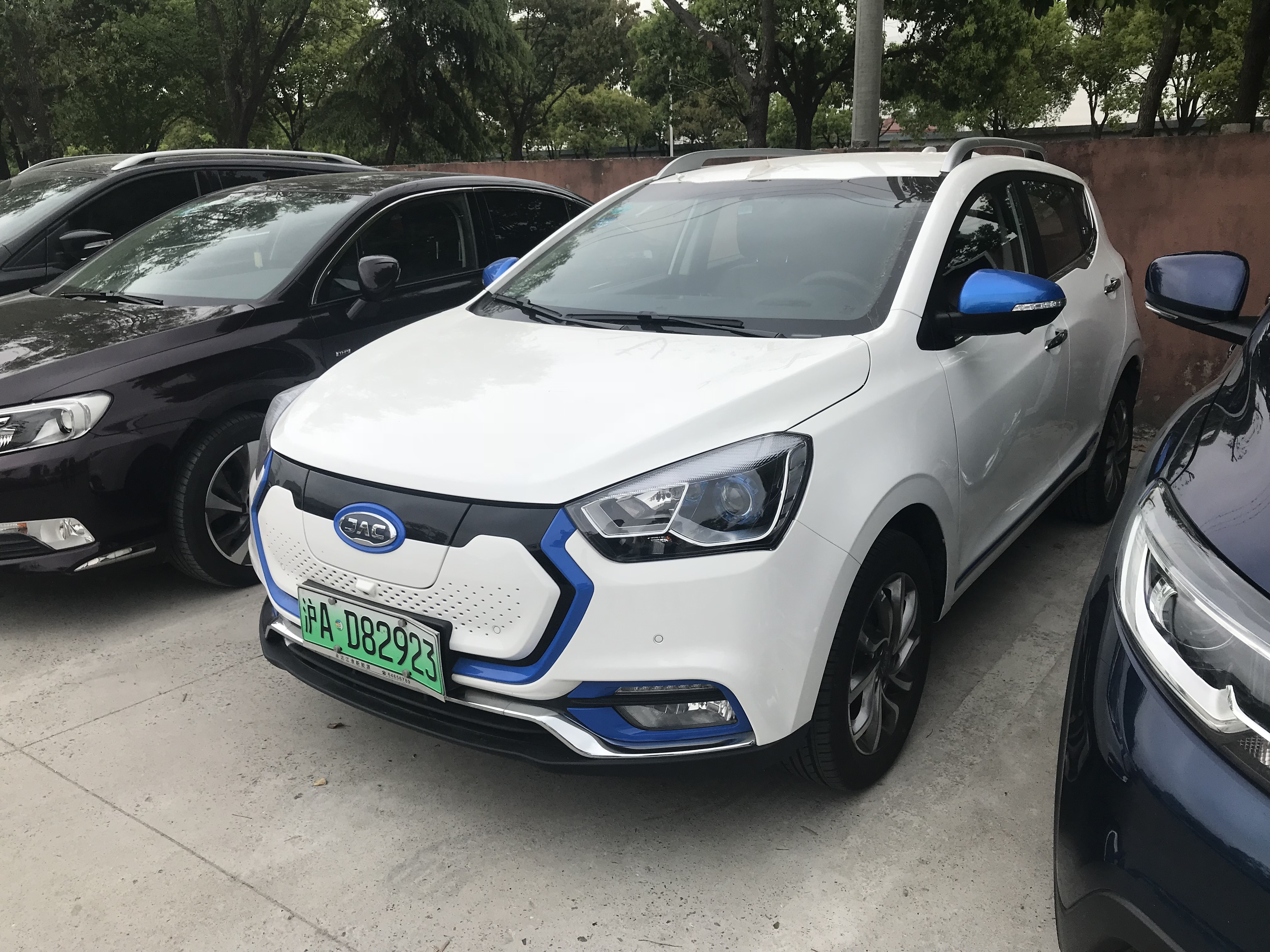
JAC iEV7S

A sub-brand of JAC that produces electric vehicles and new energy vehicles.

- iEV4- Electric sedan based on the Heyue A13
- iEV6E- Electric hatchback based on the Heyue Yueyue
- iEV7- Electric sedan based on the Heyue A30
- iEV7S- Electric crossover based on the Refine S2
- iEVA50- Electric sedan based on the Heyue sedan

=== Light trucks and pickups ===
- Shuailing (帅铃)
  - Shuailing H series
  - Shuailing W series
  - Shuailing K series
  - Shuailing X series
  - Shuailing T6
  - Shuailing T8
  - Shuailing i series
  - Shuailing G series
- Junling (骏铃)
  - Junling E series
  - Junling V series
  - Junling G series
- HY(康铃)
  - K series
  - H series
  - X series
  - G series
- HFC1020KW1
- HFC1027K1R
- 4R3
- HFC1020K
- HFC1040K/KR1, HFC1040K
- HFC1045
- HFC1048
- HFC1061
- HFC1063
- HFC1083
- HFC3045K
- Sunray
- Van Baolu

== SRV ==
- Rein (Ruiying)

== Special-purpose vehicles ==
- Ambulance
- Mail Car
- Mobile Food Wagon
- Overhead Working Vehicle
- PepsiCo Bar Cart
- Police Wagon
- Refrigerated Light Truck
- Road-block Removal Truck
- Stage Vehicle
- Tank Truck
- Traffic Control Vehicle
- Wingspan Van
- HFC1083
- HFC3045K
- HFC3072KR1
- HFC1131KR1
- HFC5250GJBL

== Commercial vehicles ==
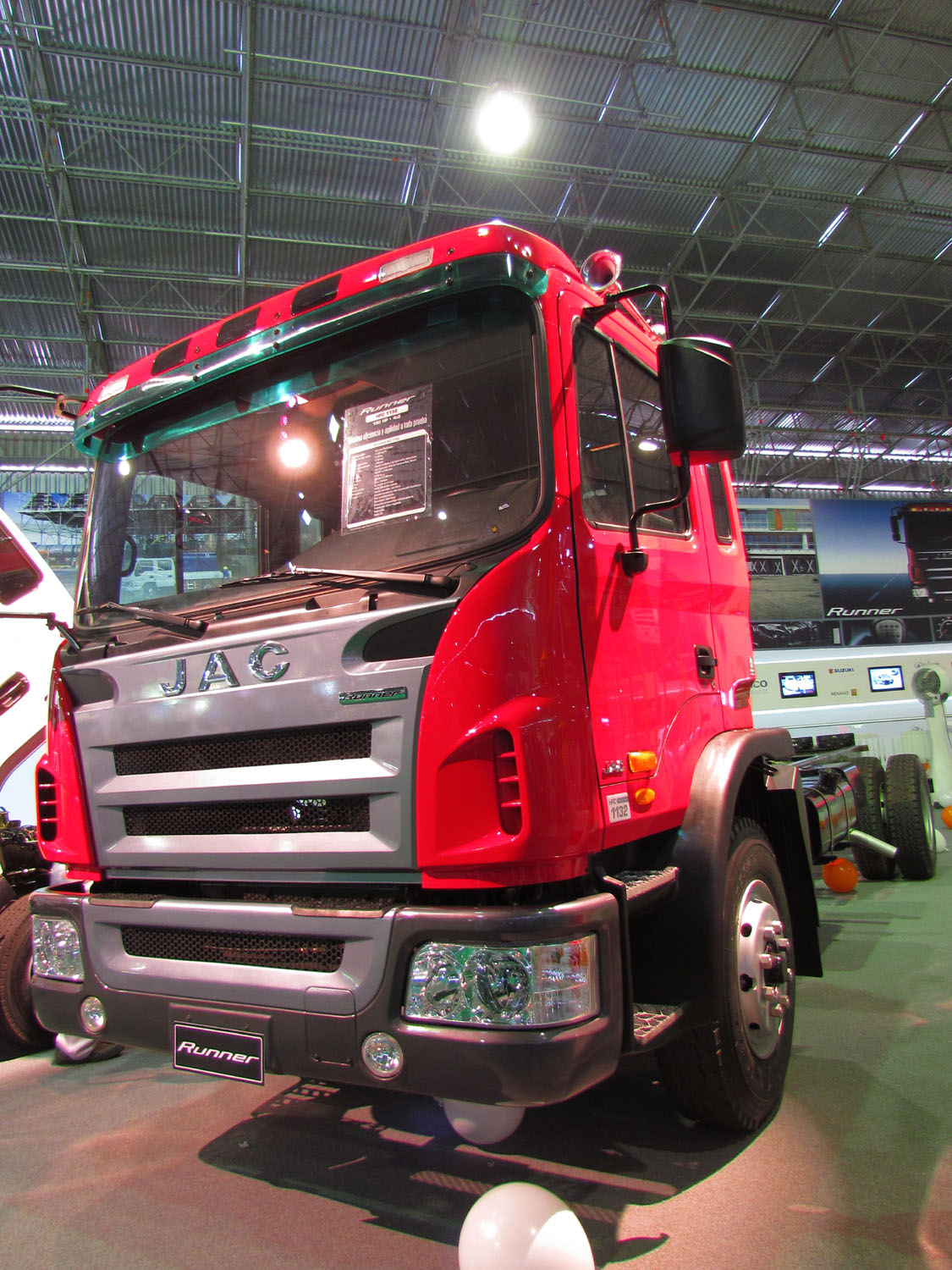
2012 JAC HFC 1132 Runner

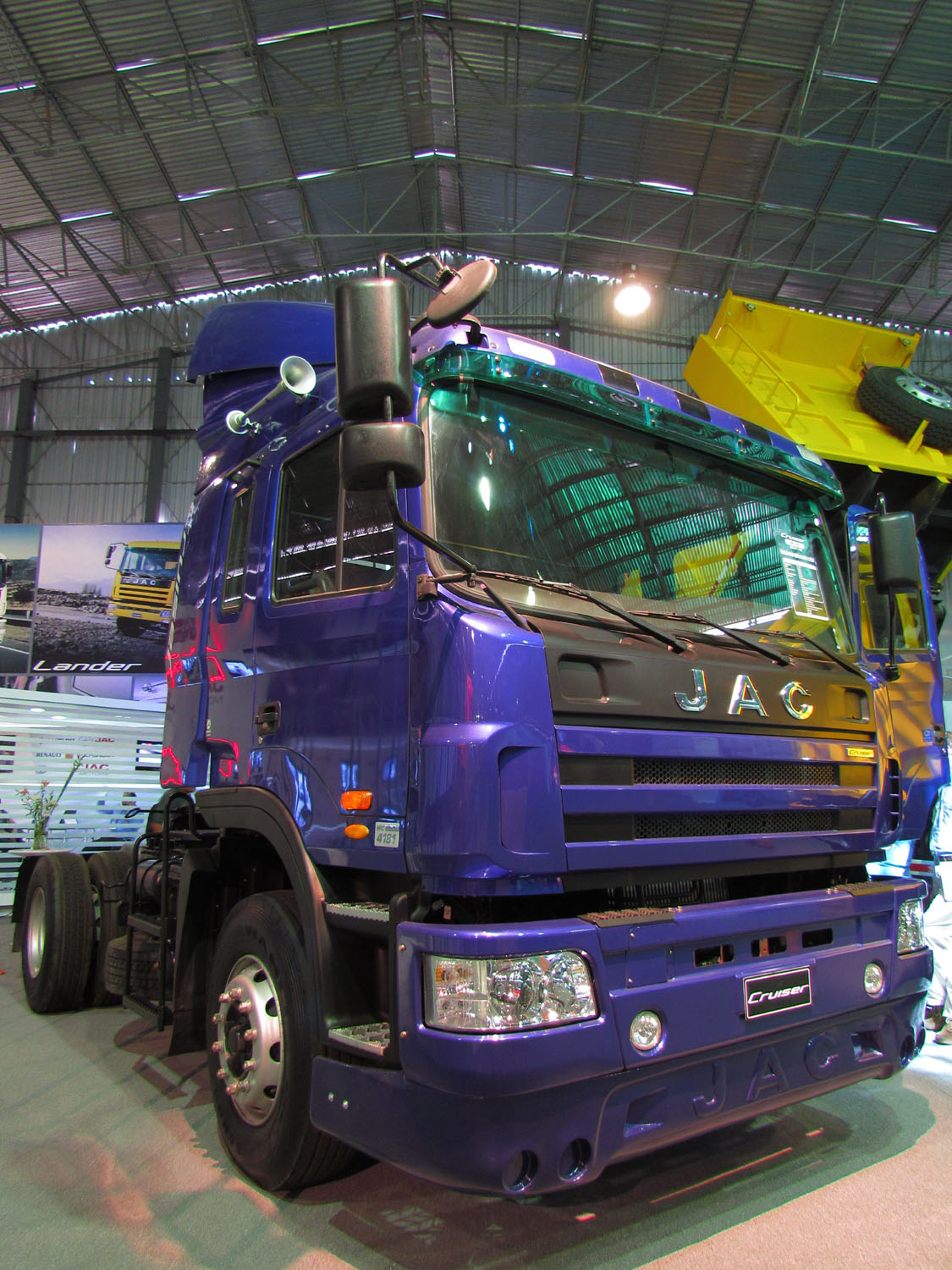
2012 JAC HFC 4181 Cruiser

- Half Height Roof Cab (tilt cab) (HFC 4131KR1/HFC 4183K3R1/HFC 4181KR1K3)
- Dump truck (tilt cab) (HFC 3251KR1/HFC 3251KR1)
- Concrete mixer (tilt cab) (HFC 5250GJBL/HFC 5255GJBLK3/HFC 5310GJBL)
- Large commercial flatbed truck (tilt cab) (HFC 1131KR1/HFC 1131KR1/HFC 1131KR1)
- HFC 1132 Runner - based on Scania R-series truck cab

== Bus chassis ==
- HFC6100KY
- HFC6700K6C
- HFC6700K3Y
- HFC6782KYZL2
- HFC6832KYZL1
- HFC6700KY6C

== Concept Cars ==
- S11 (Hybrid Sports car)
