= Sehol =

Chinese automotive marque by JAC Motors

- Product type: Automotive marque
- Current owner: JAC Motors
- Country: China
- Introduced: 2018
- Discontinued: 2023
- Related brands: SEAT
- Markets: China
- Previous owners: JAC Volkswagen (2018–2020)
- Website: http://www.sol-auto.com.cn/home.html

Sehol (Chinese: 思皓; pinyin: Sī hào) or previously, Sol, was a Chinese car brand launched on April 24, 2018, by a SEAT and JAC Volkswagen Automotive Co., Ltd. joint venture.

== History ==
The original name Sol itself derives from the word sol which in Spanish stands for sun and pays a tribute from one part to the Spanish roots of the brand and on the other part to renewable energy powered vehicles planned to make up its range. The brand comes as a compromise among all parts in a stance where the original plan included the direct use of the SEAT brand name with the Chinese local authorities negating in a change of mind and calling for a whole new local brand to be launched.

Recent lift of caps on foreign car makers controlling their electric vehicle joint ventures in China, however the car company has pushed Volkswagen Group examining a buyout of their Chinese partner JAC Motors and subsequently their formed joint venture.

In 2020, the Volkswagen Group increased its stake in the joint venture, JAC Volkswagen, to 75% and officially renamed Volkswagen Anhui. The Sehol brand has been licensed for use by JAC, essentially making it no longer a joint venture brand.

As of 2020, JAC started to rebadge the JAC products under the Jiayue series as Sol vehicles. Resulted in the Sol A5, Sol X4, Sol X7, and Sol X8. The rebadge is in fact a move to move all sedans and crossovers under the Sol brand and leave the Refine brand with MPVs. As of 2021, this name was re-transliterated as 'Sehol' brand.

In 2023, several Sehol models, like QX, A5 and X8, were rebadged back to JAC brand. JAC revealed that they decided to phase out the Sehol brand in the future.

== Products ==
=== Current models ===
- Sehol E10X (2021–present), city car, based on the restyled version of JAC iEV6E.
- Sehol A5, (2019–present), compact sedan, rebadged from Jiayue A5
  - Sehol E50A (2021–present), EV variant of A5
  - Sehol A5 Plus, (2021–present), a sportier variant of the A5
    - Sehol E50A Pro (2022–present), EV variant of A5 Plus
- Sehol X4 (2020–present), compact SUV, rebadged from Jiayue X4, based on the JAC Refine S4.
  - Sehol E40X (2021–present), EV variant of X4
- Sehol X6 (2022–present), compact SUV, based on the JAC Refine S5.
- Sehol X7 (2020–present), mid-size SUV, rebadged from Jiayue X7 based on the JAC Refine S7
- Sehol X8 (2020–present), mid-size SUV
- Sehol QX (2021–present), compact SUV
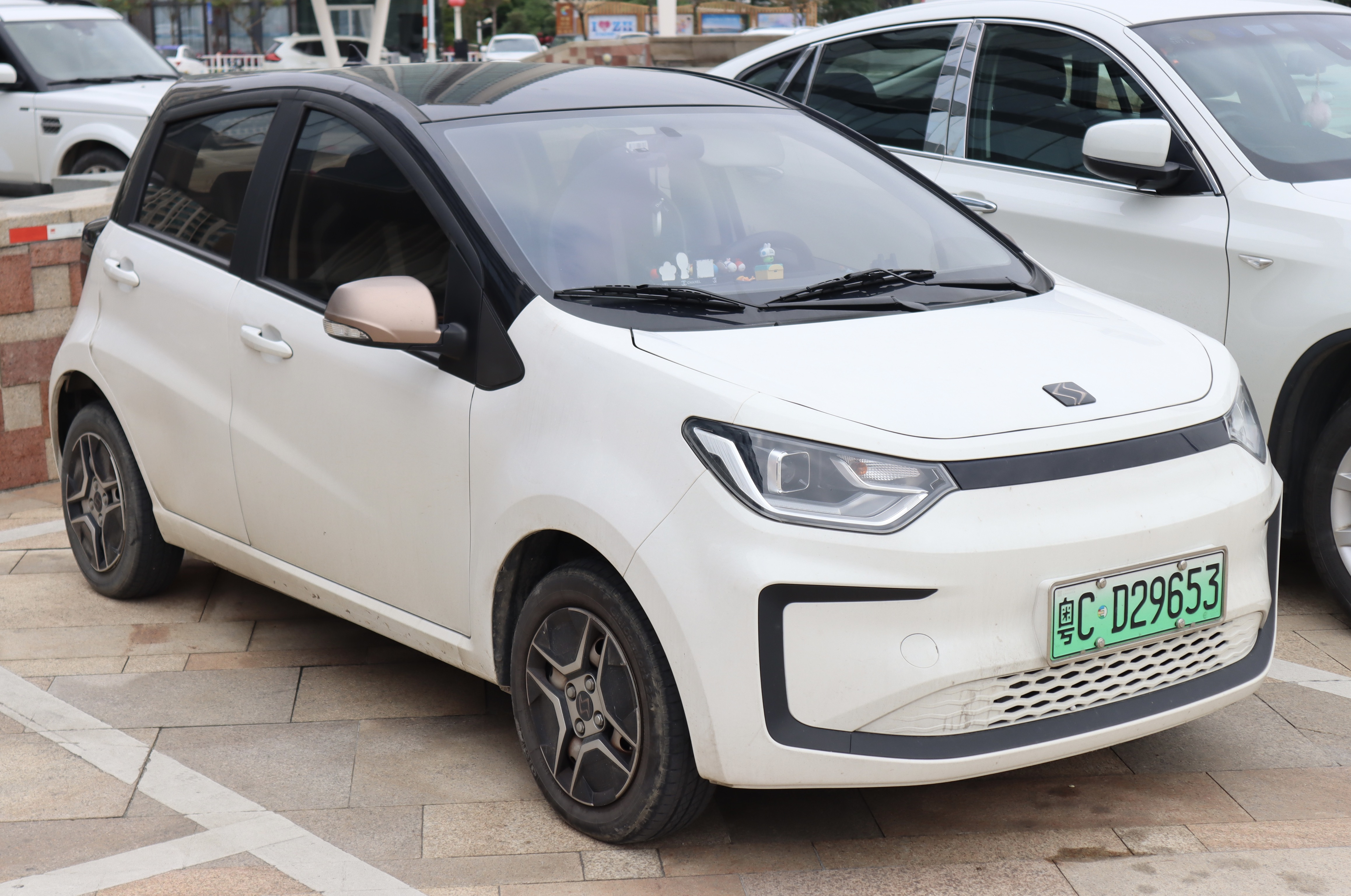
Sehol E10X

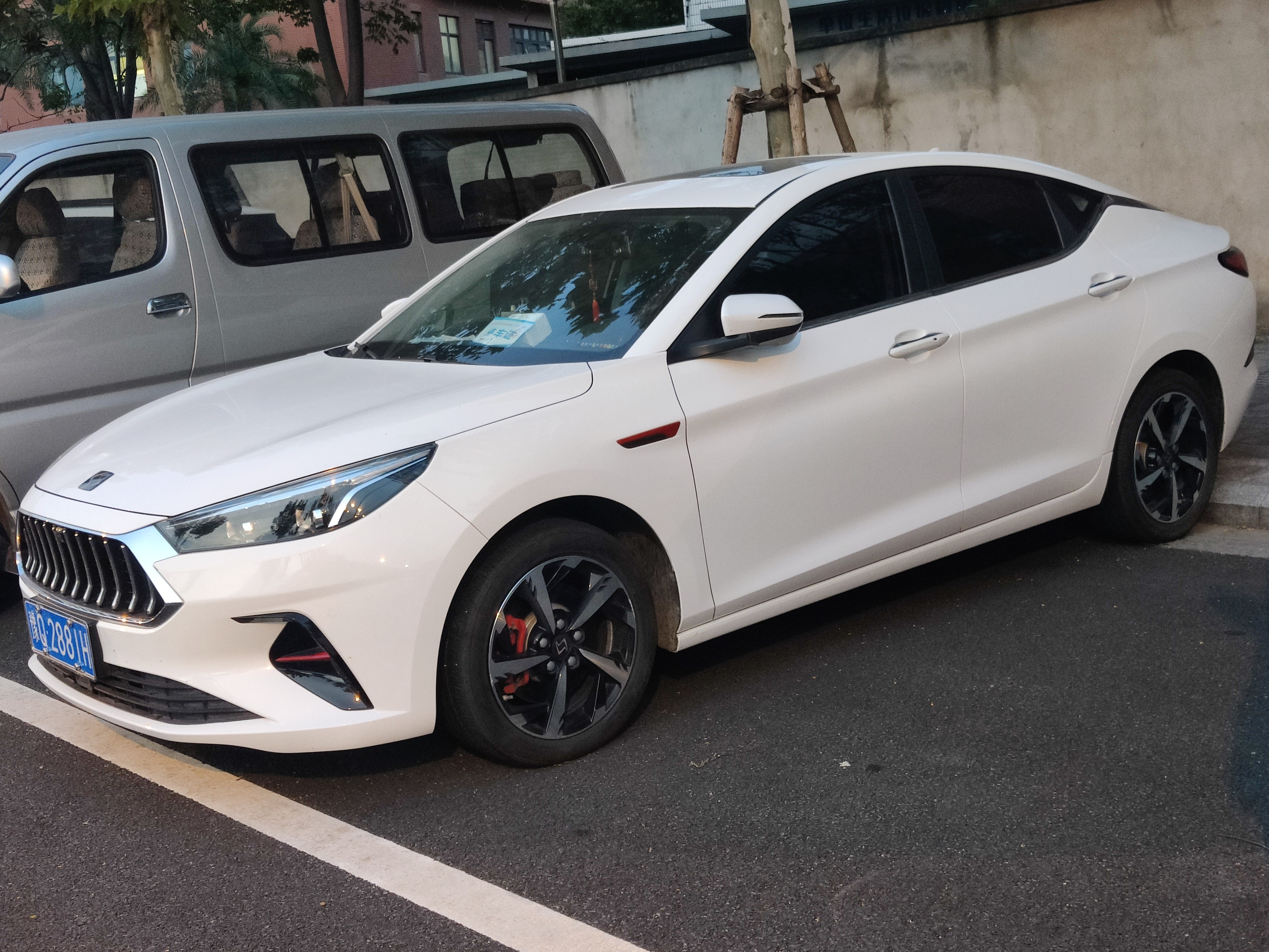
Sehol A5

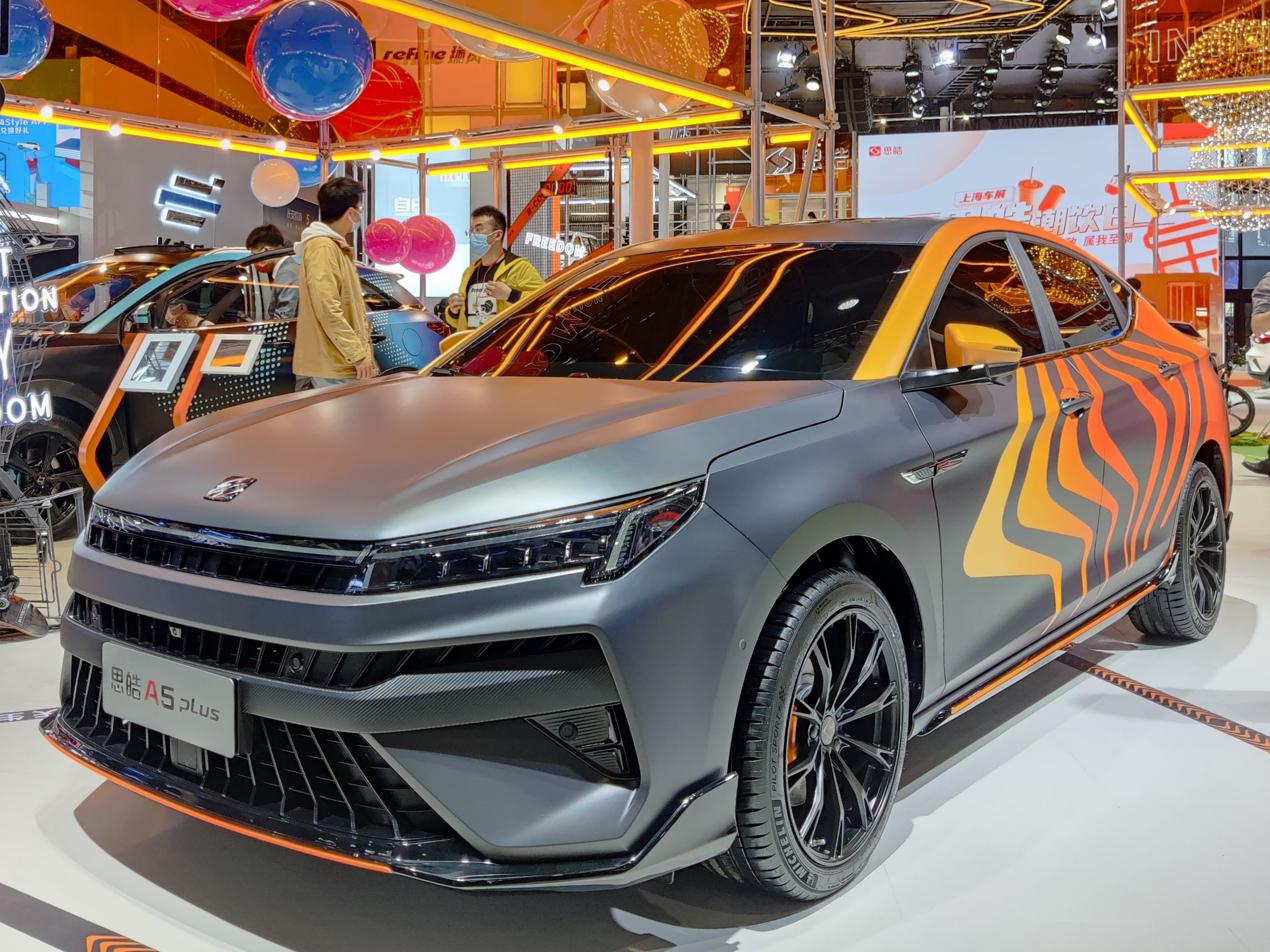
Sehol A5 Plus

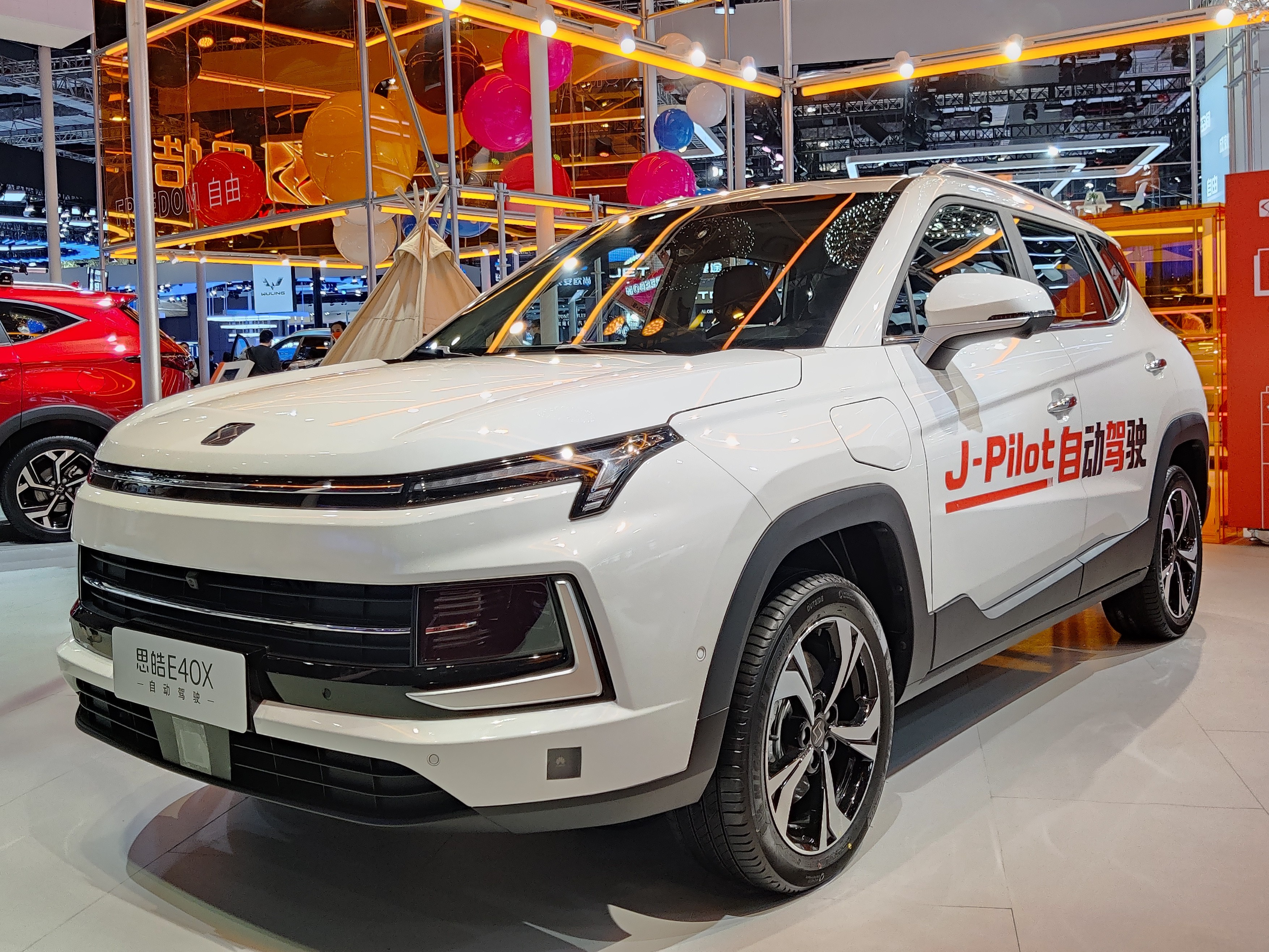
Sehol E40X

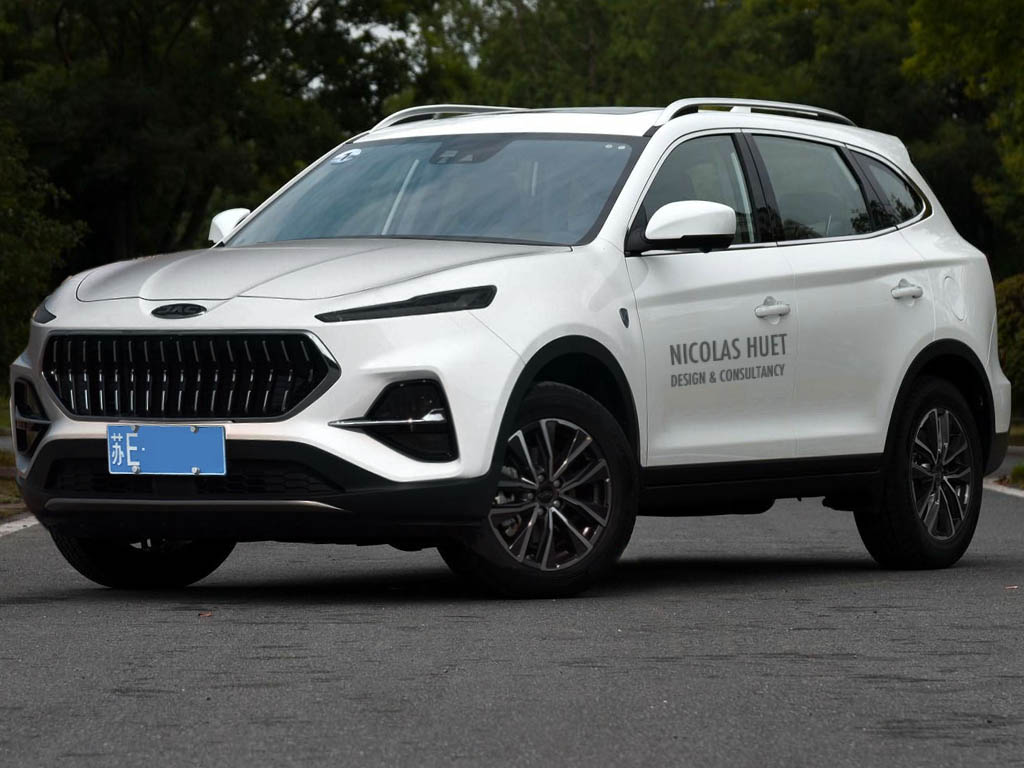
Sehol X7

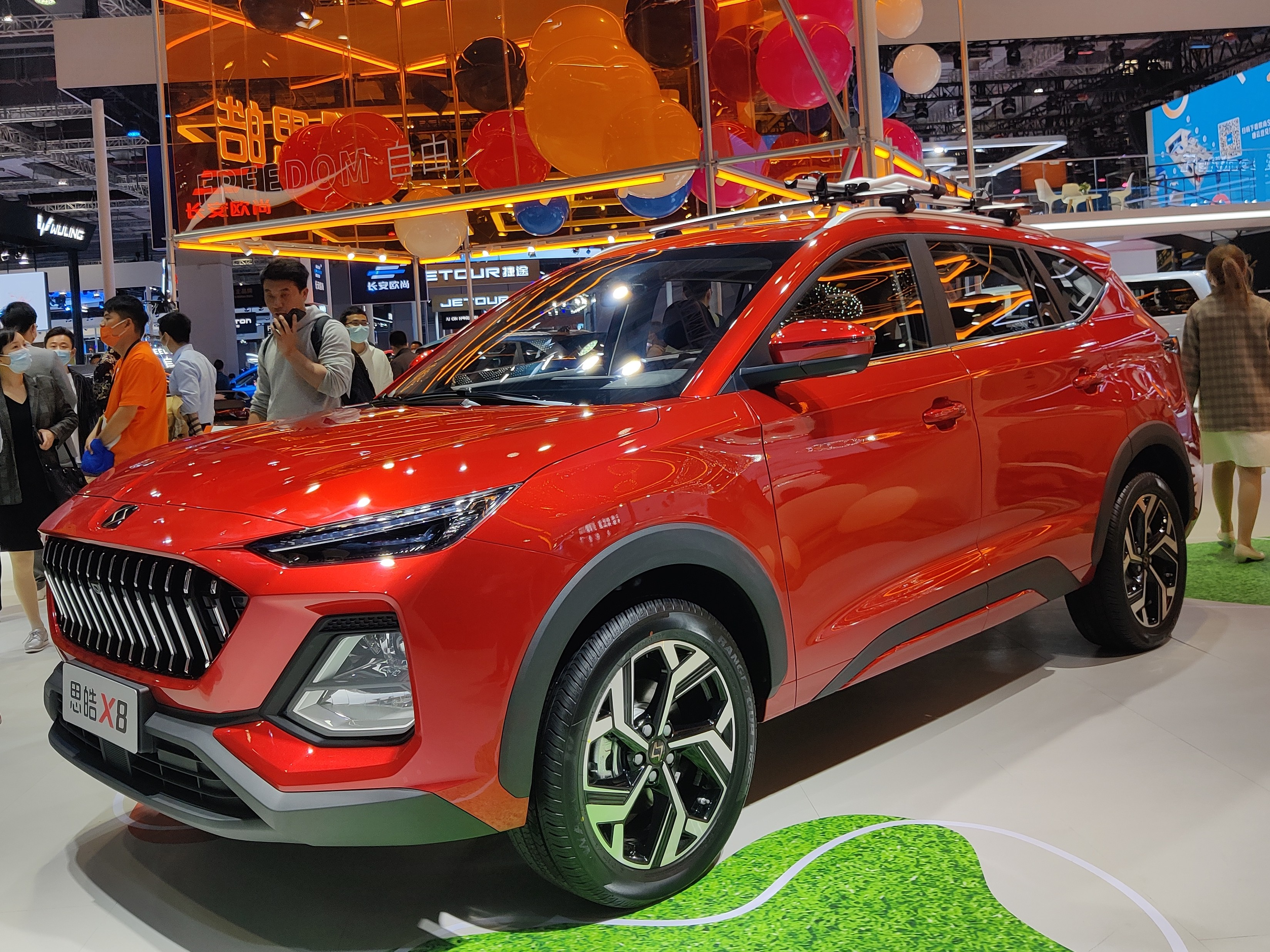
Sehol X8

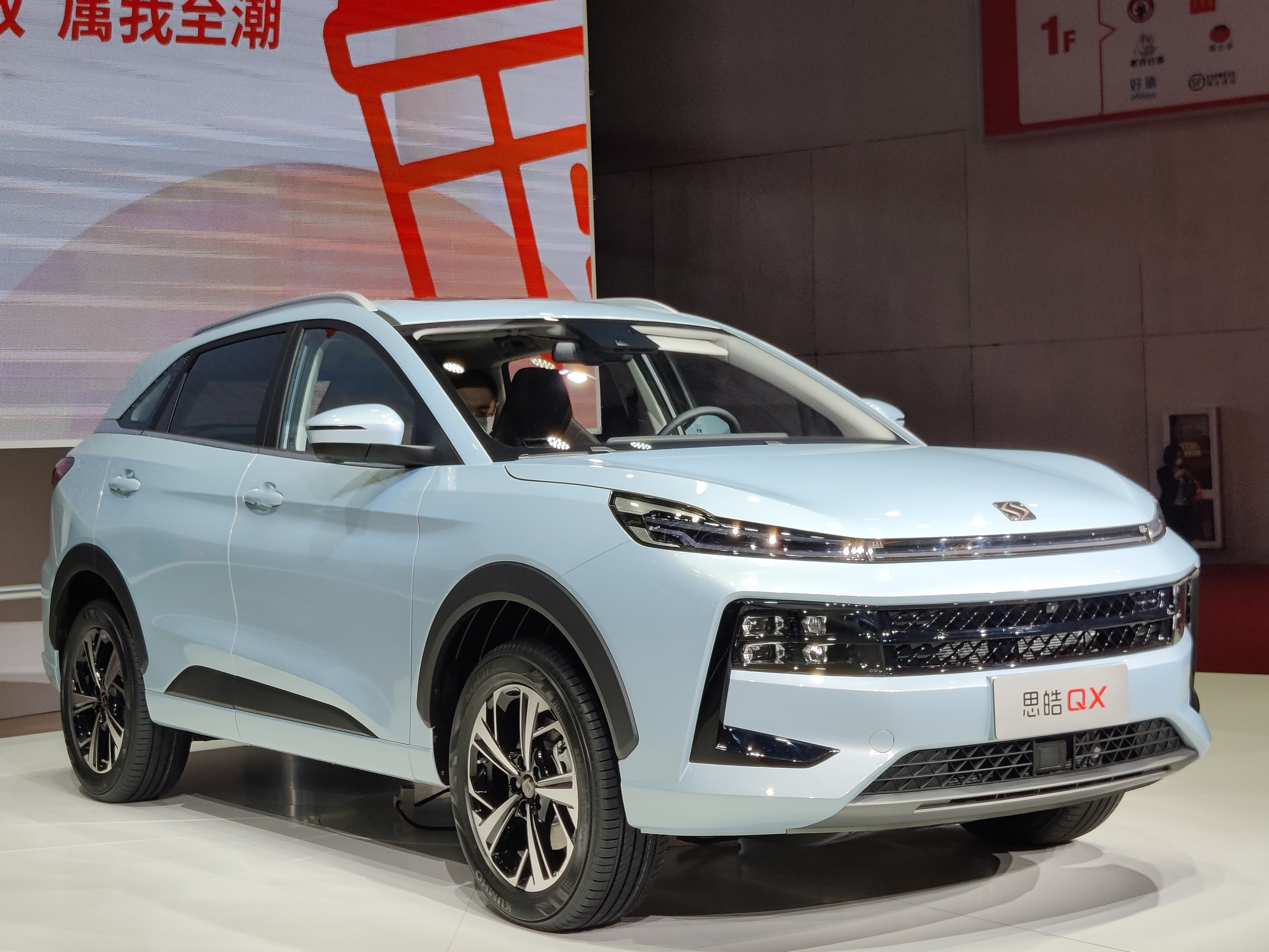
Sehol QX

=== Discontinued models ===
- Sehol E20X (2018–2022), subcompact SUV, based on the JAC Refine S2.
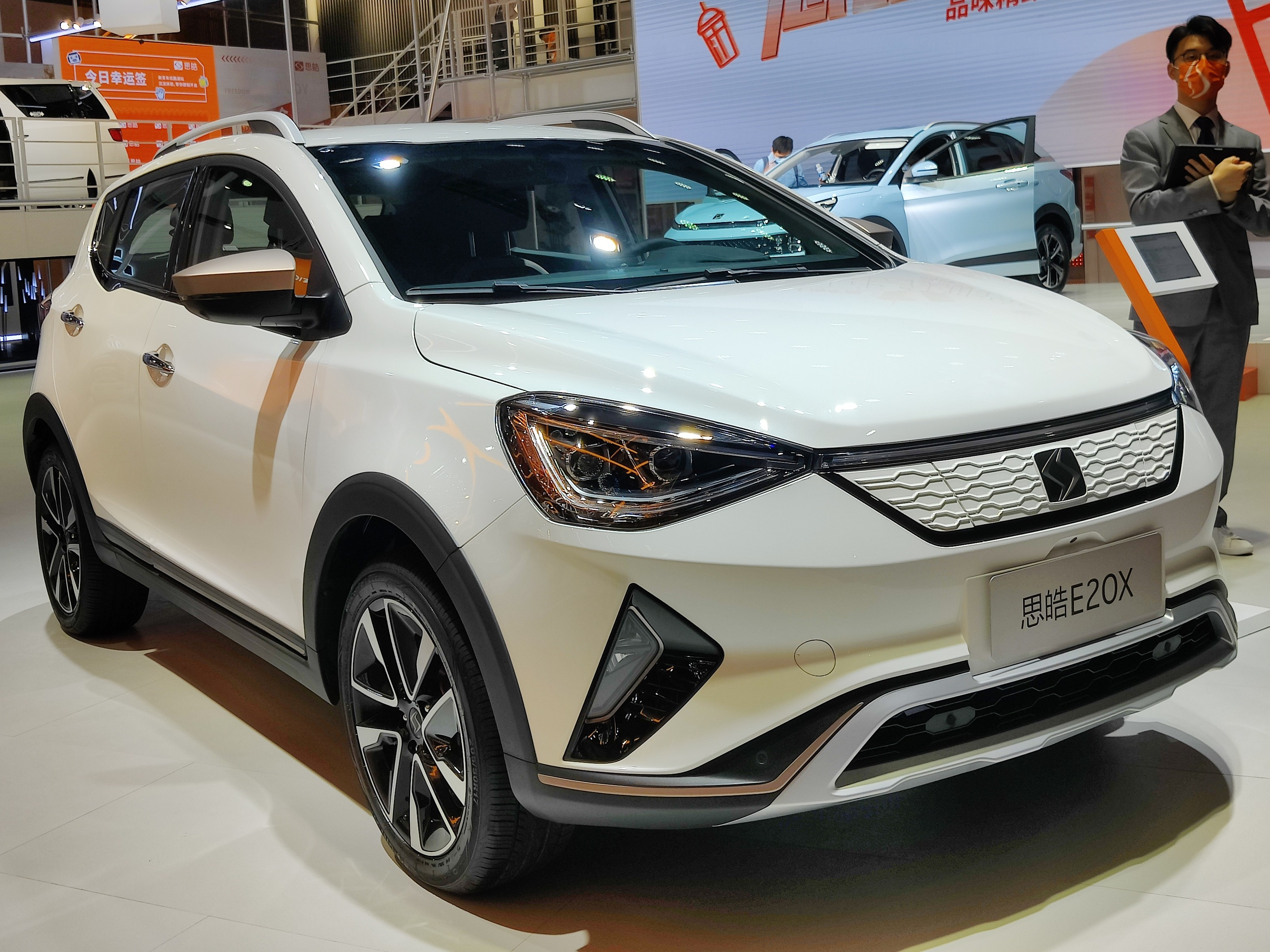
Sehol E20X
