= JAC A5 Plus =

Compact liftback vehicle made by JAC Motors

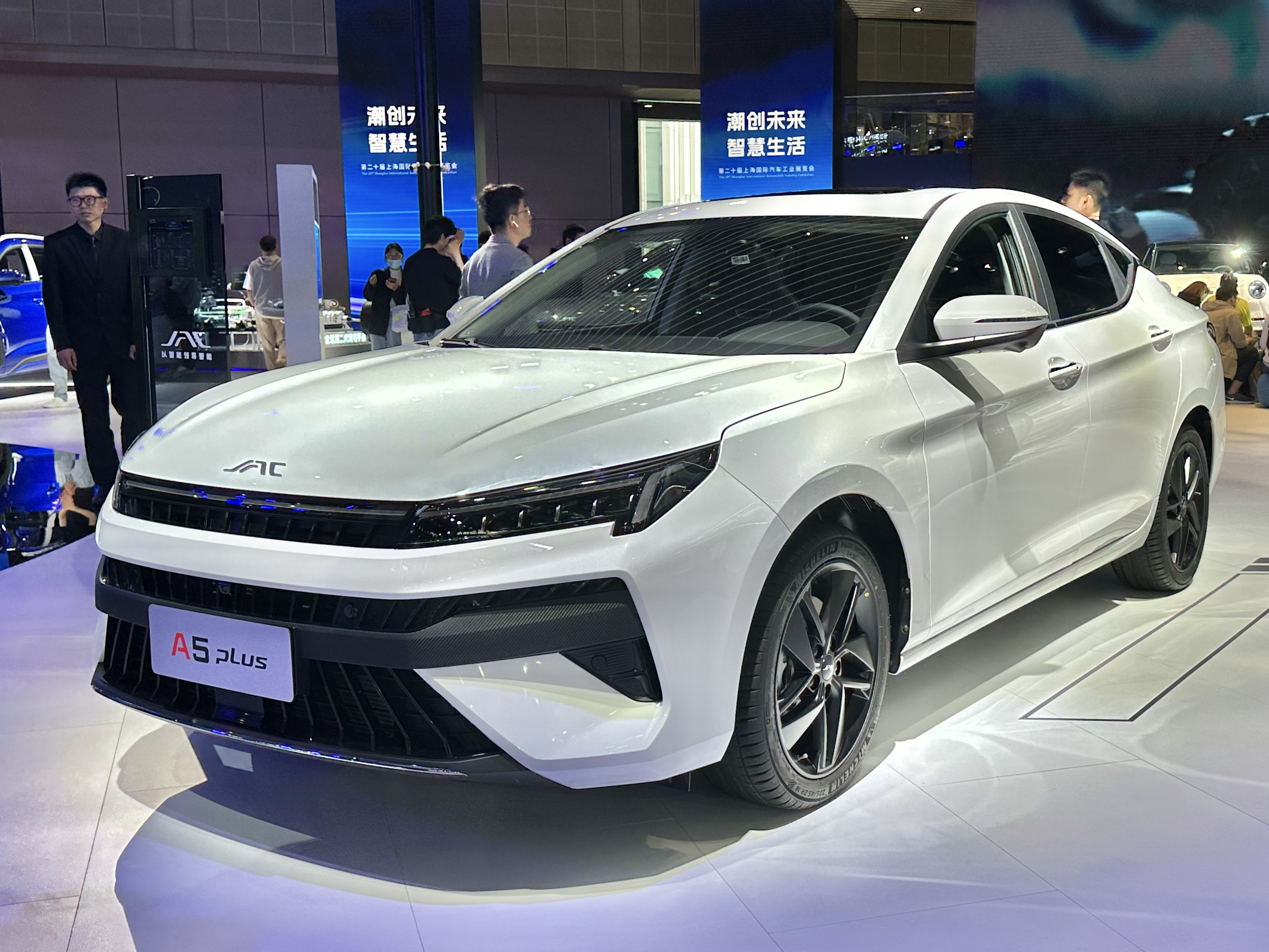

Overview
- Manufacturer: Sehol (JAC Motors)
- Also called: Sol/Sehol Yao; JAC J7 Plus; JAC Yiwei Aipao; KMC J7 (Iran); Moskvitch 6 (Russia)
- Production: 2021–present
- Model years: 2021–present
- Assembly: China: Hefei; Iran: Bam (KMC); Russia: Moscow

Body and chassis
- Class: Compact car (C)
- Body style: 5-door liftback
- Layout: FF layout
- Related: Sehol A5

Powertrain
- Engine: Petrol: 1.5 L HFC4GB2.4E turbo I4
- Electric motor: Permanent magnet synchronous (EV)
- Transmission: 7-speed dual-clutch; 1-speed direct-drive (EV)
- Battery: 64 kWh Li-ion (EV)

Dimensions
- Wheelbase: 2,770 mm (109.1 in)
- Length: 4,780 mm (188.2 in)
- Width: 1,820 mm (71.7 in)
- Height: 1,492 mm (58.7 in)

Chronology
- Predecessor: Sehol A5

The JAC A5 Plus or originally the Sehol A5 Plus is a compact liftback produced by Sehol of JAC Motors.

== Overview ==
The Sehol A5 Plus was revealed during the 2021 Shanghai Auto Show with sales starting in August 2021. It is the first sedan under the Sehol brand. After 2023, the model was rebadged back to JAC.

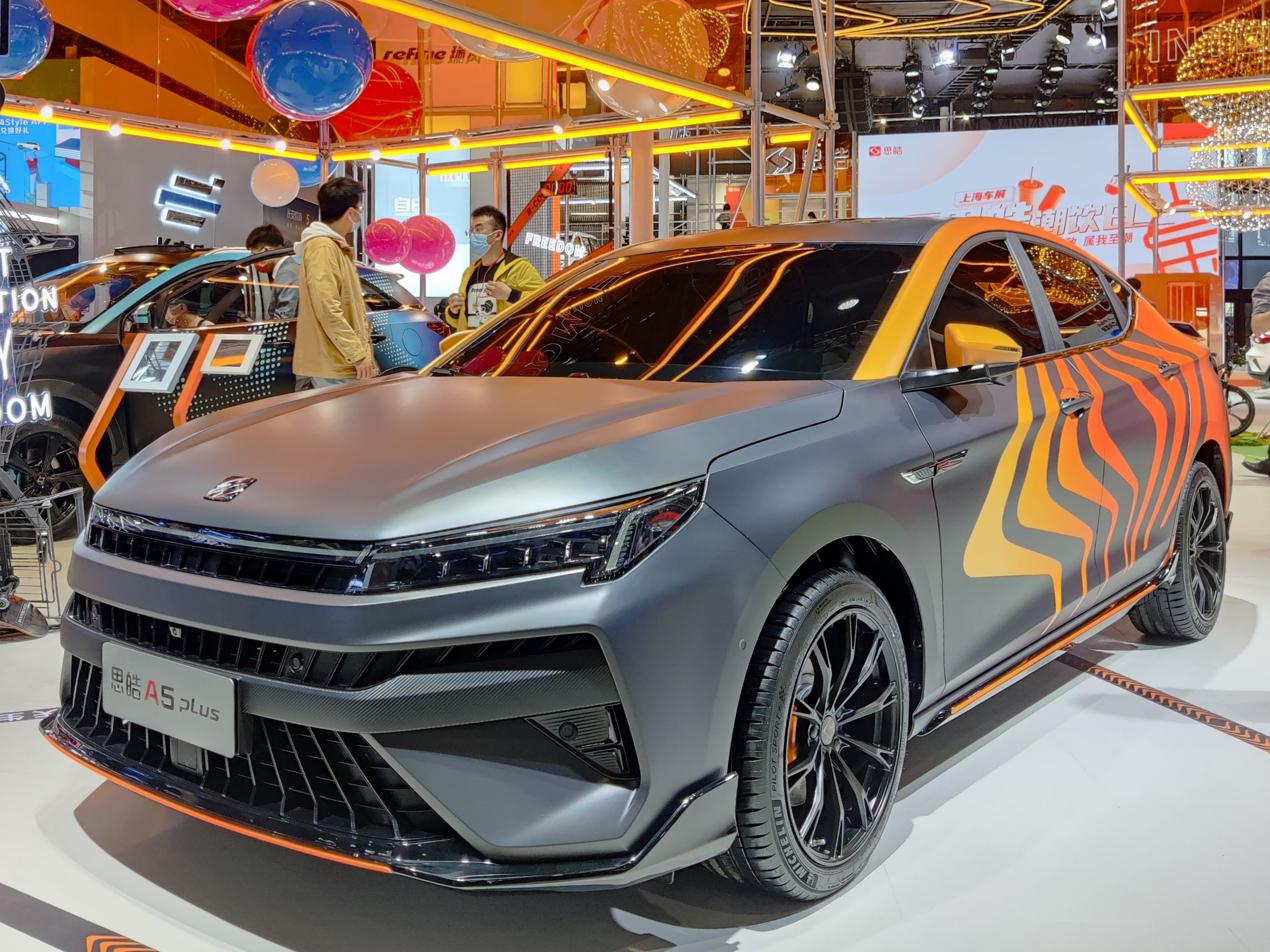
Sehol A5 Plus

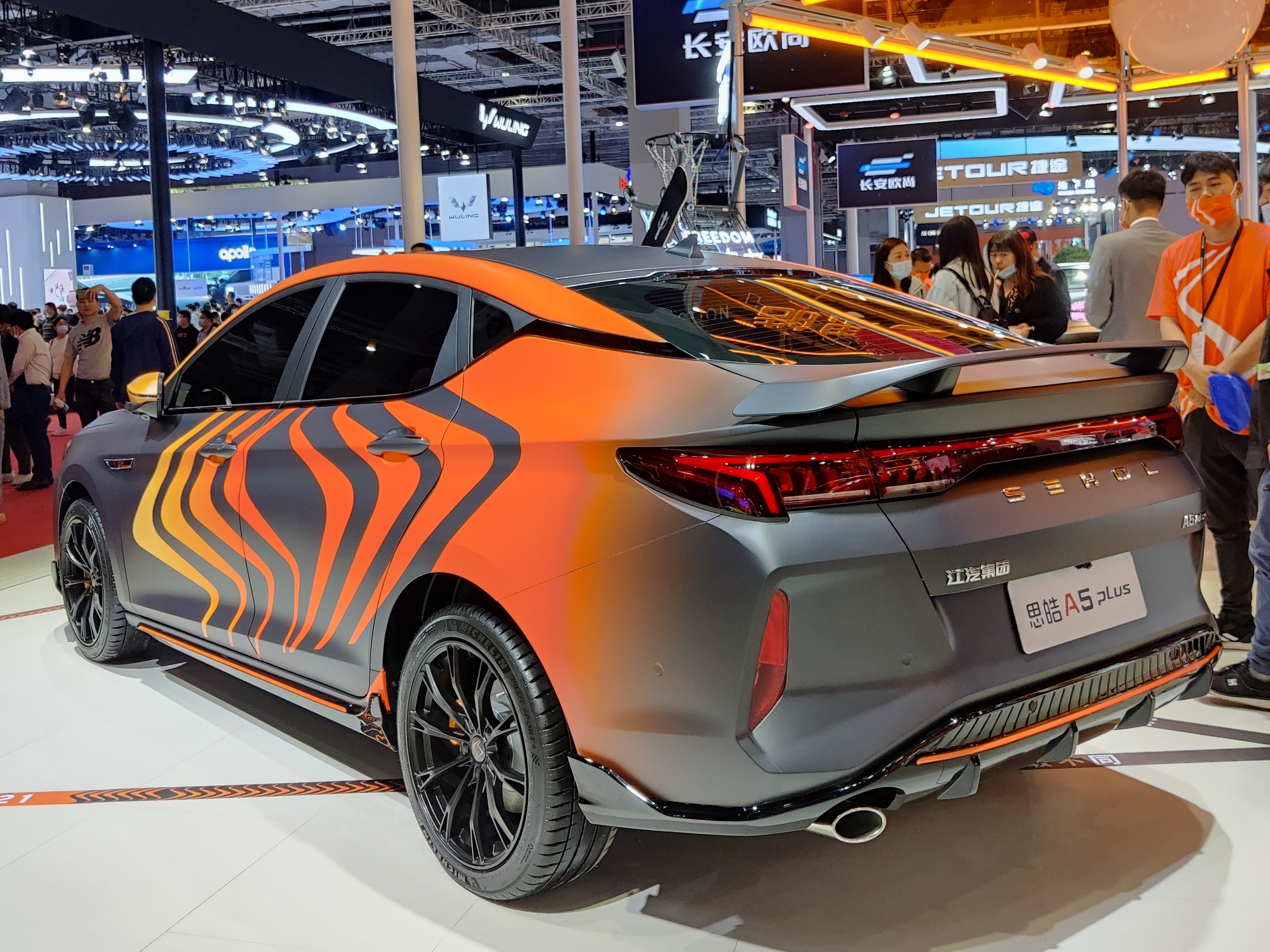
Sehol A5 Plus rear

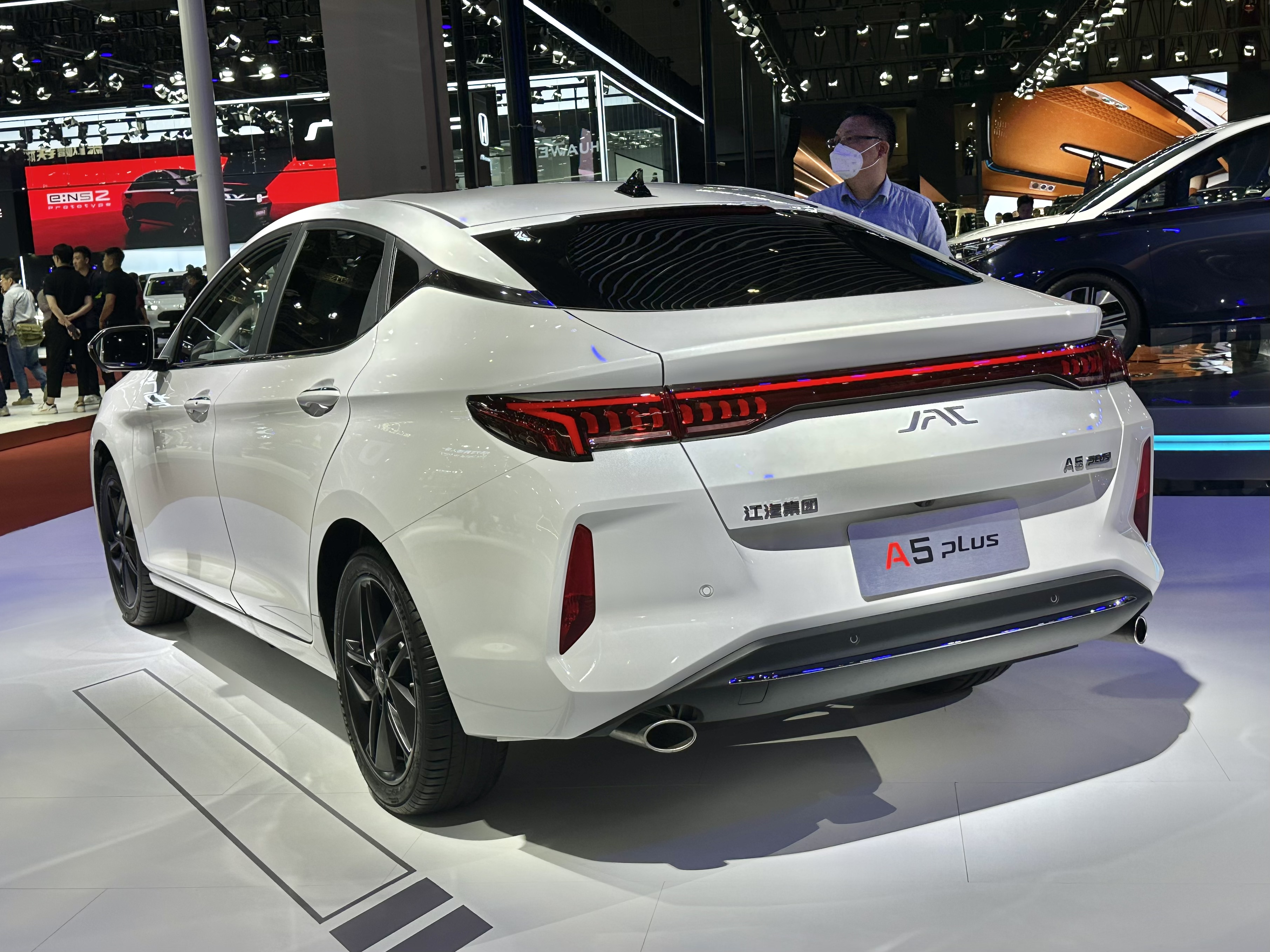
JAC A5 Plus rear at the 2023 Auto Shanghai

=== Specifications ===
The A5 Plus is powered by a 1.5-liter TGDI turbo engine code named HFC4GC1.6E shared with the Sehol QX, mated to 7-speed DCT gearbox.

=== Sehol Aipao/ Yiwei Aipao (electric variant) ===
An electric variant based on the A5 Plus originally called the Sehol E50A Pro was also developed and was planned to be launched in 2022. As of March 2022, presales of an updated variant essentially being the final production of the Sehol E50A Pro called the Sehol Aipao (爱跑) was launched with a 64 kWh battery set producing a maximum power output of 142 kW (190 hp; 193 PS) and 340 N⋅m (251 lb⋅ft) capable of a top speed of 142 km/h (88 mph) and 0–100 km/h (62 mph) acceleration takes 7.6 seconds. After the discontinuation of the Sehol brand, the Aipao was rebadged as the JAC Yiwei Aipao under the JAC Yiwei (江淮钇为) NEV series.

== Sales ==
Year	China				Total
Year	A5 Plus	Aipao	Yao	Total	Total
2023	—	885	1,075	980	
2024	—	63	583	646	47,913
2025	—	—	283	283	
