= Sehol E10X =

Battery electric city car

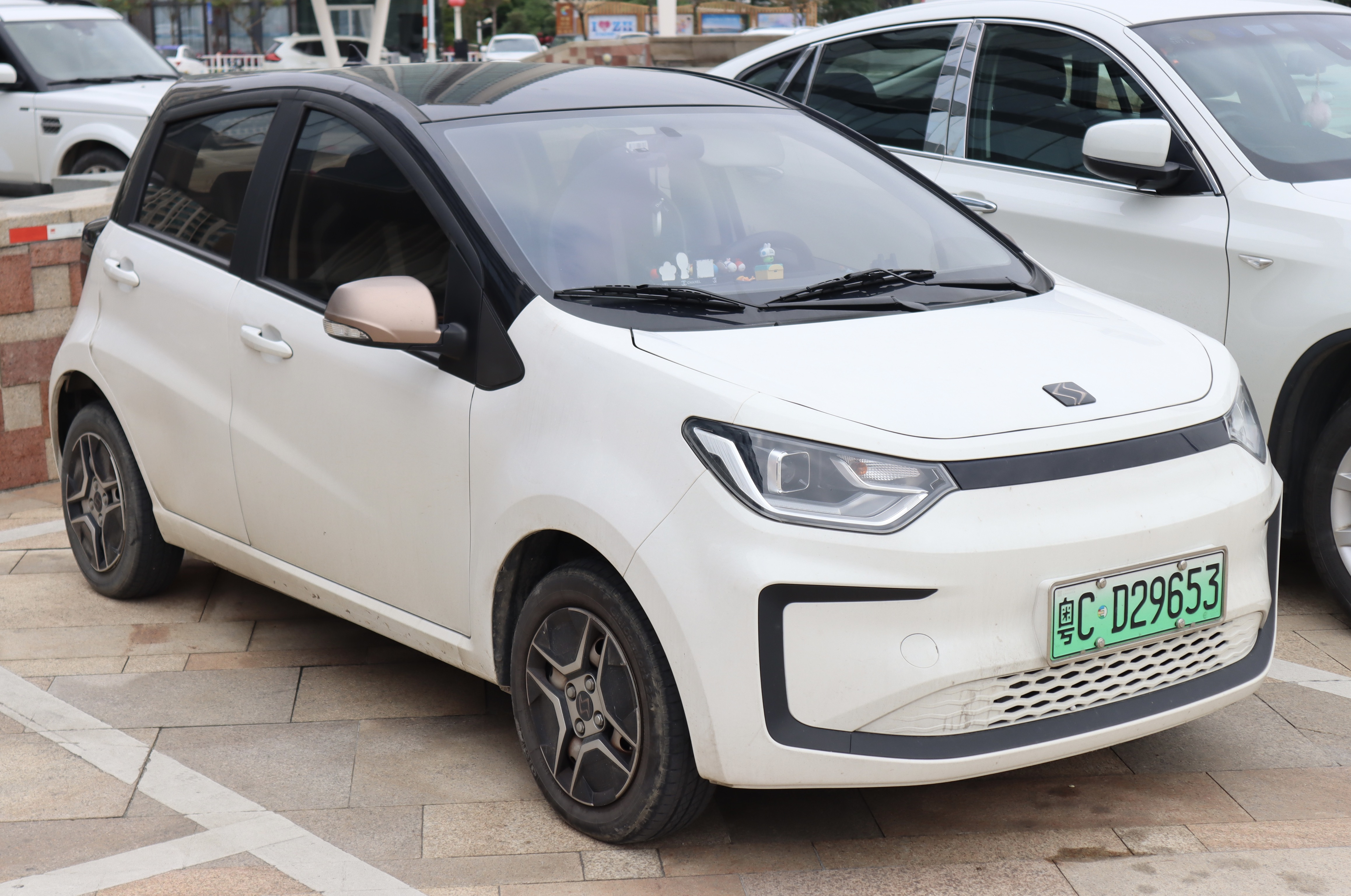

Overview
- Manufacturer: Sehol
- Also called: JAC e-JS1; JAC E10X; JAC Yiwei Hua Xian Zi
- Production: 2021–present
- Assembly: China: Hefei

Body and chassis
- Class: City car (A)
- Body style: 5-door hatchback
- Layout: Front-motor, front-wheel drive
- Related: JAC Yueyue; JAC iEV6E

Powertrain
- Electric motor: Permanent magnet synchronous
- Power output: 30 kW-45 kW (41 PS-61 PS; 40 hp-60 hp)
- Transmission: 1-speed direct-drive
- Battery: Li-ion battery: 15 kWh; 19.7 kWh; 30.2 kWh
- Electric range: 150–302 km (93–188 mi) (NEDC)

Dimensions
- Wheelbase: 2,390 mm (94.1 in)
- Length: 3,650 mm (143.7 in)
- Width: 1,670 mm (65.7 in)
- Height: 1,495 mm (58.9 in)
- Curb weight: 1,080 kg (2,381 lb)

The Sehol E10X is a battery electric city car produced by Sehol of JAC Group based on the same platform as the JAC iEV6E from 2016 which also shared the same platform as the JAC Yueyue and JAC Refine S2 Mini.

On 1 June 2024, the 200,000th E10X was produced.

== Overview ==
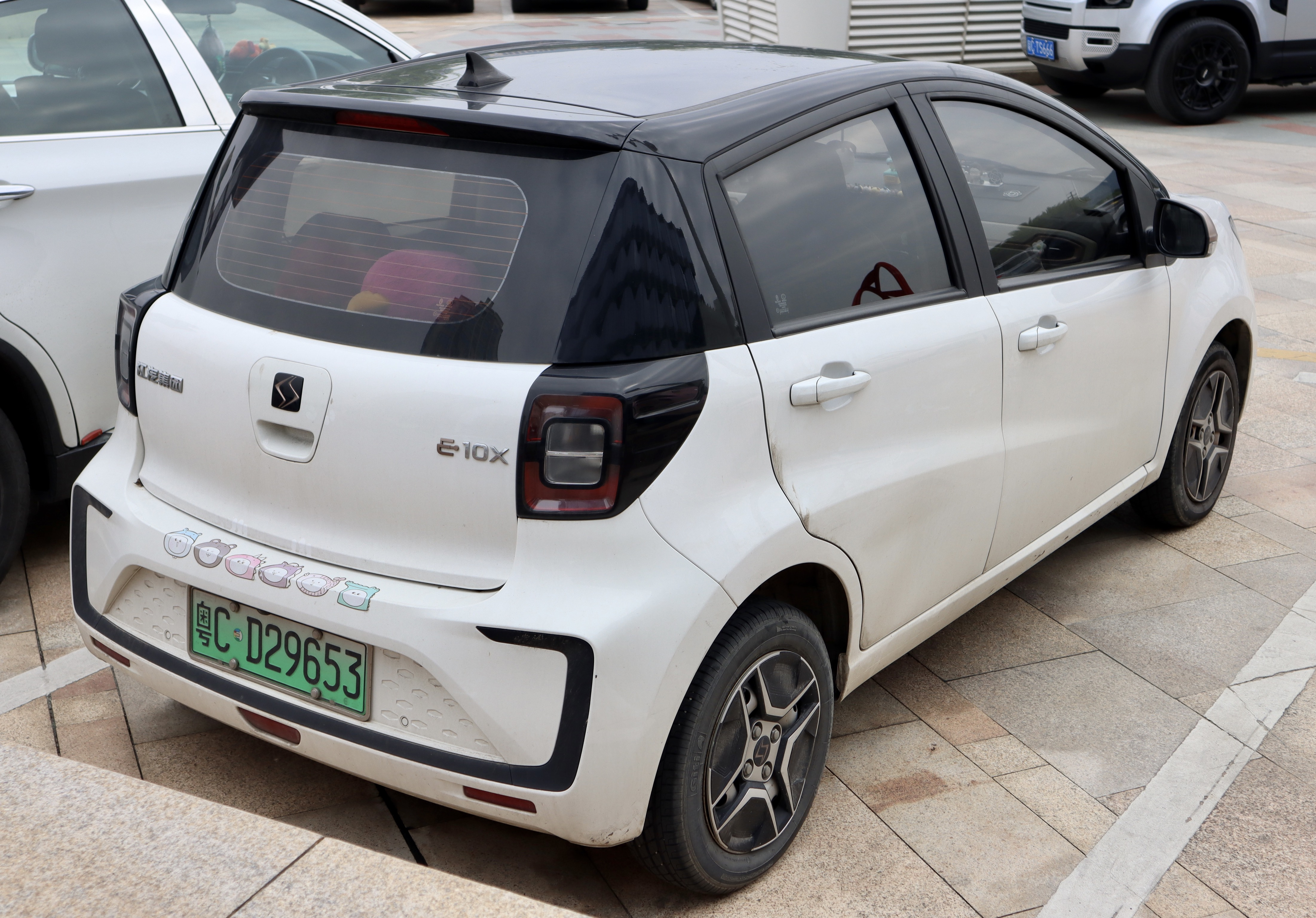
Rear view

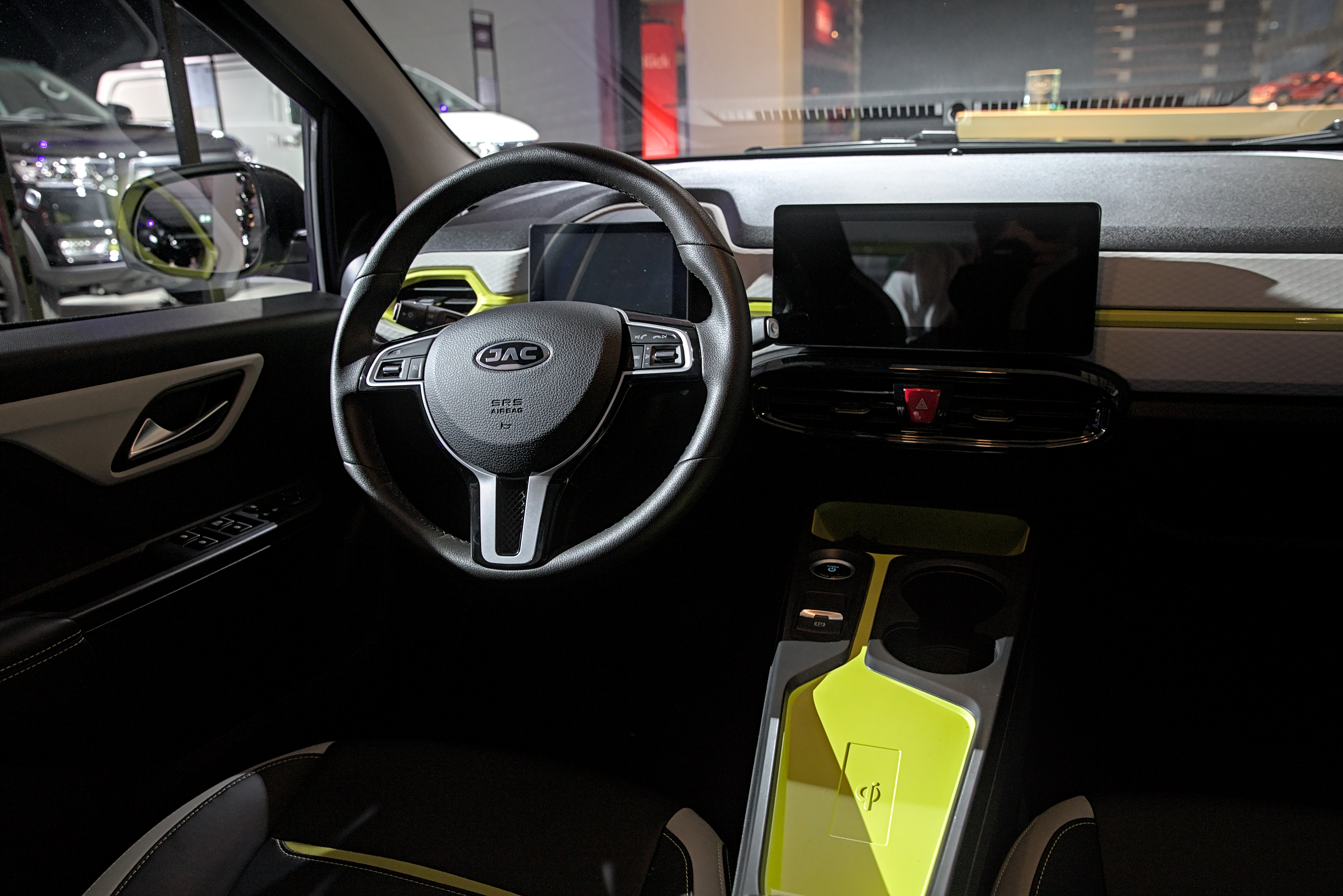
Interior

Teased during a battery technology display in November 2020, the E10X was officially launched in 2021 with presales starting in March 2021 and debut in April at the 2021 Shanghai Auto Show. It is equipped with MacPherson struts in the front and a twist-beam suspension in the rear.

== Powertrain ==
In terms of power, the E10X is powered by a selection of two electric motors rated at 41 PS (40 hp / 30 kW) and 61 PS (60 hp / 45 kW). The max torque of the motors respectively amounts to 95 Nm (70 lb-ft) and 150 Nm (110 lb-ft). Both variants top out at 102 km/h (63 mph) and drive the front axle.

== Battery ==
The E10X is equipped with cobalt-free LFP batteries. The battery of the base model is a 15-kWh traction battery good for 150 km (93 miles) of NEDC-rated range, with more expensive 19.7-kWh variant with 200 km of range and 30.2-kWh variant with 302 km of range available as well. The charging port is concealed in the front left fender.

== Trim levels ==
There are seven trim levels of the E10X to choose from. The entry model includes air conditioning, a single airbag, ABS, Isofix, power windows, and power mirrors. Higher trim models add a second airbag, ESP, imitation leather, keyless entry and launch, cruise control, an infotainment system with voice command support and OTA updates, a wireless charger, USB slots, and more. The cabin of the E10X can accommodate either four or five occupants.

== Safety ==
It scored zero stars in the Latin NCAP 3.0 crash test in December 2022 (similar to Euro NCAP 2014).

Latin NCAP 3.0 test results JAC E-JS1 / E10x / E-S1 / S1 + 2 Airbags (2022, similar to Euro NCAP 2014)
Test	Points	%
Overall:	0 /5 stars	
Adult occupant:	0.00	0%
Child occupant:	3.11	6%
Pedestrian:	9.72	20%
Safety assist:	3.00	7%

== Sales ==
Year	China
2023	7,884
2024	3,143
2025	1,334
