= Sehol A5 =

Compact liftback

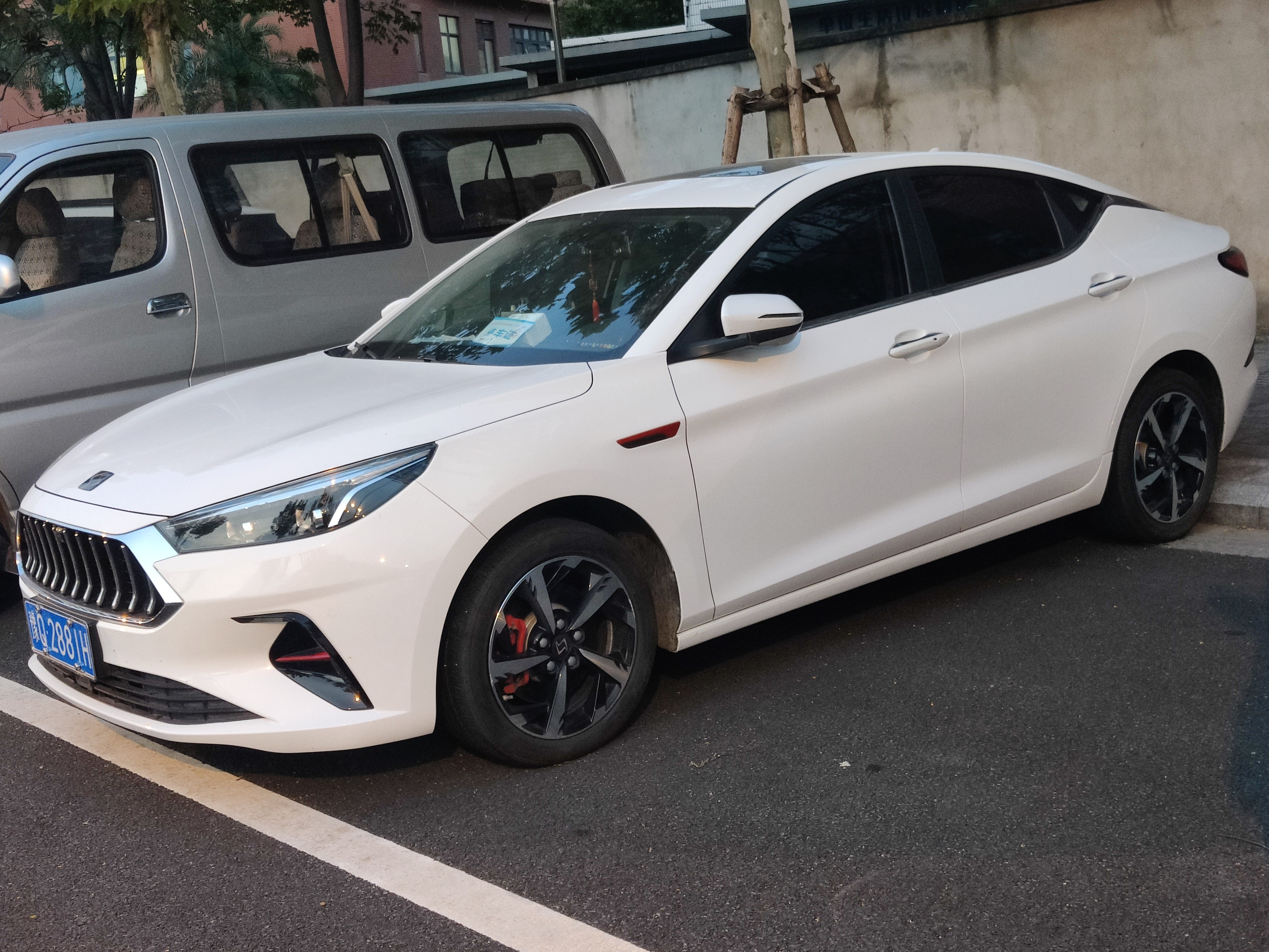
- Sehol A5

Overview
- Manufacturer: Sehol (JAC Motors)
- Also called: JAC Jiayue A5; Sehol E50A/Aipao (electric version); JAC iC5 (electric version); JAC J7 (Kazakhstan, Mexico, Russia and Middle East); JAC E J7 (electric version, Mexico); KMC EJ7 (electric version, Iran)
- Production: 2019–present
- Model years: 2020–present
- Assembly: China: Hefei
- Designer: Daniele Gaglione (exterior); Giancarlo Concilio (interior)

Body and chassis
- Class: Compact car (C)
- Body style: 5-door liftback
- Platform: Jianghuai C
- Related: Sehol A5 Plus

Powertrain
- Engine: Petrol: 1.5 L turbo I4
- Electric motor: Permanent Magnet Synchronous Motor (EV)
- Transmission: 6-speed manual CVT; 1-speed direct-drive (EV)
- Battery: 50.1 KWh Lithium-ion battery (EV); 64.5 kWh Lithium-ion battery (EV)
- Range: 402 km (249 Mi); 530 km (329 Mi)

Dimensions
- Wheelbase: 2,760 mm (108.7 in)
- Length: 4,755 mm (187.2 in)
- Width: 1,820 mm (71.7 in)
- Height: 1,495 mm (58.9 in)
- Curb weight: 1,432 kg (3,157.0 lb); 1,440 kg (3,174.7 lb)

Chronology
- Predecessor: JAC J5
- Successor: JAC A5 Plus (certain models)

The Sehol A5 (Chinese: 江淮嘉悦A5), named the JAC Jiayue A5 until 2021, is a compact liftback produced by JAC Motors under the Sehol sub brand since 2019.

== Overview ==
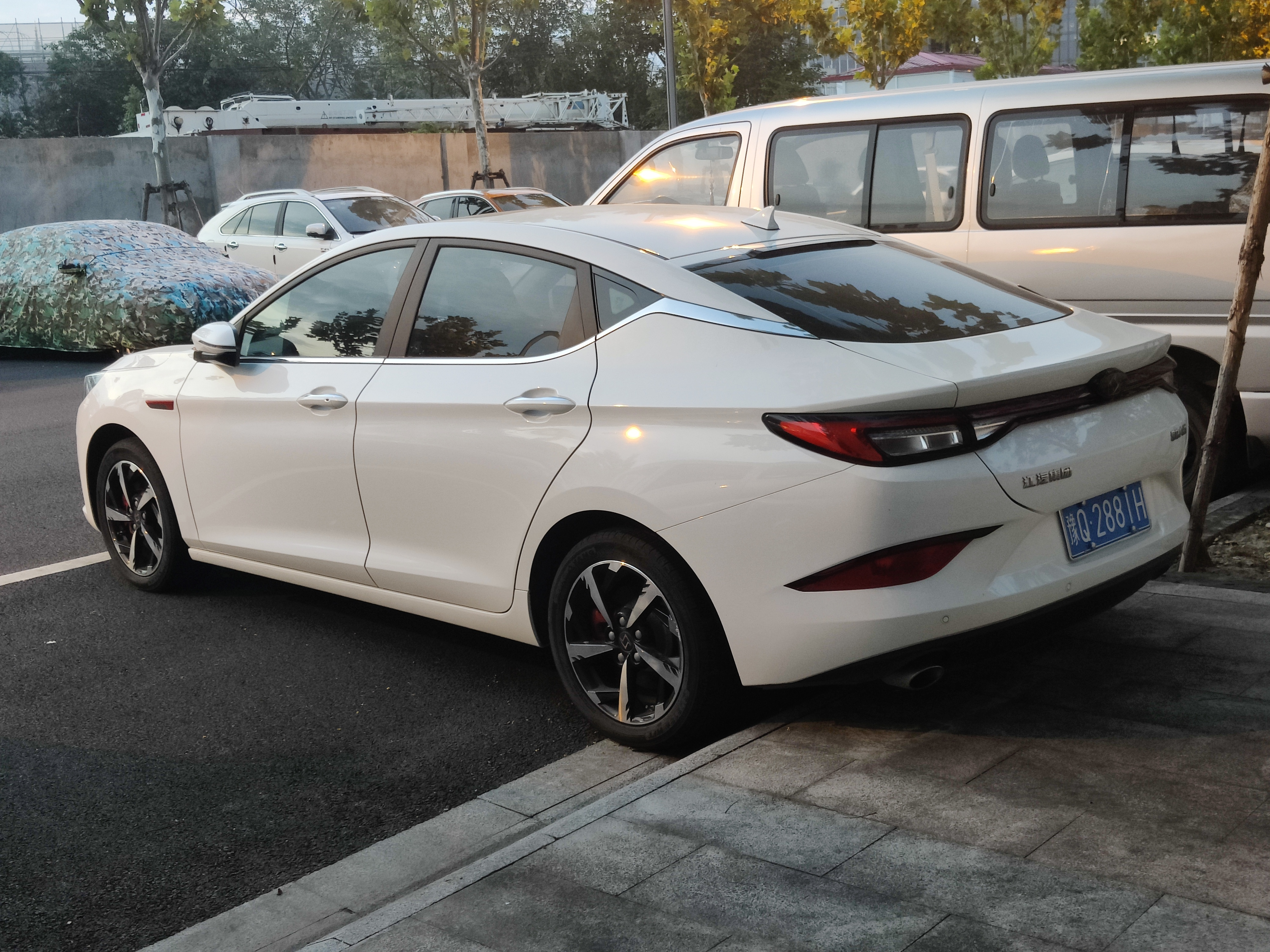
Sehol A5 (JAC Jiayue A5) rear

The then-called JAC Jiayue A5 was revealed on 5 September 2019 at the Chengdu Auto Show and went on sale on 20 November 2019. It is the first vehicle under the Jiayue sub-brand.

The Sehol A5, originally code named JAC A432, was designed at the JAC Design Center in Turin, Italy. The exterior was designed by Daniele Gaglione, formerly at Alfa Romeo, while the interior was designed by Giancarlo Concilio, formerly at Lancia and Maserati.

In 2021, the JAC Jiayue A5 was renamed the Sehol A5.

=== Specifications ===
The A5 is powered by a 1.5 liter turbo engine, mated to 6-speed manual and CVT gearboxes. The A5 interior features include a 7-inch digital instrument cluster, a 10.4 inch touchscreen, and 64-color ambient lighting. The price range is RMB 84,800-115,800 (12,661–17,289 in USD).

=== JAC iC5/JAC E J7/Sehol E50A (electric variant) ===
The JAC iC5 is the all-electric version of the Jiayue A5. It debuted at Auto Guangzhou in November 2019 as the "A5 EV" and was available for pre-order from February 2020 before going on sale in April 2020 as the iC5.

On 28 June 2021, JAC's Mexican division announced the iC5's arrival for late 2021 to expand JAC's line of electric cars sold in that market, and will be sold as the E J7

The Sehol E50A or previously the Sol E50A is the rebadged version of the iC5. The E50A is equipped with a 193 hp and 340N·m electric motor. The battery is a 64.5kWh battery with a range of 530 km rated by NEDC.

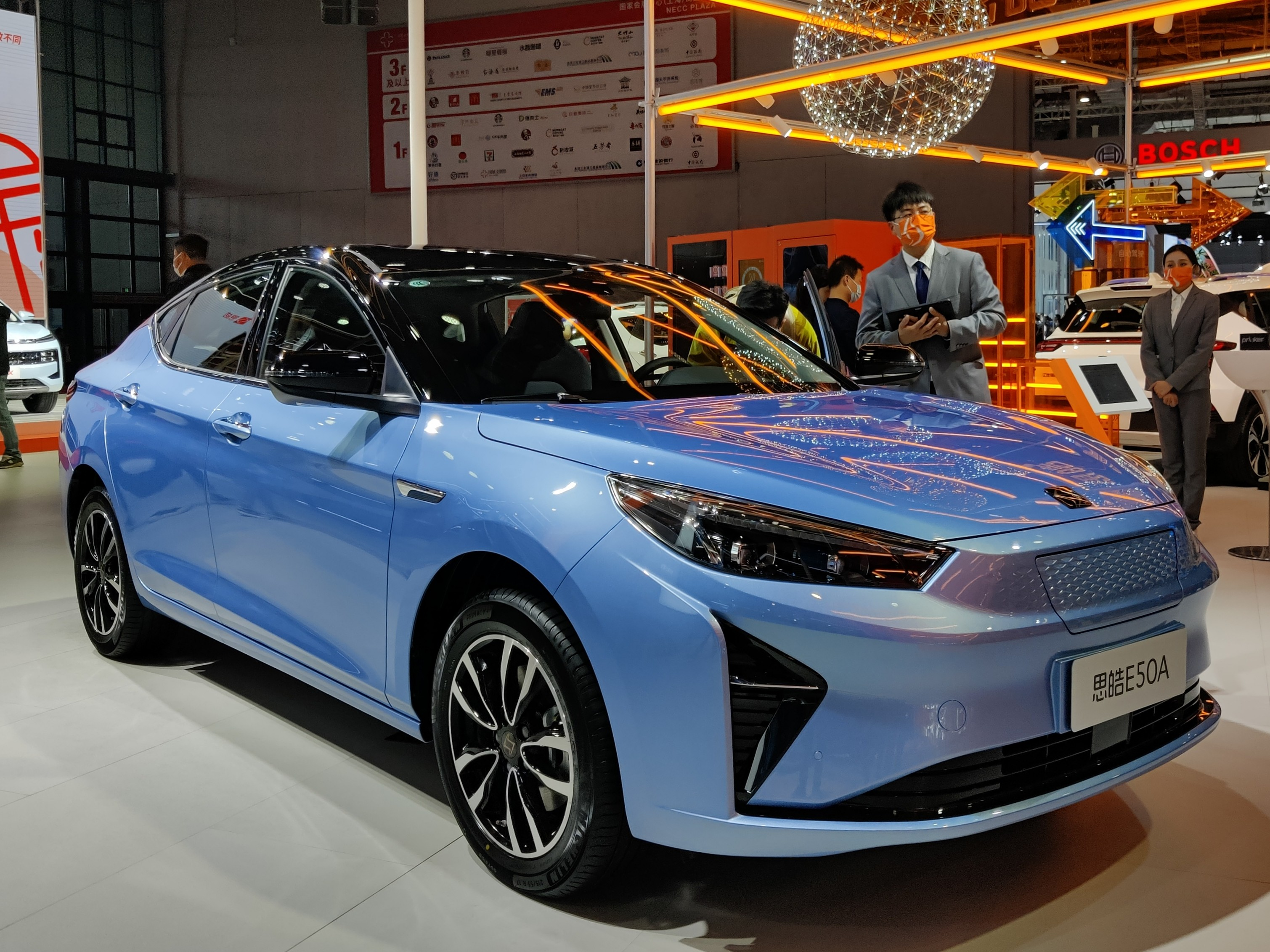
Sehol E50A

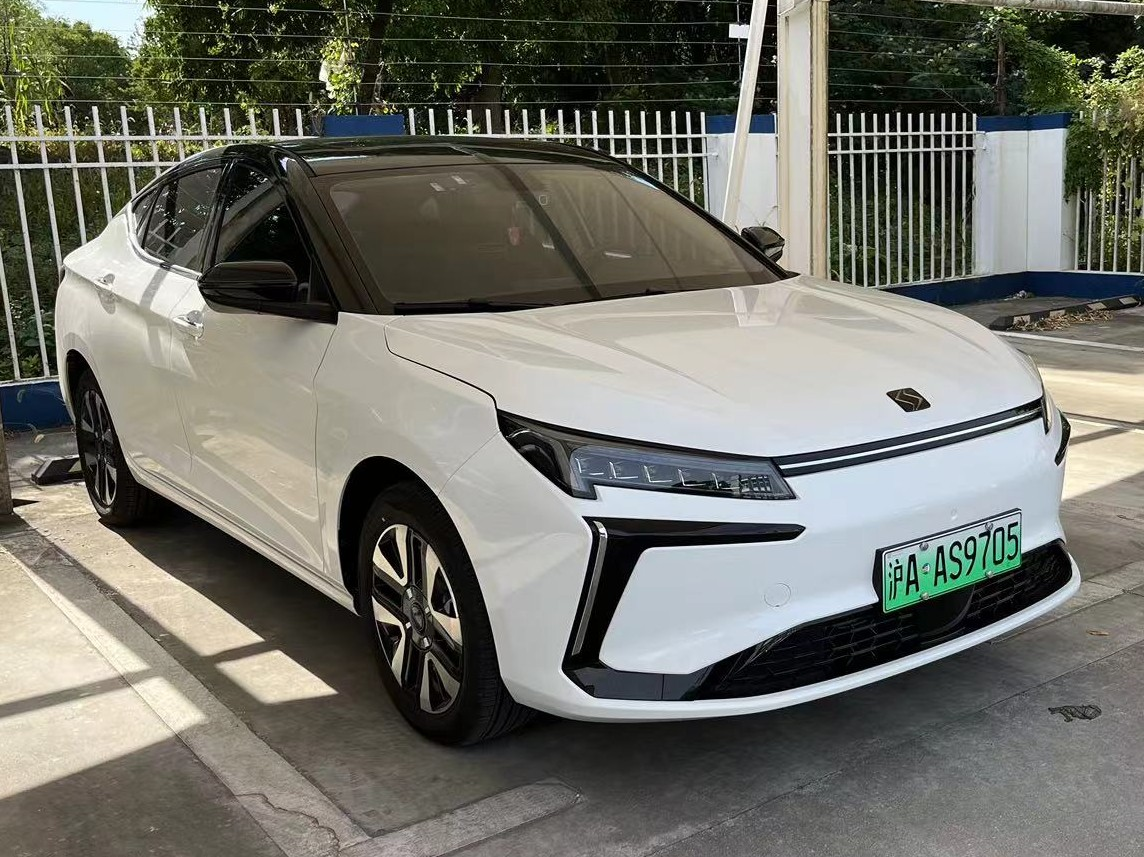
Sehol E50A facelift

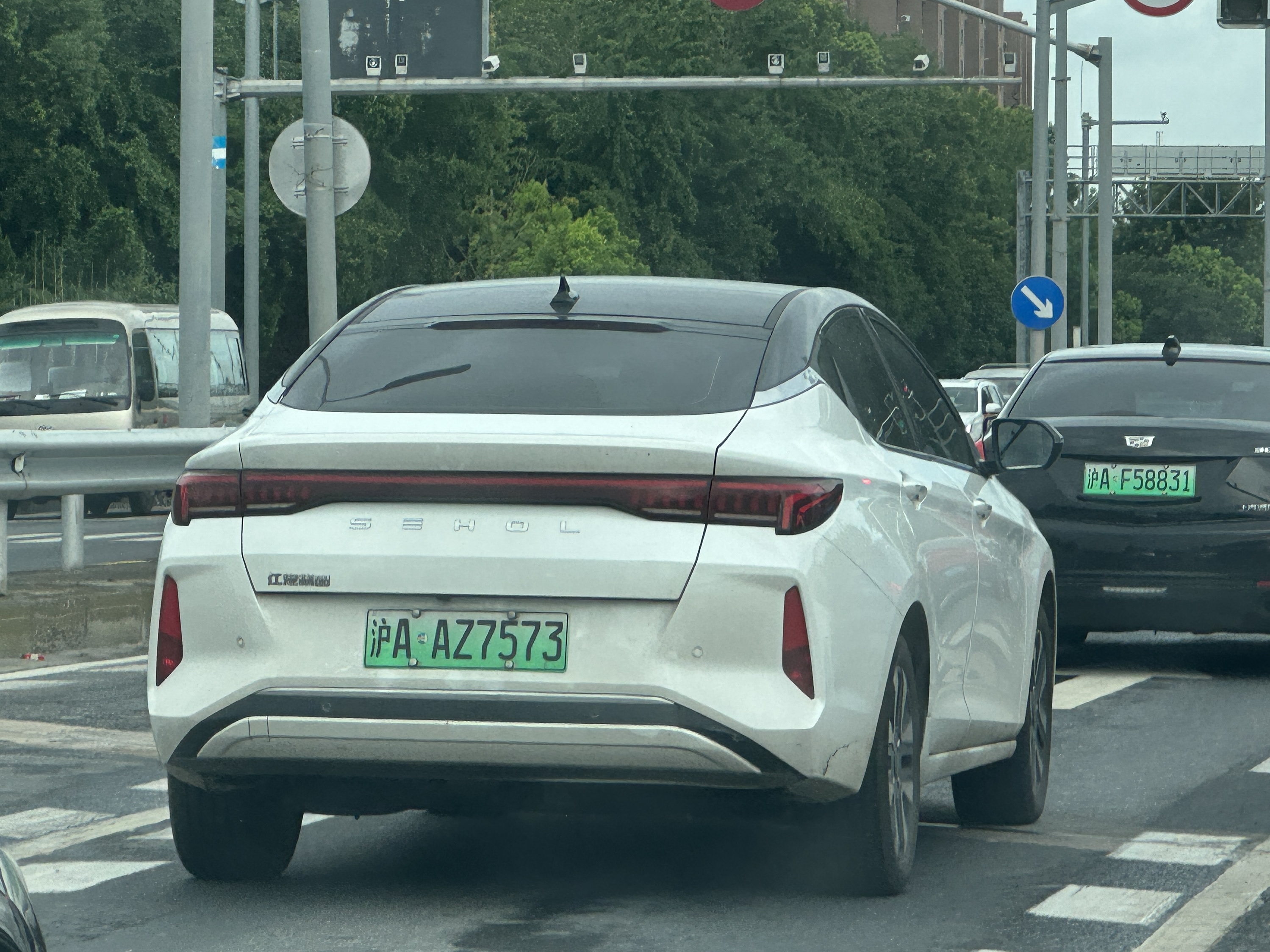
Sehol E50A facelift rear

== International markets ==
The JAC Jiayue A5 is sold in Kazakhstan, Mexico, Russia, Iran and the Persian Gulf Countries as the JAC J7.

On 2 December 2020, the JAC J7 was launched in Mexico. It is offered in the Advanced, Quantum and Limited trim lines.

On 31 December 2020, the JAC J7 was launched in Russia.

In 2021, the JAC J7 will be manufactured and sold in Kazakhstan by Saryarka AvtoProm (Сарыарка АвтоПром).

== Sales ==
JAC Motors has sold a total of 34,336 Jiayue A5s since its launch November 2019 as of August 2020, excluding 1,158 sales of the iC5 electric variant. The grand total is 35,494.

Calendar year	A5 (China)	iC5/E50A (China)	Total	Notes
2019	8,153	-	8,153	A5 sales start in November
2020	26,183*	1,158*	27,341*	iC5 sales start in April; *Data as of October 2020
2021	-	-	0	
2022				
2023	2,932	2,237		
2024	164	763		
2025	53	1,804		
