= JAC Refine M4 =

Large MPV

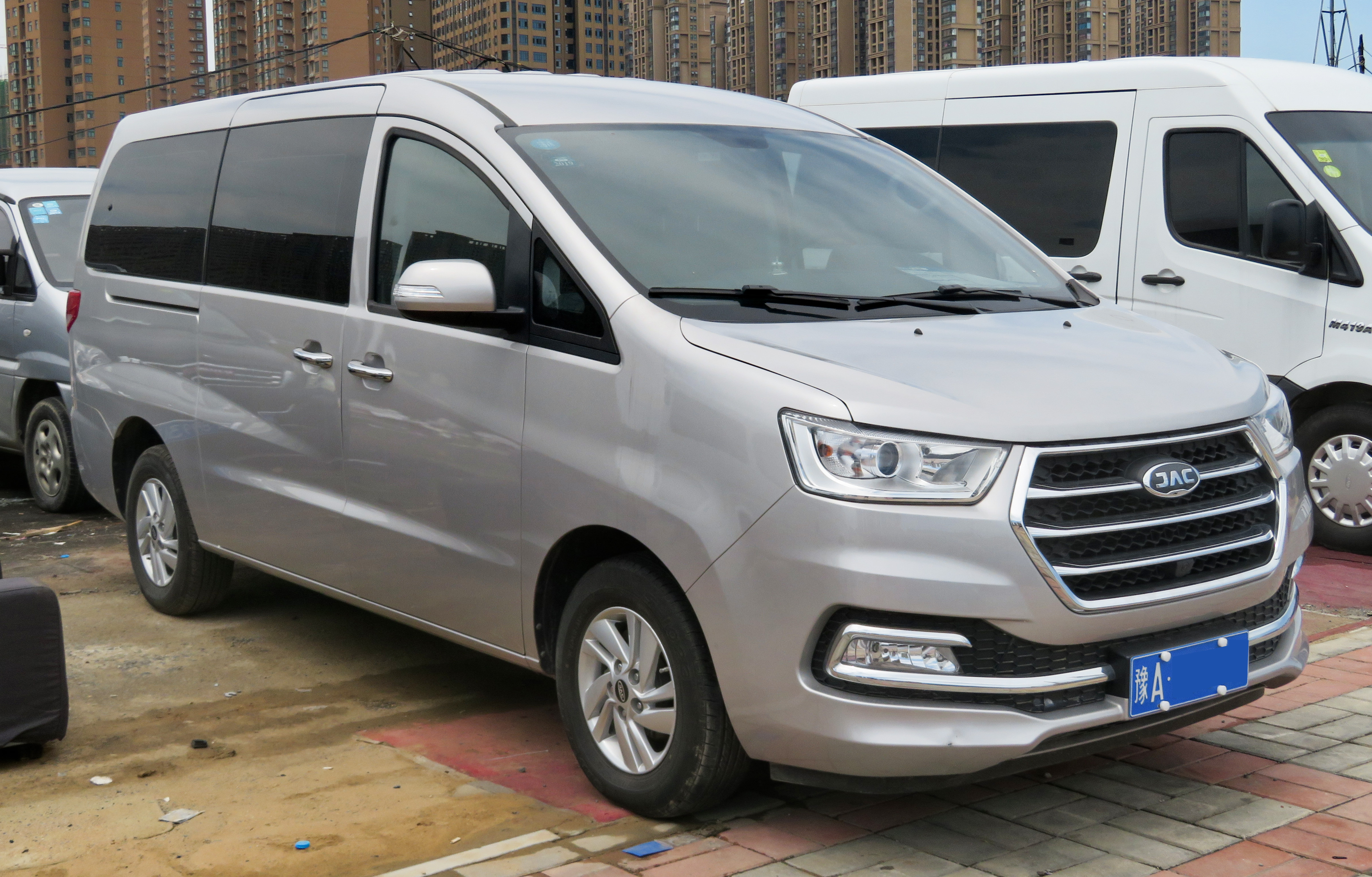

Overview
- Manufacturer: JAC Group
- Production: 2016–present
- Model years: 2017–present
- Assembly: China: Hefei

Body and chassis
- Class: Large MPV (M)
- Body style: 4-door minivan

Powertrain
- Engine: 1.5 L HFC4GC1-6D I4 (turbo hybrid petrol); 2.0 L HFC4GA3-3D I4 (petrol); 2.0 L HFC4GA3-4D I4 (turbo petrol); 1.9 L HFC4DB1-2D I4 (turbo diesel)
- Transmission: 6-speed manual 5-speed manual

Dimensions
- Wheelbase: 121 in (3,080 mm)
- Length: 205 in (5,200 mm)
- Width: 74 in (1,890 mm)
- Height: 78 in (1,970 mm)

The JAC Refine M4 is a large MPV produced by JAC Group since 2016.

== Overview ==
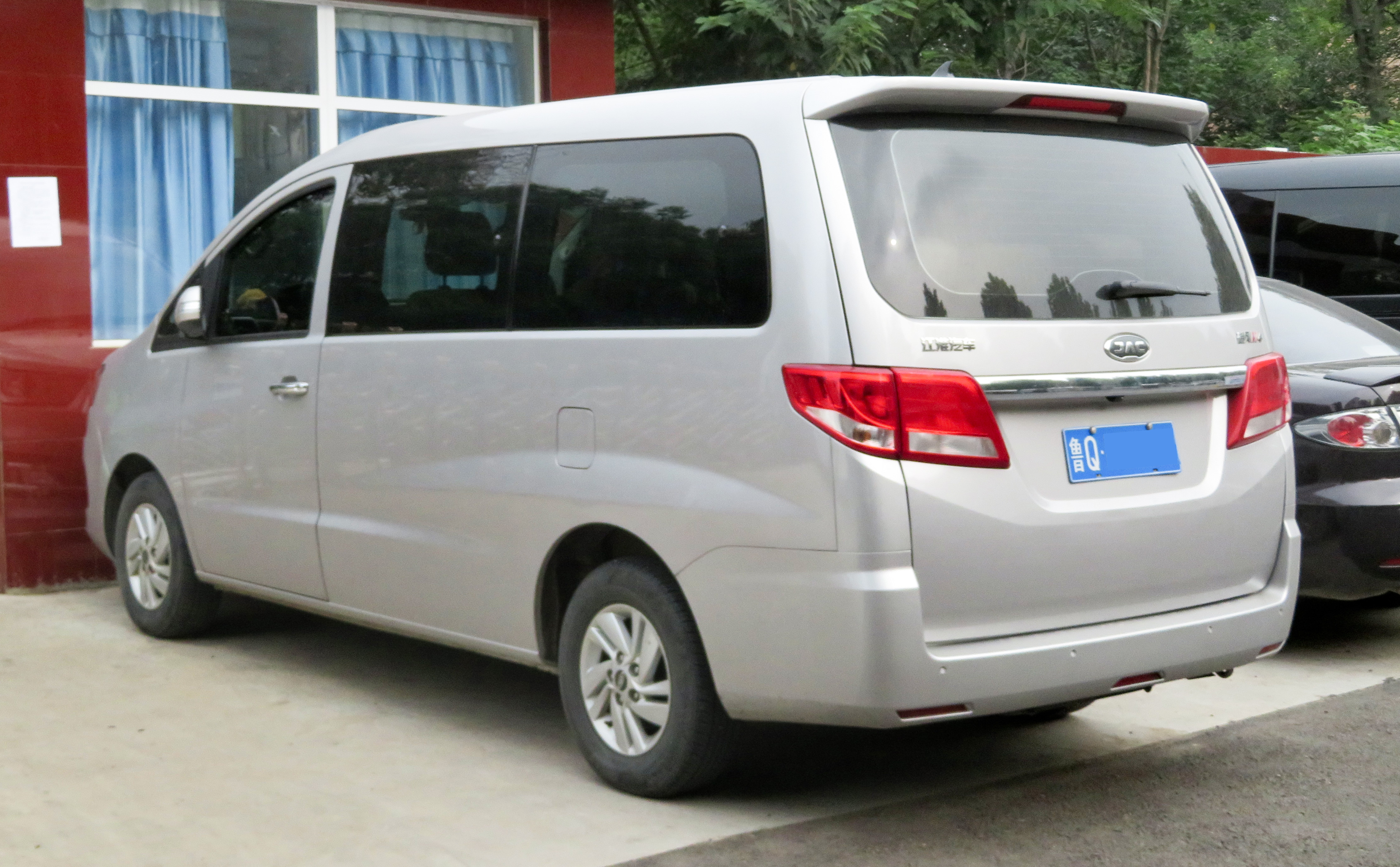
Rear view

Positioning above the Refine M3 compact MPV, the Refine M4 made its first public appearance during the 2016 Beijing Auto Show. According to the official website, pricing for the Refine M4 ranges from 99,800 to 169,800 yuan, making the Refine M4 a more premium product when compared to the Refine M3. It may have looked like the Toyota Alphard for some reason.

== Specifications ==
At launch in October 2016, the Refine M4 is powered by a 2.0 liter engine producing 147hp（108kW）and 196N·m mated to a 5-speed manual gearbox. A 2.0 liter turbo engine mated to a 6-speed manual gearbox, a 1.9 liter CTI engine mated to a 6-speed manual gearbox, and a 1.5 liter TGI Hyboost engine mated to a 6-speed manual gearbox was added later in 2017.

=== 2018 (facelift) ===
The Refine M4 received a facelift in 2018. Styling wise, the update is mainly on the front, featuring an updated grille. In terms of specifications, higher trim models receive an upgrade on the rear suspensions while business class models received additional features such as electronic stability control. In terms of powertrain, besides the 48V light hybrid 2018 model year 1.5 liter turbo version, the 1.9 liter turbo diesel engine models, 2.0 liter engine models, and 2.0 liter turbo gasoline engine models are also available. The 1.5 liter turbo engine produces 128kW and is paired with a 12kW electric motor, with the engine producing 251N·m and electric motor producing 55N·m mated to a 6-speed manual gearbox. The 1.9 liter turbo diesel engine models, 2.0 liter engine models, and 2.0 liter turbo gasoline engine models produces 102kW, 108kW, and 140kW respectively, with all engine mated to a 6-speed manual gearbox.

== JAC Refine E4 ==
The JAC Refine E4 is the electric variant of the Refine M4 available as a 7, 8, and 9 seater, and was first reported in 2023. The Refine E4 is based on the post-facelift Refine M4 with a 130kW electric motor supplied by Gotion High tech Co Ltd., and batteries supplied by Anhui Jianghuai Sinoev Battery System Co., Ltd..
