= JAC QX =

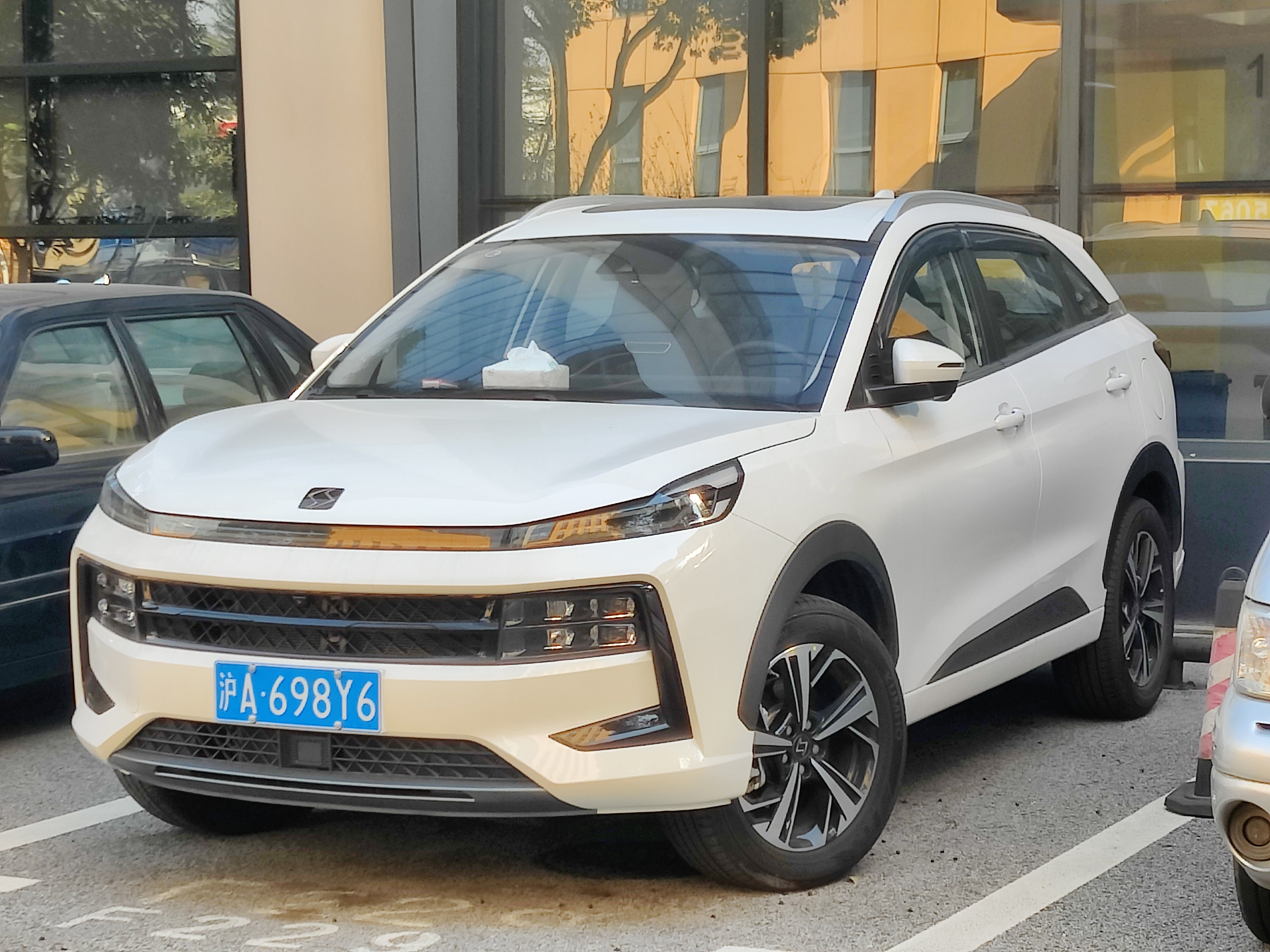
- Sehol QX

Overview
- Manufacturer: Sehol (JAC Motors)
- Also called: JAC JS6; Sol QX; JAC Sei 6 Pro; JAC S6 (Azerbaijan); KMC JS6 (Iran); Evo 7 Kairos (Italy); GTV Caesar (Cambodia)
- Production: 2021–present
- Assembly: China: Hefei; Iran: Bam (KMC)

Body and chassis
- Class: Compact crossover SUV (C)
- Body style: 5-door SUV
- Platform: Jianghuai GSE

Powertrain
- Engine: Petrol: 1.5 L HFC4GC1.6E turbo I4
- Power output: 137 kW (184 hp; 187 PS)
- Transmission: 6-speed manual; DCT

Dimensions
- Wheelbase: 2,720 mm (107.1 in)
- Length: 4,605 mm (181.3 in)
- Width: 1,890 mm (74.4 in)
- Height: 1,700 mm (66.9 in)

Chronology
- Predecessor: JAC Refine S5

The Sehol QX is a compact crossover SUV produced by JAC Motors under the Sehol brand. The Sehol QX was briefly called the Sol QX before launch and was renamed after the Sehol brand name was established. It is the first brand new model of the Sehol brand.

For outside China, the car was sold of rebadged JAC JS6.

== Overview ==
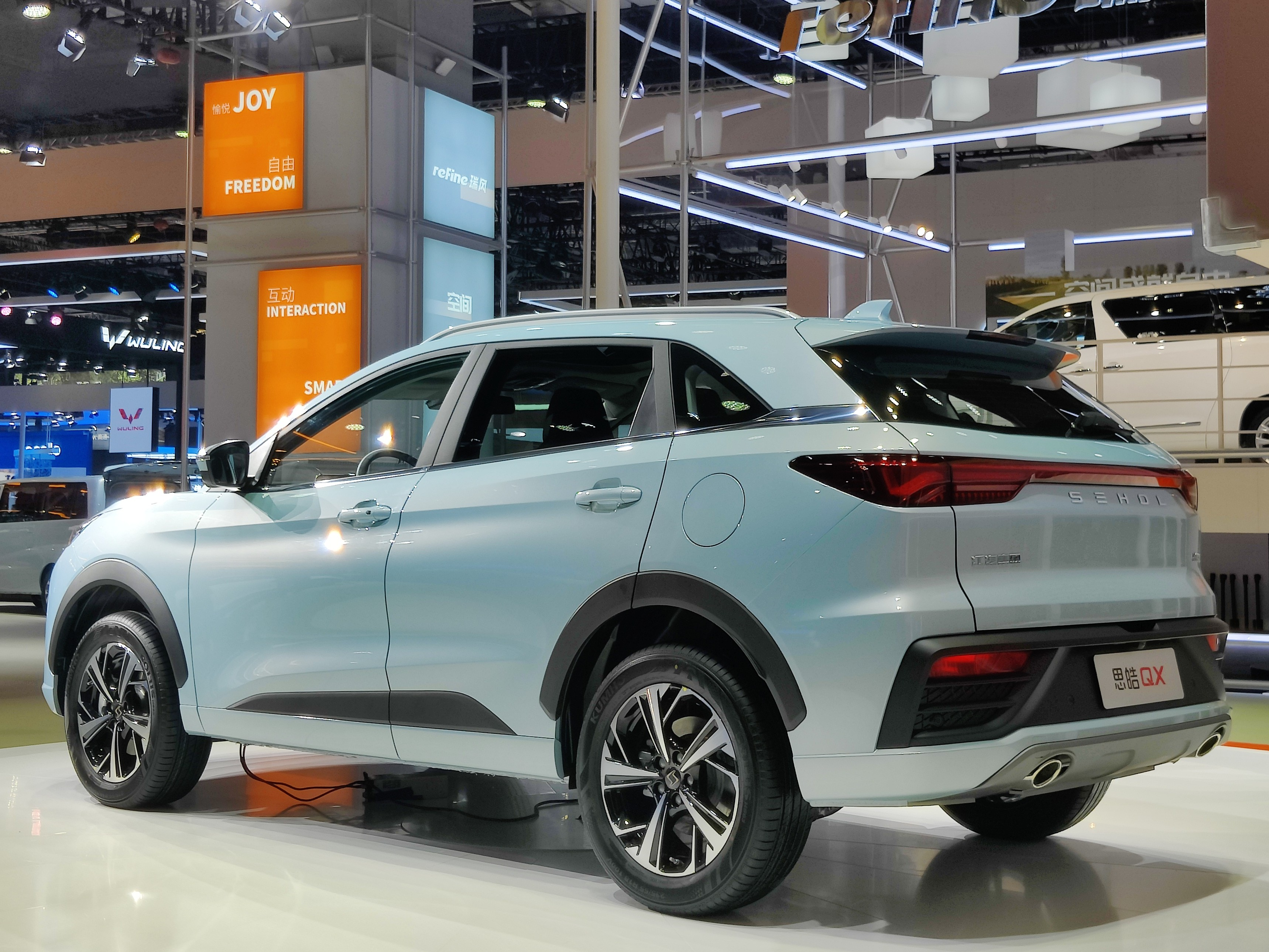
Sehol QX rear

The Sehol QX was launched on the Mainland Chinese market during 2021 Auto Shanghai. The internal code of the QX during development phase is S811. It is reported that the Sehol QX, Sol QX at the time is styled by the JAC Design Center in Turin, Italy, and incorporates Chinese style elements into the design. The Sehol QX was said to be built on JAC's new modular platform.

=== Powertrain ===
The only available engine is a 1.5-liter turbo engine developing 184 hp and 300 Nm with front-wheel-drive only. Transmission is a six-speed manual gearbox or dual-clutch transmission.

== JAC QX ==
In 2023, the JAC Motors launched a new plug-in hybrid version of the QX in China.

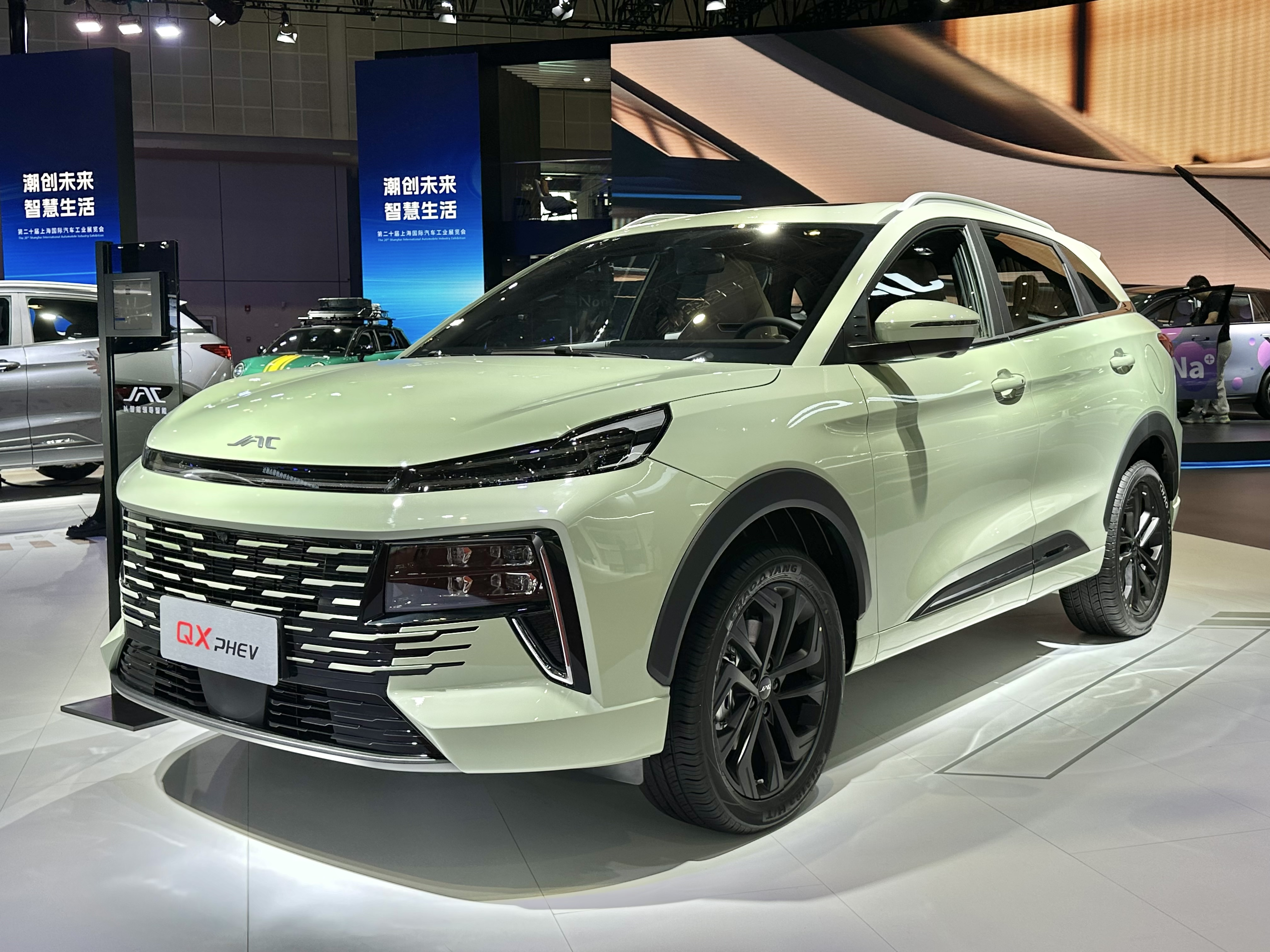
JAC QX PHEV front

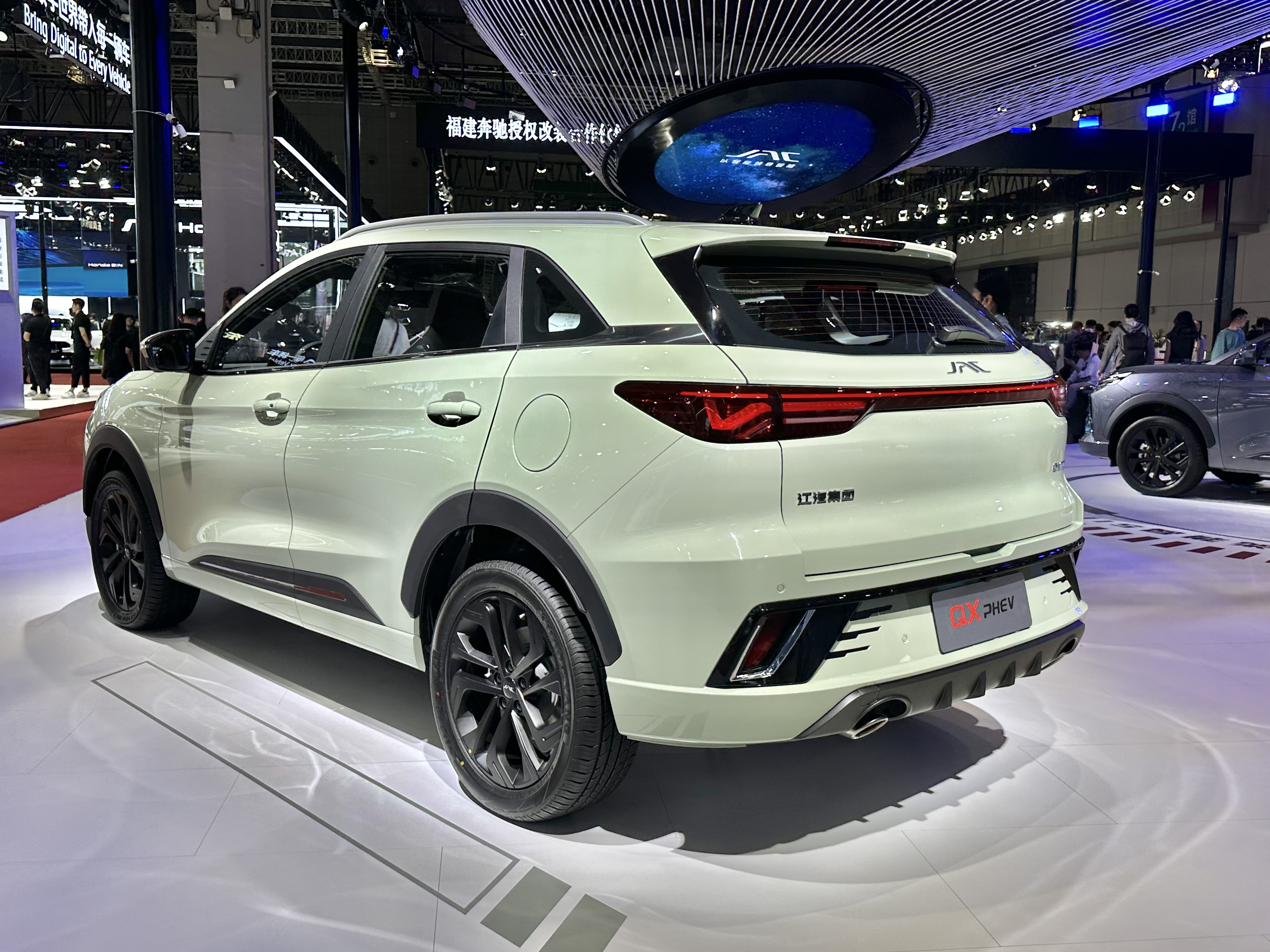
JAC QX PHEV rear
