= JAC Refine S7 =

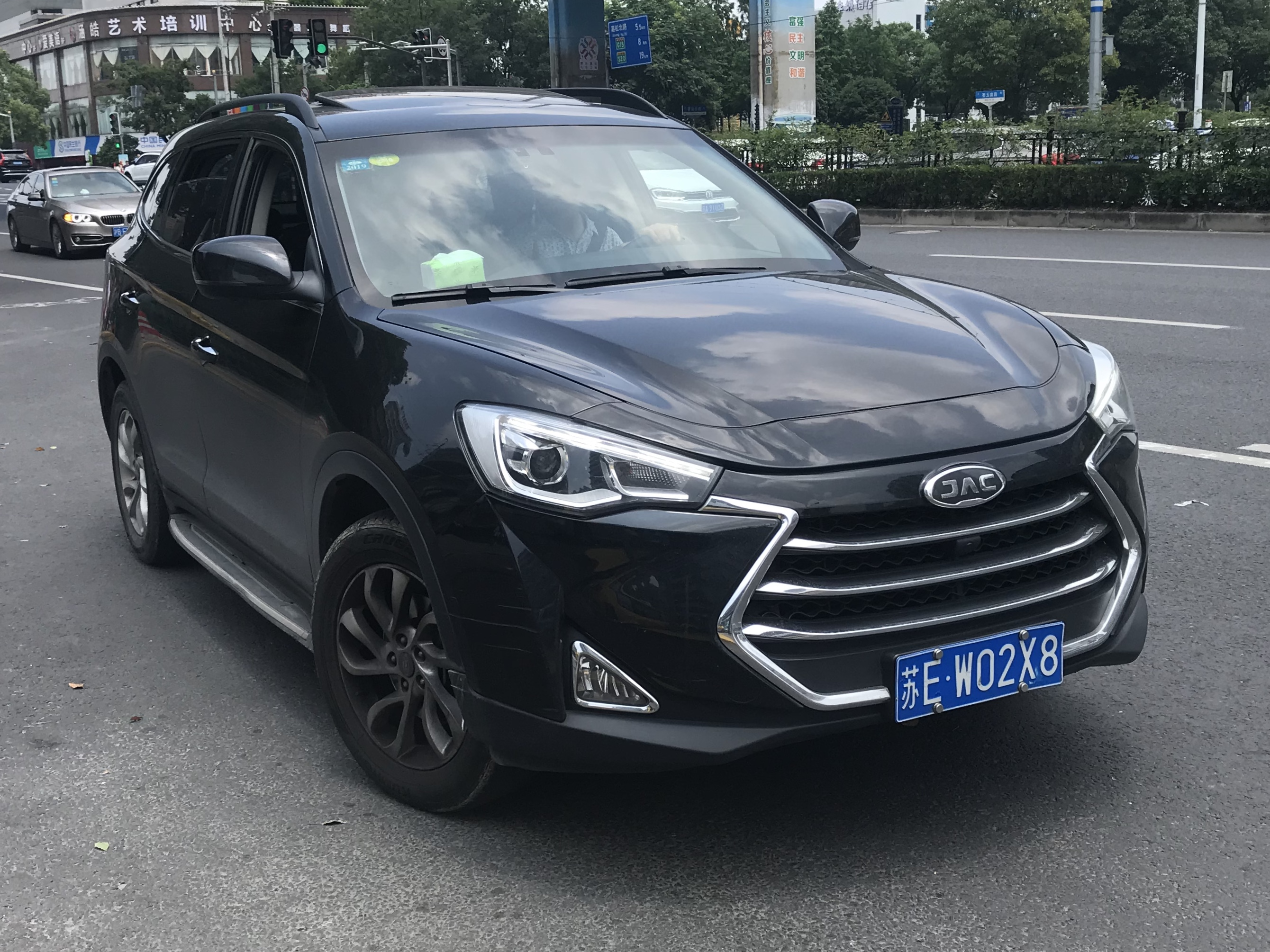
- Refine S7 pre-facelift (2017)

Overview
- Manufacturer: JAC Motors
- Also called: JAC T80; JAC Sei 7 (Mexico)
- Production: 2017–2020
- Model years: 2017–2020
- Assembly: China: Hefei; Mexico: Ciudad Sahagún

Body and chassis
- Class: Compact crossover SUV (C)
- Body style: 5-door SUV
- Platform: Jianghuai SS
- Related: JAC Refine A60; Sehol X7

Powertrain
- Engine: Petrol: 1.5 L I4 turbo; 2.0 L I4 turbo
- Transmission: 6-speed manual 6-speed dual-clutch

Dimensions
- Wheelbase: 2,800 mm (110.2 in)
- Length: 4,800 mm (189.0 in)
- Width: 1,900 mm (74.8 in)
- Height: 1,760 mm (69.3 in)
- Curb weight: 1,755 kg (3,869 lb)

Chronology
- Predecessor: JAC Rein
- Successor: Sehol X7

The JAC Refine S7 is a compact crossover SUV produced by JAC Motors. In Mexico is assembled in CKD kits in Cudad Sahagún plant by Giant Motors and was renamed JAC Sei 7. In Latin America the vehicles was sold as JAC T80.

== Overview ==
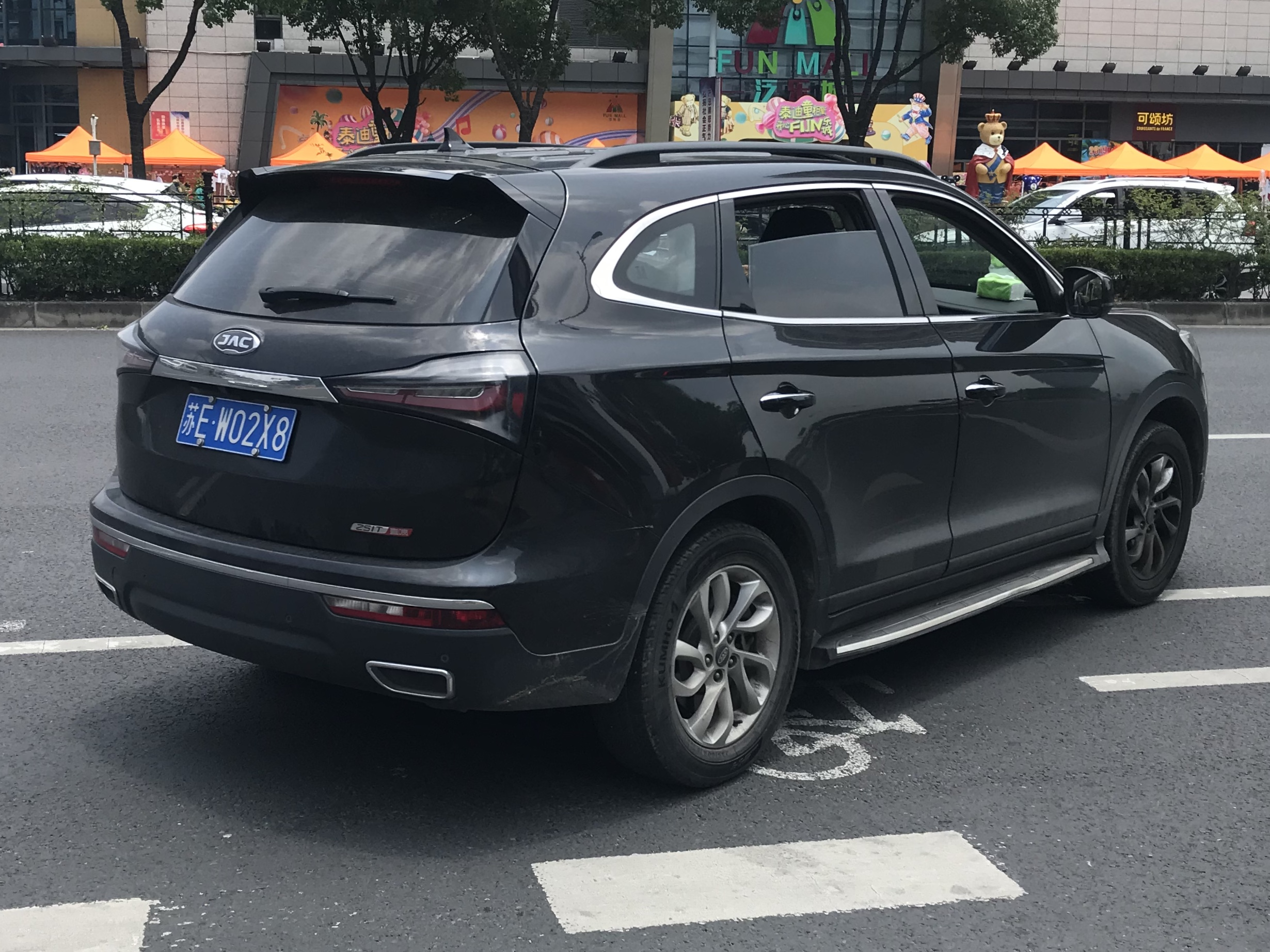
Refine S7 pre-facelift rear

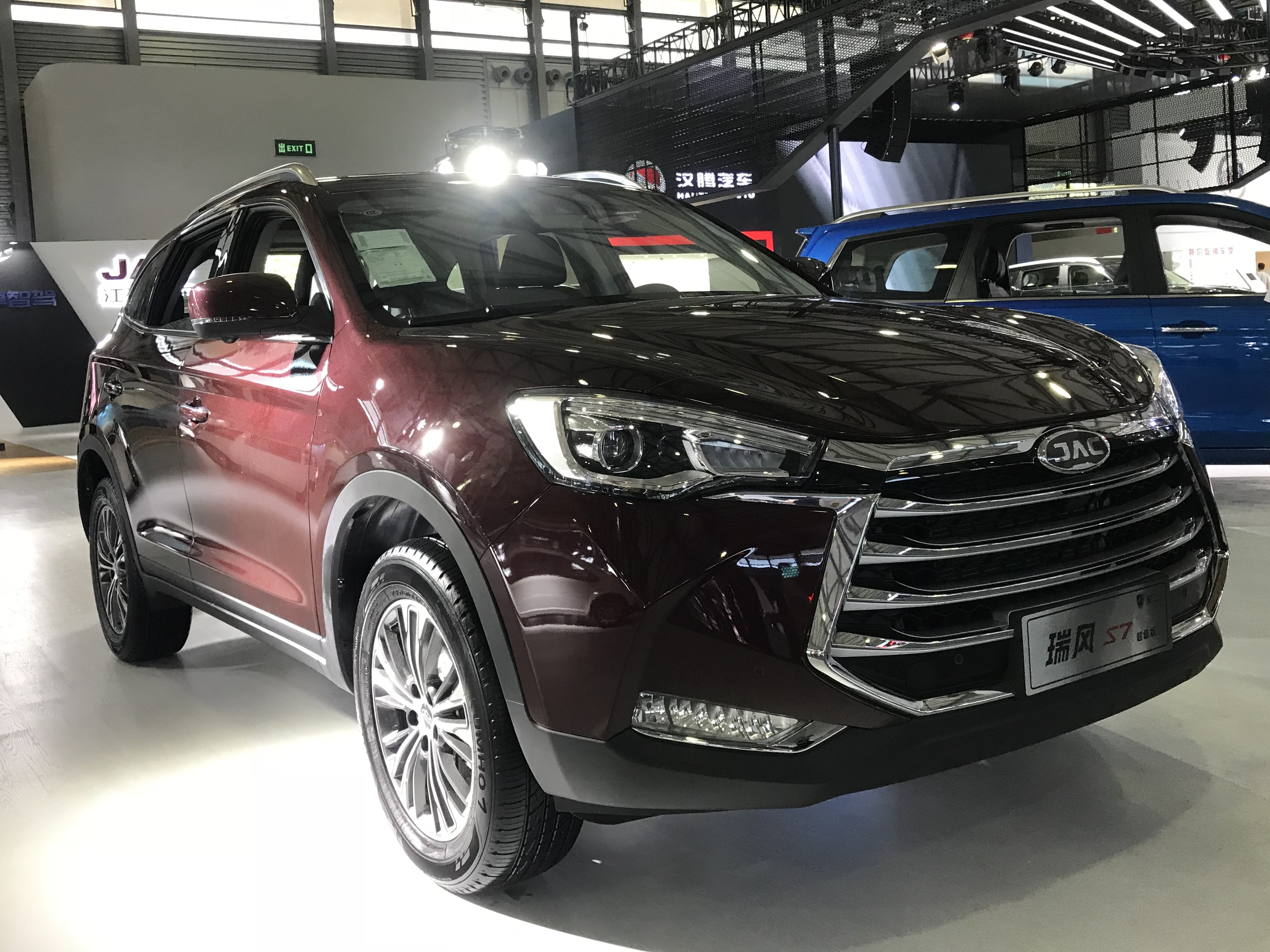
Refine S7 facelift front

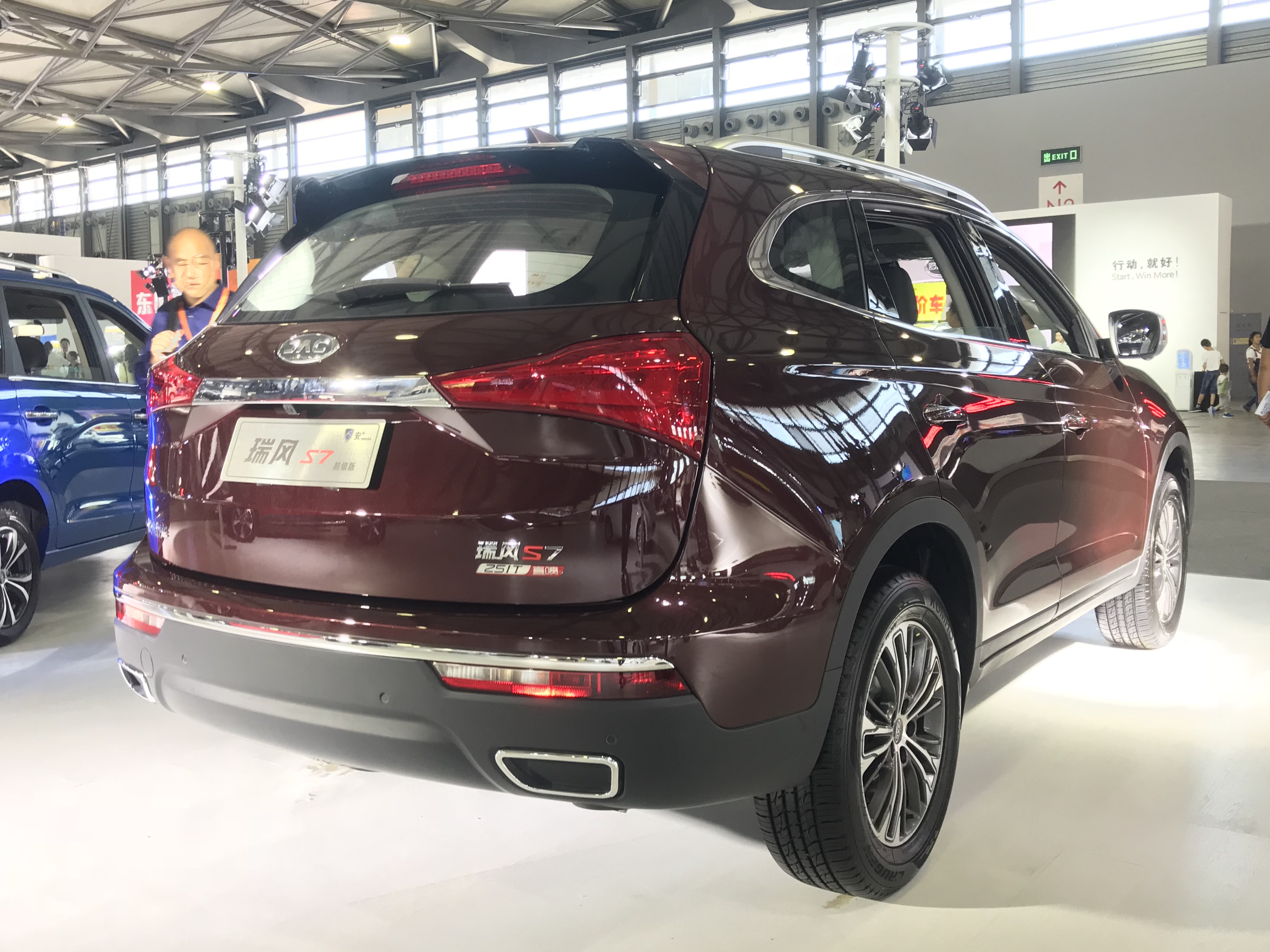
Refine S7 facelift rear

The Refine S7 was a mid-size crossover that was positioned above the compact Refine S5 crossover.

The engine options of the Refine S7 includes a 1.5L turbo putting out 174 hp (130 kW) and 251 N⋅m (185 lbf⋅ft) of torque and a 2.0L turbo producing 190 hp (142 kW) and 280 N⋅m (207 lbf⋅ft) of torque, with both engines available with a six-speed manual transmission or a six-speed DCT. The engine lineup of the Refine S7 is exactly the same as the Refine A60 sedan.

The Refine S7 is available in both five-seat and seven-seat versions. Pricing of the Refine S7 ranges from 109,800 yuan to 129,800 yuan. A facelift was launched in 2018 slightly altering the front grilles and bumper and changing the tail lamps to red.
