= JAC Binyue =

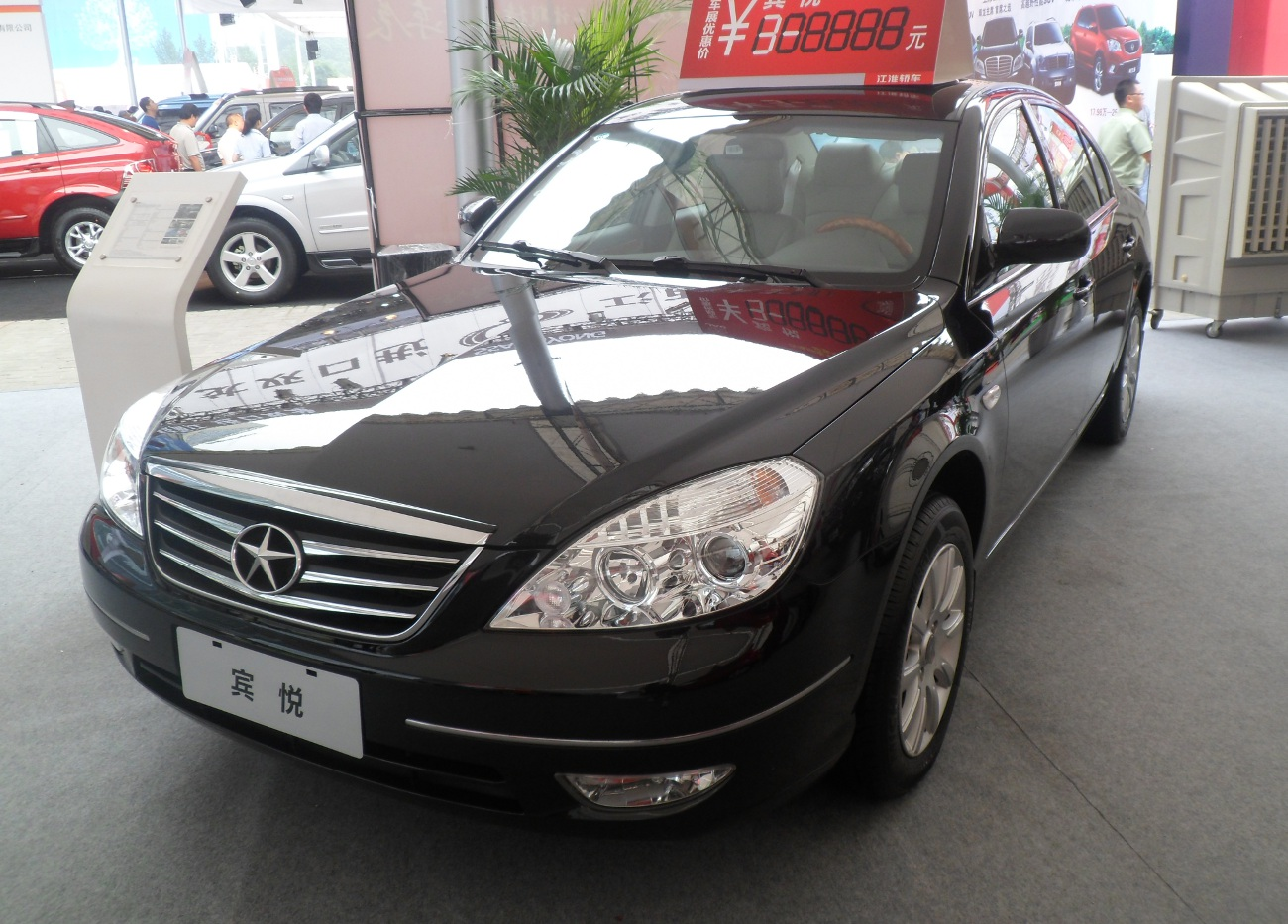

Overview
- Also called: JAC J7
- Production: 2008–2012

Powertrain
- Engine: 1.8 L HFC4GA4.C/HFC4GA5.C I4 (petrol); 2.0 L HFC4GA3.C I4 (petrol); 2.0 L 4G63 I4 (petrol)
- Transmission: 6-speed manual 4-speed automatic

Dimensions
- Wheelbase: 2,790 mm (110 in)
- Length: 4,865 mm (192 in)
- Width: 1,805 mm (71 in)
- Height: 1,450 mm (57 in)
- Curb weight: 1,460–1,540 kg (3,219–3,395 lb)

Chronology
- Successor: JAC Refine A60

The JAC Binyue (宾悦) or JAC J7 is a full-size sedan produced by JAC Motors of China.

== Overview ==
The exterior design is controversial as the rear end of the Binyue is heavily inspired by the Merecedes-Benz C-class W203. Originally launched as the JAC Binyue C20 with prices ranging from 88,800 yuan to 149,700 yuan, a facelift version was revealed in 2011 called the JAC Binyue C18 and was powered by a A new 1.8L engine replacing the old 2.0L engine. Original plans for the pricing after the facelift was from 95,900 yuan to 139,800 yuan, but the final prices after the facelift was from 91,800 yuan to 132,800 yuan.

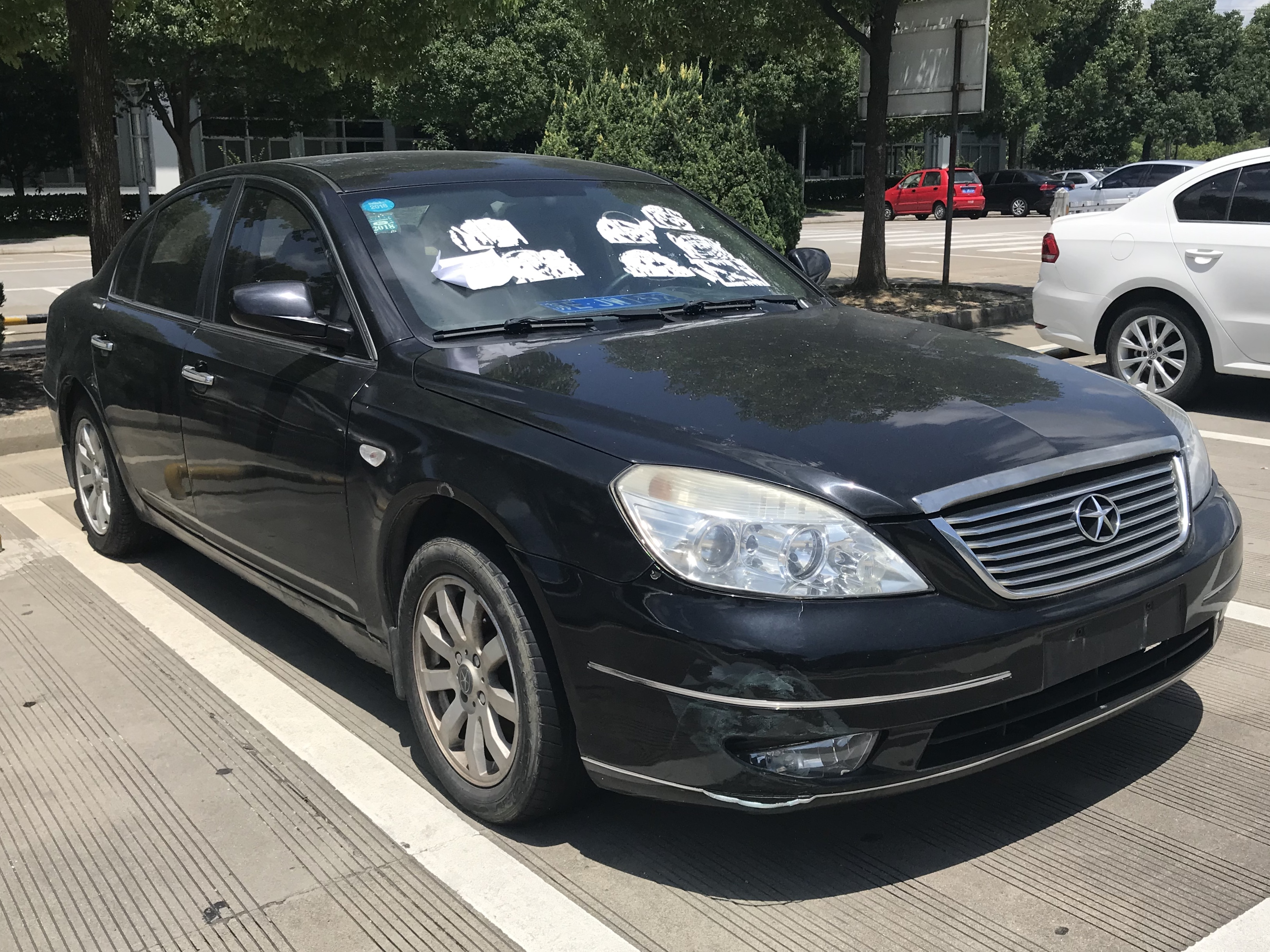
JAC Binyue C200 front

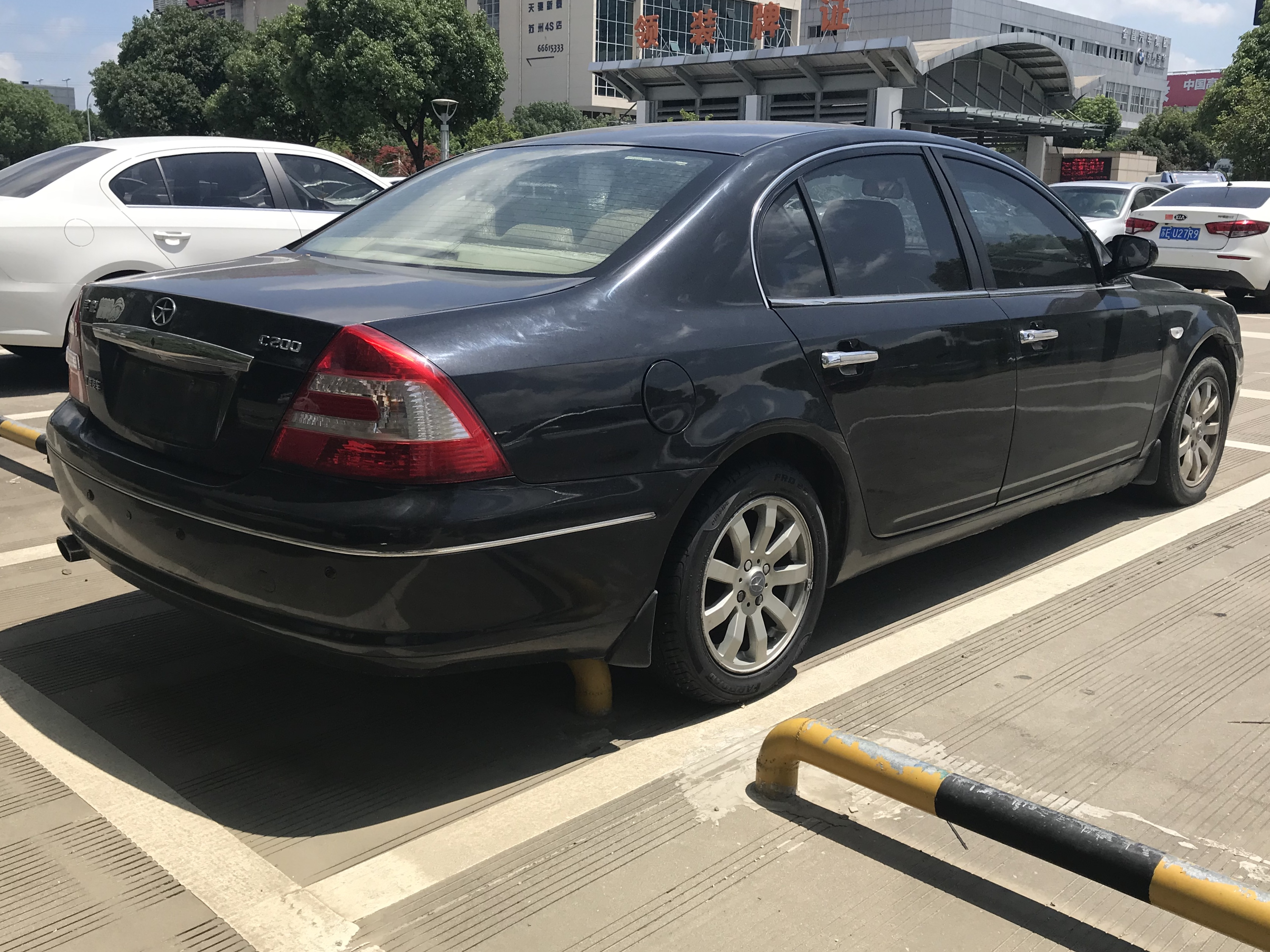
JAC Binyue C200 rear

== JAC HFC7200CL ==
A prototype based on the JAC Binyue code named the JAC HFC7200CL was revealed after the initial launch of the Binyue featuring a restyled front fascia. Plans of the production JAC HFC7200CL was revealed as of October 2011, but the car remains a prototype.
