= Sehol X6 =

Compact crossover vehicle made by JAC Motors

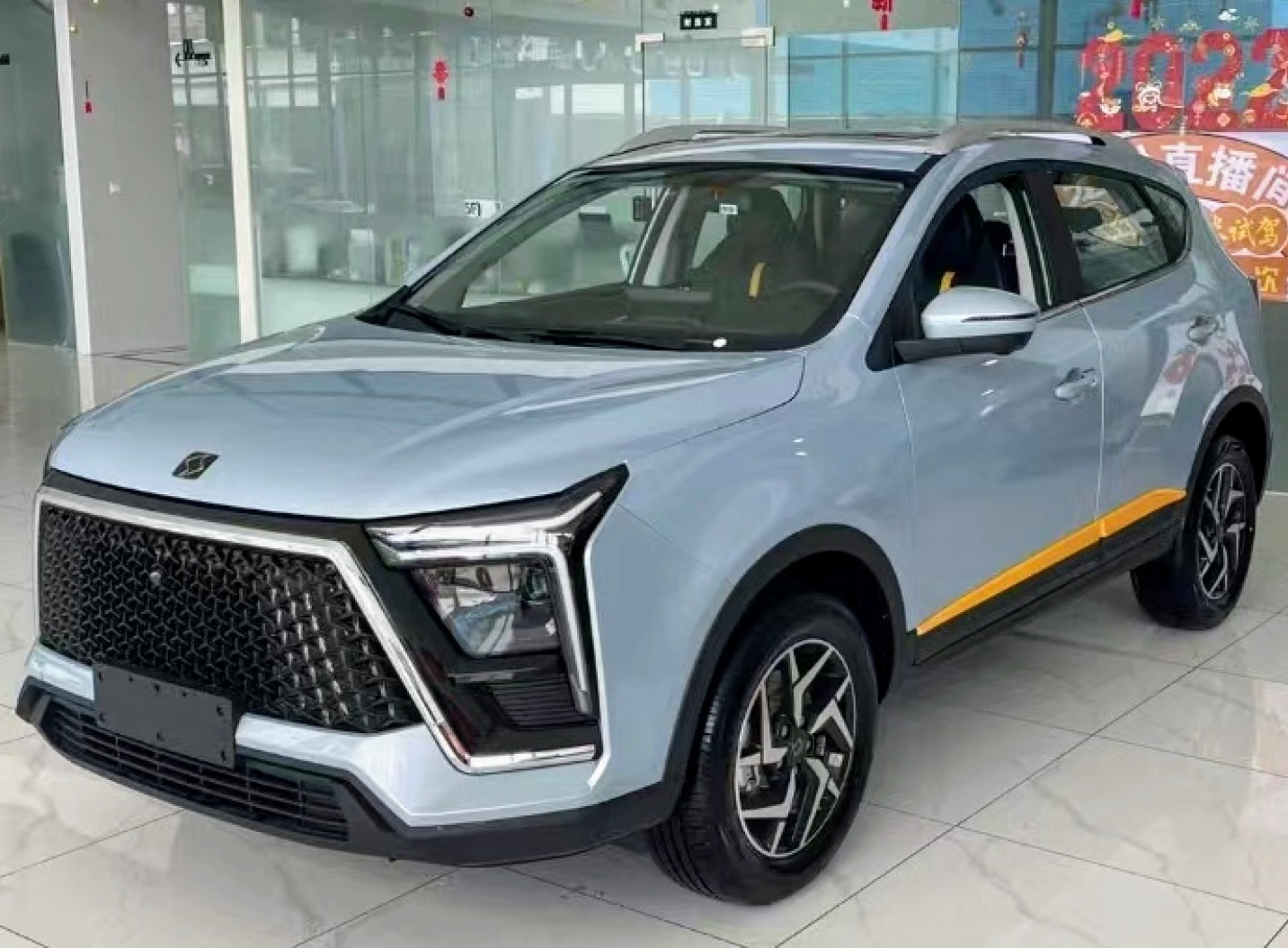

Overview
- Manufacturer: Sehol (JAC Motors)
- Also called: JAC JS5; KMC X5 (Iran); Moskvitch 5 (Russia)
- Production: 2022–present
- Assembly: China: Hefei; Iran: Bam (KMC)

Body and chassis
- Class: Compact crossover SUV (C)
- Body style: 5-door SUV
- Related: JAC Refine S5

Powertrain
- Engine: Petrol: 1.5 L turbo I4
- Power output: 112 kW (150 hp; 152 PS)

Dimensions
- Wheelbase: 2,660 mm (104.7 in)
- Length: 4,505 mm (177.4 in)
- Width: 1,850 mm (72.8 in)
- Height: 1,698 mm (66.9 in)

Chronology
- Predecessor: JAC Refine S5

The Sehol X6 is a compact crossover SUV produced by JAC Motors under the Sehol brand. The Sehol X6 was originally planned to be named the Sehol X5 during early development, and was based on the same platform as the JAC Refine S5 while being updated for the Sehol brand featuring a completely different design. Being also a compact crossover, the Sehol X6 was positioned lower than the Sehol QX or globally the JAC JS6 and above the Sehol X4.

== Overview ==
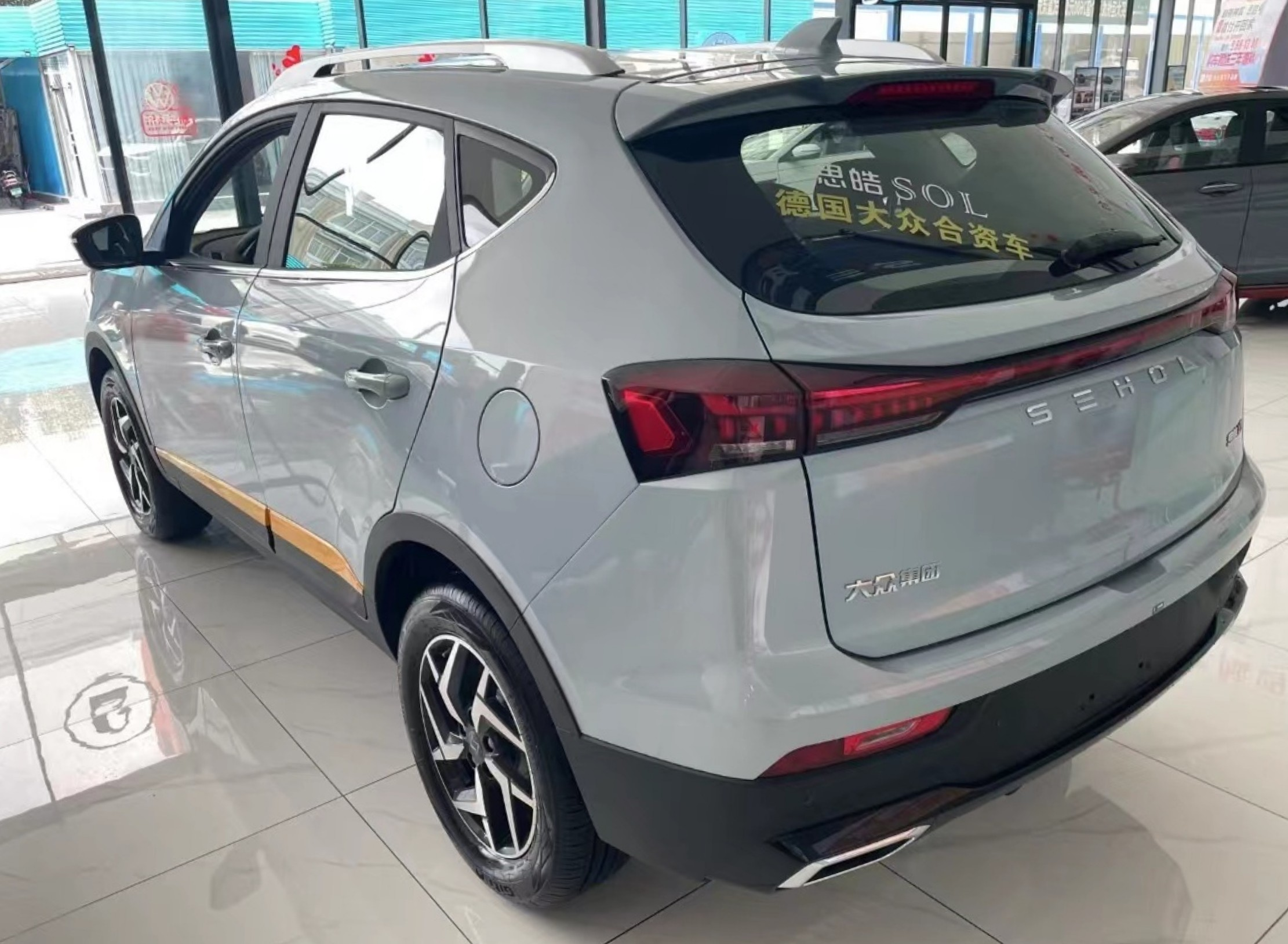
Sehol X6 rear

Despite press images being released in late 2021, the Sehol X6 was officially unveiled to the Mainland Chinese market for the 2022 Beijing Auto Show. Just like the majority of Sehol's product lineup at the time, the Sehol X6 is heavily based on previous JAC vehicles and features a front fascia design that stands out from the rest of the Sehol vehicle range.

=== Powertrain ===
The Sehol X6 is equipped with a 1.5 liter four-cylinder turbocharged engine shared with the Sehol X4. The maximum power is 150 horsepower and the peak torque is 210 Nm.
