= JAC X8 =

Mid-size crossover SUV made by JAC Motors

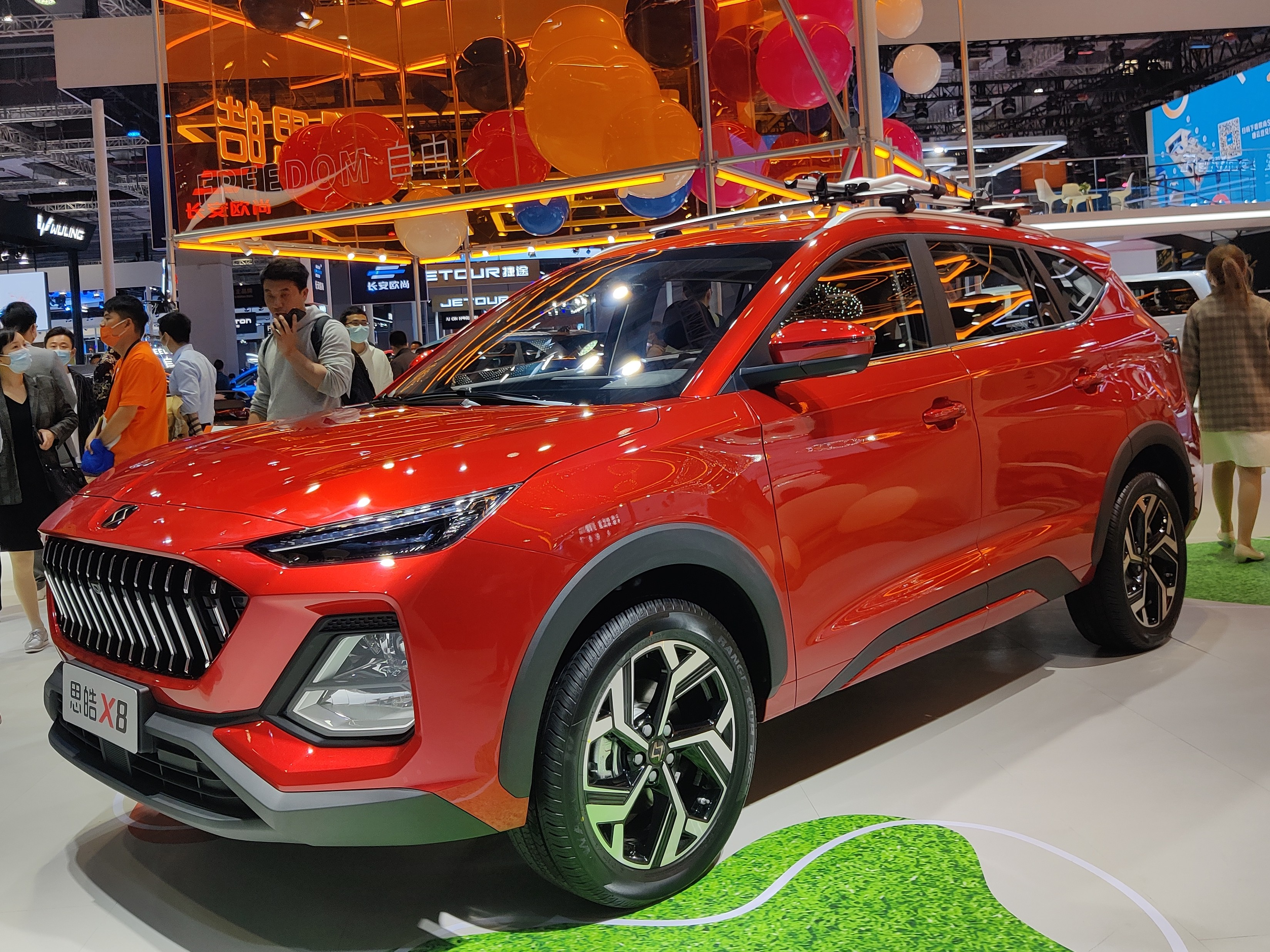

Overview
- Manufacturer: Sehol (JAC Motors)
- Also called: JAC JS8; JAC Jiayue X8; JAC Sei 7 Pro (Mexico); JAC 8 (Mexico); EVO 7 (Italy); Moskvitch 8 (Russia)
- Production: 2020–present
- Assembly: China: Hefei; Mexico: Ciudad Sahagún; Russia: Moscow (Moskvitch)

Body and chassis
- Class: Mid-size crossover SUV
- Body style: 5-door SUV
- Related: Sehol X7

Powertrain
- Engine: Petrol: 1.5 L HFC4GC1.6E turbo I4; Petrol plug-in hybrid: 1.5 L H15RT turbo I4
- Electric motor: 150 kW Permanent magnet synchronous (PHEV)
- Power output: 135 kW (184 hp; 187 PS)
- Transmission: 6-speed manual 6-speed DCT automatic DHT (PHEV)
- Battery: 19.01 kWh LFP CALB (PHEV)

Dimensions
- Wheelbase: 2,830 mm (111.4 in)
- Length: 4,815 mm (189.6 in); 4,825 mm (190.0 in) (X8 Plus)
- Width: 1,870 mm (73.6 in)
- Height: 1,758 mm (69.2 in)
- Curb weight: 1,560–1,620 kg (3,439–3,571 lb)

The JAC X8 (Chinese: 江淮X8, previously called Sehol X8) is a mid-size crossover SUV produced by JAC Motors.

Originally it is called the JAC Jiayue X8, the crossover SUV was moved under the Sol brand which was later renamed to Sehol.

== Overview ==
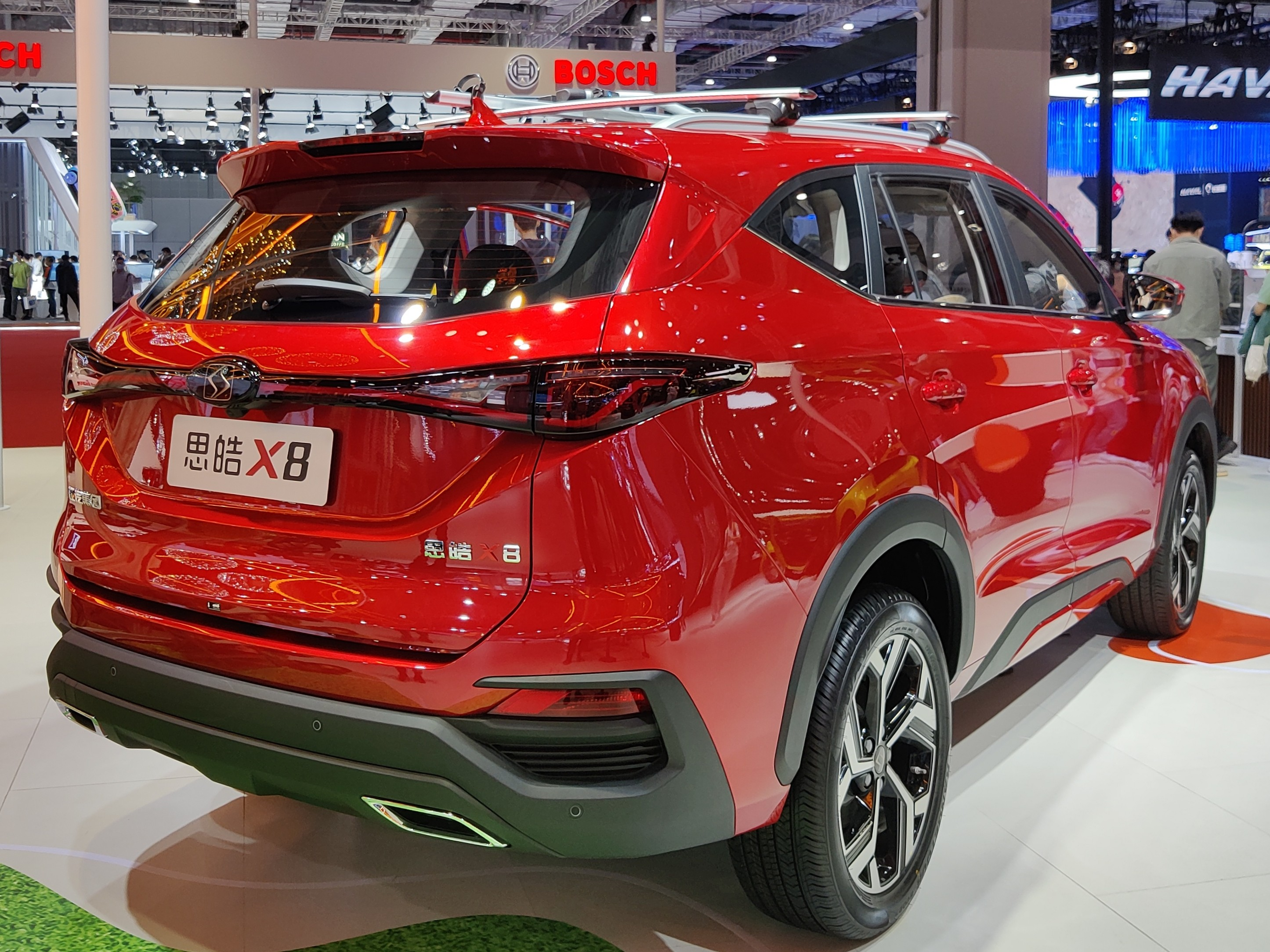
Rear of the Sehol X8

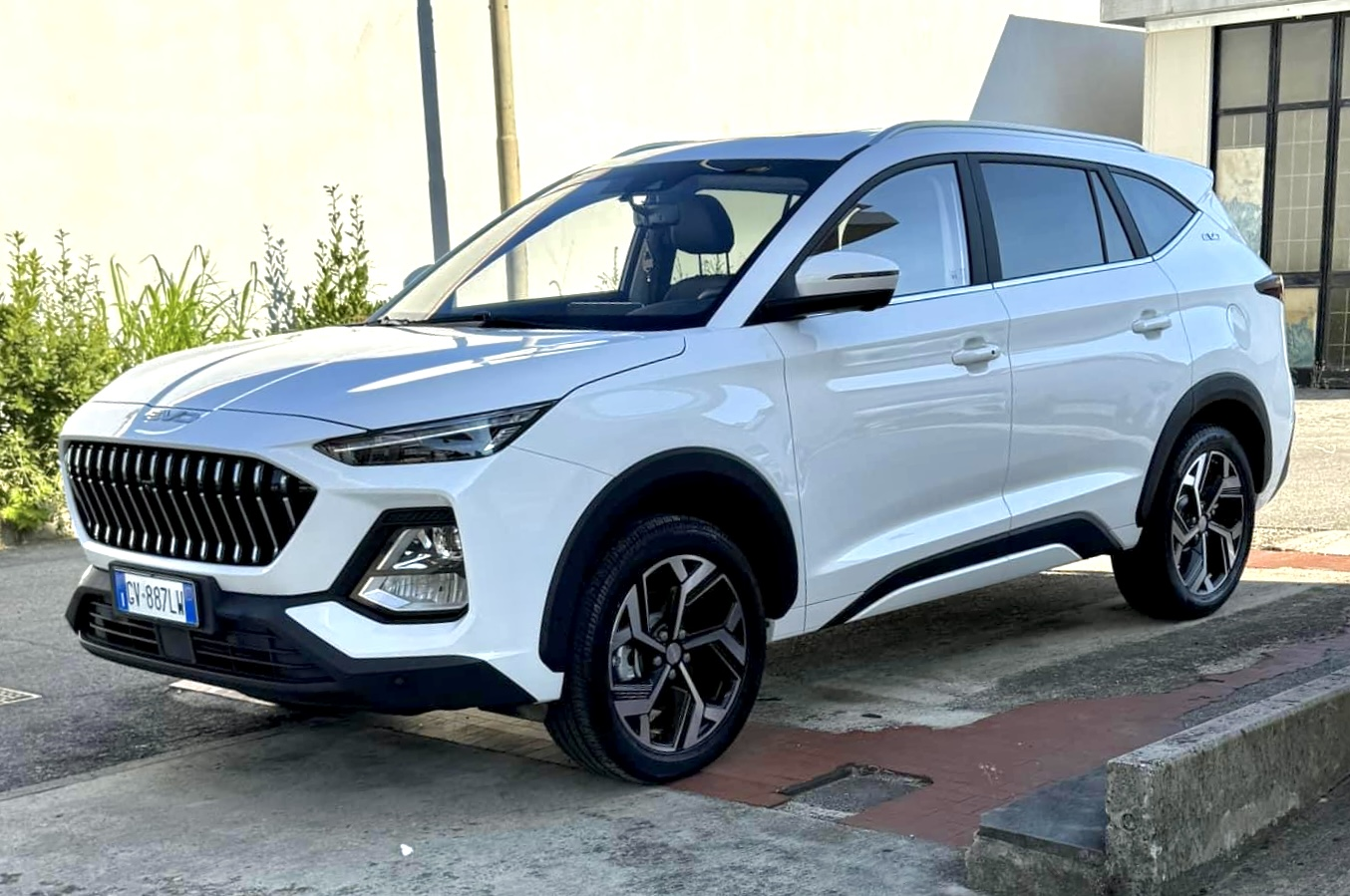
EVO 7

The X8 was announced in May 2020. It was officially presented at the Chengdu Auto Show in July 2020. The five, six or seven-seater vehicle has been sold on the Chinese domestic market since October 2020.

The X8 is powered by a turbocharged 1.5-liter four-cylinder engine with 135 kW (184 hp). It has a 6-speed manual transmission as standard, a 6-speed dual clutch transmission is available at an additional cost.

== Sehol X8 Plus ==
The Sehol X8 Plus was launched in July 2022 as the slightly larger and more premium variant of the Sehol X8 with redesigned front and rear end adding 10 mm to the full vehicle length. The Sehol X8 Plus is offered as standard with six seat and seven seat versions while powertrain remains to be the same as the standard Sehol X8.

In October 2023, the vehicle was rebranded as the JAC X8 Plus, officially transitioning to the JAC marque and retiring the Sehol brand. The new stylized JAC logo is set to be adopted across the manufacturer's entire lineup of sedans and SUVs.

=== X8 E-Plus (PHEV) ===
The JAC X8 E-Plus (江淮X8E家) is the plug-in hybrid version launched on the Chinese market in September 2024. It features a hybrid system consisting of a 1.5 Turbo H15RT four-cylinder Miller-cycle thermal engine, delivering 112 kW (152 hp) and a maximum torque of 210 Nm, paired with a 150 kW (204 hp) permanent magnet electric motor. It is equipped with a DHT automatic transmission and a 19.01 kWh LFP battery produced by CALB, providing an all-electric range of 110 km (CLTC cycle).

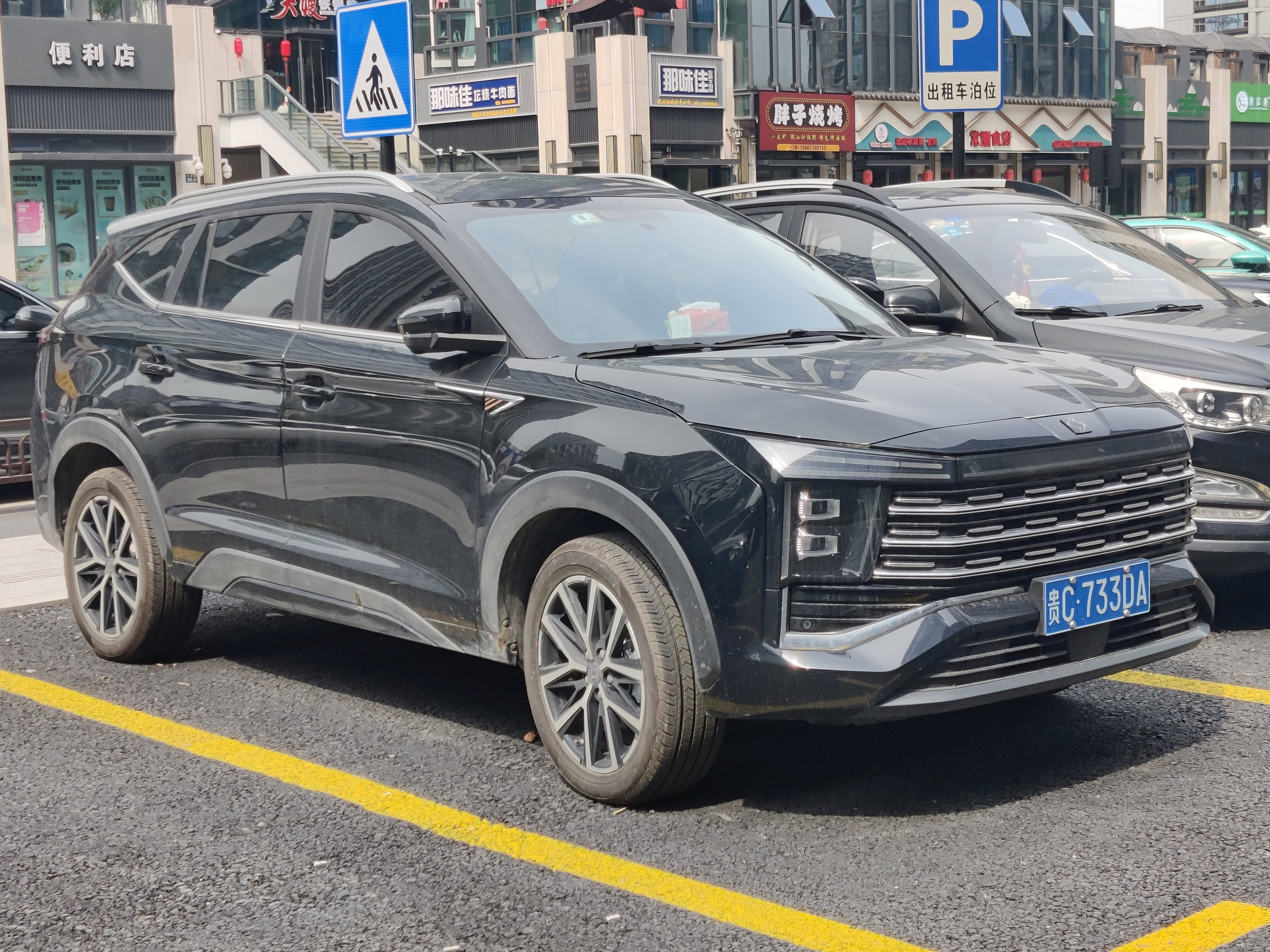
Sehol X8 Plus front

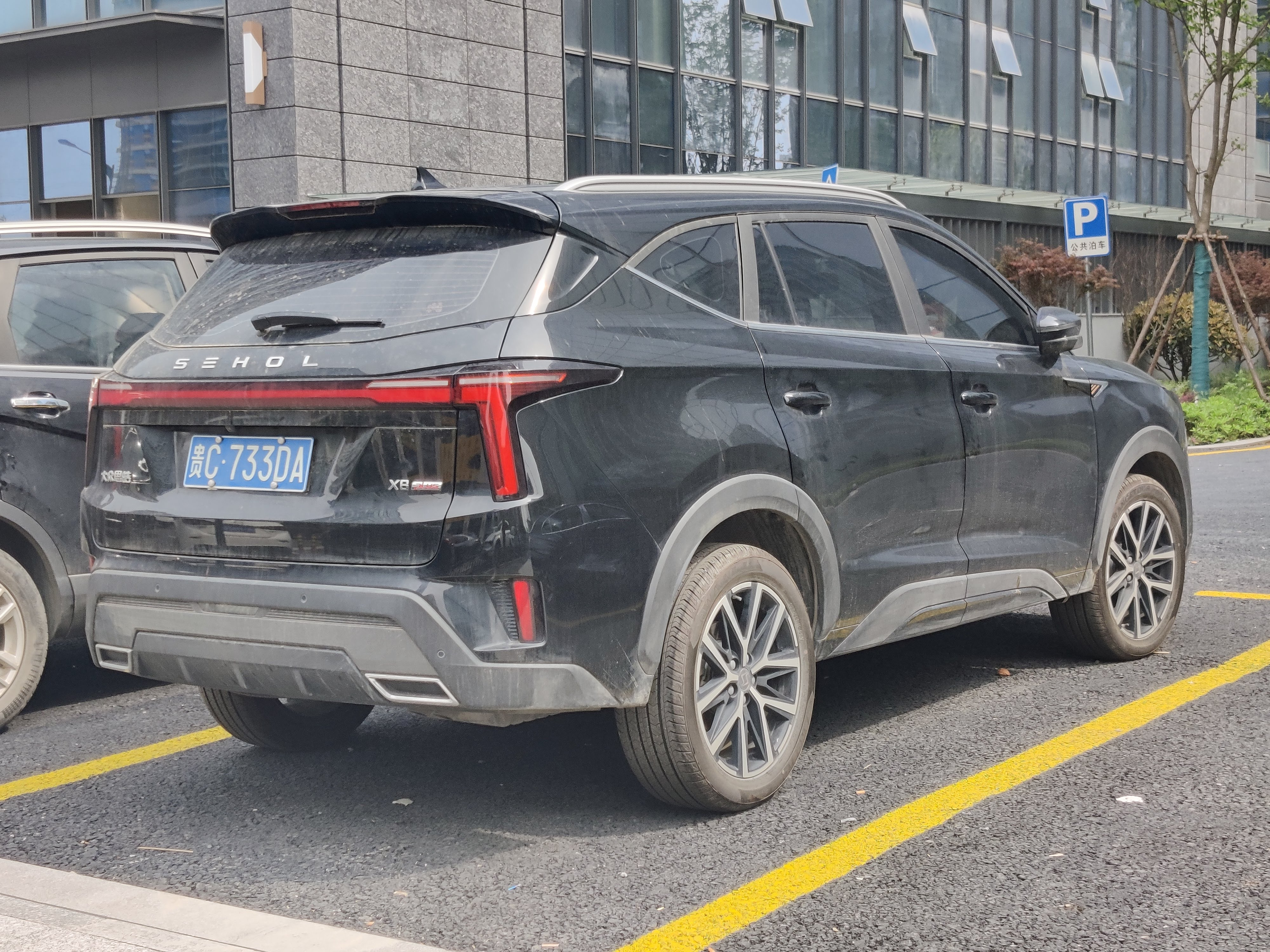
Sehol X8 Plus rear

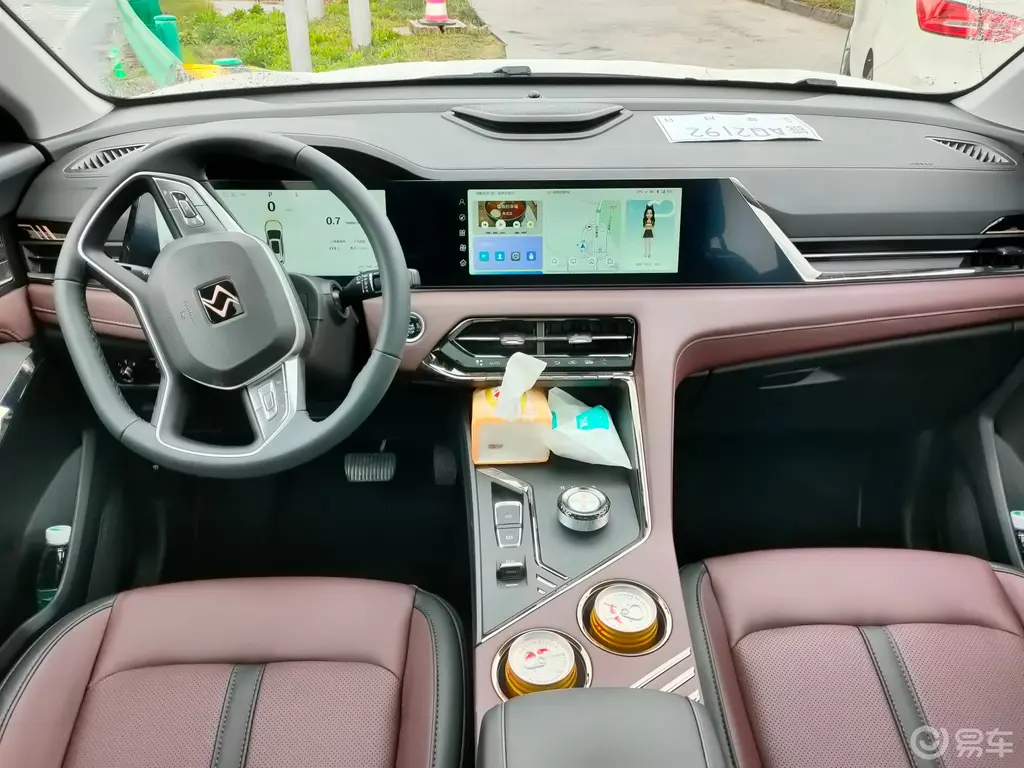
Sehol X8 Plus interior

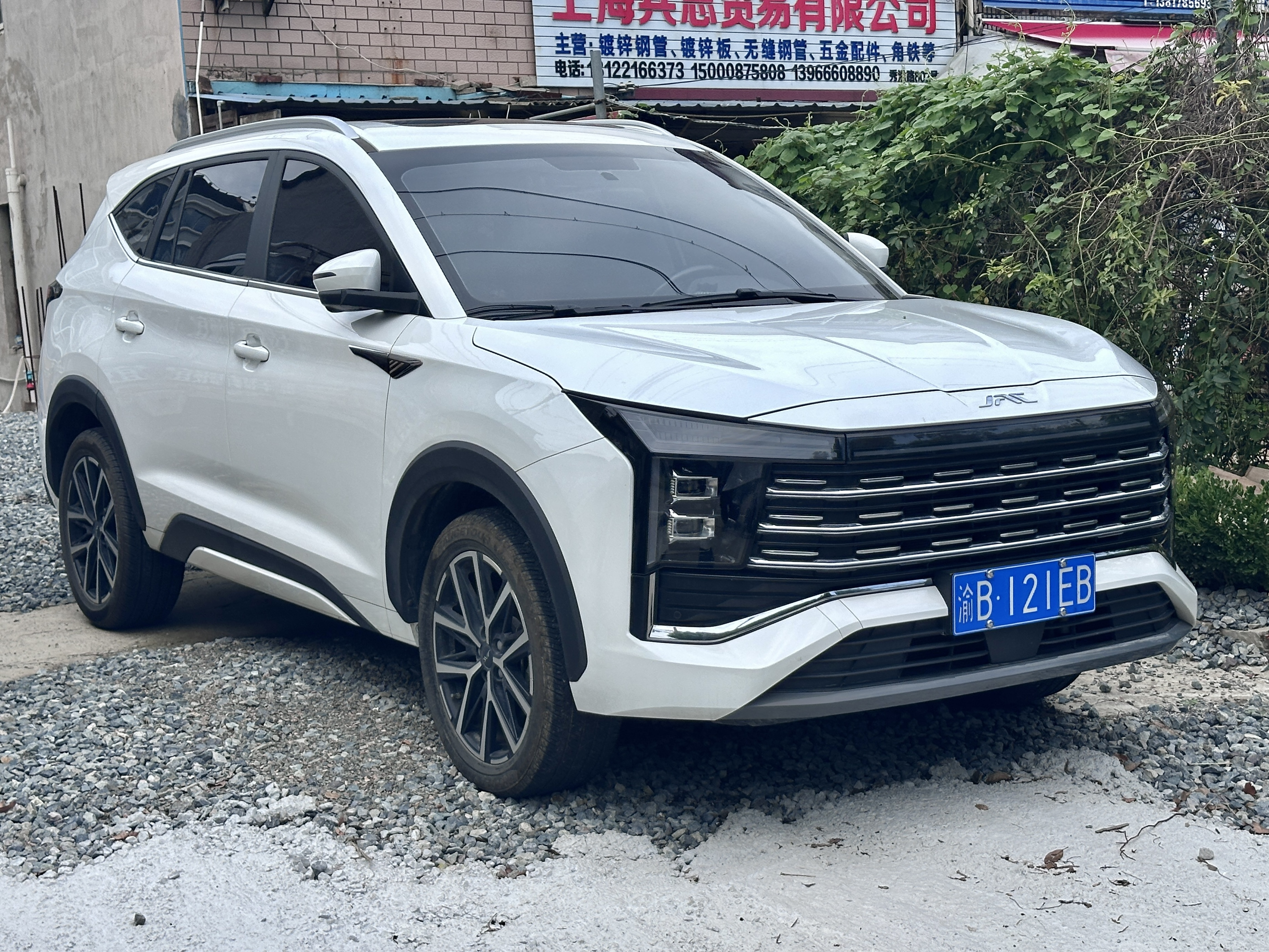
JAC X8 Plus front

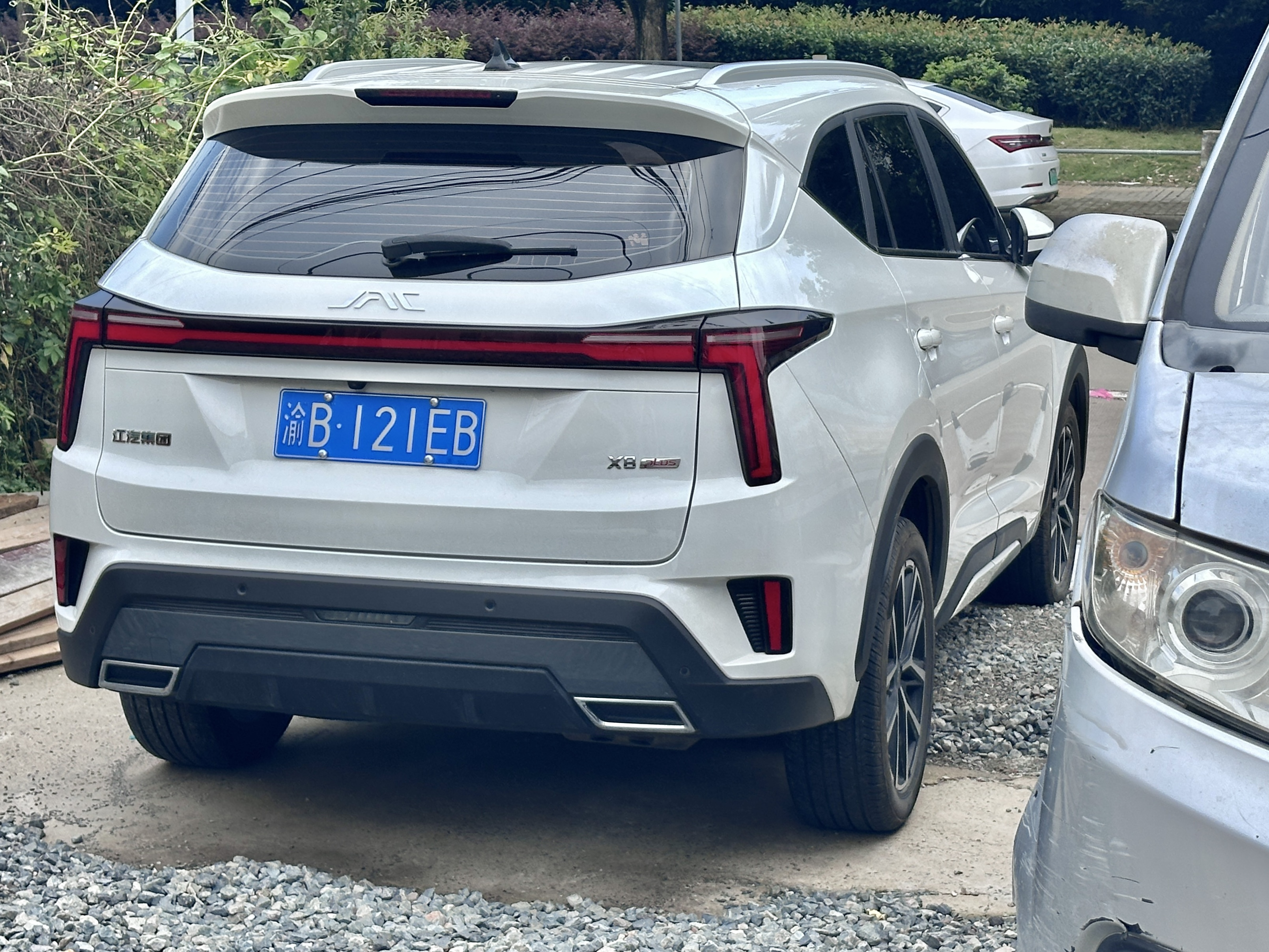
JAC X8 Plus rear

== Sales ==
Year	China
2024	1,017
2025	610
