= JAC Refine A60 =

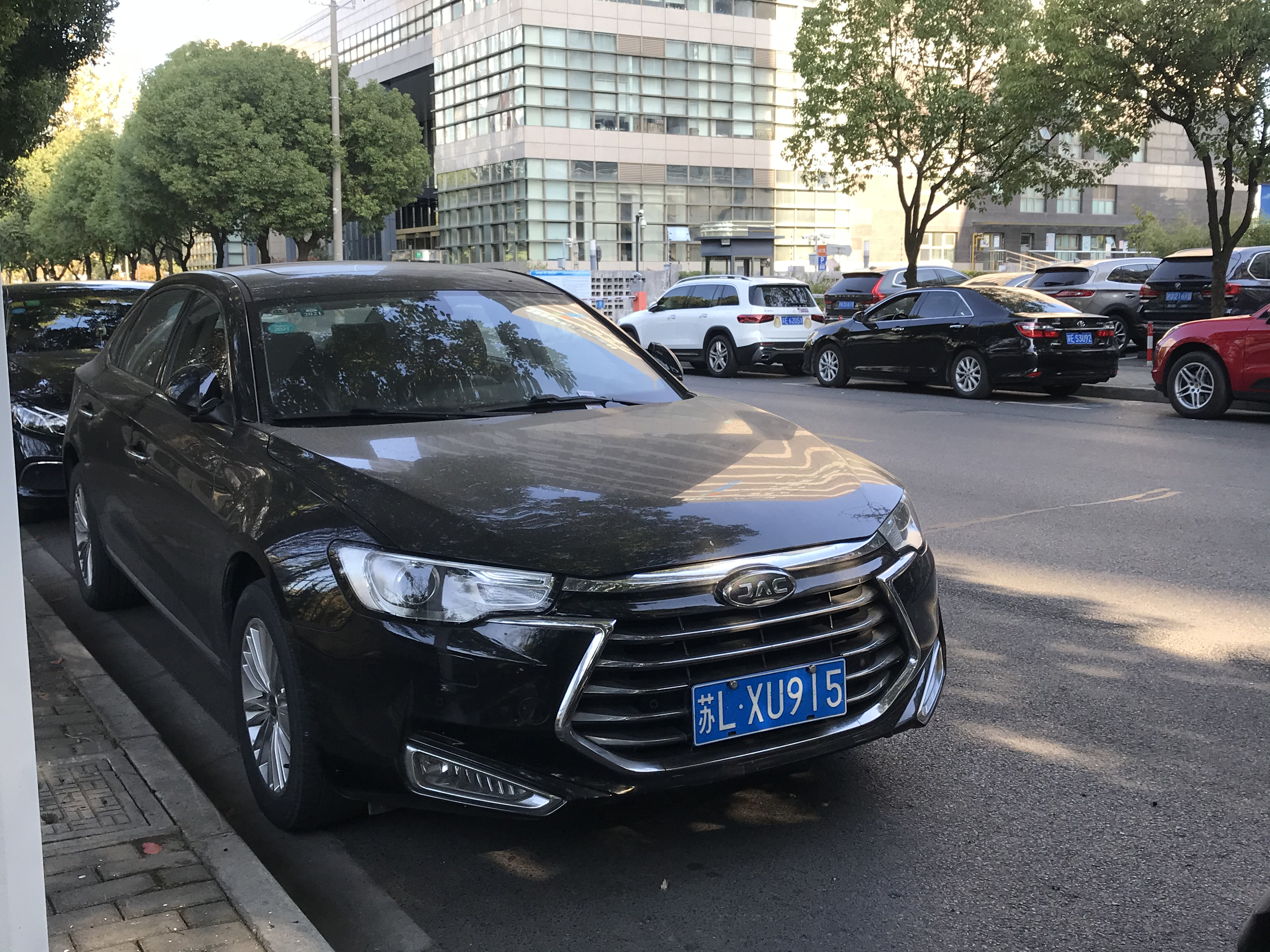

Overview
- Manufacturer: JAC Motors
- Also called: Refine A6
- Production: 2015–2020
- Model years: 2016–2020
- Assembly: China: Changchun

Body and chassis
- Body style: 4-door sedan
- Related: JAC Refine S7

Powertrain
- Engine: Petrol: 1.5 L HFC4GC1.6D I4 turbo; 2.0 L I4 turbo
- Transmission: 6-speed manual; 6-speed DCT
- Electric range: 405–510 km (252–317 mi) (iEVA60)

Dimensions
- Wheelbase: 2,915 mm (114.8 in)
- Length: 4,995 mm (196.7 in)
- Width: 1,865 mm (73.4 in)
- Height: 1,503 mm (59.2 in)
- Curb weight: 3,726–4,178 lb (1,690.1–1,895.1 kg)

Chronology
- Predecessor: JAC J7

The JAC Refine A60 (瑞风A60) is a full-size sedan made by the Chinese automaker JAC. The Refine A60 is the largest sedan of the JAC Refine series, and was seen as the series' flagship.

== JAC Refine A6 concept (2014) ==
The Refine A6 (瑞风A6) concept was unveiled in 2014 Beijing Auto Show. The Refine A6 concept is essentially the pre-production concept previewing the Refine A60. The front grille and headlights design of the A60 concept was being inspired by the Audi A6.

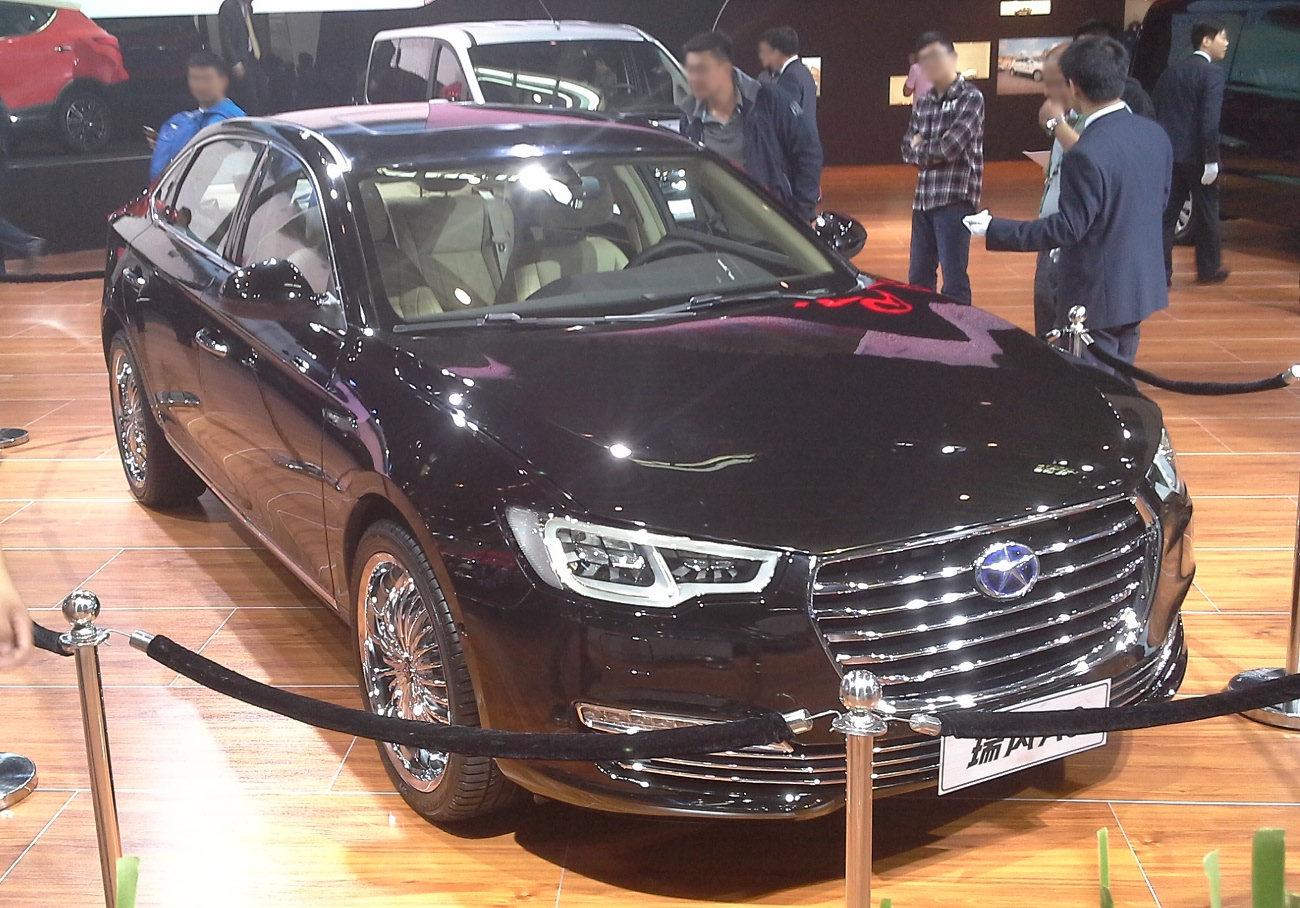
JAC Refine A6 Concept front

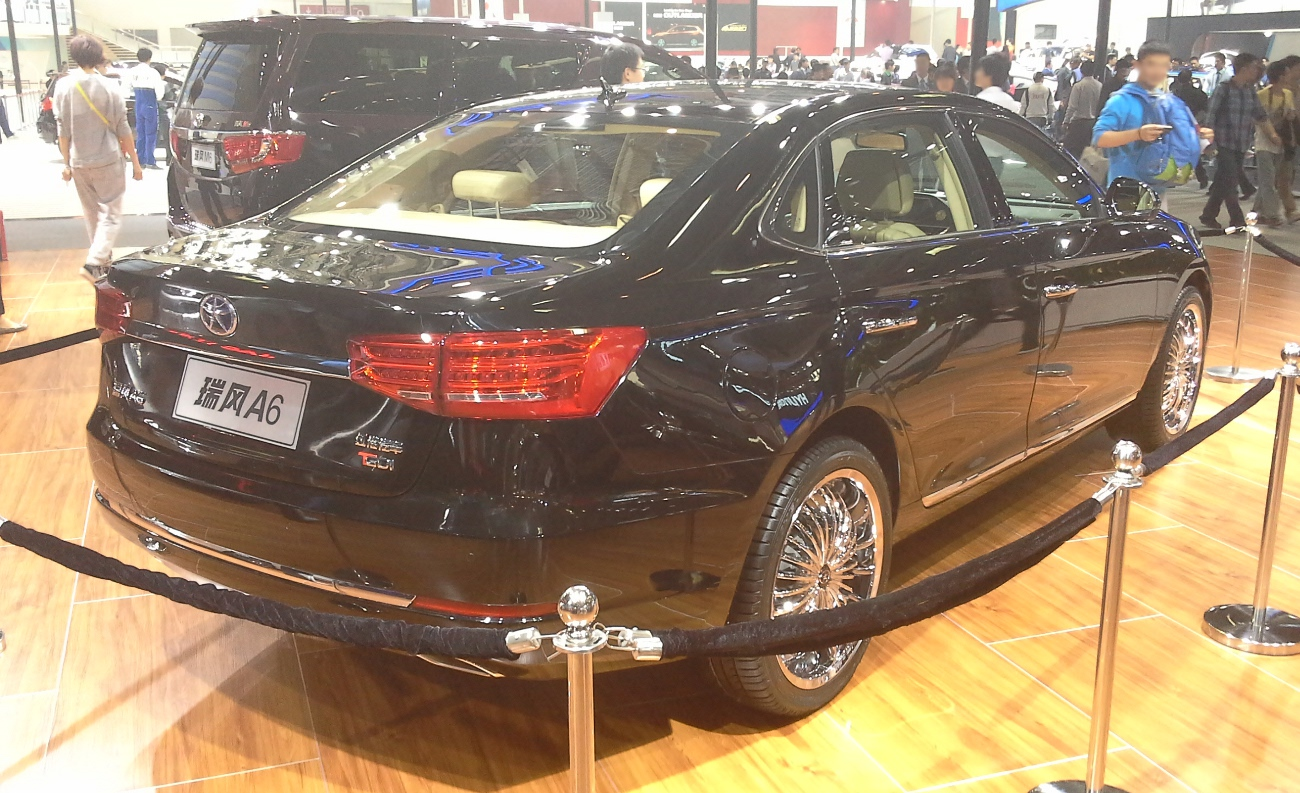
JAC Refine A6 Concept rear

== JAC Refine A60 (2016) ==
JAC Refine A60 (瑞风A60) was unveiled 2015 Shanghai Auto Show, followed by 2015 Guangzhou Auto Show.

China model was set to go on sale in Q1 2016, but was delayed to November 2016. Early model included 1.5 l turbo (rated 174 hp (130 kW; 176 PS)/251 N⋅m (185 lb⋅ft)) engine, with 2.0 turbo rated (190 hp (142 kW; 193 PS)/280 N⋅m (207 lb⋅ft)) model available later. Prices of the Refine A60 ranges from 139,500 yuan to 179,500 yuan.

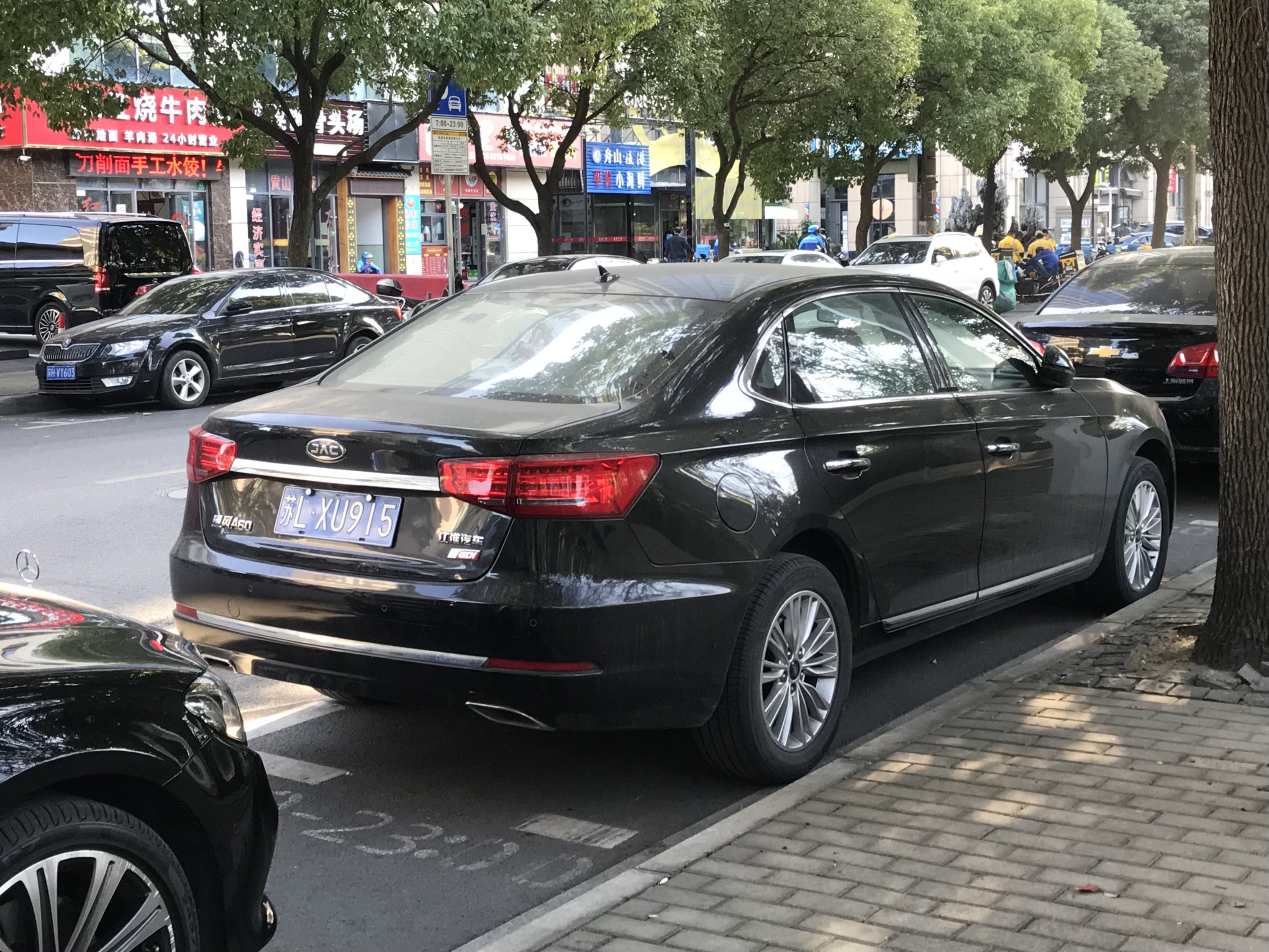
JAC Refine A60 rear

=== Engines and transmission ===
There were two engines available, including a 1.5-liter turbocharged petrol engine producing 174 hp (130 kW; 176 PS) and 251 N⋅m (185 lb⋅ft), and a 2.0-liter turbo petrol engine producing 190 hp (142 kW; 193 PS) and 280 N⋅m (207 lb⋅ft). Both engines was mated to either a six-speed manual transmission or a six-speed DCT.

== JAC iEVA60 ==
JAC iEVA60 (江淮iEVA60) is based on the Refine A60 body with additional batteries and an electric motor. According to JAC official numbers likely on the NEDC cycle, the maximum range of the iEVA60 is 405 to 510 kilometres (252 to 317 mi). The prototype vehicle was unveiled in 2018 Guangzhou Auto Show.

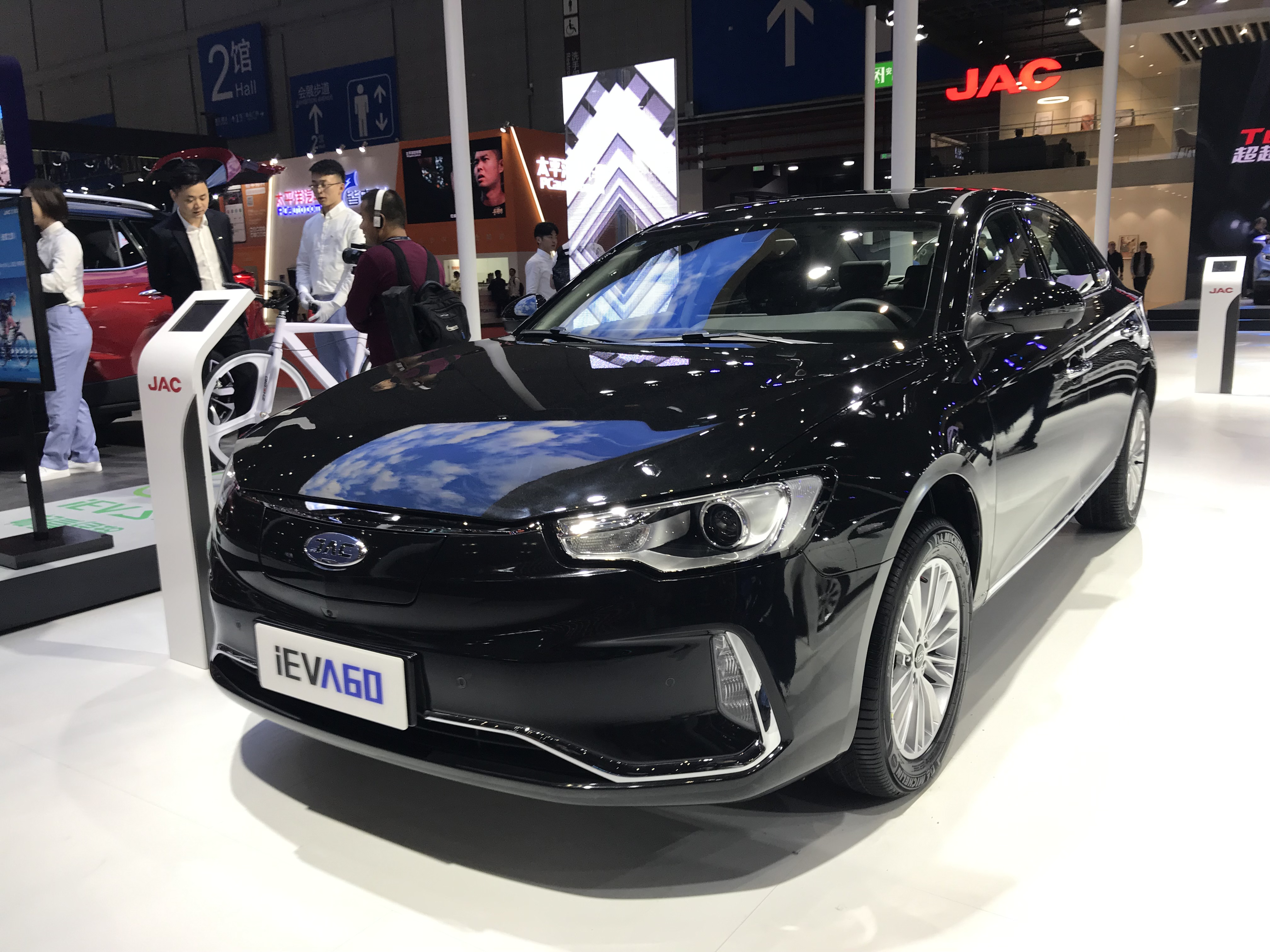
JAC iEVA60 in 2019 Auto Shanghai

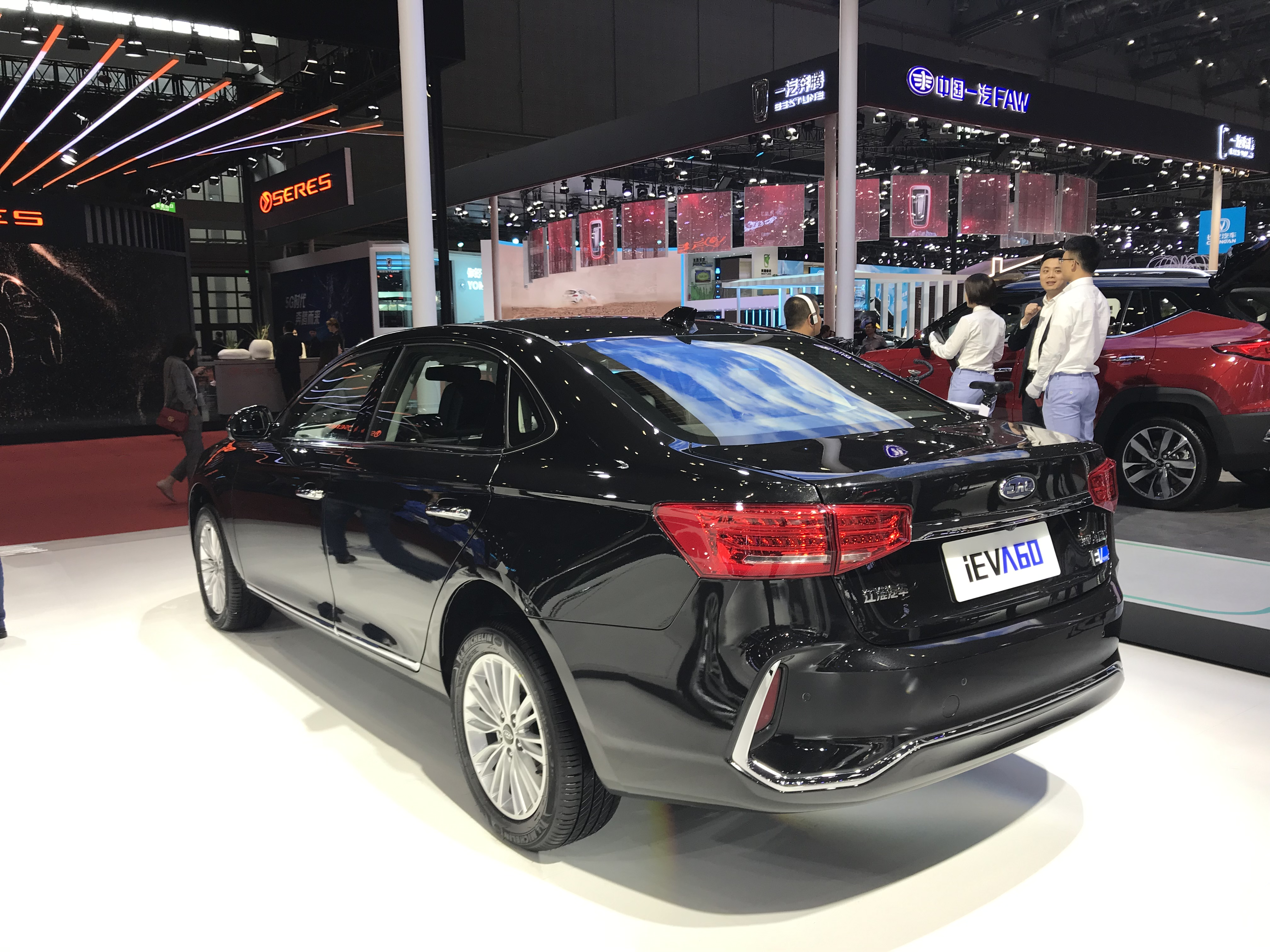
JAC iEVA60 in 2019 Auto Shanghai
