= Sehol X7 =

Mid-sized passenger vehicle

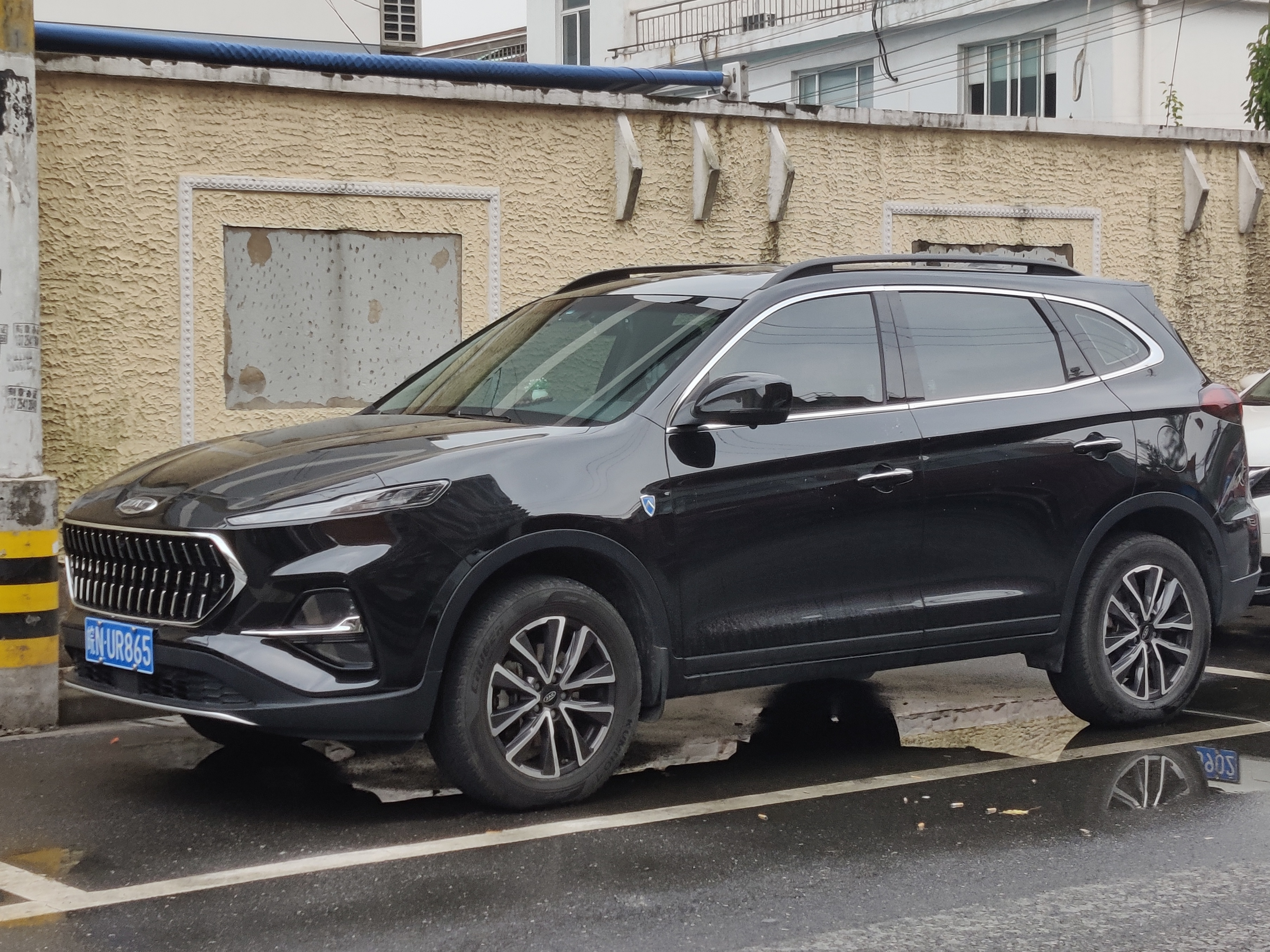
- Jiayue X7

Overview
- Manufacturer: Sehol (JAC Motors)
- Also called: JAC Jiayue X7; JAC JS7; KMC K7 (Iran)
- Production: 2020–present
- Model years: 2020–present
- Assembly: China: Hefei; Iran: Bam (KMC)

Body and chassis
- Class: Mid-size crossover SUV
- Body style: 5-door SUV
- Platform: Jianghuai SS
- Related: JAC Refine S7; Sehol X8

Powertrain
- Engine: Petrol: 1.5 L turbo I4; 2.0 L turbo I4
- Power output: 130 kW (174 hp; 176 PS) (1.5 L turbo); 142 kW (190 hp; 193 PS) (2.0 L turbo)
- Transmission: 6-speed dual-clutch

Dimensions
- Wheelbase: 2,750 mm (108.3 in)
- Length: 4,776 mm (188.0 in)
- Width: 1,900 mm (74.8 in)
- Height: 1,760 mm (69.3 in)
- Curb weight: 1,755 kg (3,869 lb)

Chronology
- Predecessor: JAC Refine S7

The Sehol X7 or previously the Sol X7 or Jiayue X7 is a mid-size crossover SUV that was produced by JAC Motors under the Sehol brand and Jiayue brand respectively. Originally it was launched as the Jiayue X7 in 2020, the crossover is essentially an extensive facelift of the Refine S7. By October 2020, the crossover was rebadged as the Sol X7. The Sol X7 and Jiayue X7 were sold alongside each other for a brief period before the Jiayue brand was discontinued. As of 2021, the Sol vehicles were badged as Sehol.

It is also marketed in Iran as the KMC K7.

== Overview ==
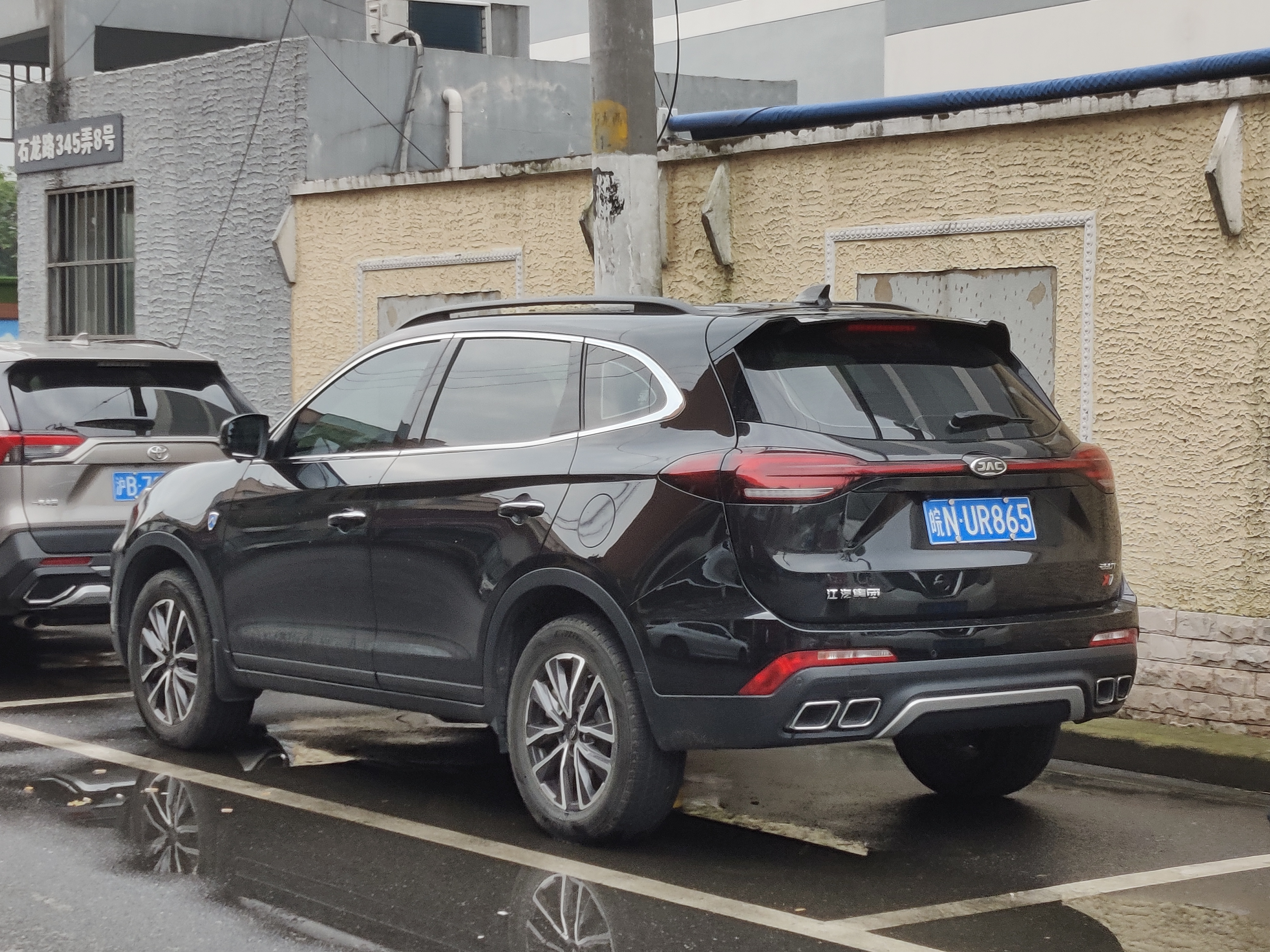
JAC Jiayue X7 rear

The Sol X7 or Jiayue X7 is a mid-size crossover that was positioned above the compact JAC Jiayue X4 crossover in the Jiayue product series. Despite the model essentially being an extensive facelift of its predecessor, the Refine S7, the Jiayue X7 is the first crossover product of the JAC passenger car layout in the 3.0 era according to officials.

=== Specifications ===
The engine options of the Jiayue X7 includes a 1.5 liter turbo putting out 174 hp (130 kW) (128kW) and 251 N⋅m (185 lbf⋅ft) of torque and a 2.0L turbo producing 190 hp (142 kW) and 280 N⋅m (207 lbf⋅ft) of torque, with the engine mated to a six-speed DCT. The top speed of the Jiayue X7 is 160 km/h. The Jiayue X7 price ranges from 89,800 to 119,800 yuan (~US$12,696 – US$16,938) for the Chinese market.

The Jiayue X7 is only available in five-seat versions at launch, and is equipped with the updated J-Link intelligent car networking system, with the center floating LCD screen and the full LCD instrument panel being 12.3 inches. The screen also integrates iflytek car voice 3.5 system and APP remote control, built-in car karaoke, Gaode maps, and 360-degree panoramic images and linked to a panoramic driving recorder. The JAC Jiayue X7 comes standard with 14 electronic stability systems and TESS flat tire emergency safety systems. Higher trim models of the Jiayue X7 are also equipped with LDWS lane departure warning systems and AEB automatic emergency brakes.
