= JAC Rein =

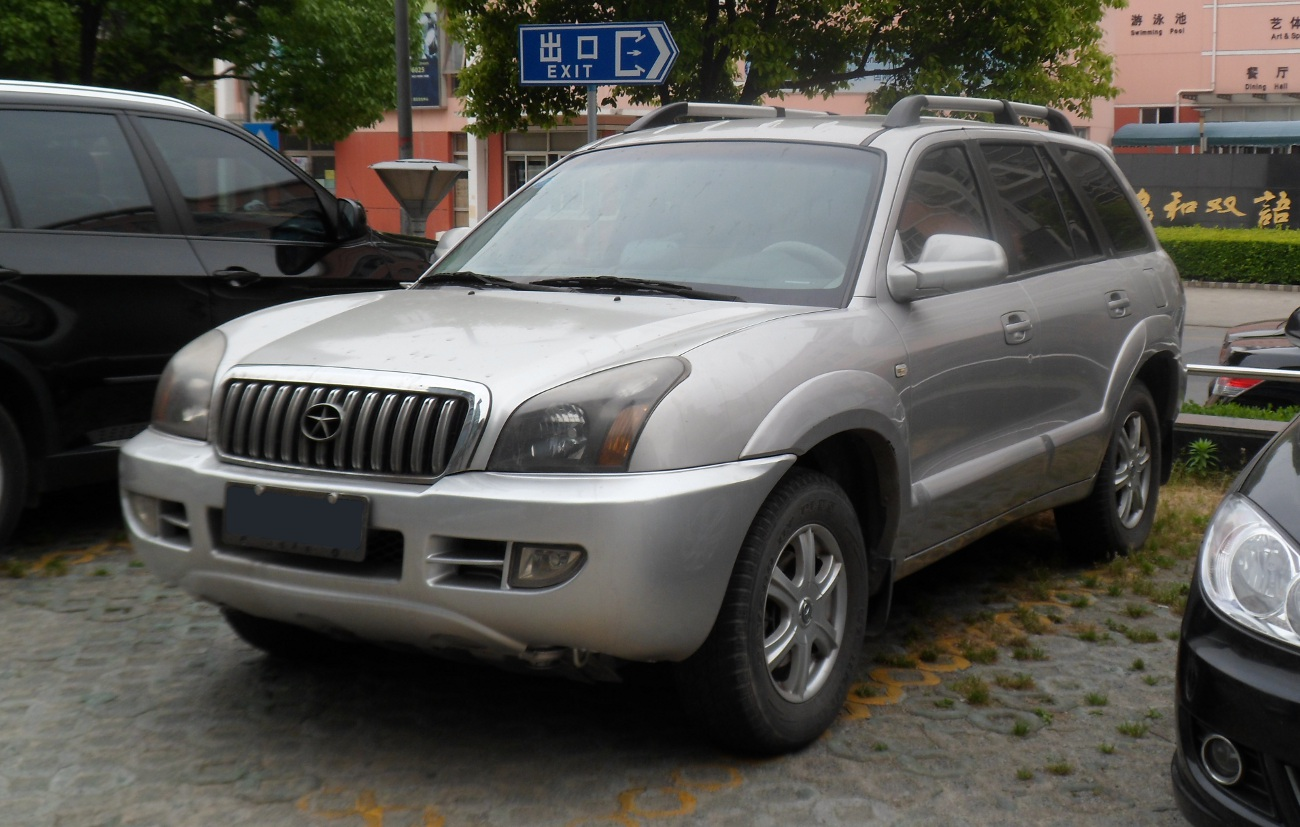

Overview
- Also called: JAC Eagle
- Production: 2007–2013
- Model years: 2007–2013

Body and chassis
- Platform: Hyundai-Kia Y4
- Related: Hyundai Santa Fe; Hawtai Shengdafei

Powertrain
- Engine: 2.0 L I4; 2.4 L I4; 2.0 L I4 turbo 1.9 L I4 diesel
- Transmission: 4-speed automatic 5-speed automatic 5-speed manual

Dimensions
- Wheelbase: 2,620 mm (103.1 in)
- Length: 4,500 mm (177.2 in)
- Width: 1,875 mm (73.8 in)
- Height: 1,730 mm (68.1 in)
- Curb weight: 1,650 kg (3,640 lb)

Chronology
- Successor: JAC Refine S5; JAC Refine S7

The JAC Rein (瑞鹰) is a compact sport utility vehicle (SUV) produced by Chinese automaker JAC Motors from 2007 to 2013.

== Overview ==
The JAC Rein was originally launched as the JAC Eagle. The new name Rein in Chinese is 瑞鹰, Ruiying, meaning ‘Lucky Eagle’. JAC translated Ruiying into English as ‘Rein’ but they also use the name ‘Eagle’ in some foreign markets. The JAC Eagle name was later used to rebadge a series of crossovers from the JAC Refine product series for some foreign markets.

The JAC Rein is based on the first generation Hyundai Santa Fe due to the joint venture between Hyundai and JAC Motors with JAC building Hyundai Santa Fes under license previously. The rear lights look like the ones from a 2nd generation Lexus RX. It was launched in 2007 with a starting price of 79,800 yuan.

The JAC Rein is powered by a 2.0 liter turbo with 178 hp at 5400rpm and 235 nm at 4500rpm. Other engine options include an older 2.4 liter engine, a 2.0 liter engine and a 1.9 liter turbo diesel.

Production of a JAC Rein and a partnership with Hyundai ended in 2013 to make a way new model, the compact crossover called JAC Refine S5 which is a unlicensed copy of a three different Hyundai SUVs such as Tucson, Santa Fe, and Veracruz.

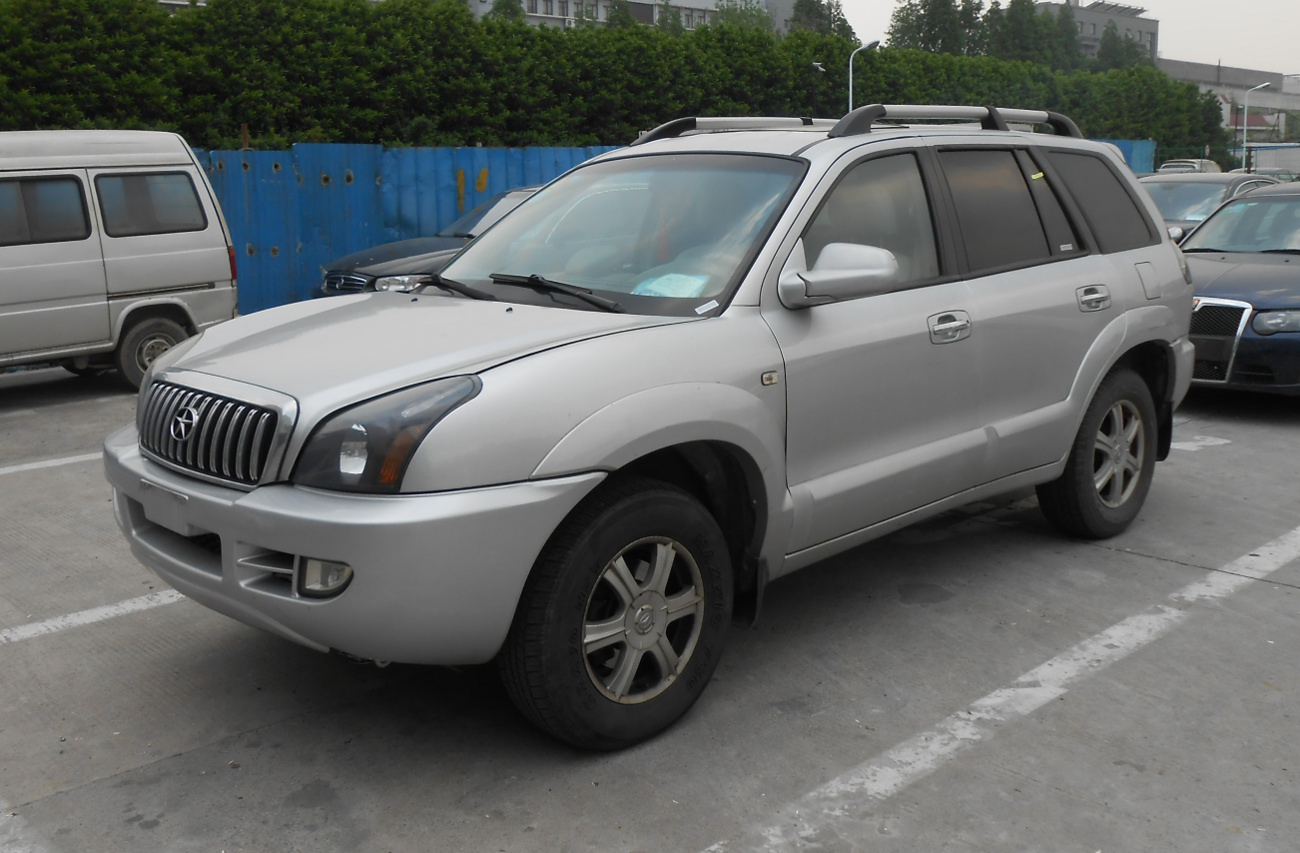
JAC Rein front

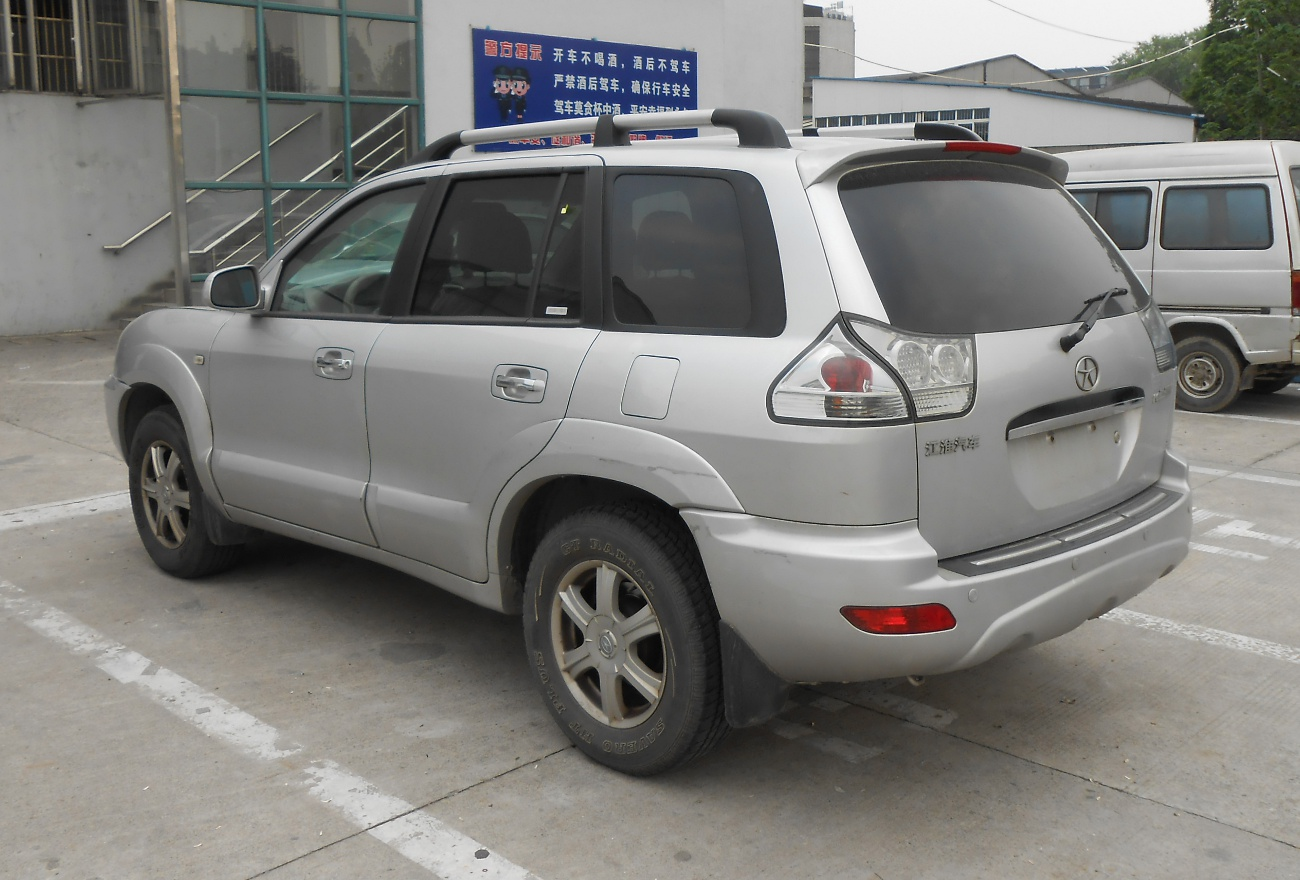
JAC Rein rear

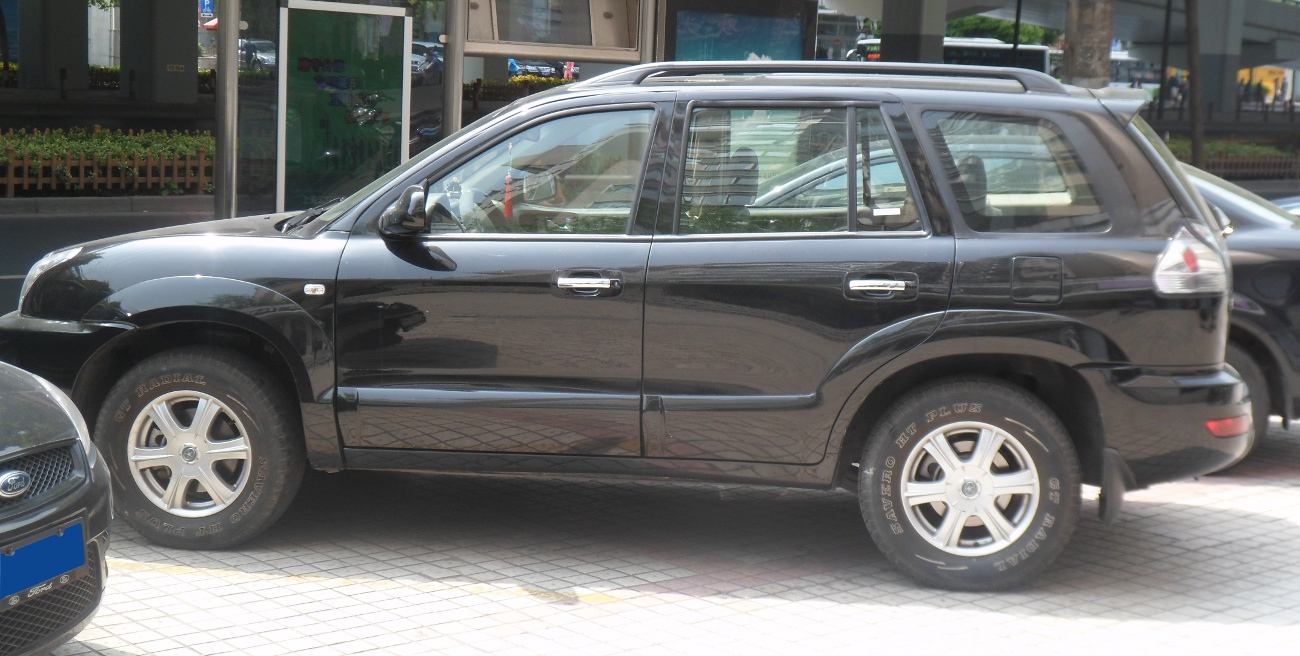
JAC Rein side
