= JAC Refine S5 =

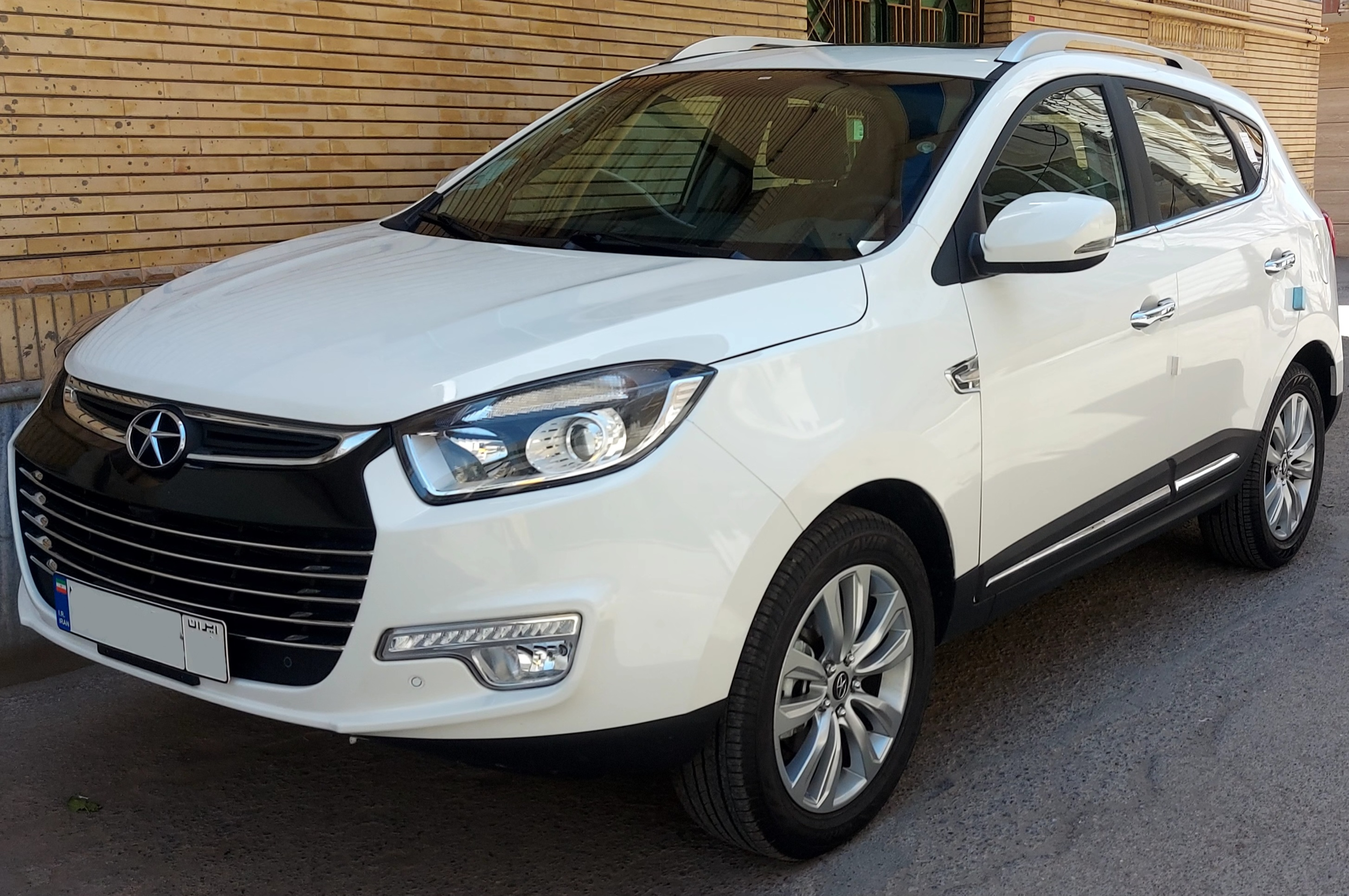

Overview
- Manufacturer: JAC Motors
- Also called: JAC Eagle S5
- Production: 2013–2019

Body and chassis
- Class: Compact CUV
- Body style: 5-door station wagon

Powertrain
- Engine: 1.5 L I4 (petrol) 2.0 (Turbo) (174 hp in 5200 rpm, 265 nm in 2000 to 4000 rpm)
- Transmission: 6-speed manual 6-speed dual-clutch

Dimensions
- Wheelbase: 2,645 mm (104.1 in)
- Length: 4,475 mm (176.2 in)
- Width: 1,840 mm (72.4 in)
- Height: 1,670–1,680 mm (65.7–66.1 in)
- Curb weight: 1,475–1,495 kg (3,252–3,296 lb)

Chronology
- Predecessor: JAC Rein
- Successor: Sehol X6

The JAC Refine S5 is a Compact CUV that was produced by JAC Motors and positioned above the slightly smaller JAC Refine S3.

== Overview ==
Previewed by the JAC Eagle SII concept on the 2012 Beijing Auto Show and originally launched on the 2012 Guangzhou Auto Show as the JAC Eagle S5, the compact crossover was quickly rebranded to Refine S5 during the facelift shortly after to fit into the later established Refine sub-brand. Pricing of the JAC Eagle S5 ranges from 89,800 yuan to 135,800 yuan, while the pricing of the facelifted Refine S5 ranges from 89,500 yuan to 139,500 yuan.

The JAC S5 is based on a Sehol X6 platform instead of being using the Hyundai-Kia Platforms due to ended their licensed production with the Hyundai Santa Fe-based JAC Rein.

=== Styling controversies ===
Just like with the predecessor JAC Rein that copied the Hyundai Santa Fe under license featuring Lexus RX or Toyota Harrier at the back, the successor JAC S5 had copied the major three different cars such as Hyundai Veracruz at the front end with the chrome bar like the first generation Hyundai Tucson China facelift, a third generation Hyundai Santa Fe with Audi-style lights at the back, and a side profile what appears to be a second generation Hyundai Tucson/ix35 with a restyled and different side mirrors, making it one of the unlicensed copy of a Hyundai SUV. A facelift version features restyled front bumpers to differentiate by the Hyundai Veracruz featuring a chrome bar design.

=== Engines and transmissions ===
The JAC Refine S5 is available with two engines including a 1.8-liter turbo engine with 163 hp and 253 nm mated to a six-speed manual gearbox, and a naturally aspirated 2.0-liter engine with 136 hp and 180 nm, mated to a 5-speed manual gearbox at launch.

== Gallery ==
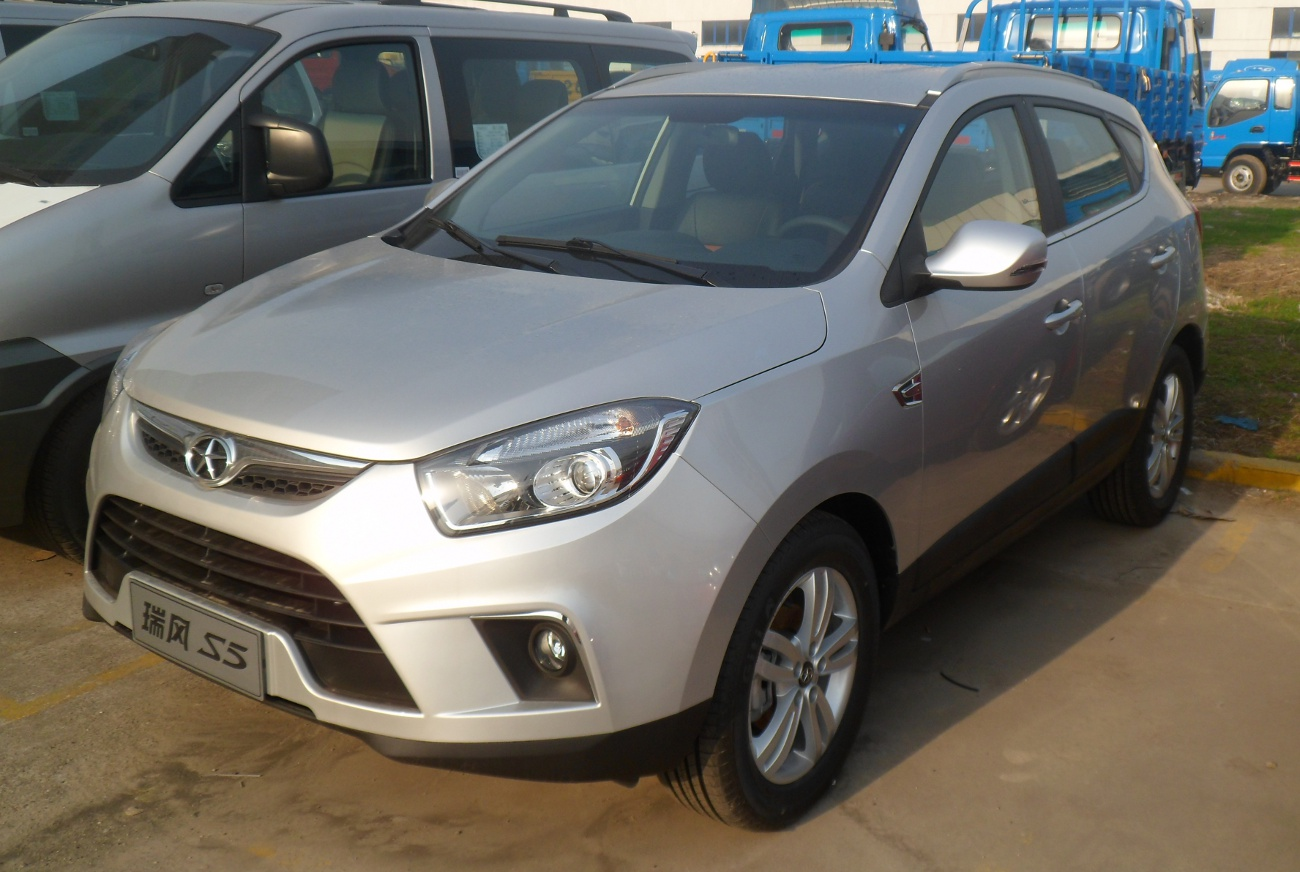
Pre-facelift Refine S5 front
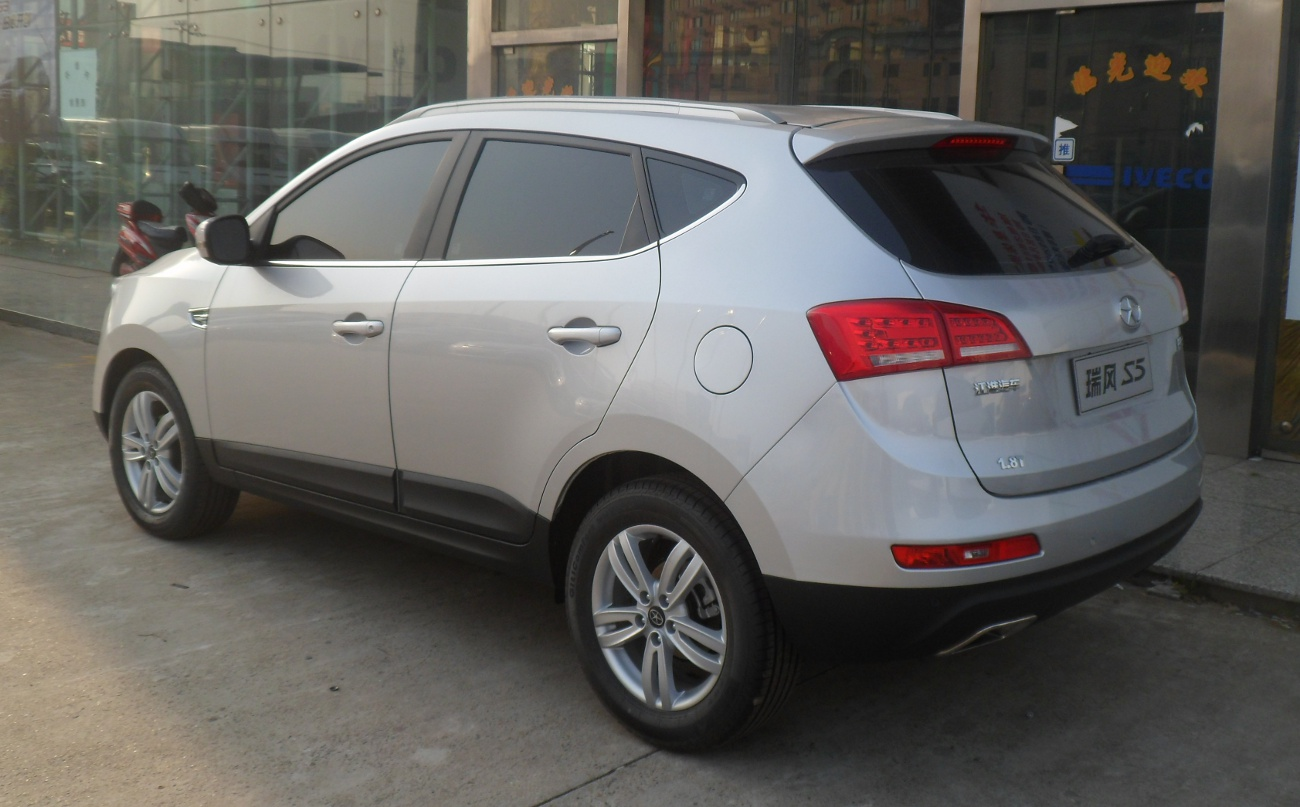
Pre-facelift Refine S5 rear

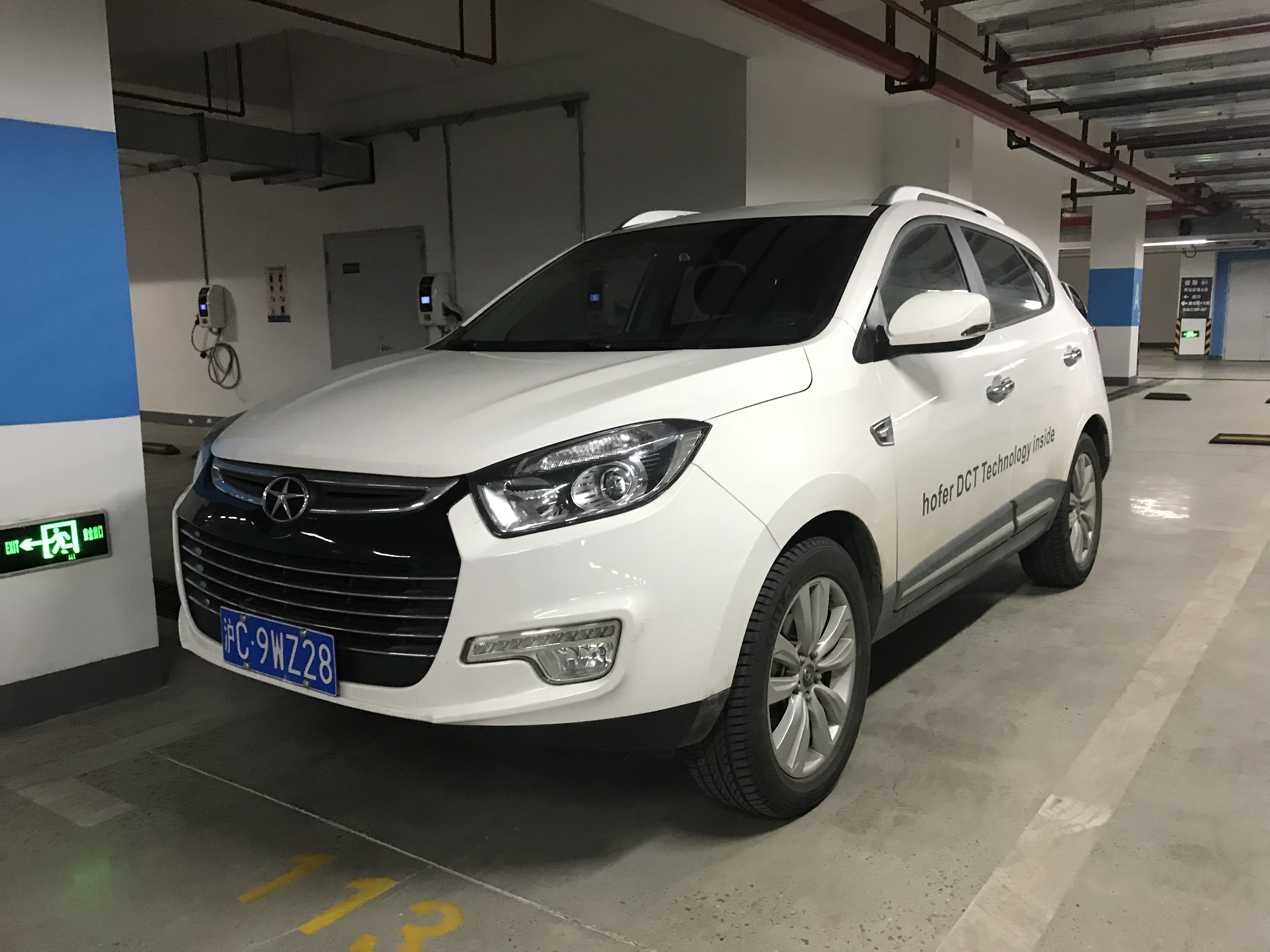
Post-facelift Refine S5 front

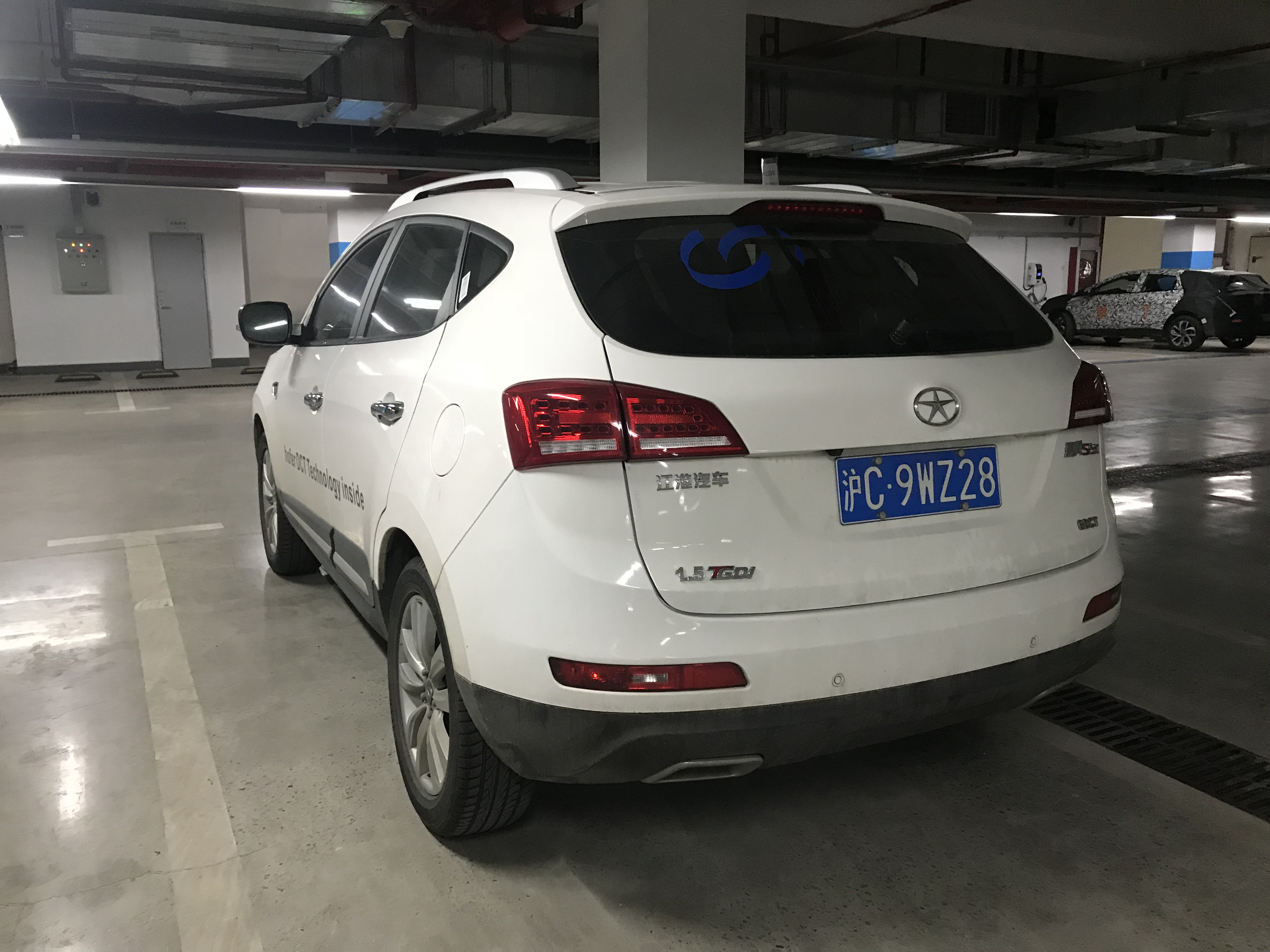
Post-facelift Refine S5 rear
