= JAC Yueyue =

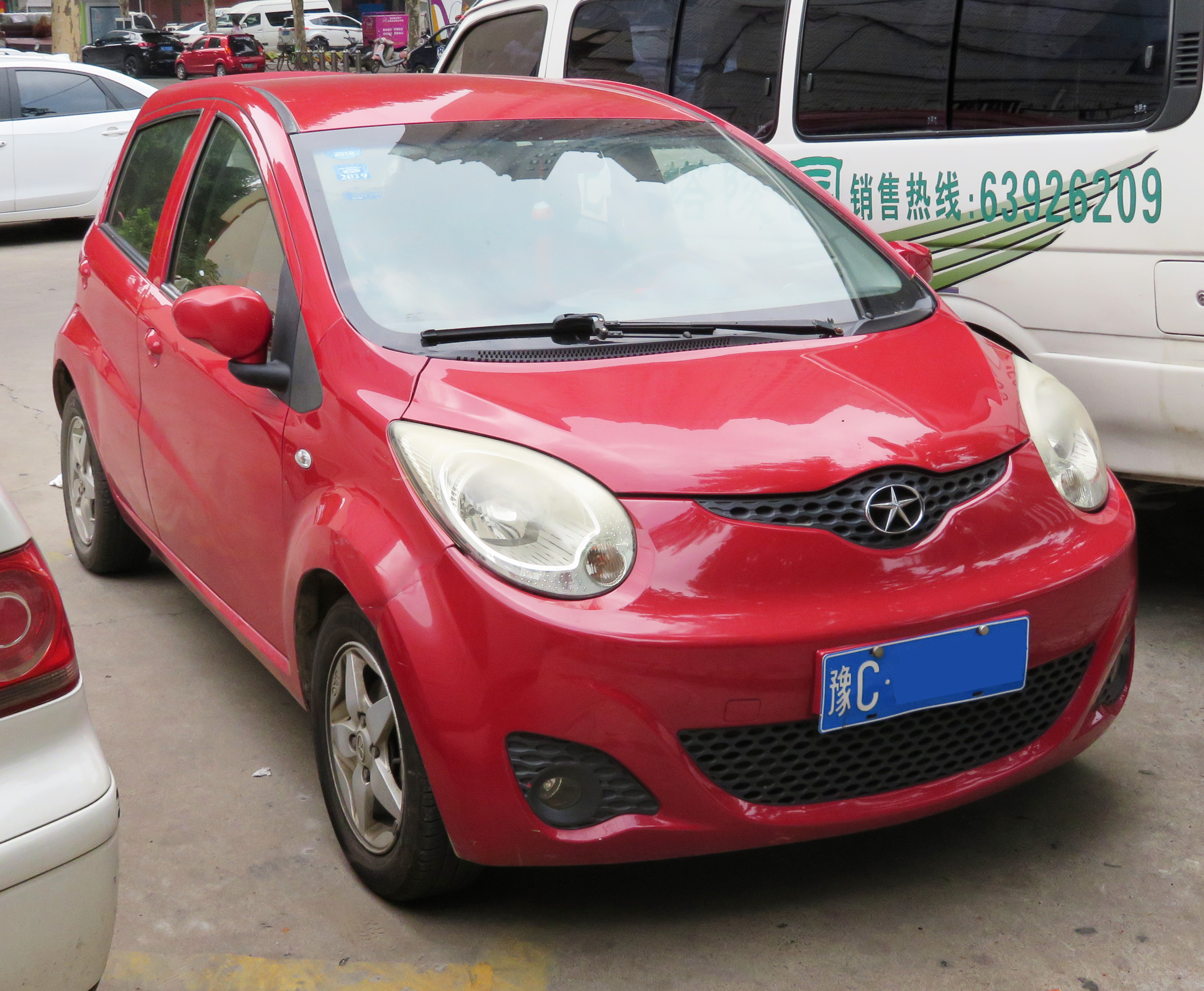

Overview
- Manufacturer: JAC Motors
- Also called: JAC A0; JAC J1; JAC J2; JAC S1; JAC Yueyue Cross; JAC Refine S2 Mini; JAC iEV6E
- Production: 2010–2019
- Assembly: Hefei, China; Luque, Paraguay
- Designer: Goran Popović

Body and chassis
- Class: City car
- Body style: 5-door hatchback
- Layout: Front-engine, front-wheel-drive
- Related: JAC iEV6E; Sehol E10X

Powertrain
- Engine: 1.0L I4 (petrol); 1.3L I4 (petrol)
- Transmission: 5-speed manual 4-speed automatic

Dimensions
- Wheelbase: 2,390 mm (94.1 in)
- Length: 3,535 mm (139.2 in); 3,775 mm (148.6 in) (S2 Mini)
- Width: 1,640 mm (64.6 in); 1,745 mm (68.7 in) (S2 Mini)
- Height: 1,475 mm (58.1 in)
- Curb weight: 890 kg (1,962 lb)

JAC Yueyue is a city car produced by JAC under the Heyue passenger car series that debuted on the 2010 Beijing Auto Show.

== Overview ==
The Yueyue was available starting from August 2010 for a price range of 30,000 to 40,000 rmb. Engine is a 1.0 litre inline-four producing 50 kW with 95 nm of torque with a top speed of 150 km/h.

The facelift for the JAC Yueyue was revealed at the 2012 Chengdu Auto Show with updated front end rear bumper designs and engines including a 1.0L with 68 hp and a 1.3L with 99 hp.

A battery electric version is sold as the JAC iEV6E.

In 2012, during the São Paulo Auto Show, the Yueyue (badged as JAC J2) made its debut in the Brazilian market. The model was equipped with a 1.4 liter naturally aspirated VVT gasoline engine (1332 cm³), capable of delivering 108 hp (79.4 kW) of power at 6,000 rpm and 14.1 kgf-m of torque at 4,500 rpm; this engine was combined with a 5-speed manual gearbox. In the end of 2014 was introduce a flex fuel engine (petrol and ethanol).

In 2016, JAC Motors start production of J2 in CKD regime at Reimpex Group manufacturing unit located in Luque, Paraguay. The model was sold in the country with a 1.0L (999 cc) 16v DOHC gasoline engine (code DAK10A). This power plant is capable of generating 68 hp (50.0 kW) of power at 6000 rpm, and has a maximum torque of 85.3 Nm at 4500 rpm combined with a manual transmission 5-speed.

The Yueyue was discontinued globally in 2019.

== Yueyue Cross ==
The JAC Yueyue Cross is a mini crossover based on the Yueyue city car. Revealed after the facelift in 2012, the Yueyue Cross features bigger plastic bumpers, plastic cladding around the wheel arches and extra plastic roof rails.

== Refine S2 Mini ==
The Refine S2 Mini was developed from the Yueyue, which is a front-wheel drive mini SUV version presented in late 2016 and put on sale in China in January 2017. This model has specific aesthetic features: the front has been redesigned and standardized in style to the remaining range of JAC "Refine" SUV and features new horizontal headlights with LED daytime running lights and a new hourglass grille with chrome bars, raw plastic protectors along the lower body and specific rear bumpers with tailgate that houses the spare wheel external. The taillights are also new in a triangular shape. The interior is specific and features a redesigned dashboard also available in two colors with new instrumentation and new multimedia touchscreen screen. The dimensions of the S2 Mini are equal to a length of 3.775 meters, a height of 1.685 meters and a width of 1.775 meters. The pitch remains the same as in J2. The Refine S2 Mini replaces the previous Yueyue/J2 Cross; the standard version of the Yueyue/J2 remains on the list. The engine available is the only 99 horsepower 1.3 petrol. In some Latin American countries it was sold as JAC S1.

== Electric versions ==
=== JAV iEV6E ===
The JAC iEV6E is an electric city car produced from 2016 under the iEV electric vehicle series based on the same platform as the JAC Yueyue as part of the JAC iEV new energy vehicle brand. The JAC iEV6E was available starting April 2017. Originally debuted in April at the 2016 Beijing Auto Show, the production version was revealed during the 2017 Shanghai Auto Show. It is powered by an electric motor producing 80 HP and 175 Nm of torque. Range is 152 kilometers with a top speed of 102 km/h.

==== 2018 facelift ====
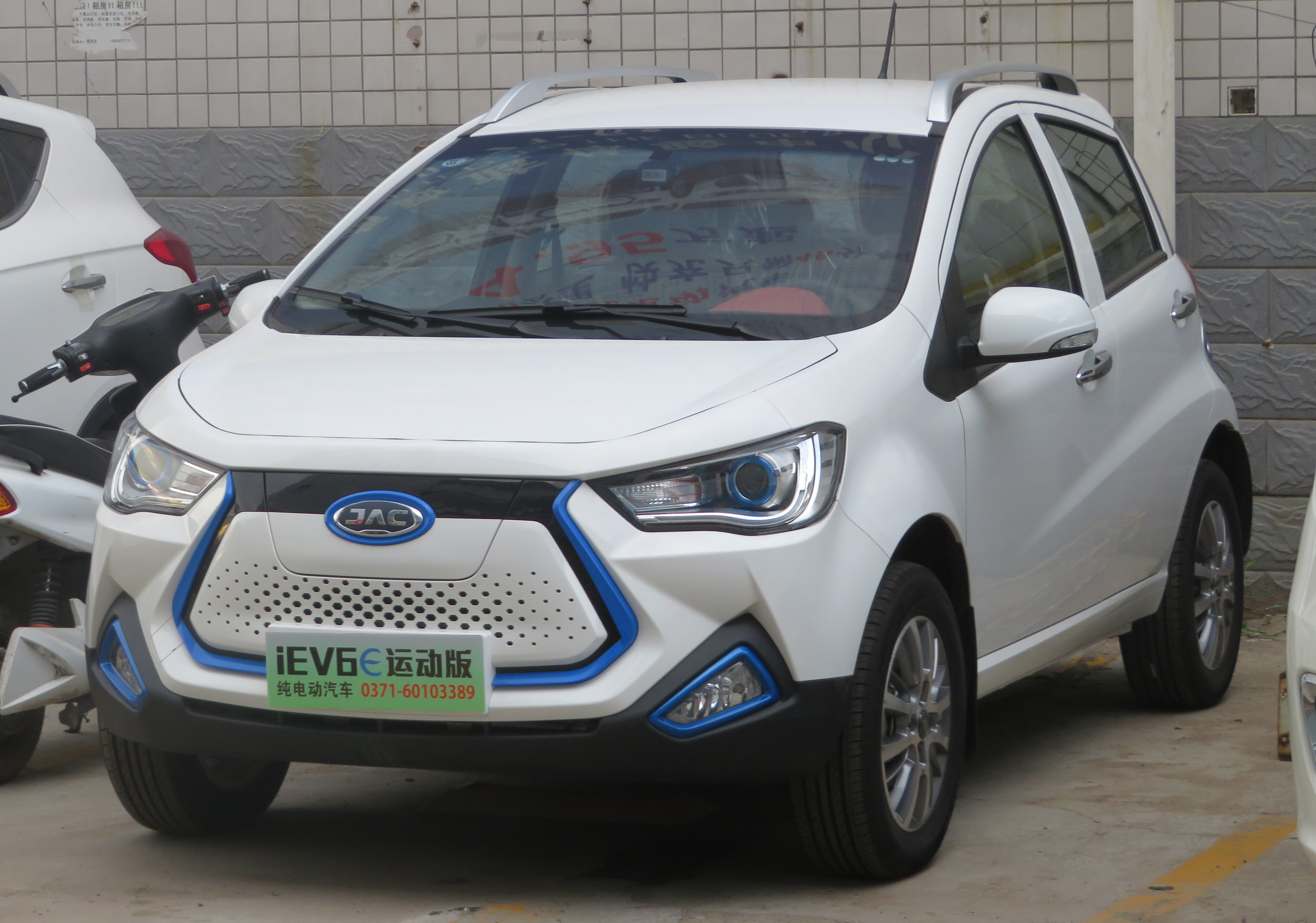

On June 26, 2018, the iEV6E Model Year 2019 was launched in China with a new range consisting of three versions: the base called Upgrade aesthetically equal to the petrol-powered JAC J2, the intermediate Youth equal to the J2 Cross which it has the circular headlights and raised trim with front and side bumper shield and roof bars and the Sport version that has the aesthetics of the Refine S2 Mini petrol crossover and which can optionally mount the external spare wheel on the tailgate. The 2019 range features a new 34.9 kWh lithium-ion battery weighing 249 kg produced by Gotion (Guoxuan Hi-Tech). The permanent magnet electric motor is available in two versions: the less powerful delivers 45 kW (60 HP) and 200 Nm of torque, the more powerful delivers 55 kW (75 HP) and 215 Nm of torque. The battery is standard on all models and has a range of 310 km (NEDC cycle). The car has three driving modes: L (long distance mode), E (economy mode) and S (standard mode) to choose and also introduces the E-Pedal with brake function with energy recovery function which increases battery life by 17%.

==== South American market ====
In December 2019, the version for the Brazilian market renamed JAC iEV20 was presented, presenting the crossover aesthetics of the iEV6E Sport. Sales start from January 2020. Compared to the Chinese model, the iEV20 comes standard with the leak detection sensor active up to 25 km/h. The iEV20 come standard with JAC Link infotainment system with 7-inch touchscreen with Apple Carplay or Android Auto connectivity. The powertrain is the same as the Chinese iEV6E with a self-limited top speed of 113 km/h. The safety features include dual front airbags, ABS, EBD, electronic stability control and traction. In Mexico it was imported from April 2020 renamed JAC E Sei1 and has the same features and specifications as the Brazilian model.

=== Sehol E10X ===
The Sehol E10X is a restyled version of iEV6E sold in China by the Sehol marque (a joint venture between JAC and Volkswagen Group). The E10X has a different front bumper and grille, new interior but retains the same body and powertrain.

== Gallery ==
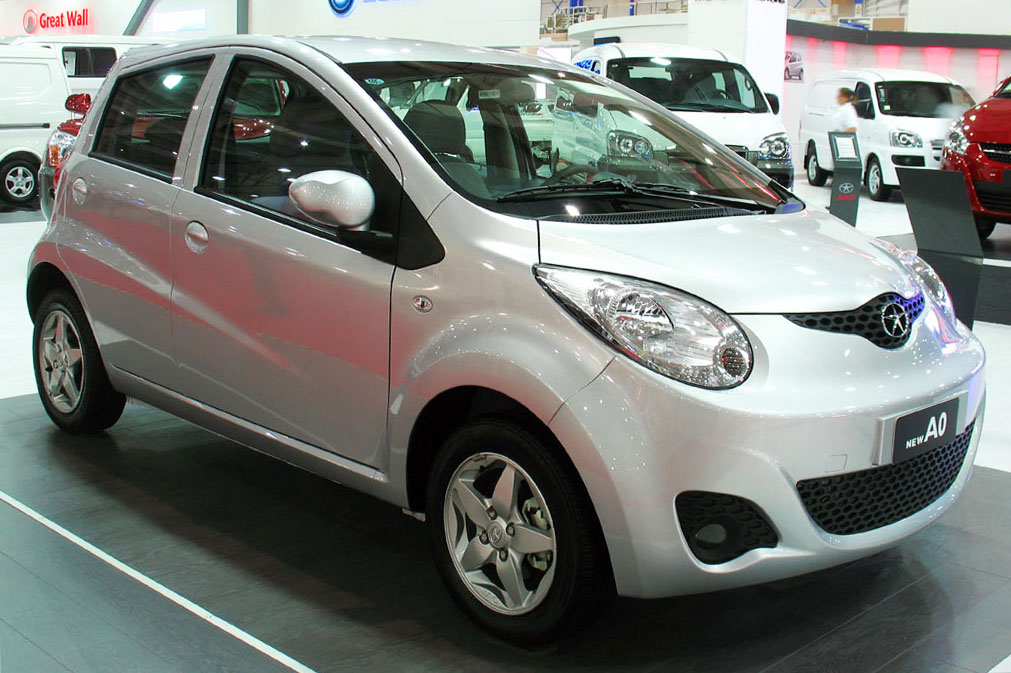
JAC A0 front

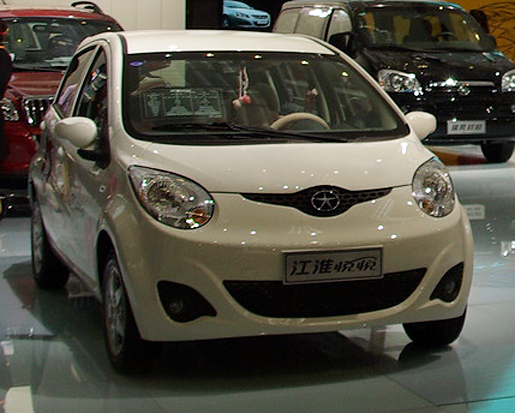
JAC Yueyue front.

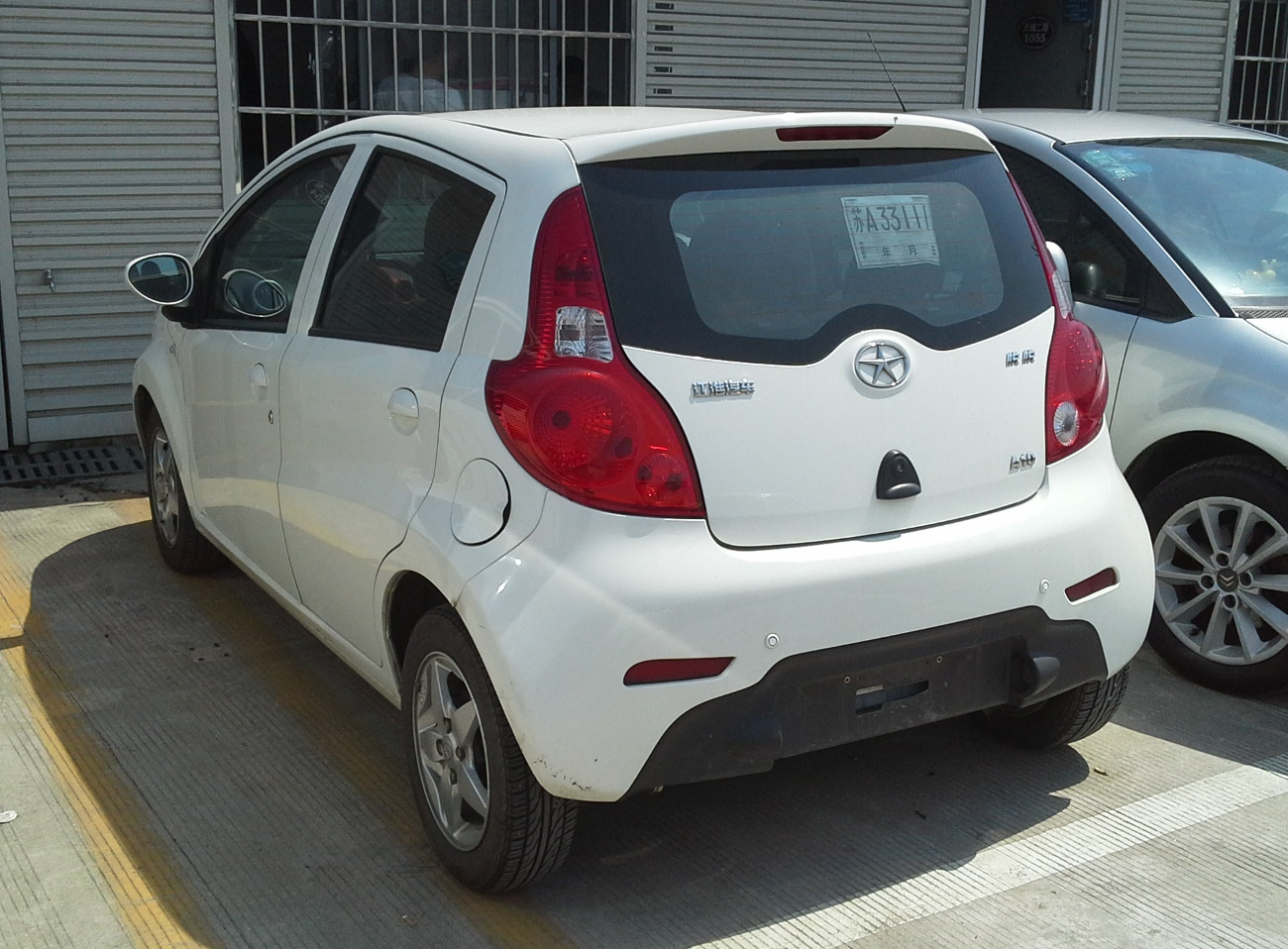
JAC Yueyue rear.

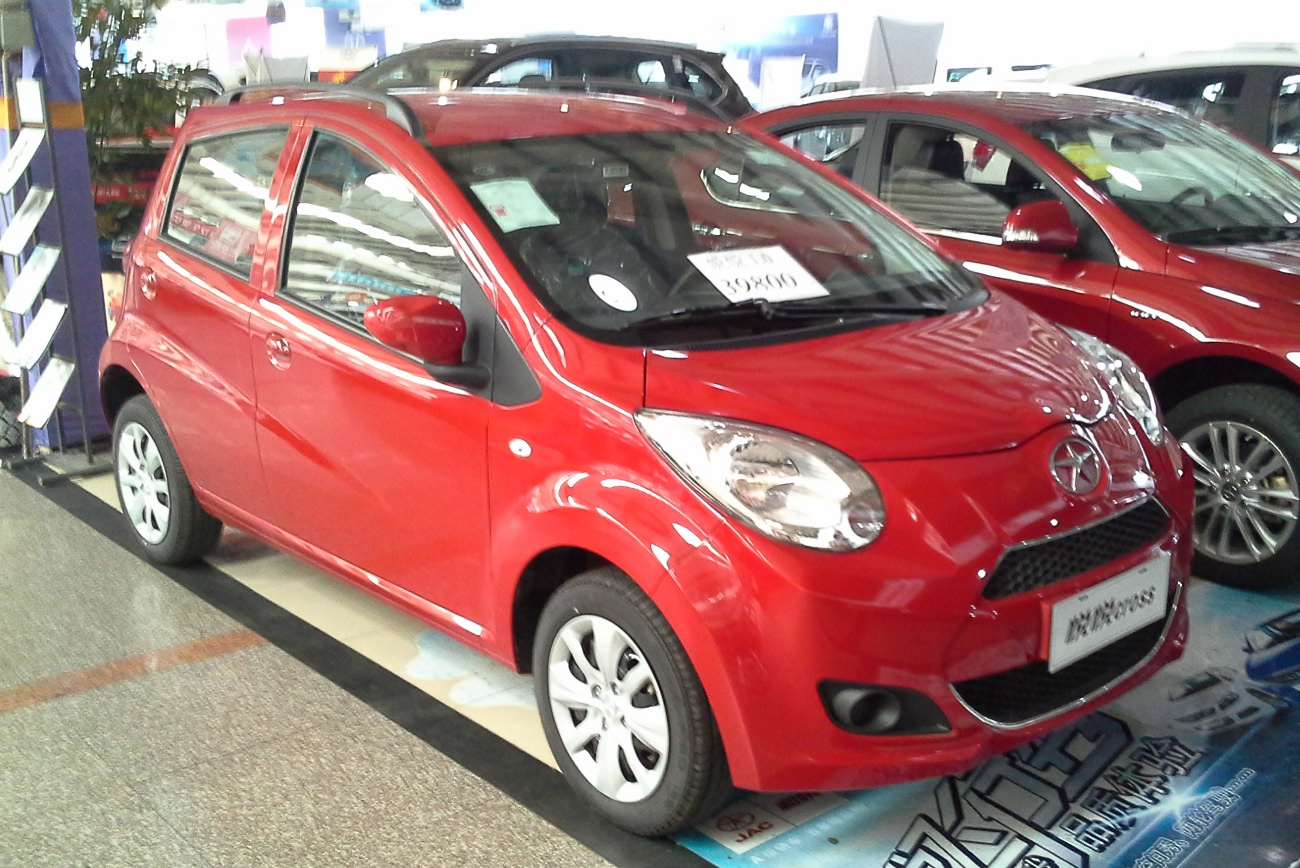
JAC Yueyue Cross front.

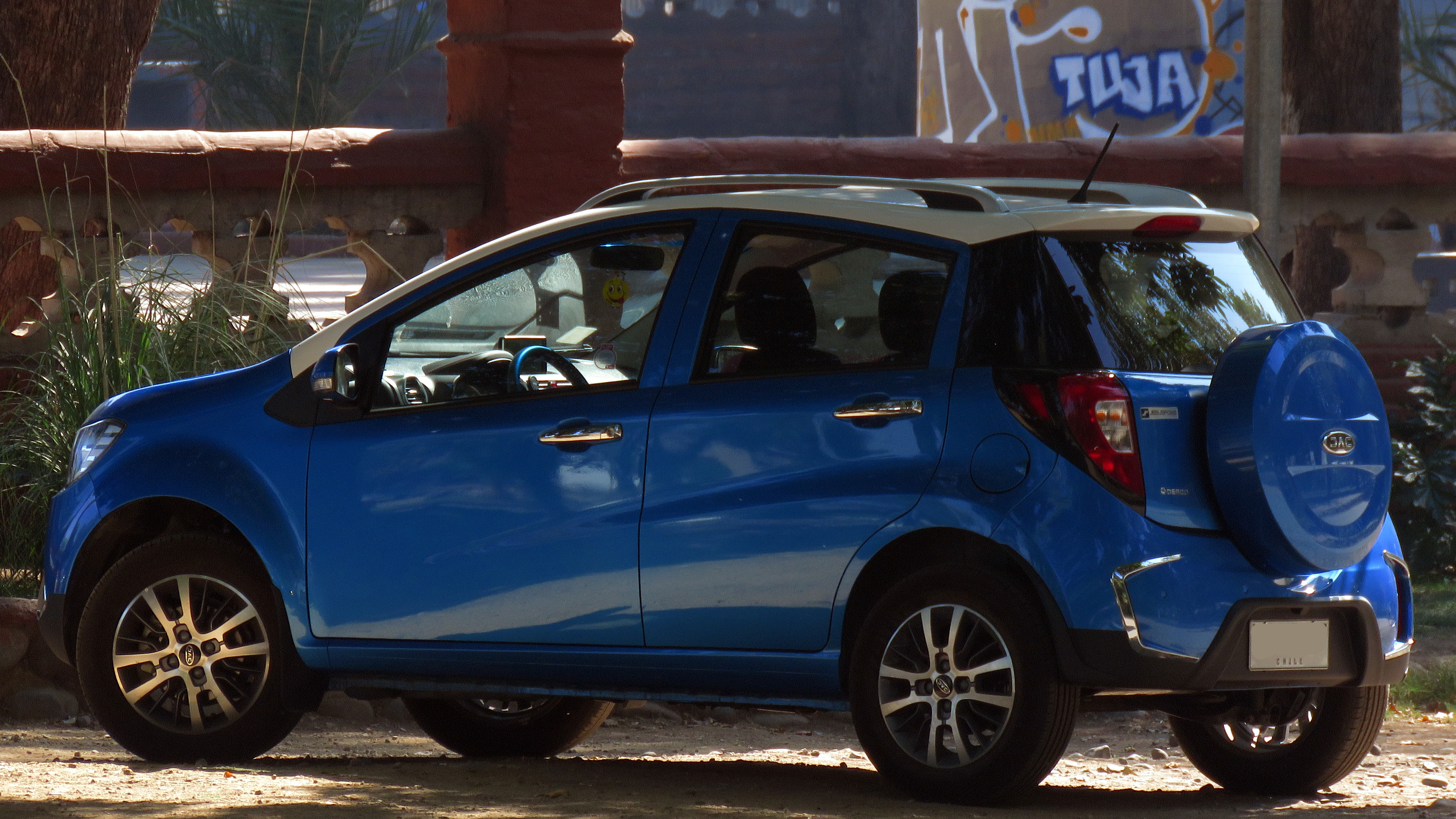
JAC S1 rear

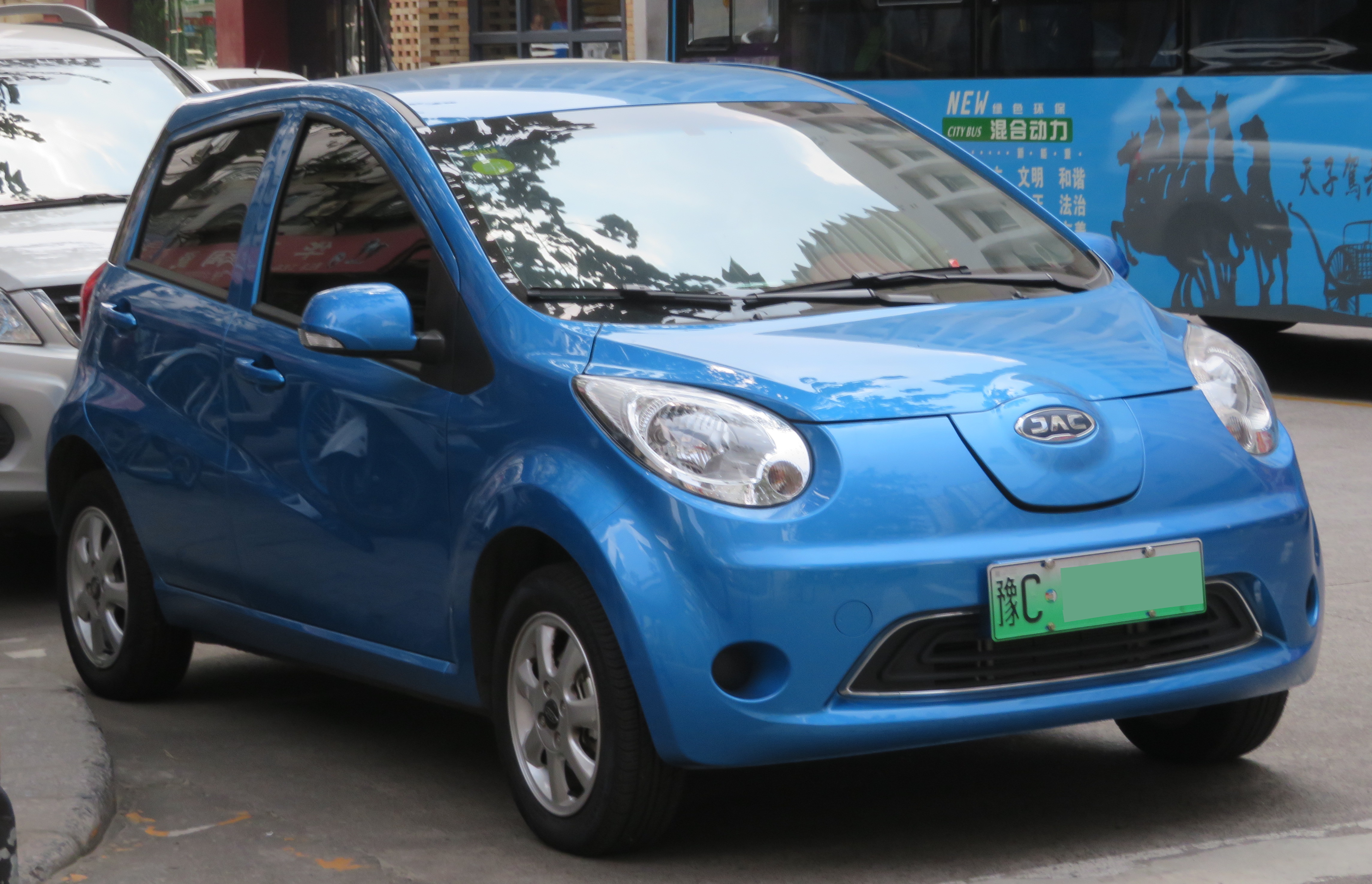
JAC iEV6E front.

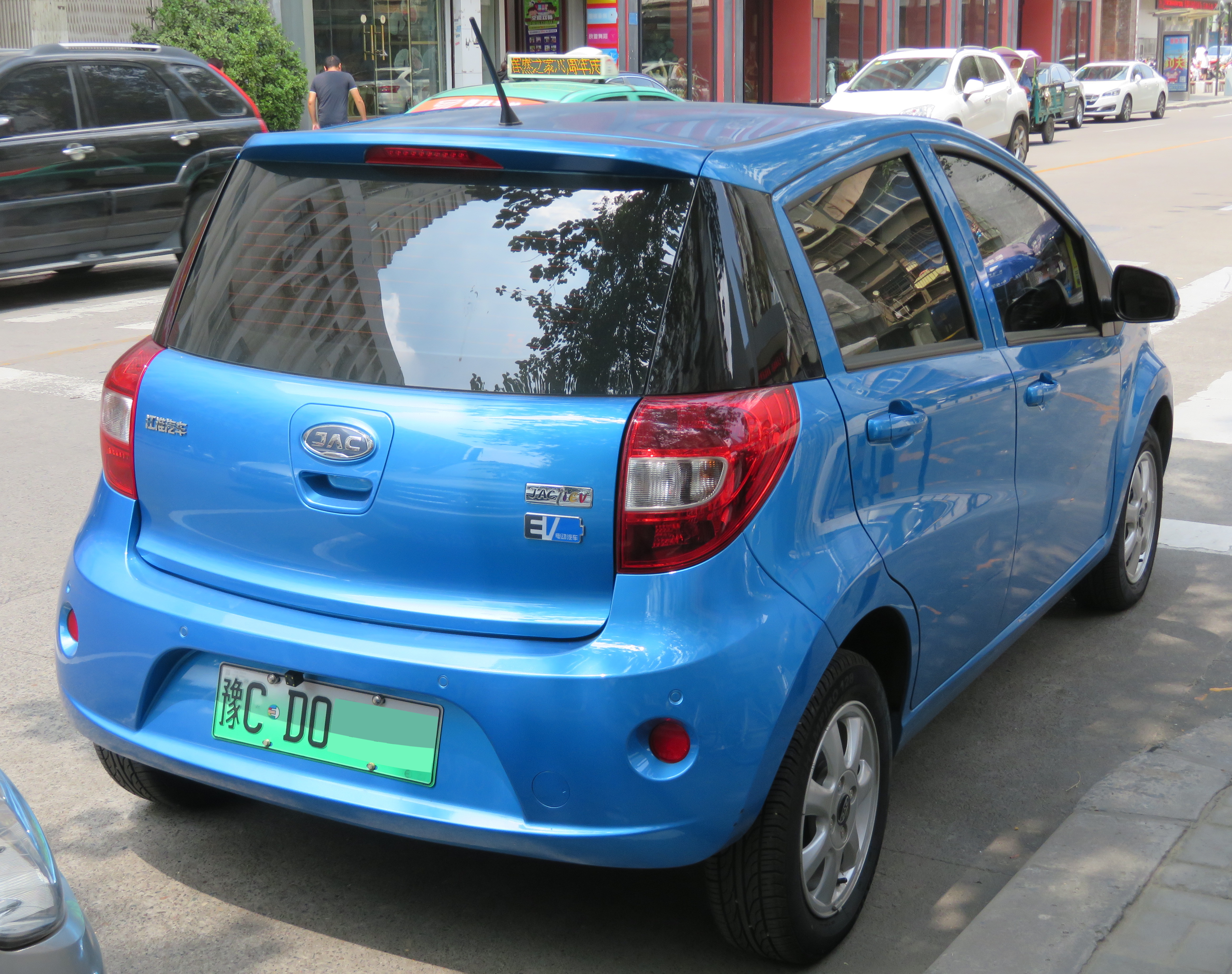
JAC iEV6E rear.

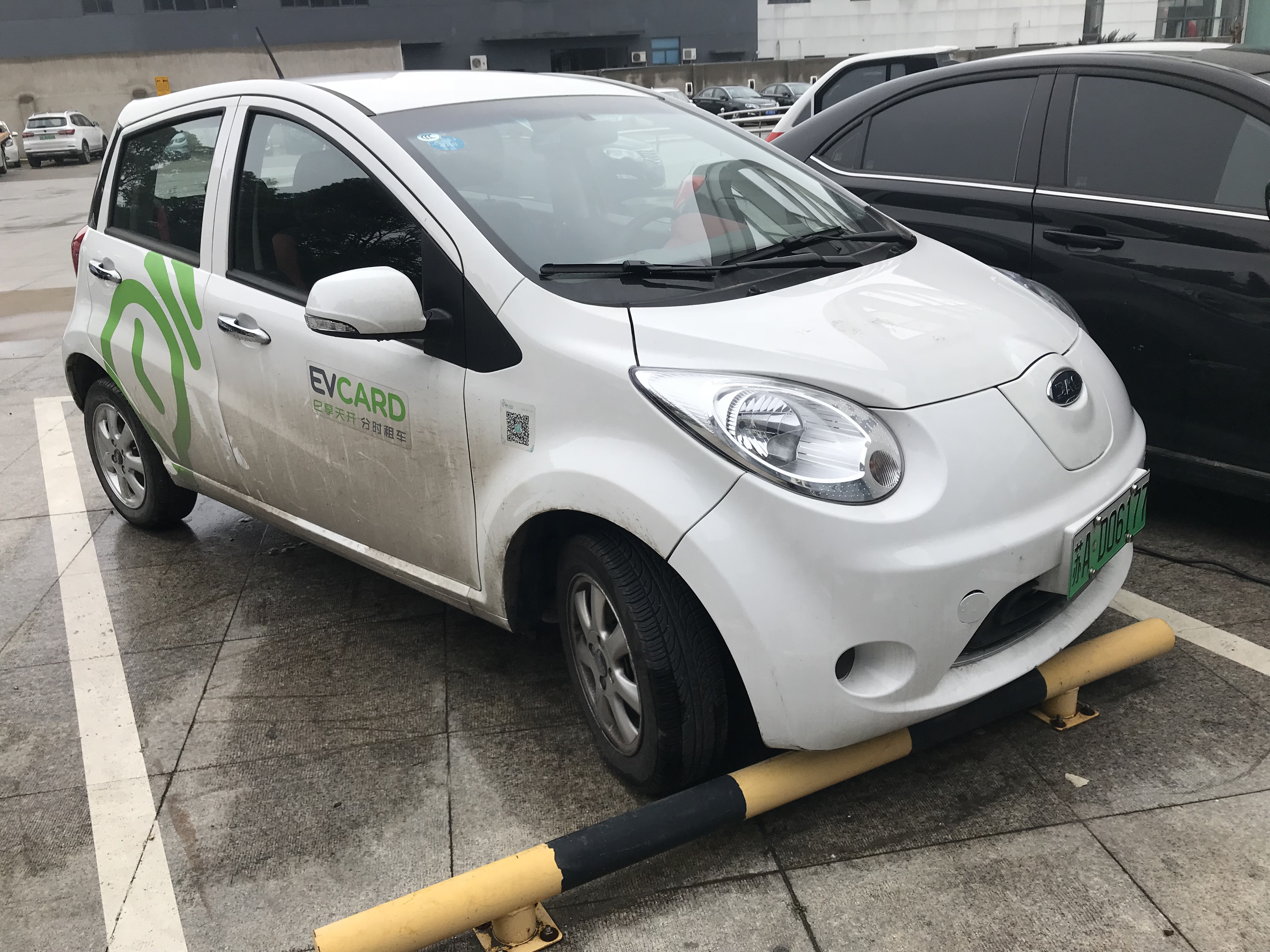
JAC iEV6E EVCARD front.

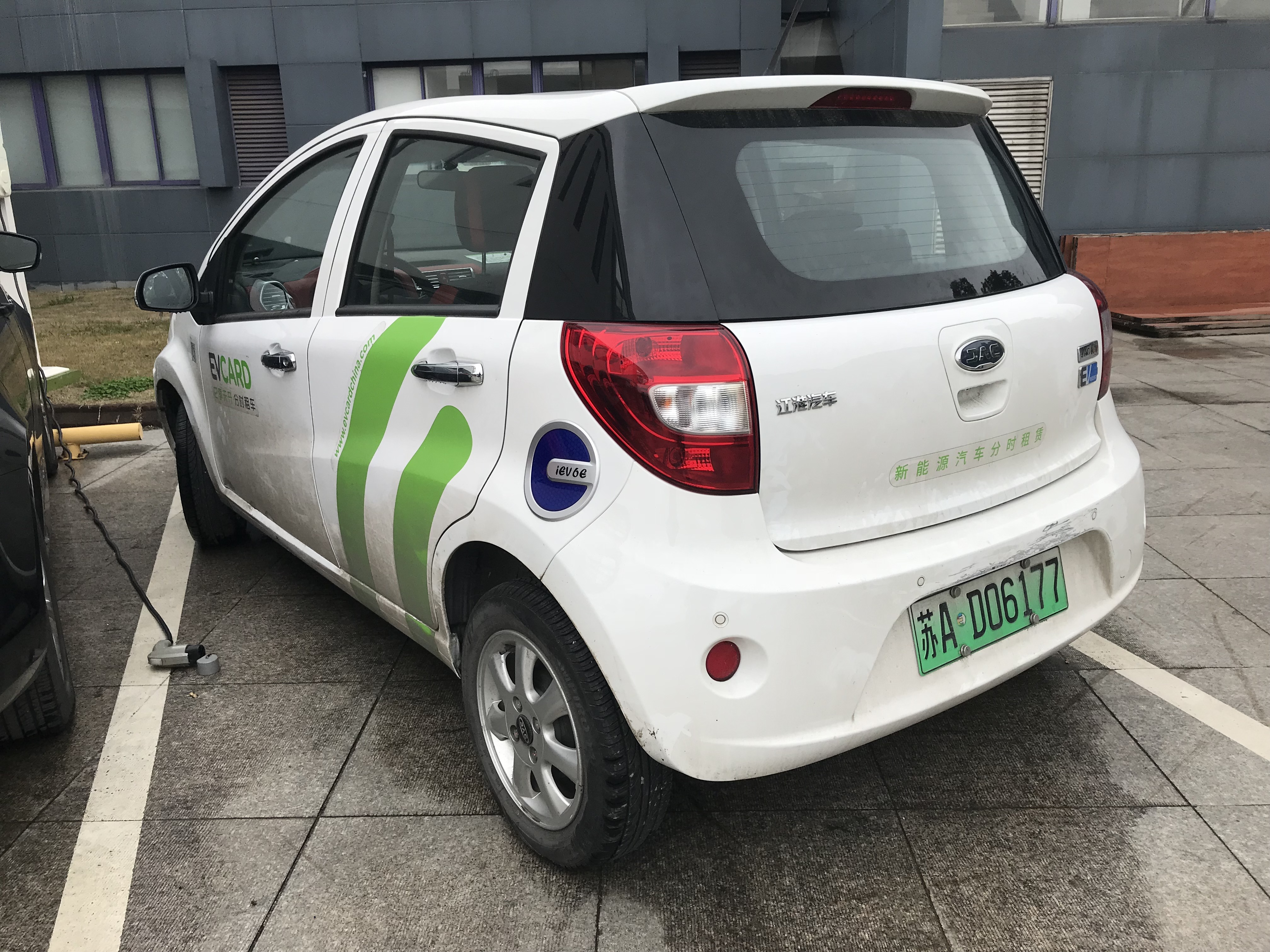
JAC iEV6E EVCARD rear.

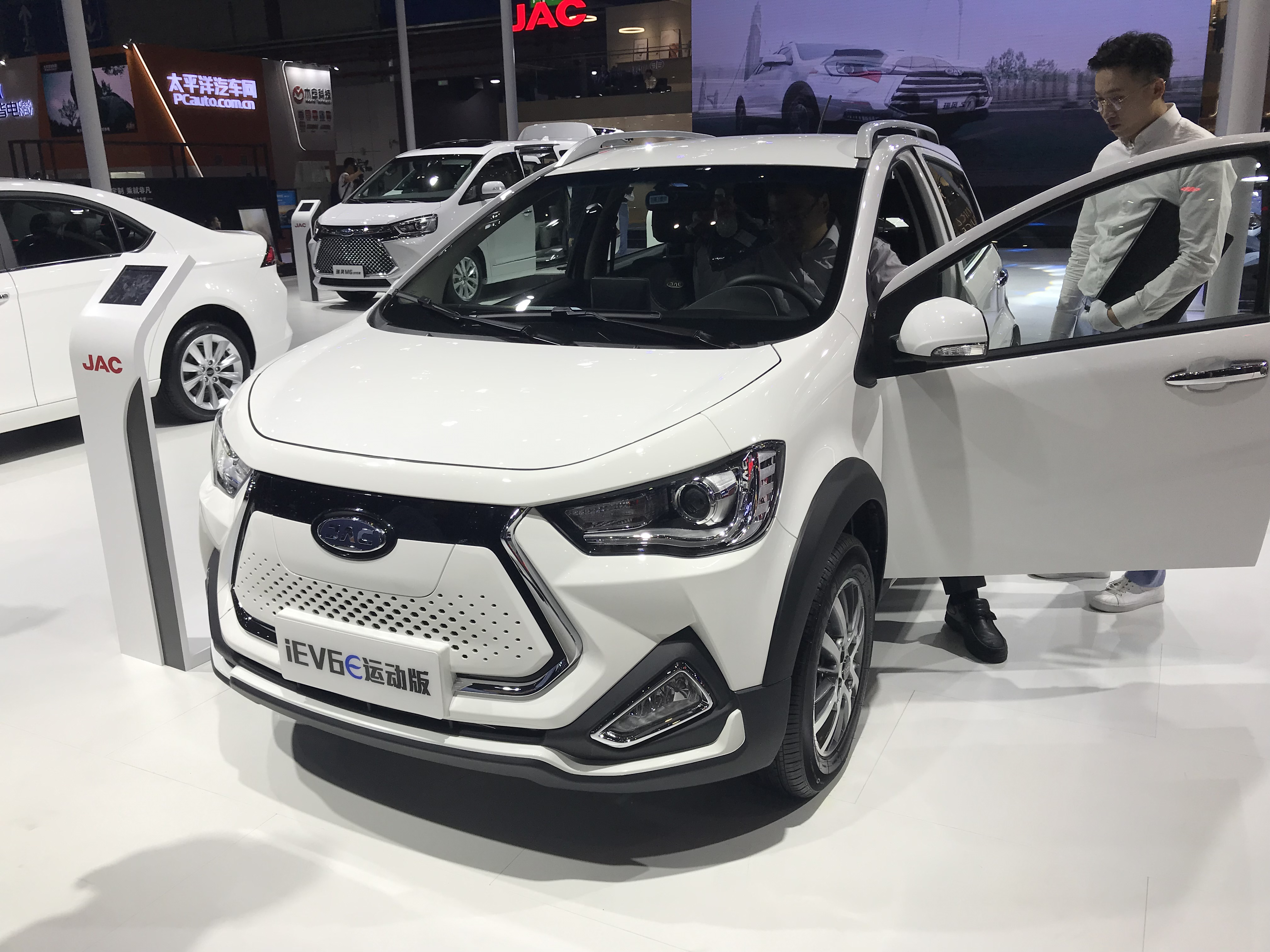
JAC iEV6E Sport

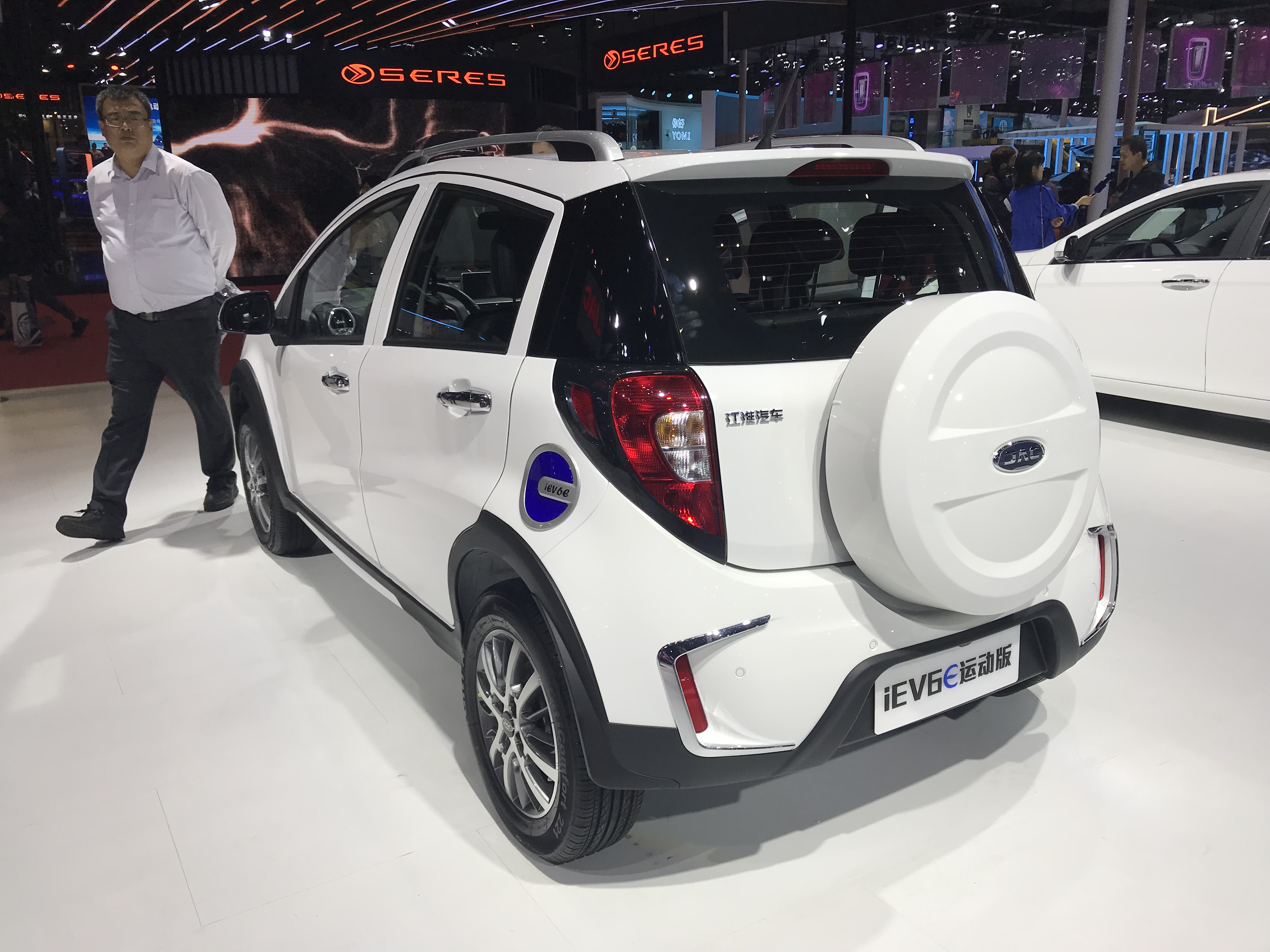
JAC iEV6E Sport with a spare tire.
