= EvCard =

Chinese carsharing company

EvCard 电动汽车租赁
- Company type: Private
- Industry: Car rental
- Founded: 2015
- Headquarters: China
- Services: Carsharing
- Website: https://www.evcard.com/

EvCard (Chinese: 电动汽车租赁) is a Chinese carsharing company launched in Shanghai by SAIC Group in 2015.

== Overview ==
EvCard is China's first electric vehicle rental service. As of July 2017, it had around 6,000 cars and 3,000 stations in Shanghai. EvCard also operates in 31 other Chinese cities with 5,200 branches and nearly 30,000 parking lots.

The company charges 15 yuan for the first half hour and 0.6 RMB for each additional minute. The cars available are the Roewe e50, Roewe ERX5 Chery EQ, BAIC EC180, BAIC EV160, Zotye E200, JAC iEV7, and BMW i3, among others.

== Subscribers ==
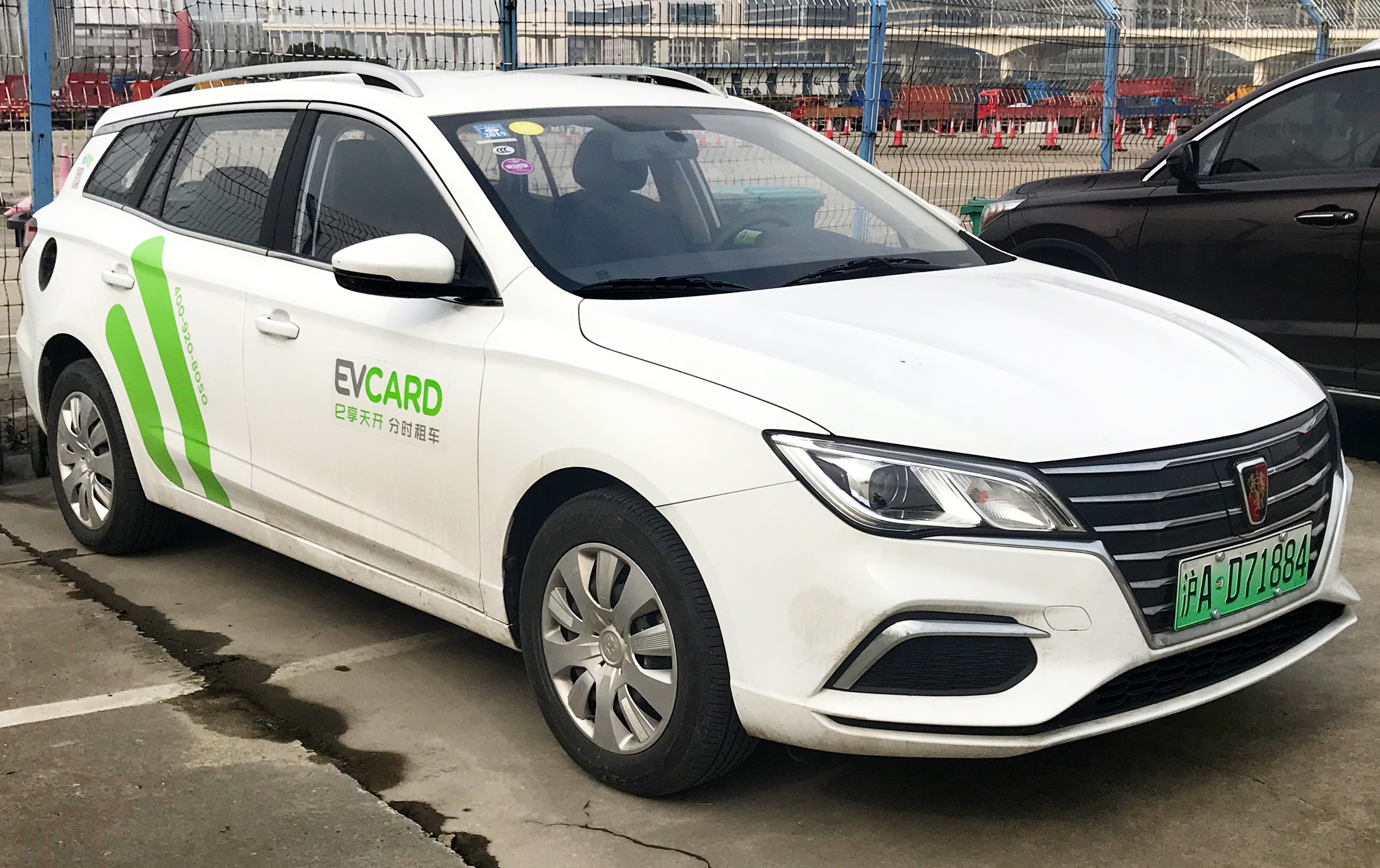
Roewe Ei5 EvCard car in Shanghai

The total subscribers is more than 1.2 million people meaning it is one of the largest such services in the world. Their customer base mainly comprises university students and teachers and the self-employed. The majority of the users are between 21 and 35 years old, about 70% of whom are men.
