= Haima M8 =

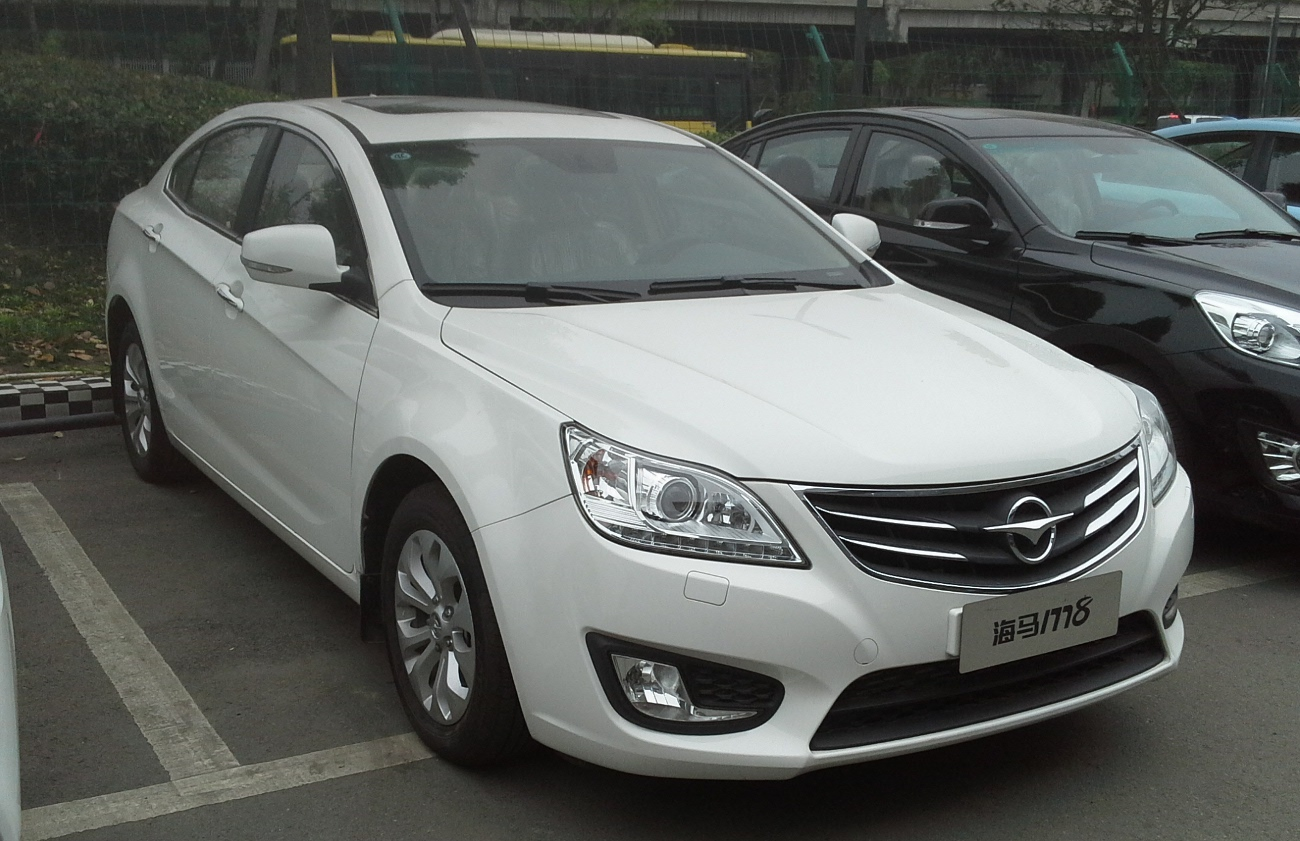
- Haima M8

Overview
- Production: 2013–2017
- Model years: 2013–2017
- Assembly: Hainan, China

Body and chassis
- Class: Full-size car (E)
- Body style: 4-door sedan

Powertrain
- Engine: 1.8 L HM484Q-T I4 (turbo petrol); 2.0 L HM484Q-E I4 (at launch)
- Transmission: 6-speed manual 6-speed automatic

Dimensions
- Wheelbase: 2,800 mm (110.2 in)
- Length: 4,845 mm (190.7 in)
- Width: 1,830 mm (72.0 in)
- Height: 1,475 mm (58.1 in)

The Haima M8 is a full-size sedan produced in China from 2013 to 2017 under the Haima brand.

== Overview ==
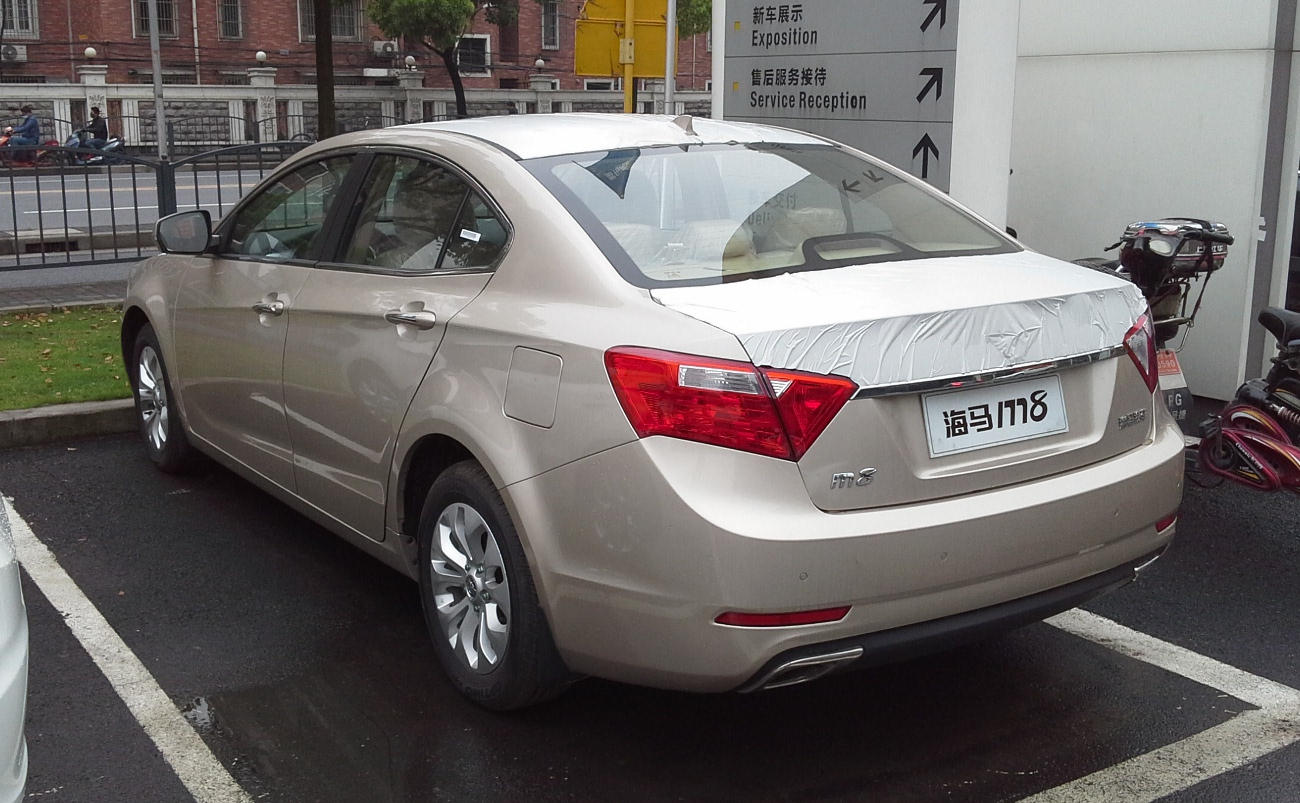
Haima M8 rear

The Haima M8 Turbo debuted in October 2014 featuring a 1.8 liter turbo engine that later became the remaining option at the end of its lifecycle. The pricing of the Haima M6 ranges from 126,800 yuan to 166,800 yuan.
