= Haima Automobile =

Chinese automotive manufacturing company

Haima Automobile Co., Ltd.
- Trade name: Haima
- Type: State-owned
- Traded as: SZSE: 000572
- Industry: Automotive
- Founded: January 1992; 34 years ago (as Hainan Mazda Motor Co., Ltd.)
- Headquarters: Haikou, Hainan, China
- Key people: Ming Tan (CEO and Director); Zhu Jing (Chairman)
- Products: Automobiles
- Revenue: 11.21 billion yuan (US$1.77 billion)
- Net income: 590 million yuan (US$93.22 million)
- Owner: Hainan Automobile Group (49%); Hainan provincial government (51%)
- Website: haima.com

Haima Automobile
- Simplified Chinese: 海马汽车集团股份有限公司
- Traditional Chinese: 海馬汽車集團股份有限公司
Transcriptions
Standard Mandarin
- Hanyu Pinyin: Hǎimǎ Qìchē Jítuán Gǔfèn Yǒuxiàn Gōngsī

Haima
- Simplified Chinese: 海马
- Traditional Chinese: 海馬
- Literal meaning: Seahorse
Transcriptions
Standard Mandarin
- Hanyu Pinyin: Hǎimǎ
- Bopomofo: ㄏㄞˇ ㄇㄚˇ
- Wade–Giles: Hai^{3}-ma^{3}
- IPA: [xàɪmà]
Wu
- Romanization: He^{上}ma^{上}
Yue: Cantonese
- Yale Romanization: Hóimáh
- Jyutping: hoi2 maa5
- IPA: [hɔj˧˥ma˩˧]

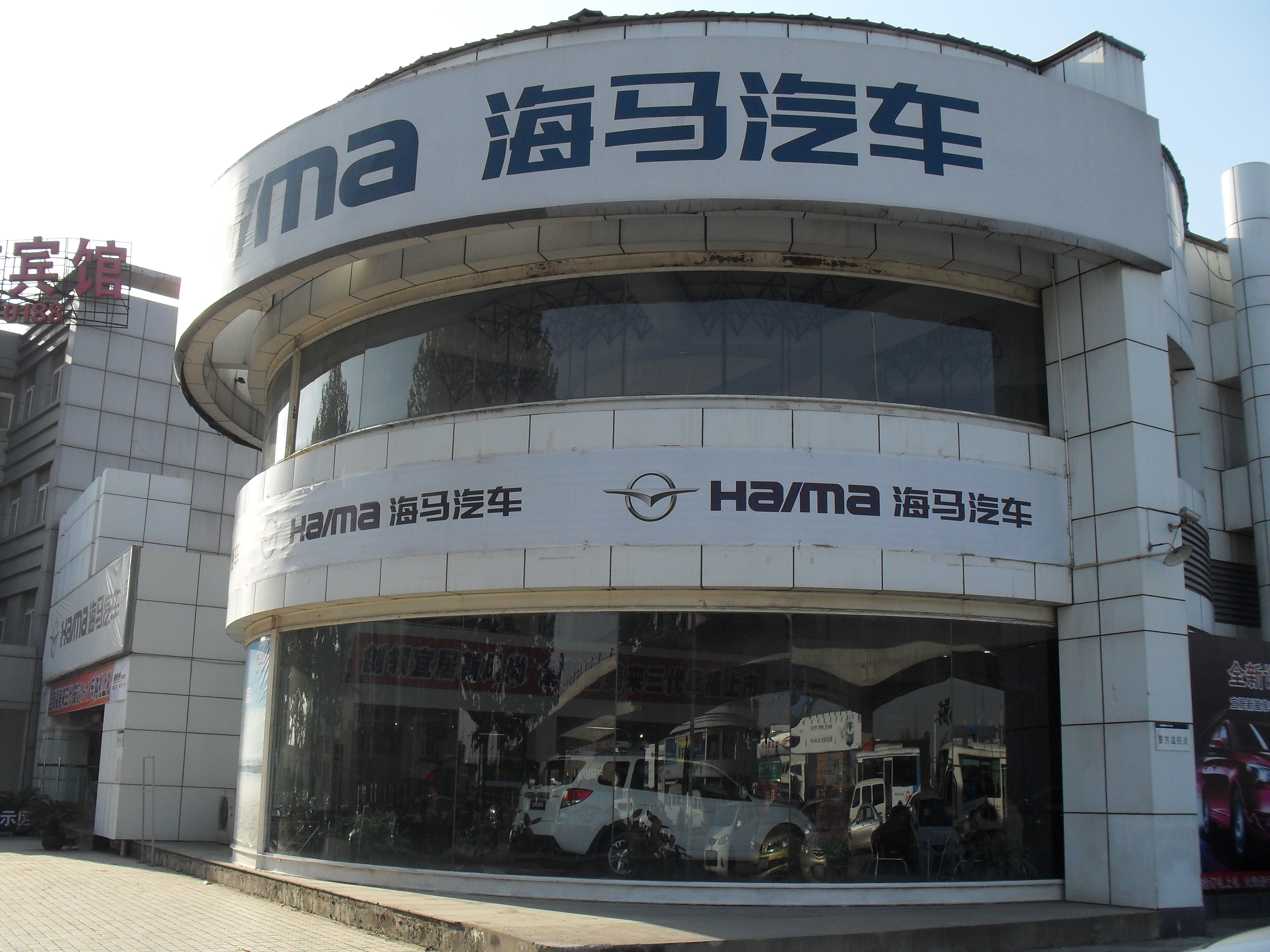
Haima store in Nanjing, China

Haima Automobile Co., Ltd., trading as Haima, is a Chinese automotive manufacturing company based in Haikou, Hainan. Its principal activity is production of passenger cars for other companies.

Haima was founded in 1992 as a joint venture between the Hainan provincial government and Mazda to produce Mazda models for sale in China. In 2006, FAW Group acquired Mazda's share of the venture, although many Haima models still incorporate Mazda technology.

As of 2012 Haima had an annual production capacity of approximately 400,000 vehicles. A total of 157,242 Haima passenger cars were sold in China in 2013, making it the 28th largest-selling car brand in the country in that year (and the 12th largest-selling Chinese brand).

In July 2021, FAW transferred 49% of the shares of FAW Haima to Hainan Development Holdings Co., Ltd. (Hainan Holdings) at no charge. Haima Automobile holds 51% of the shares in FAW Haima, while Hainan Holdings hold 49% of the shares.

== Name ==
The name "Haima" is a portmanteau of "Hainan Mazda" but also literal meaning of "seahorse" in Chinese.

== History ==
The company was founded in January 1992 as Hainan Mazda Motor, a joint venture between the Hainan provincial government and Mazda to produce Mazda models for sale in China. The joint venture arrangement lasted until 2006, when Mazda's share of Hainan Mazda was acquired by FAW Group, and the company became a subsidiary of FAW. While Haima retained the right to make and sell older Mazda models as well as use Mazda technology to underpin self-designed products, it was prohibited from using the Mazda marque.

In 2005, Haima Automobile landed on the A-share capital market. In August 2008 Haima began construction of a third assembly plant in Hainan, with a capacity to build of 100,000 units per year. Its other two plants are located in Haikou, Hainan, and the city of Zhengzhou; both have production capacities of 150,000 whole vehicles per year.

In April 2009 Reuters reported that the company's partnership with Mazda, by then ended, had been established "to receive technological help" and that Haima was selling a car that seemed similar one of Mazda's offerings without consent.

In November 2010 a plant for the assembly of knock-down kits of the Haima 3 was opened in Cherkessk, Russia by Derways Automobile Company.

Announced in December 2016 that Haima to build a manufacturing plant in Bulgaria starting 2018. It will be the second Chinese company to build a factory in Europe following those of Litex Motors, the official distributor of Great Wall Motor.

In 2019, due to the accumulated losses over the past few years, Haima Group successively sold its real estate assets, transferred the equity of Shanghai Haima Automobile Research Institute and Haima Property, etc. Although the company worked hard to control losses in 2020, sales also declined and it once faced a delisting crisis.

In July 2021, FAW transferred 49% of the shares of FAW Haima to Hainan Development Holdings Co., Ltd. (Hainan Holdings) at no charge. Haima Automobile holds 51% of the shares in FAW Haima, while Hainan Holdings hold 49% of the shares.

In 2023, Toyota and Haima Automobile cooperate on fuel cell vehicles, and also launched car rental business in Hainan.

=== Corporate Leadership ===
- Ming Qin (Chief Executive Officer since March 2023)
- Zhu Jing (Chairmen since June 2019)

=== Past Chairmens ===
- Zhu Jing (1998–2013)
- Qin Quanquan (2013–2019)

== Products ==
=== Current products ===
- Haima 8S CUV
- Haima 7X/7X-E MPV
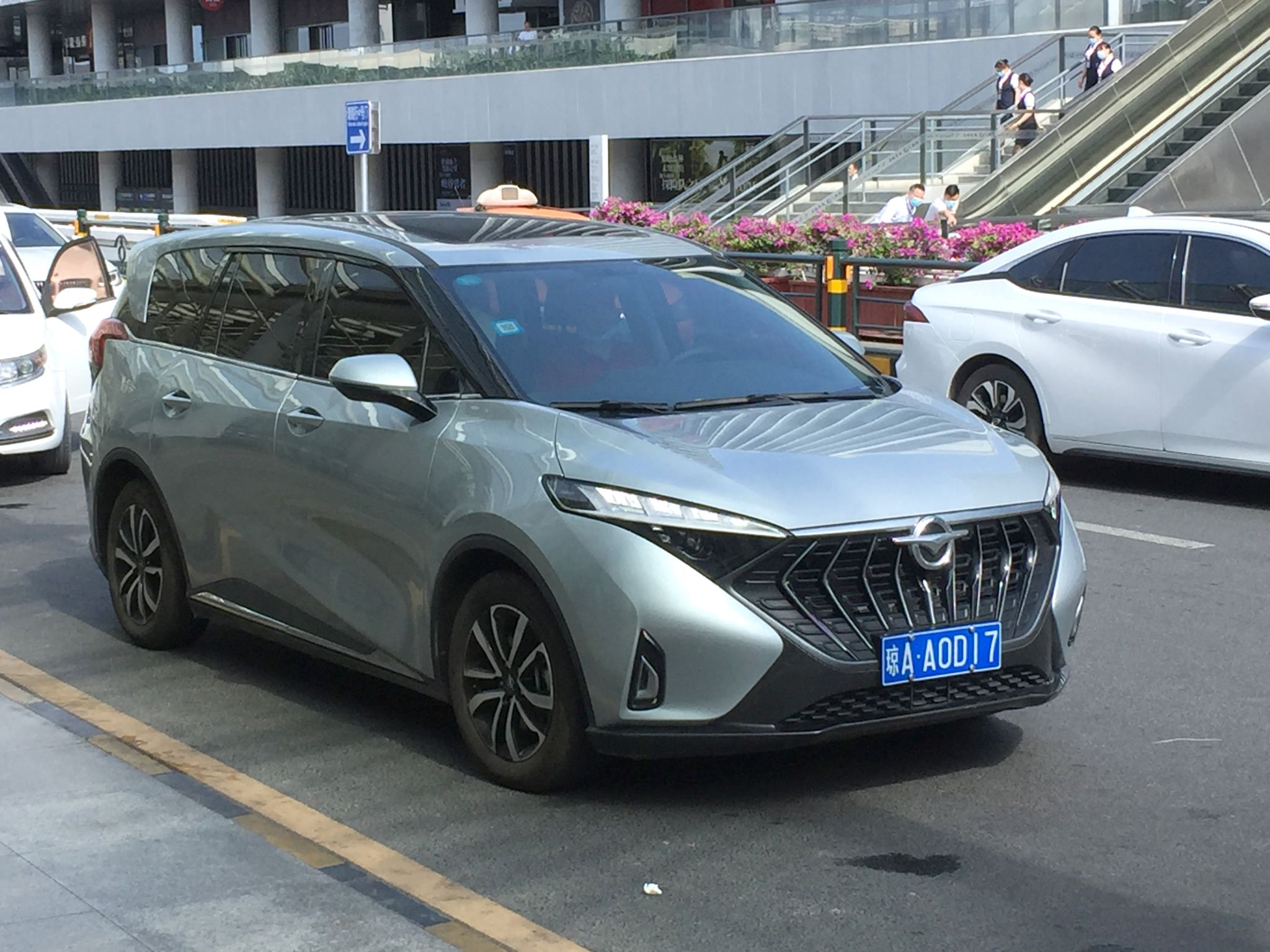
Haima 7X

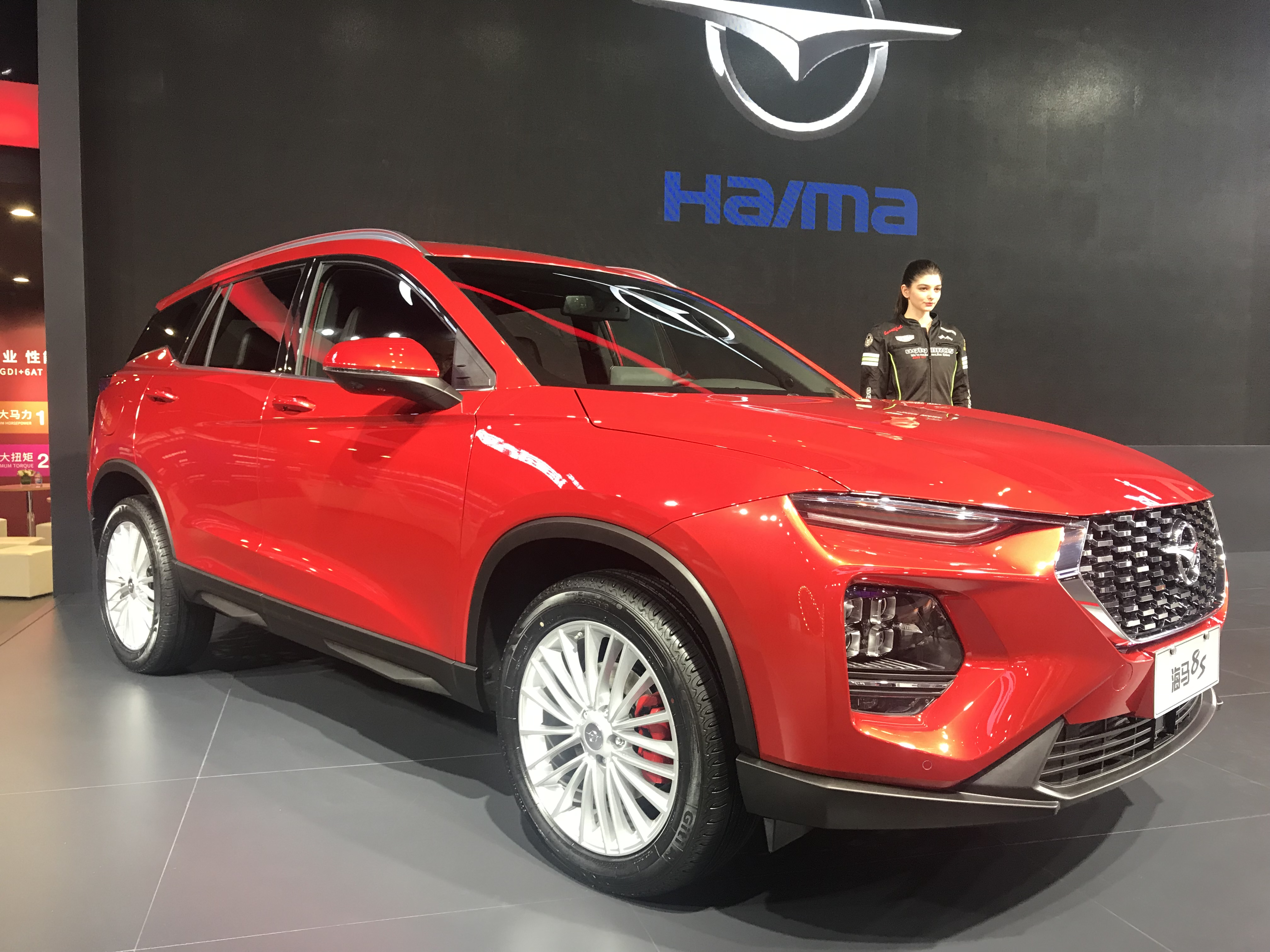
Haima 8S

=== Former products ===
Vehicles formerly produced by Haima include:

- Haima 1 "Aishang" (爱尚) EV- Only electric version still in production.
- Haima Fstar microvan
- Haima 6P PHEV CUV
- Haima M3 sedan (1.5 litre)
- Haima M5 sedan (1.5 and 1.6 litre)
- Haima M6 sedan
- Haima M8 sedan (1.8 and 2.0 litre)
- Haima Freema (a rebadged Mazda Premacy)
- Haima S5 CUV (1.6 litre)
- Haima S5 Young CUV
- Haima S7 CUV (2.0 litre)- (Previous Haima 7)
- Haima F7 MPV- (Previous Haima V70)
- Mazda 929
- Haima HMC6450 minivan (a van based on the Mazda MPV (LV) series)
- Mazda 6440 minivan
- Haima 3 hatchback (1.6 litre)
- Haima 3 sedan (1.6 litre)
- Haima 2 hatchback (1.3 and 1.5 litre)
- Haima 1 "Aishang" (爱尚) (1.0 litre)
- Haima 1 "Prince" (王子) (1.0 litre)
- Haima HMC6470L station wagon (a rebadged Mazda Luce)
- Haima Family/ Happin(CA7130) sedan / Family VS sedan / hatchback(1.6 litre) (a rebadged Mazda 323/Mazda Familia)
- Haima CA6430M hatchback
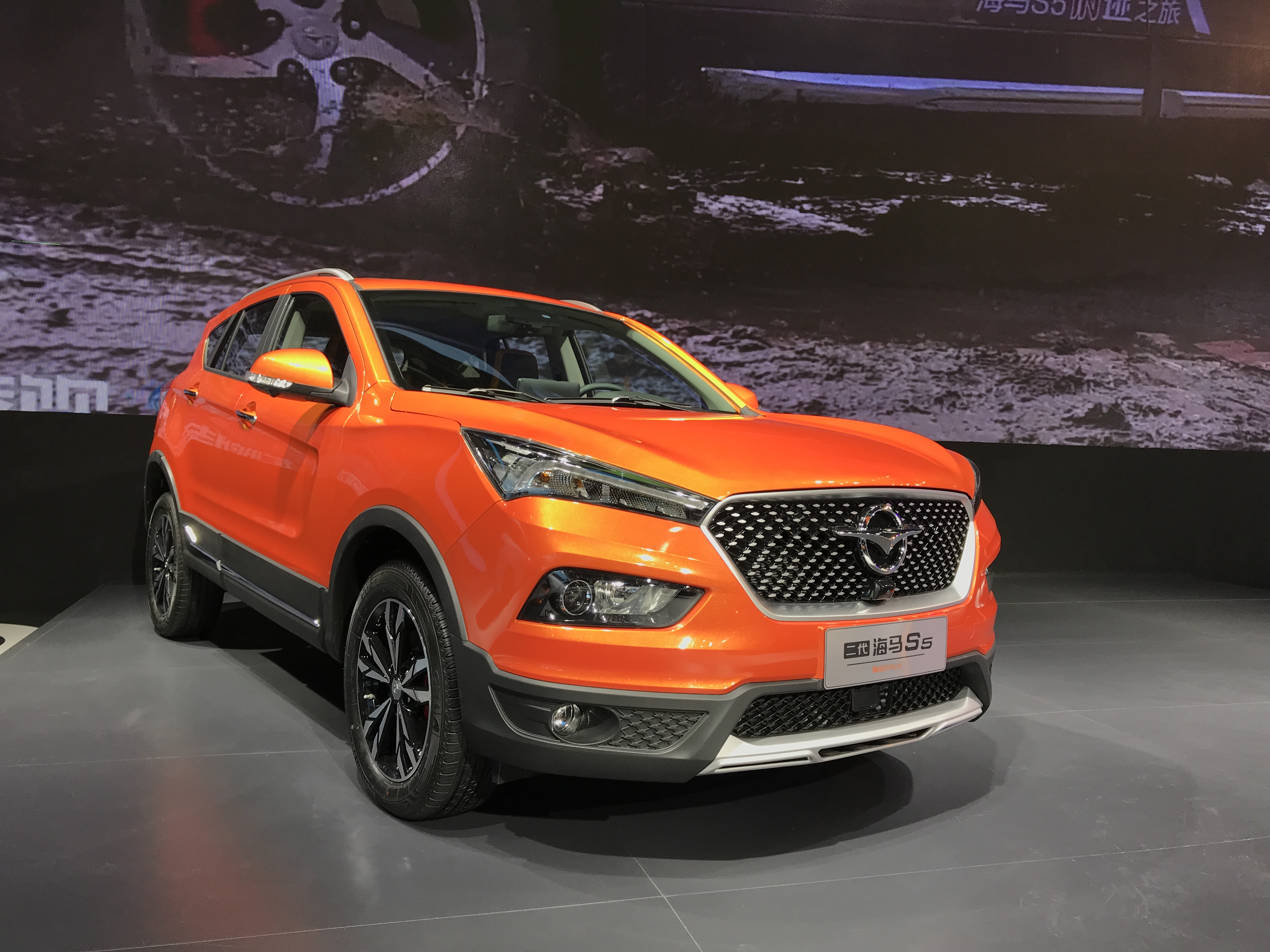
Haima S5/6P

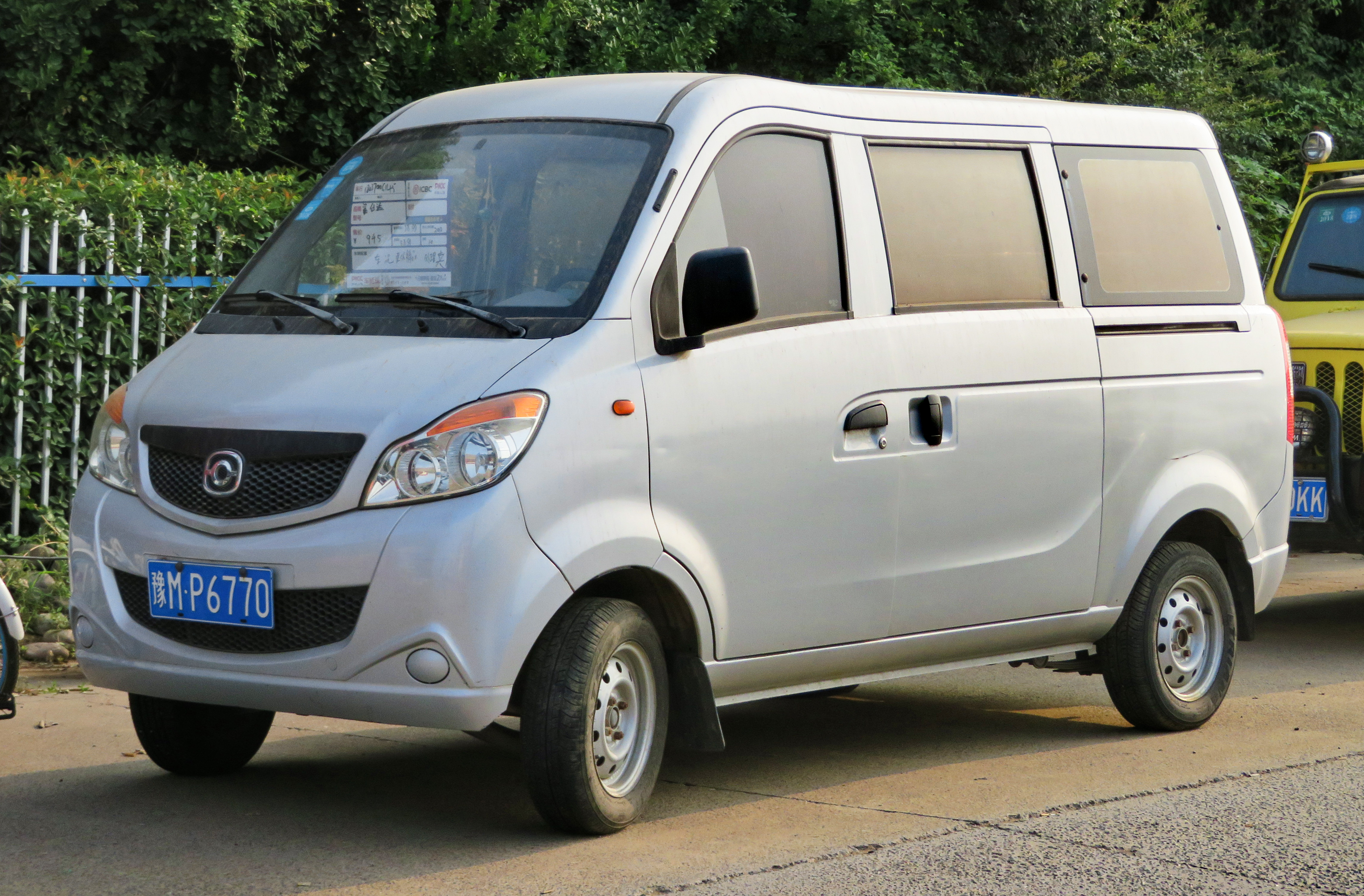
Haima Fstar

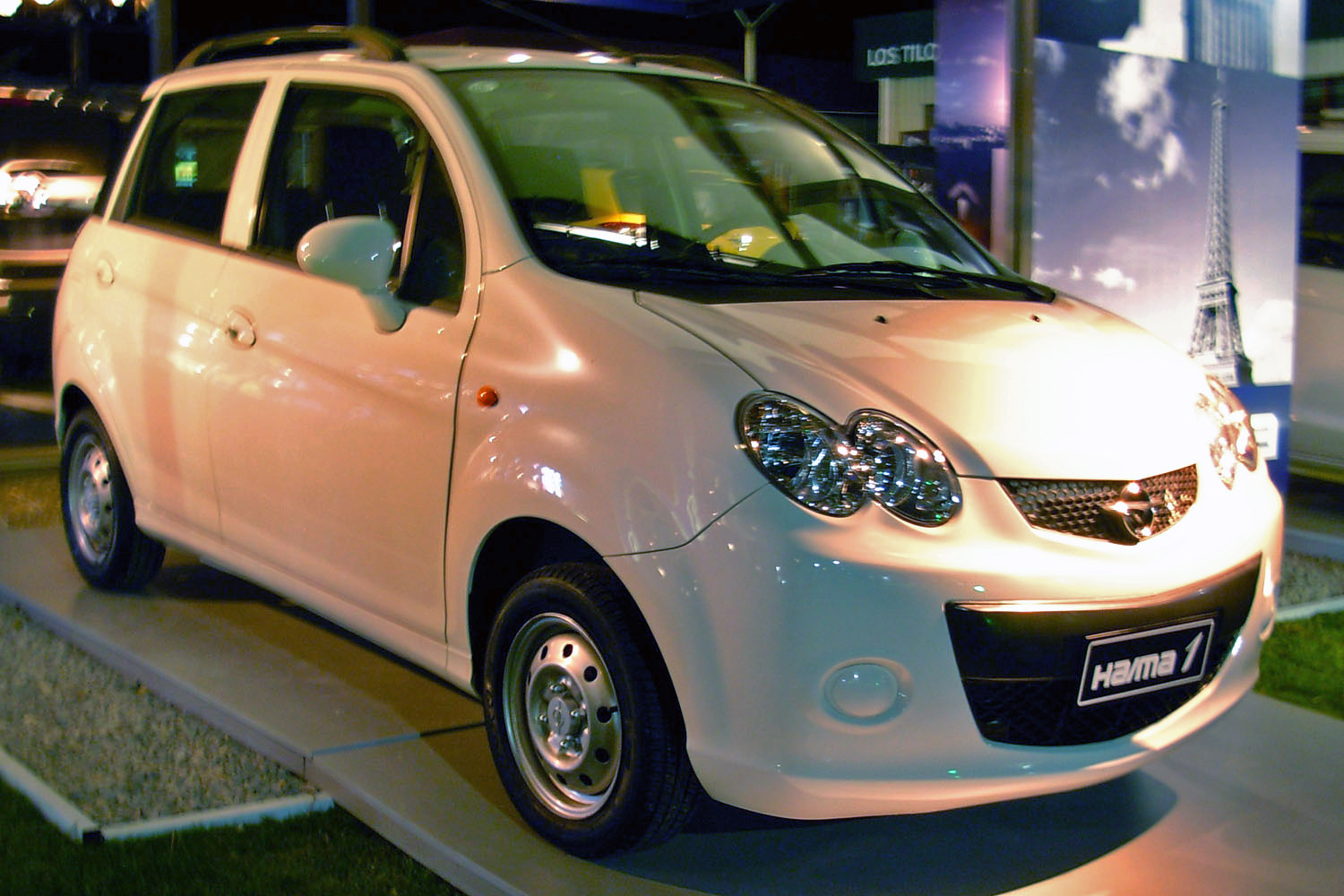
Haima 1

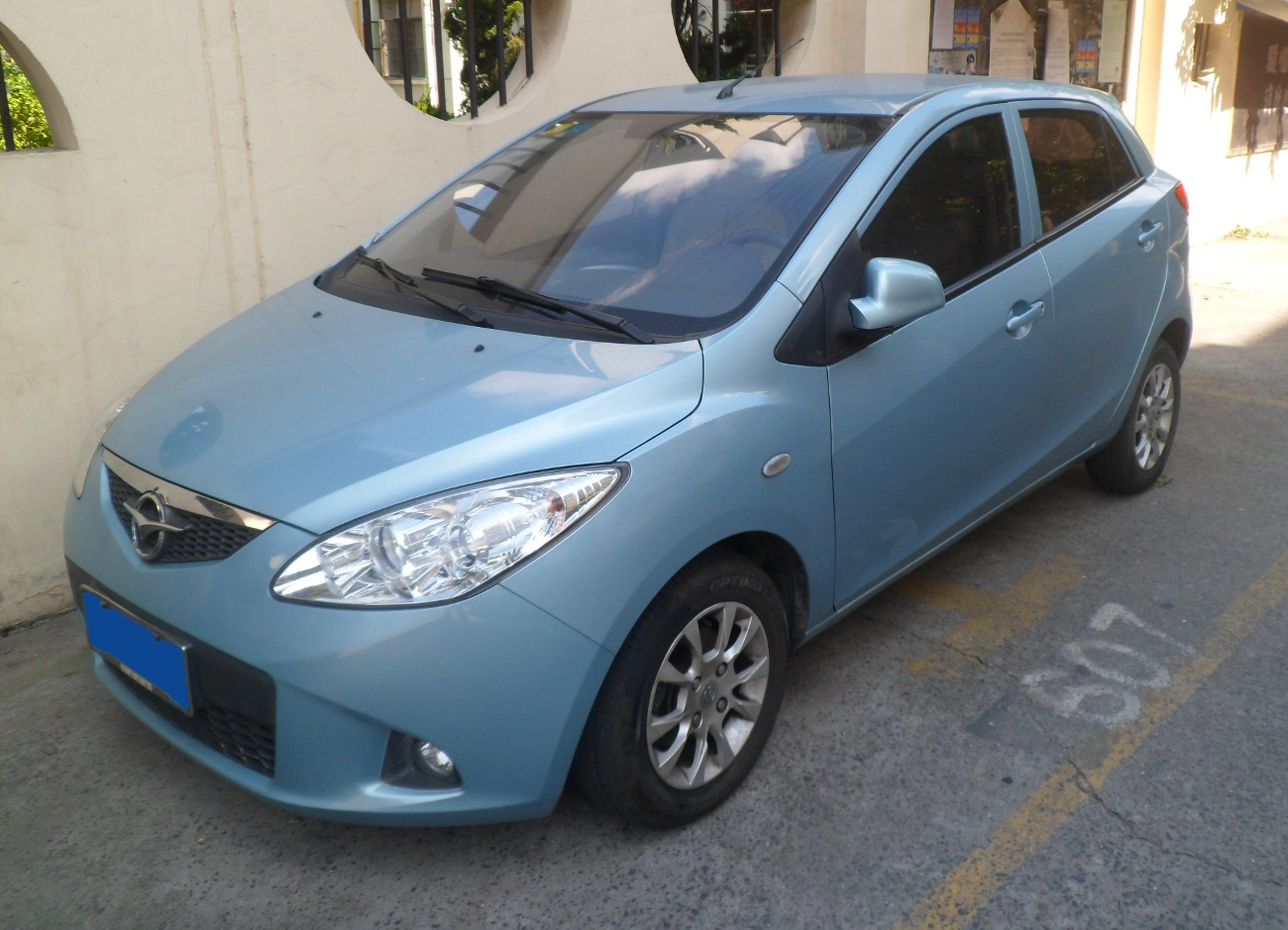
Haima 2

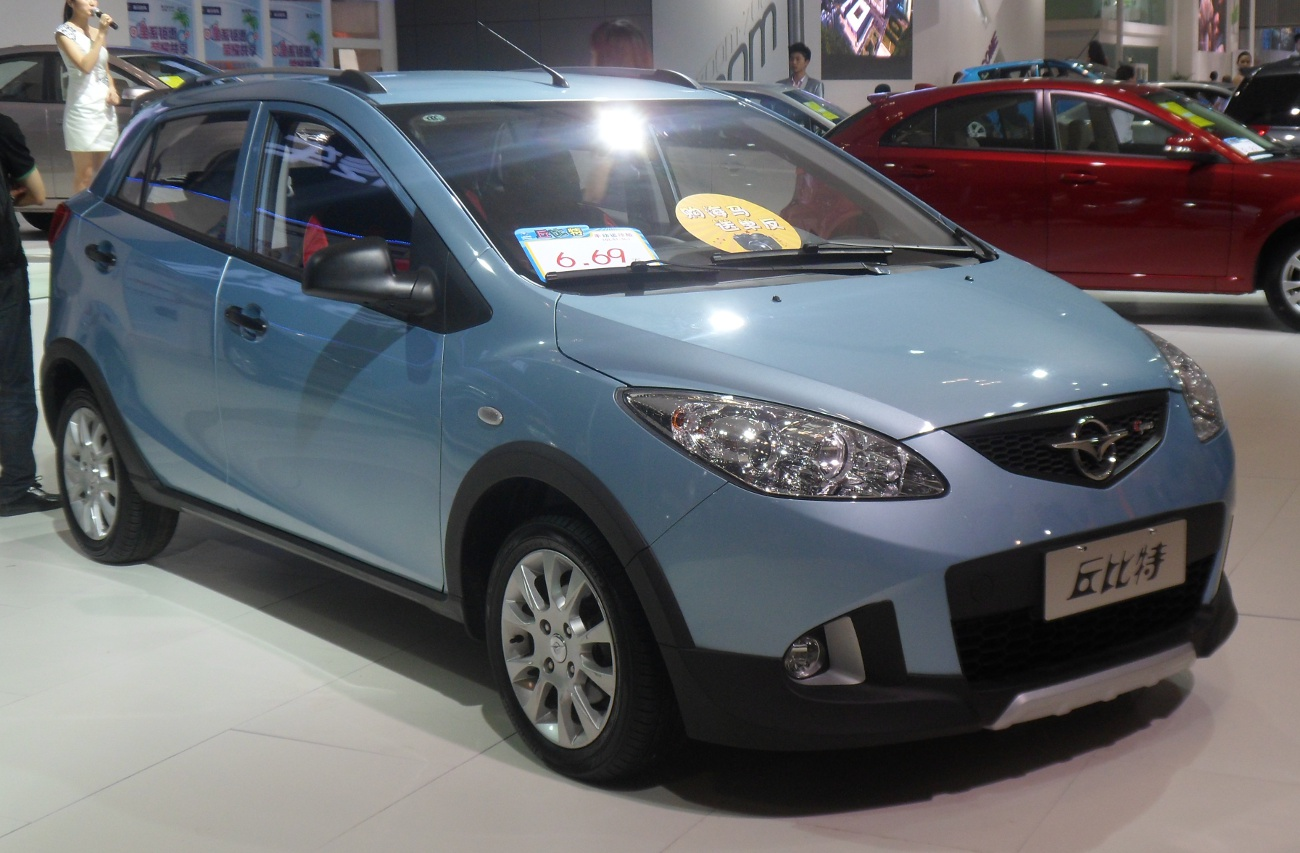
Haima 2 C-Sport

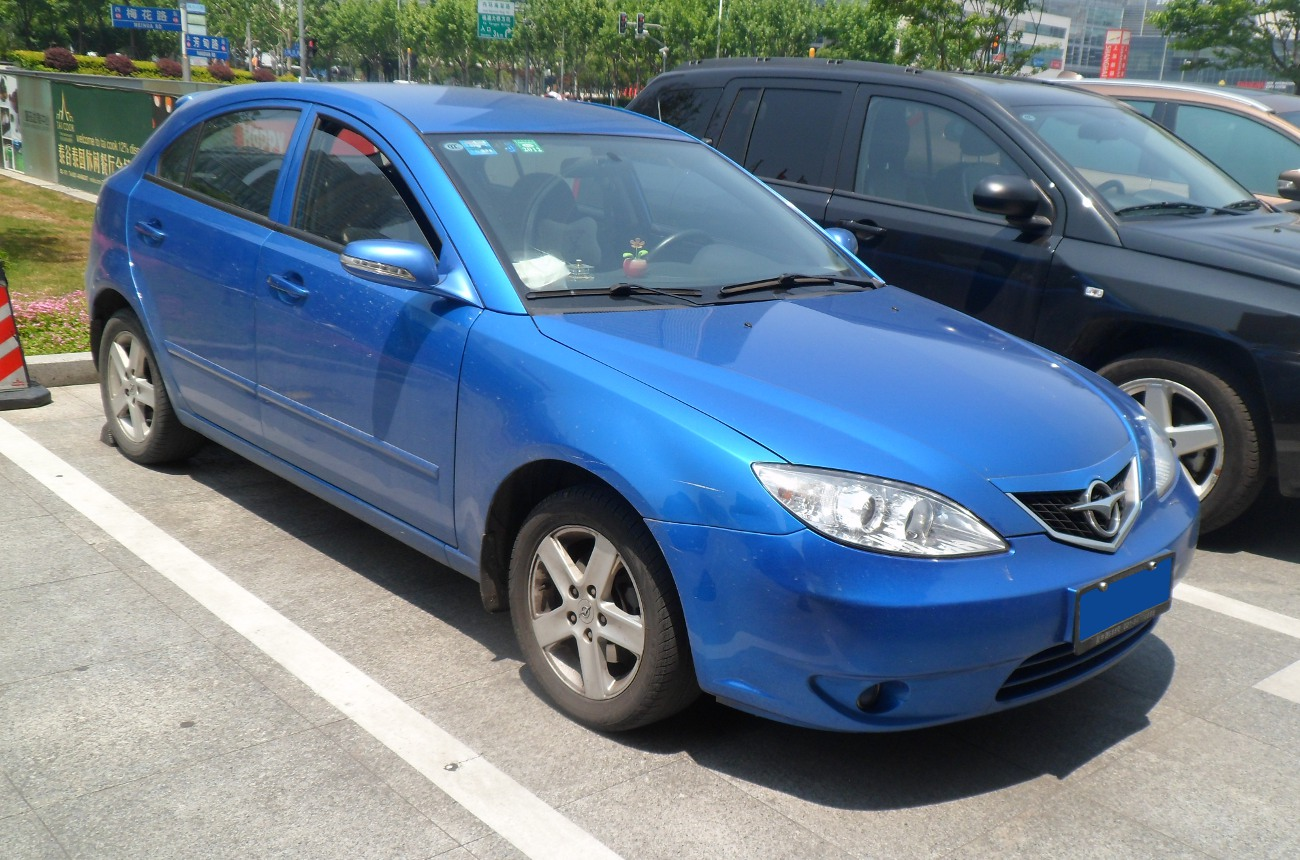
Haima 3 Hatchback

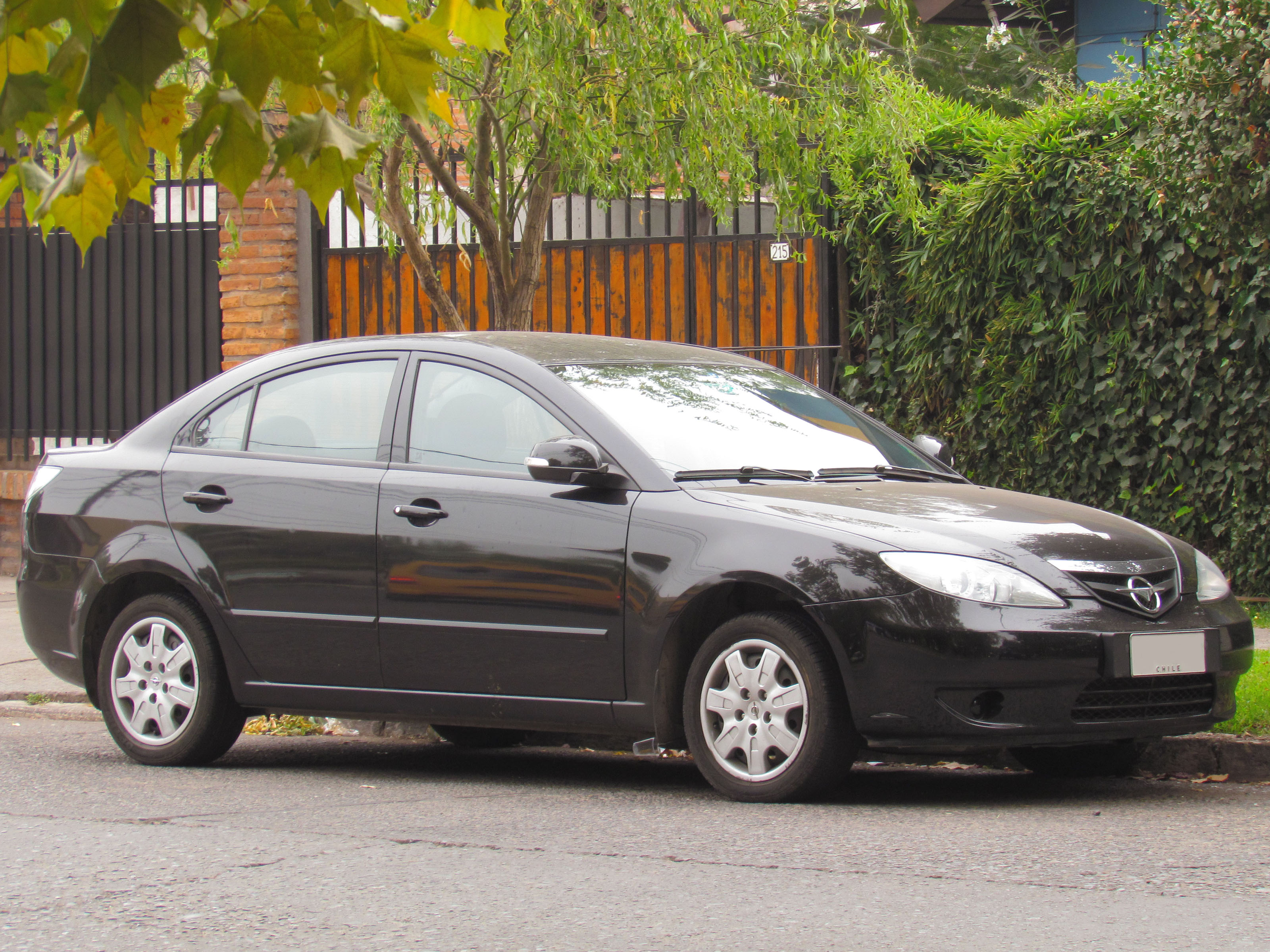
Haima 3 Sedan

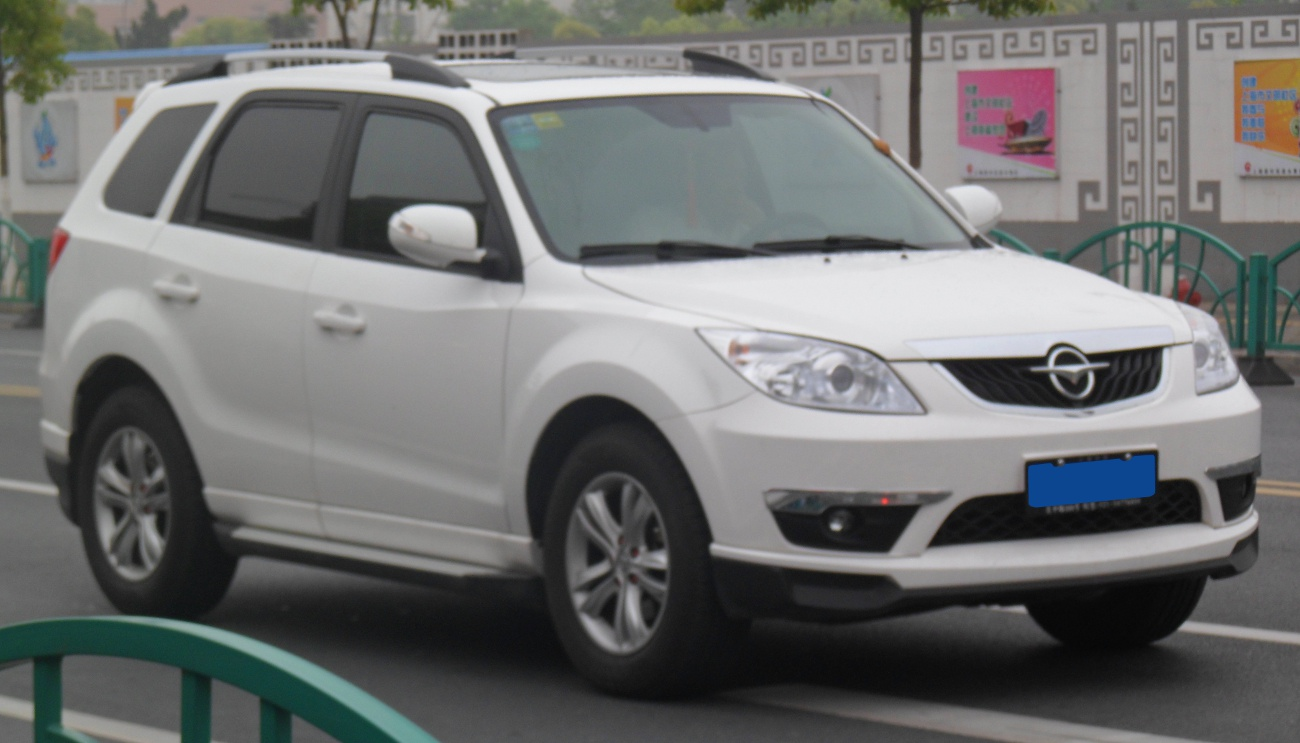
Haima 7

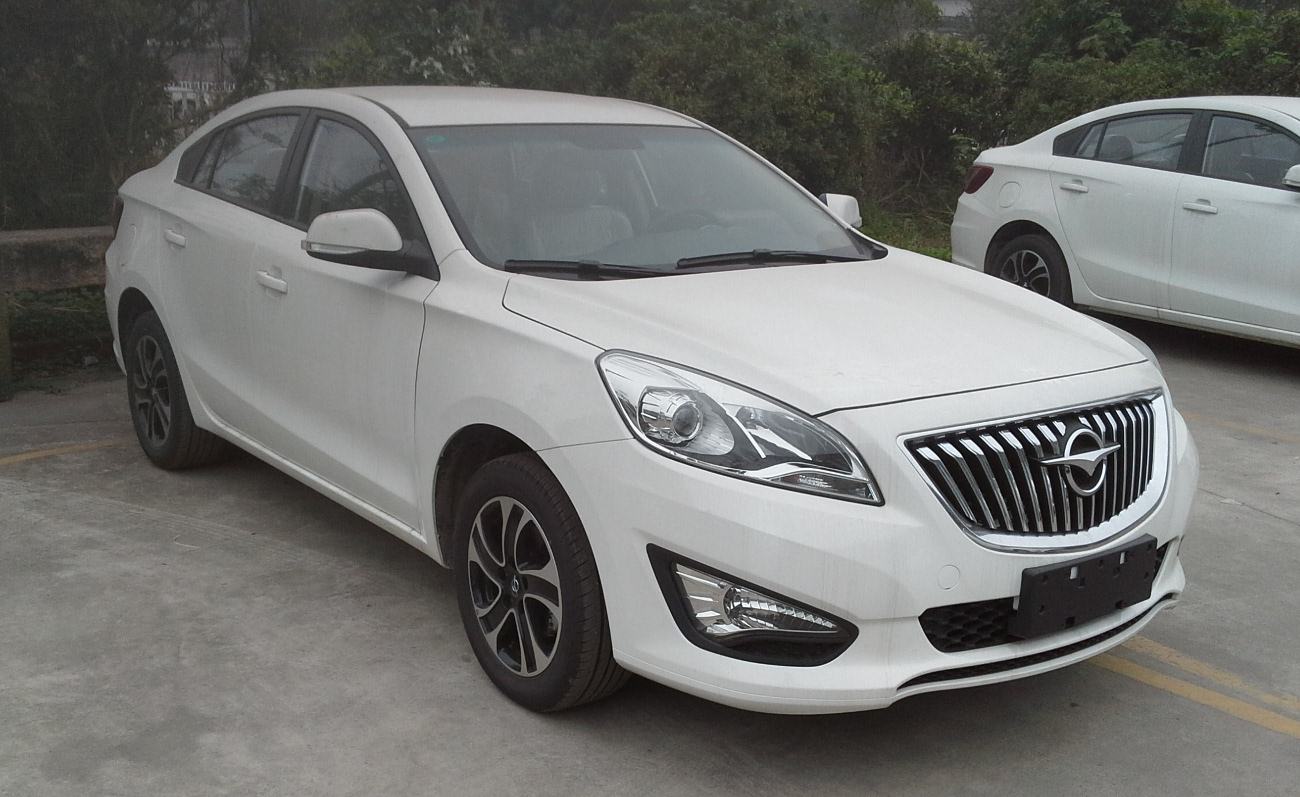
Haima Family

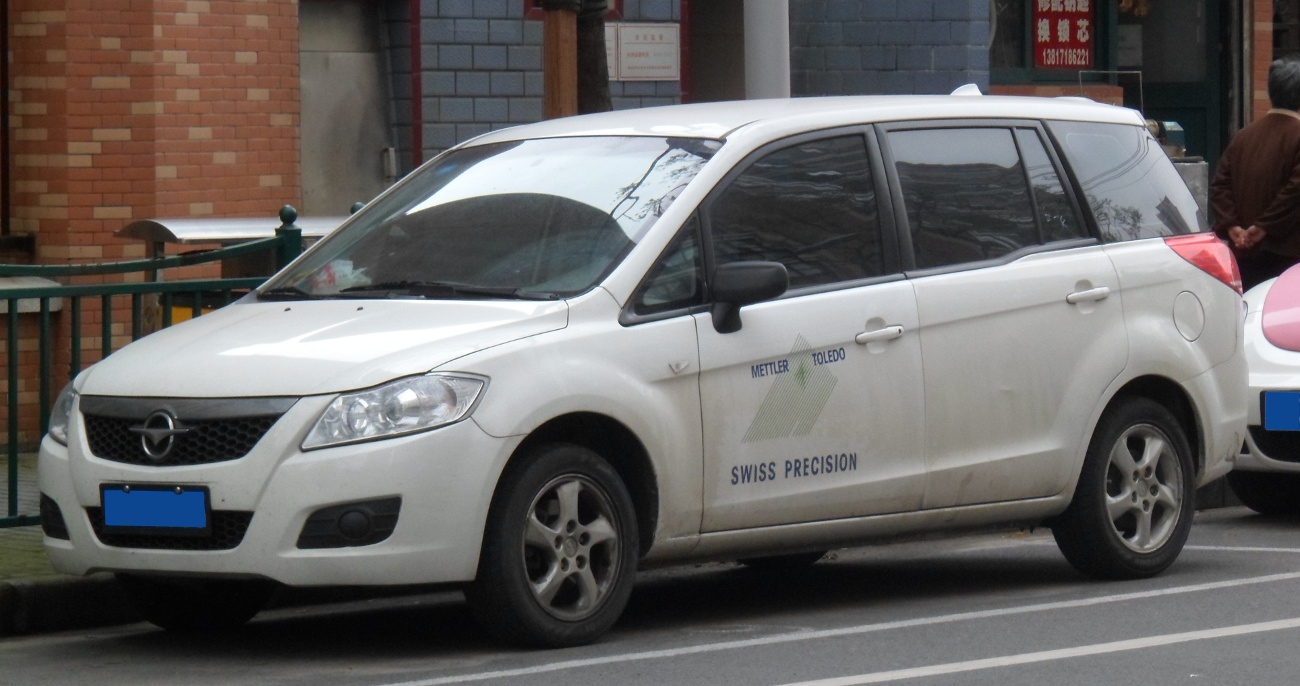
Haima Freema

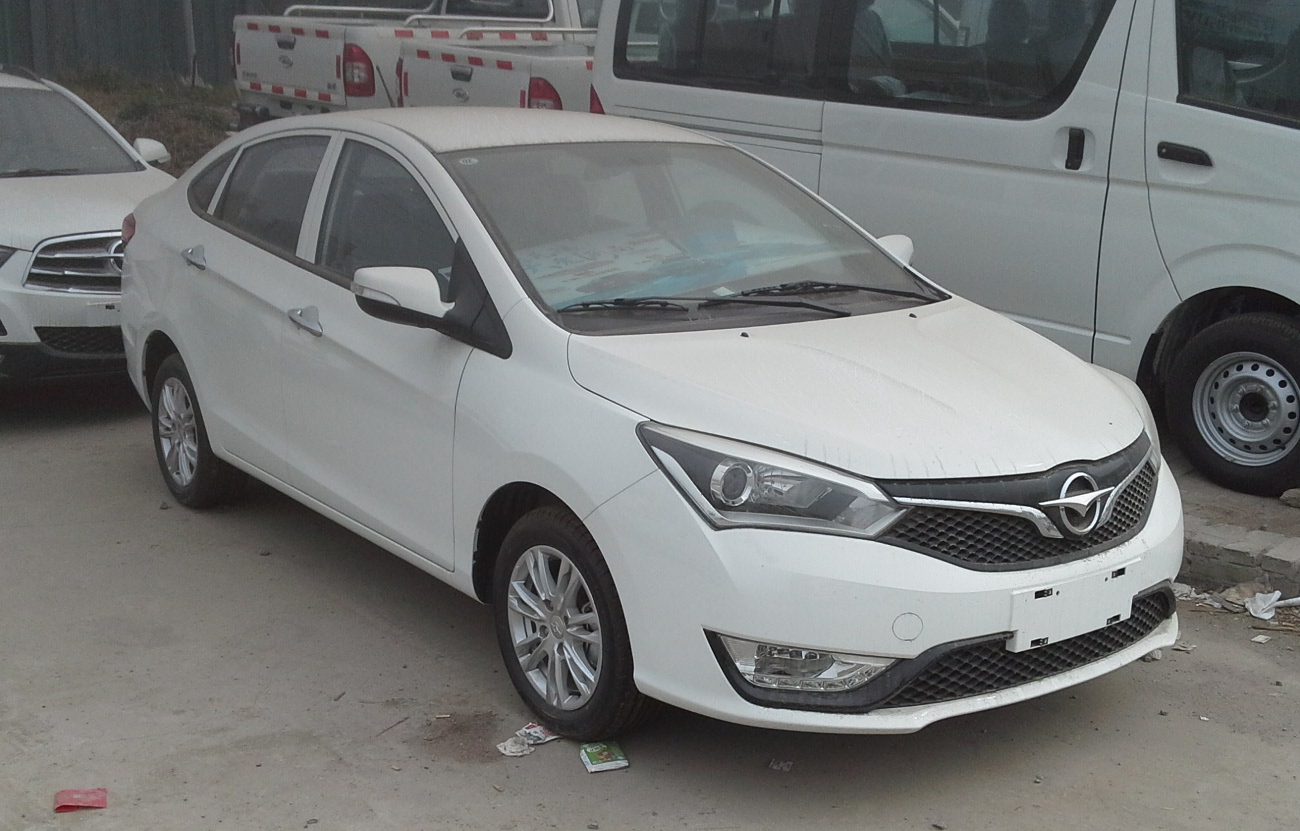
Haima M3

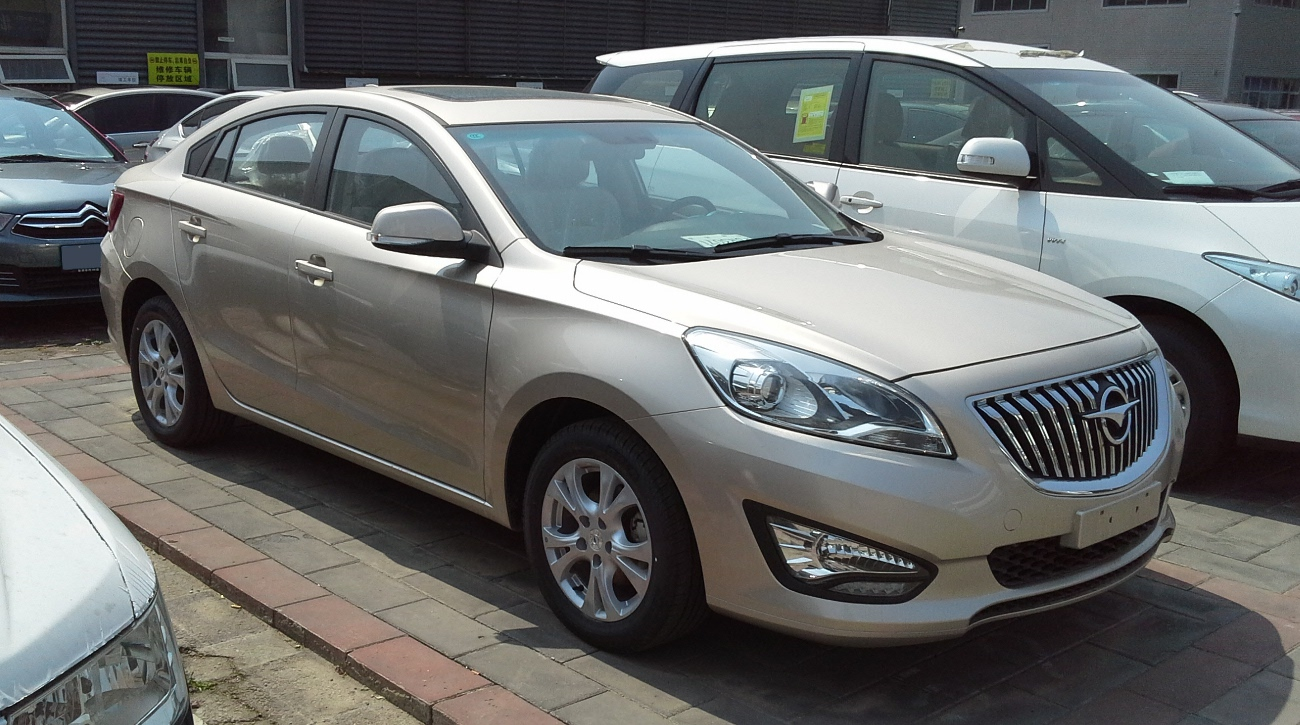
Haima M5

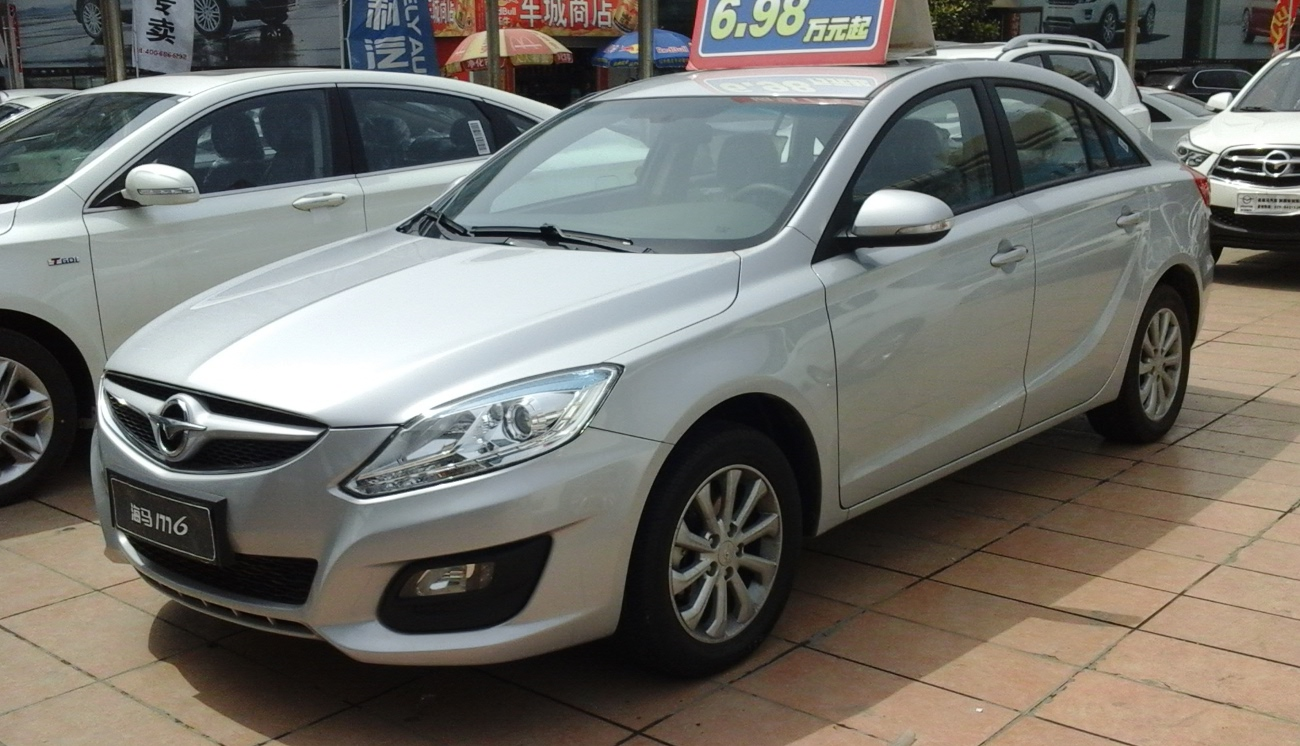
Haima M6

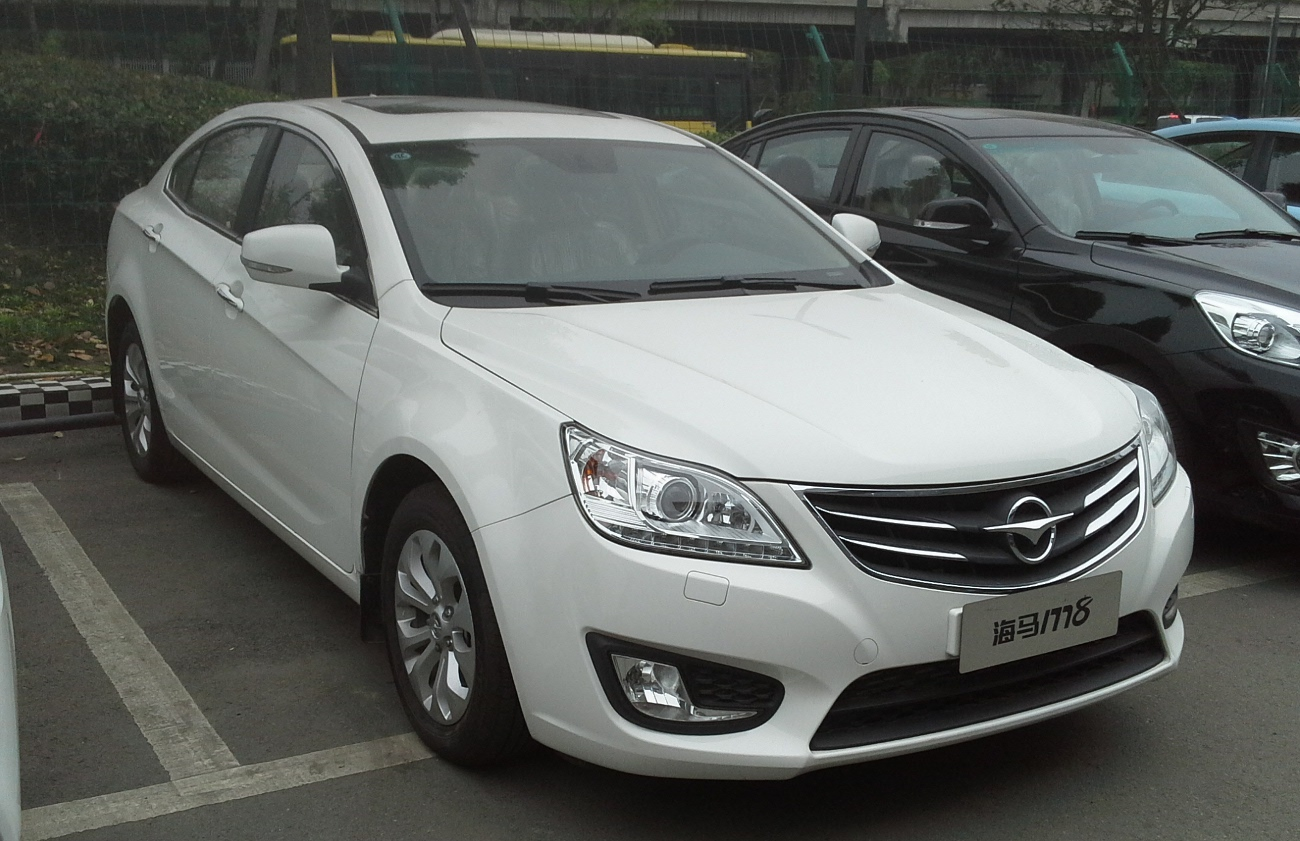
Haima M8

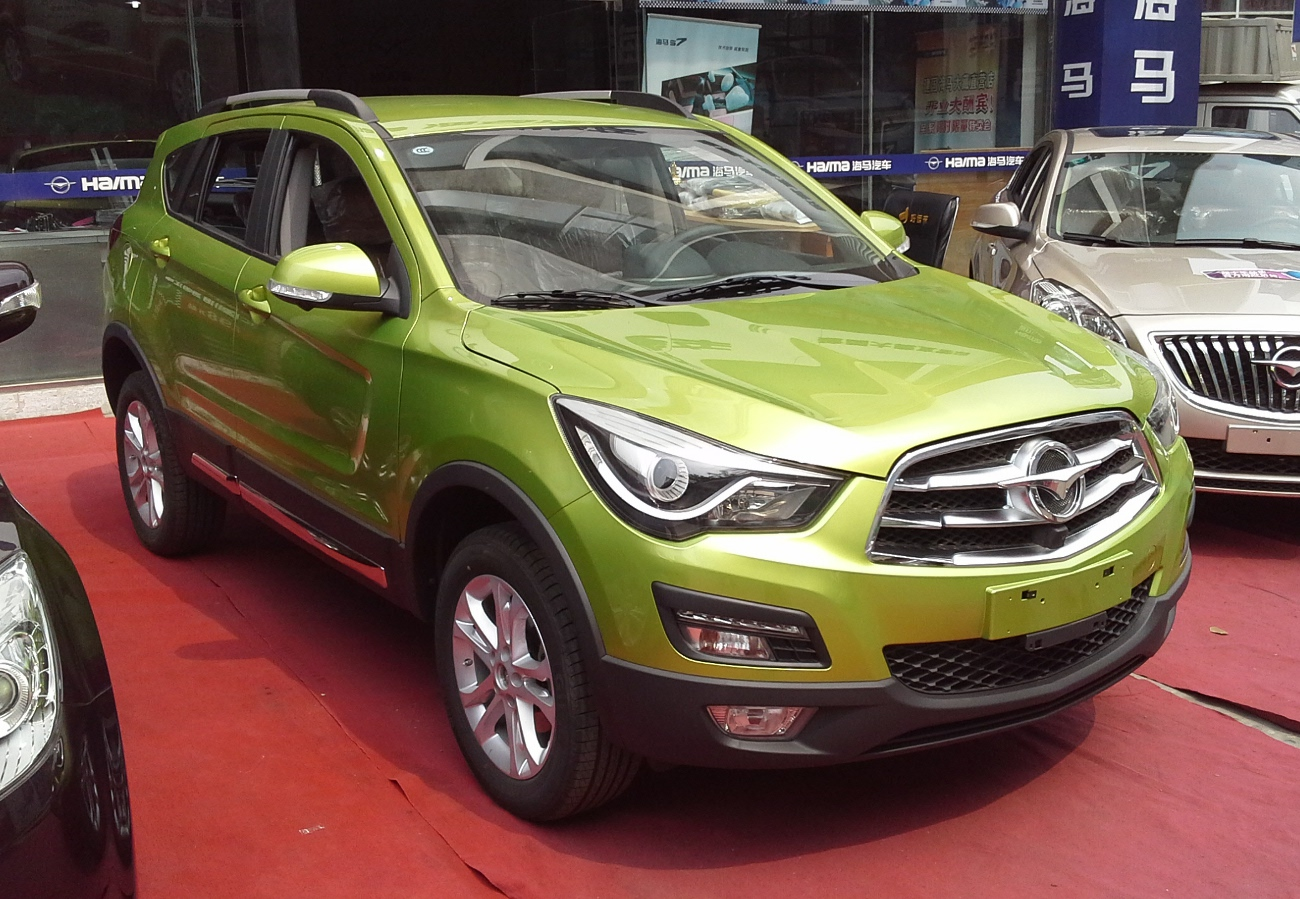
Haima S5

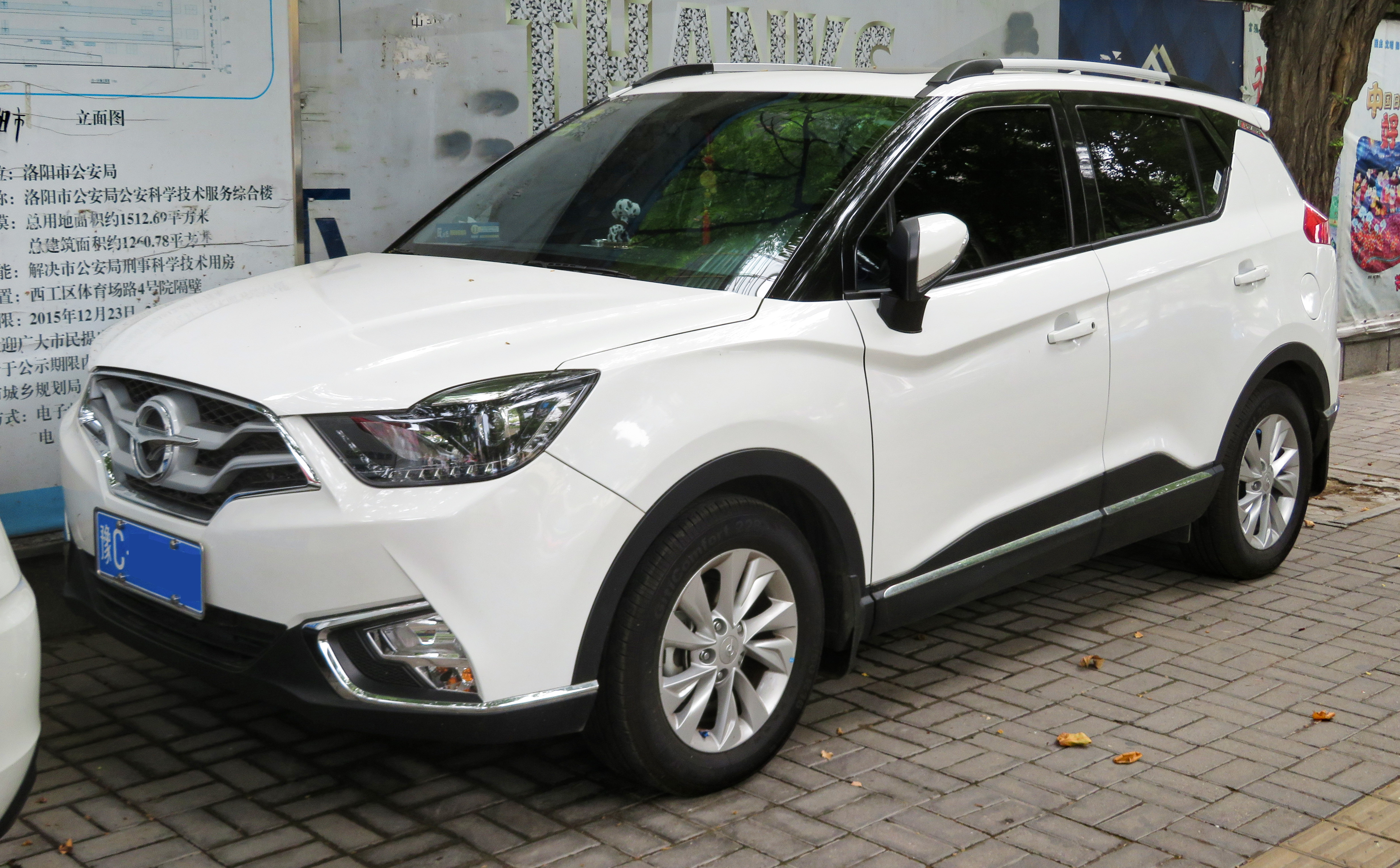
Haima S5 Young

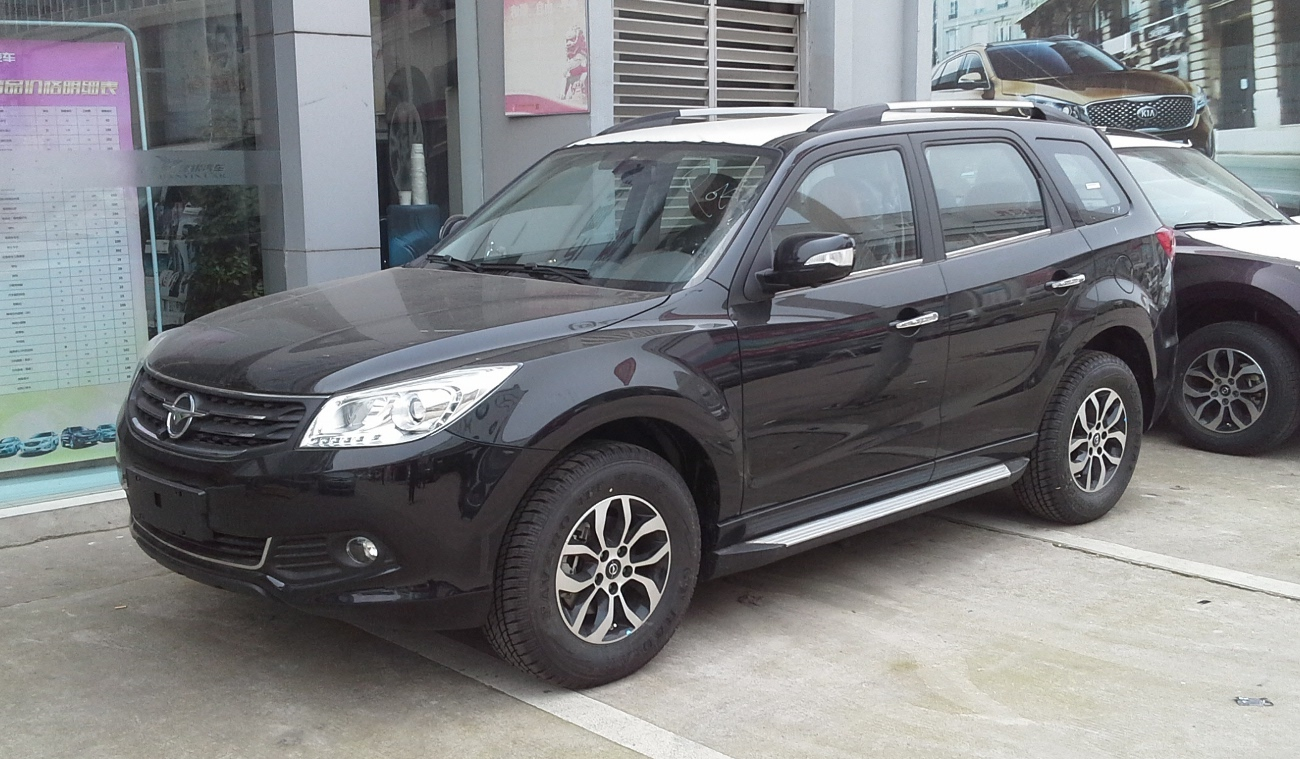
Haima S7

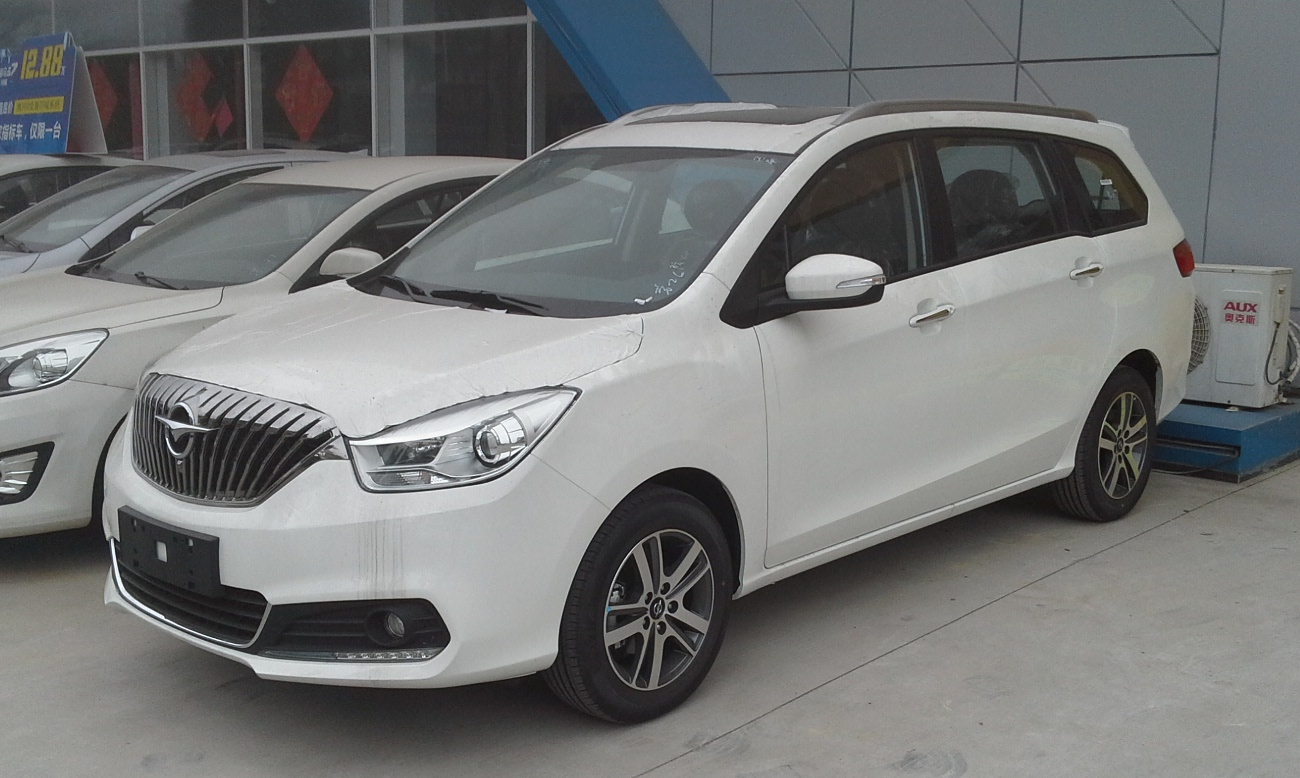
Haima V70

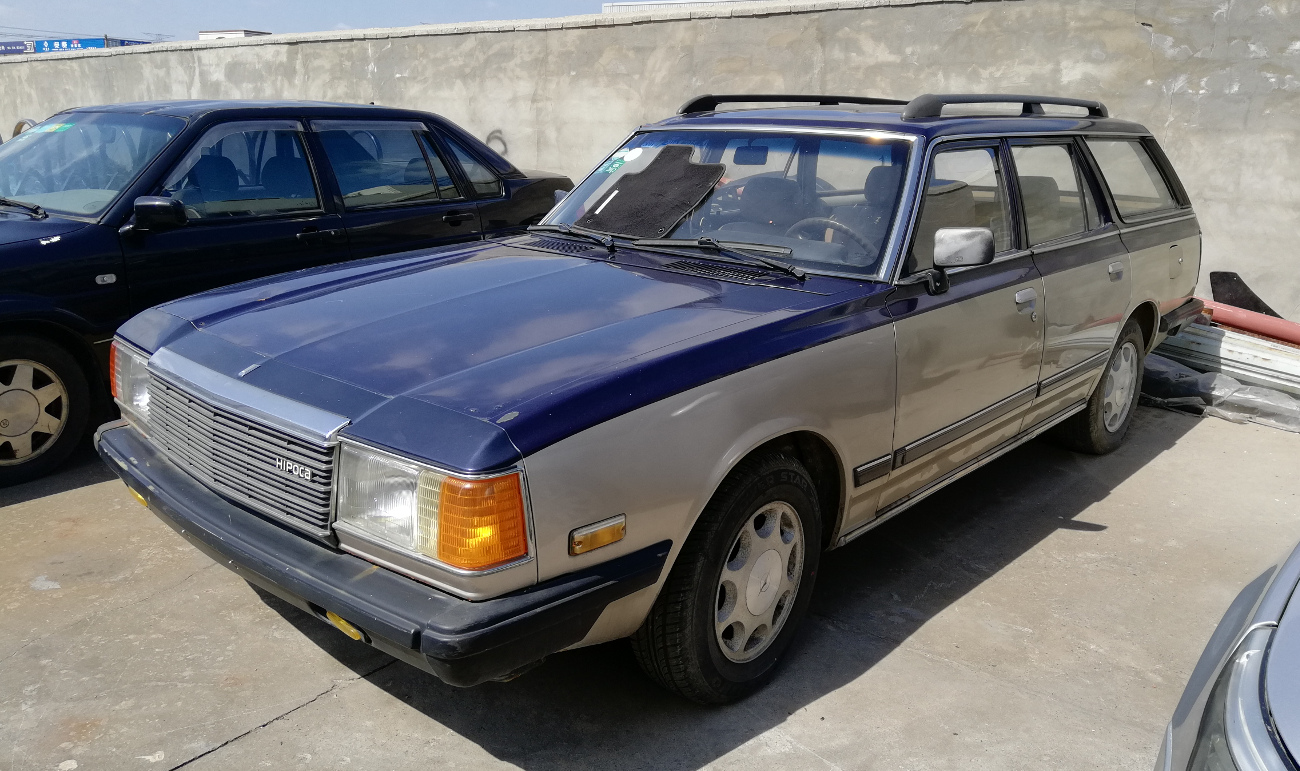
Hainan-Mazda HMC6470

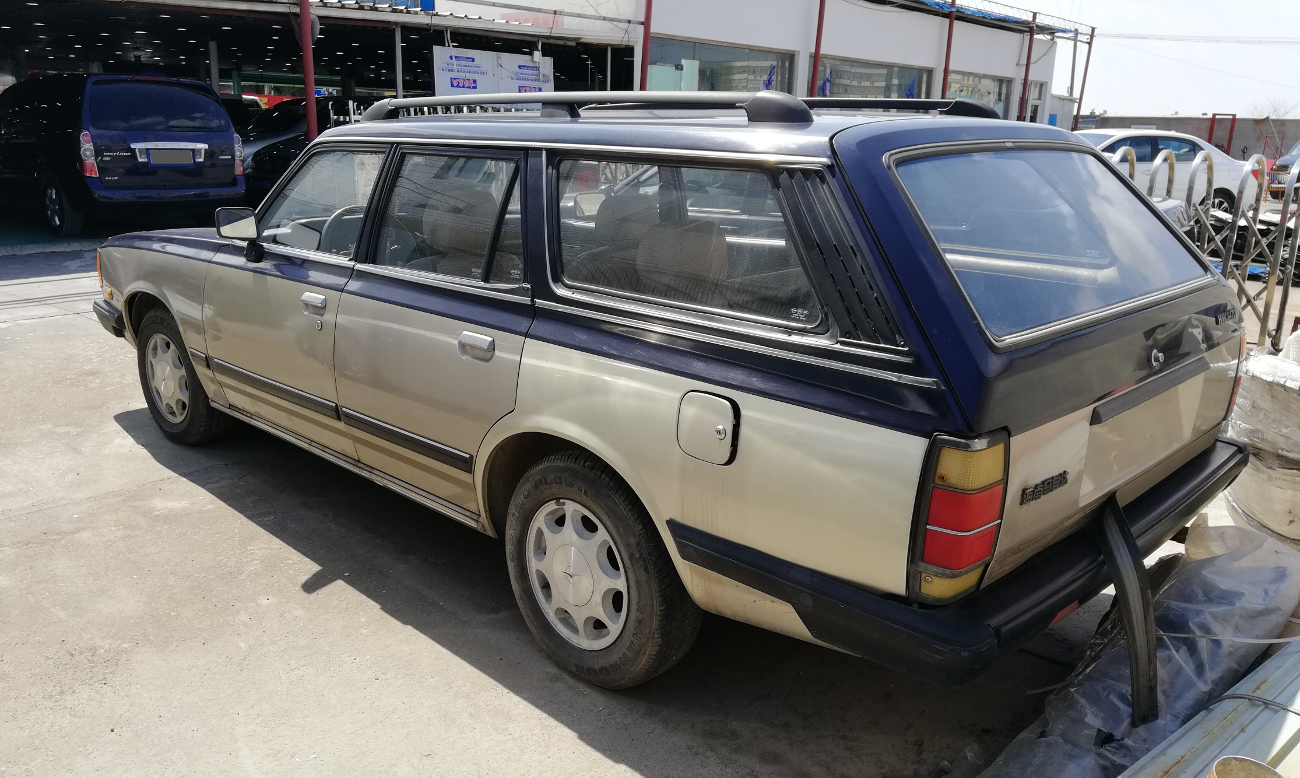
Hainan-Mazda HMC6470

=== OEM products ===
Between 2018 and 2021, Haima Automobile produced some early models for XPeng at its Zhengzhou factory.

- Xpeng IDENTY X
- Xpeng G3
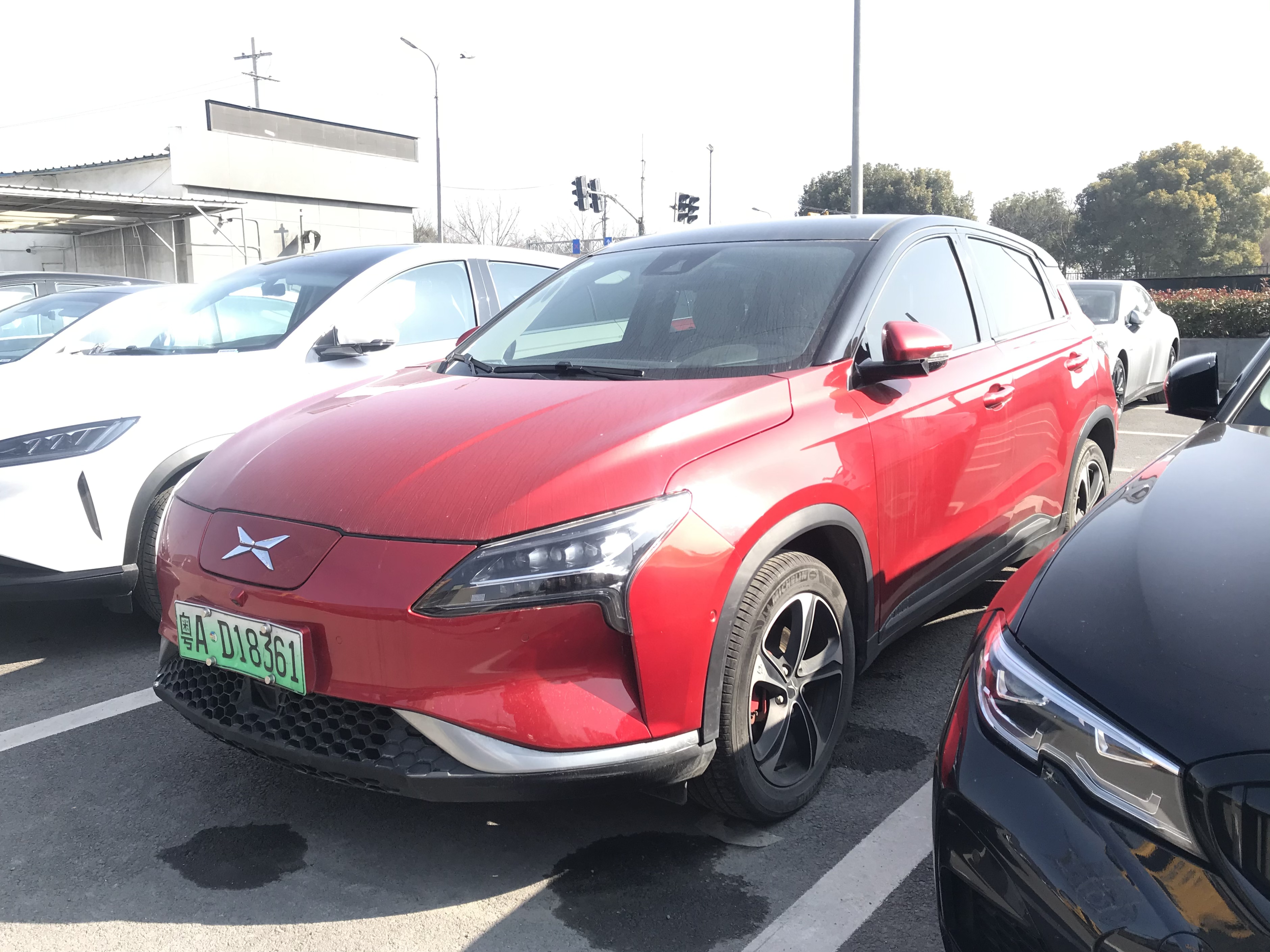
Xpeng Identity X

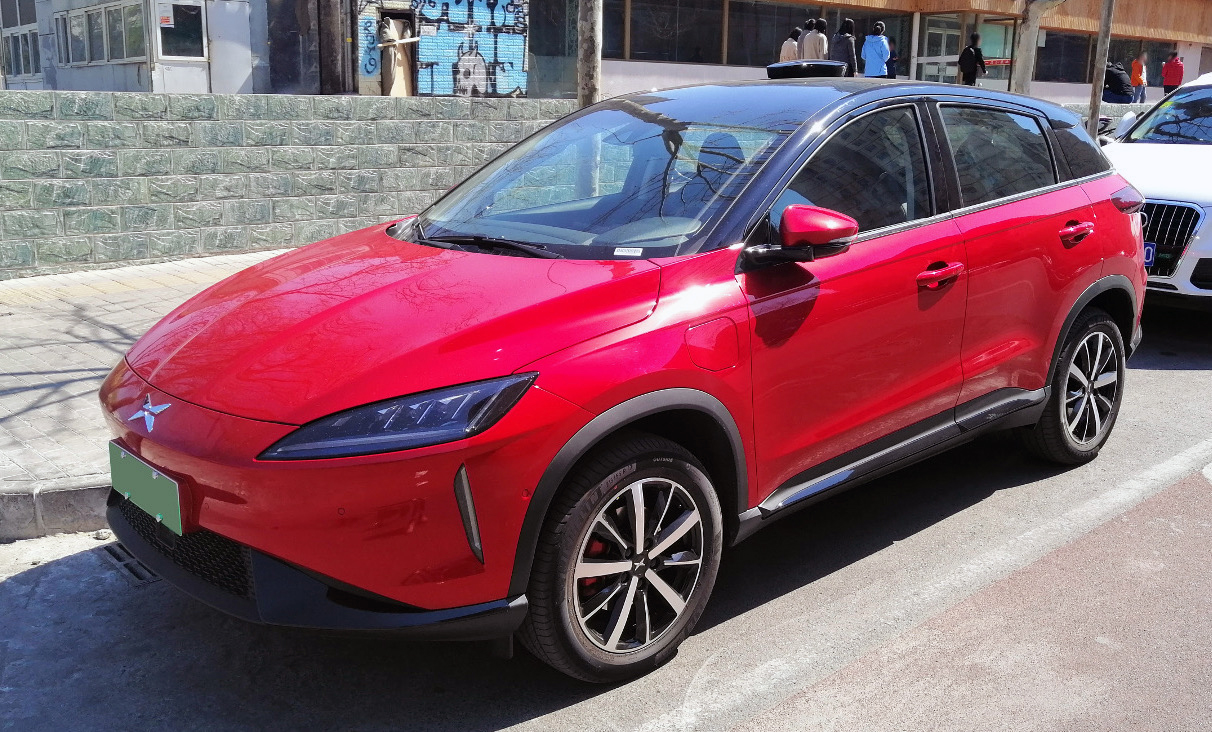
XPeng G3

== Logo ==
Haima's logo represents a mythical bird flying away from a rising sun.

== Motorsport ==
Haima competes in the China Touring Car Championship through the Haima Family team.

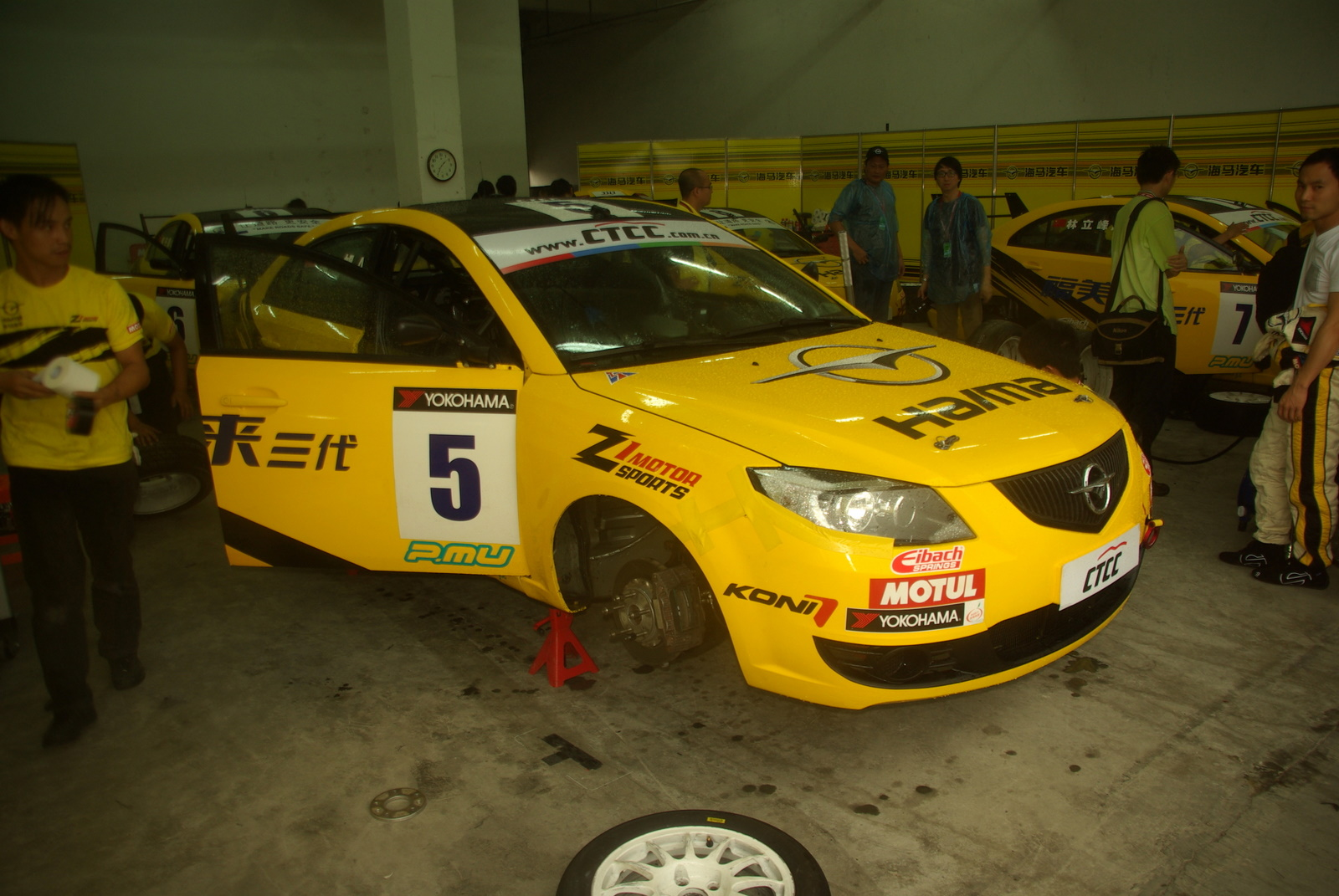
A Haima touring car

== Sales ==
Calendar year	Total sales
2009	118,000
2010	200,000
2011	230,000
