= Haima S5 Young =

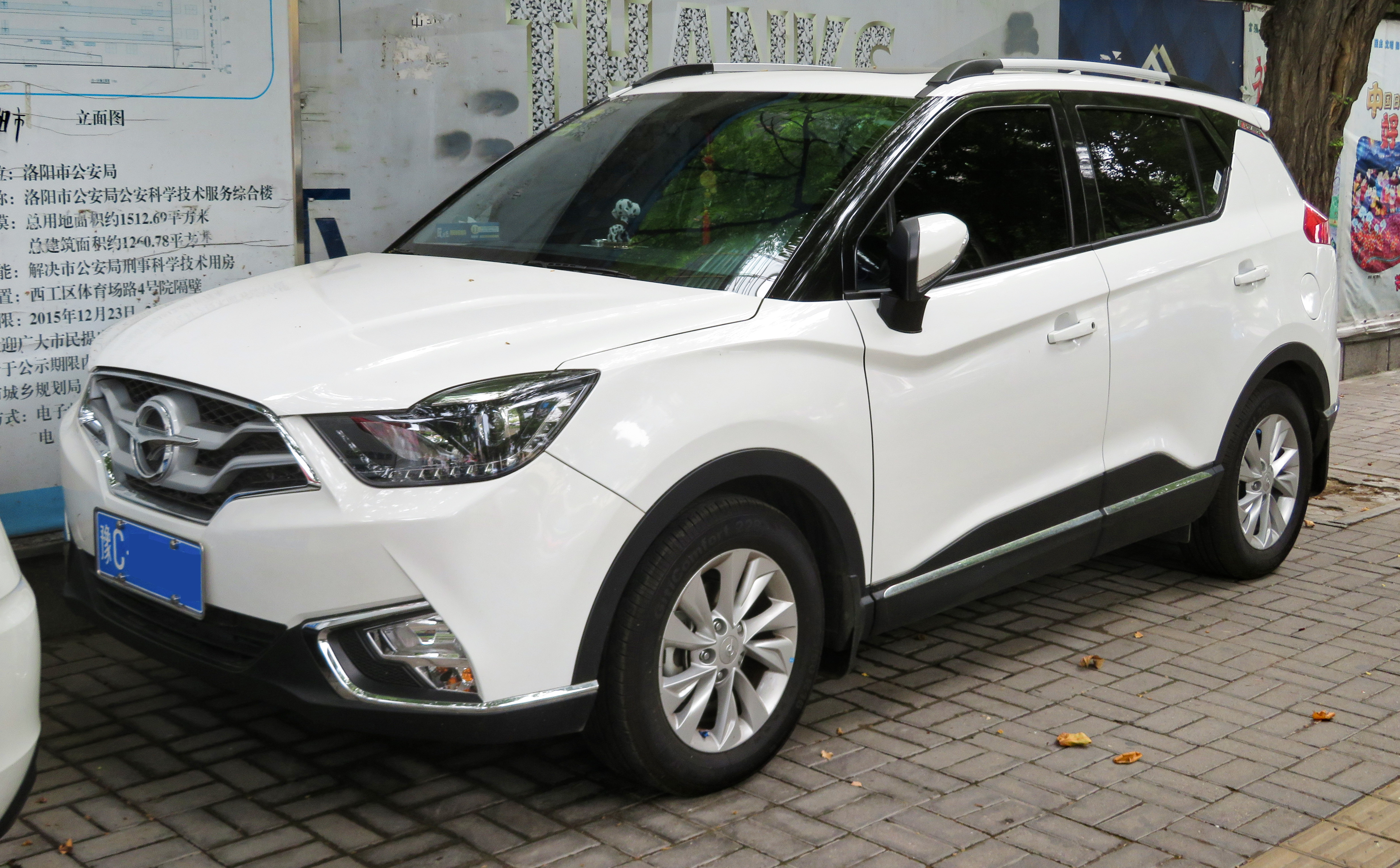
- Haima S5 Young in Luoyang

Overview
- Manufacturer: Haima Automobile
- Production: 2017–2018
- Model years: 2017–2018
- Assembly: China: Hainan

Body and chassis
- Class: Subcompact crossover SUV
- Body style: 5-door SUV
- Layout: front-wheel-drive

Powertrain
- Engine: 1.5 L GN15-TF turbo I4 (gasoline); 1.6 L GN16-VF1 I4 (gasoline)
- Transmission: 5-speed manual; CVT

Dimensions
- Wheelbase: 2,560 mm (100.8 in)
- Length: 4,195 mm (165.2 in)
- Width: 1,765 mm (69.5 in)
- Height: 1,637 mm (64.4 in)

The Haima S5 Young is a subcompact crossover SUV produced by Haima Automobile positioned under the Haima S5 compact crossover. Haima S5 Young SUV is smaller than the Haima S5 SUV, stands on a different platform, uses different engines, and sells in a lower segment.

== Overview ==
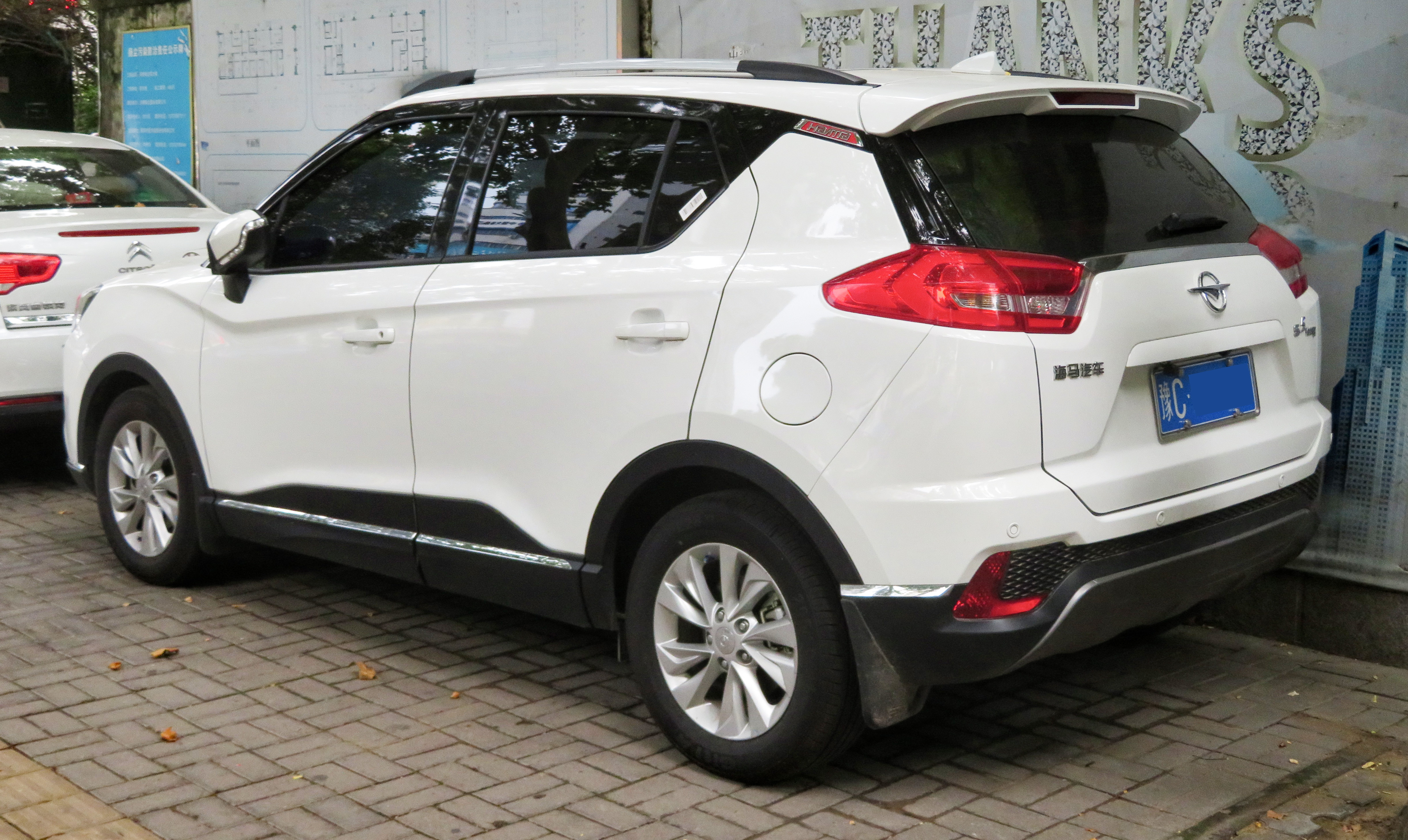
Rear view

The price range of the Haima S5 Young crossover ranges from 75,800 yuan to 79,800 yuan. The Haima S5 Young was formerly known as the Haima S3 during development phase. Power of the Haima S5 Young comes from a 122 hp (91 kW) 1.6-litre engine mated to a six-speed manual transmission or a 163 hp (122 kW) 1.5-litre turbo engine mated to a CVT.
