= Haima Fstar =

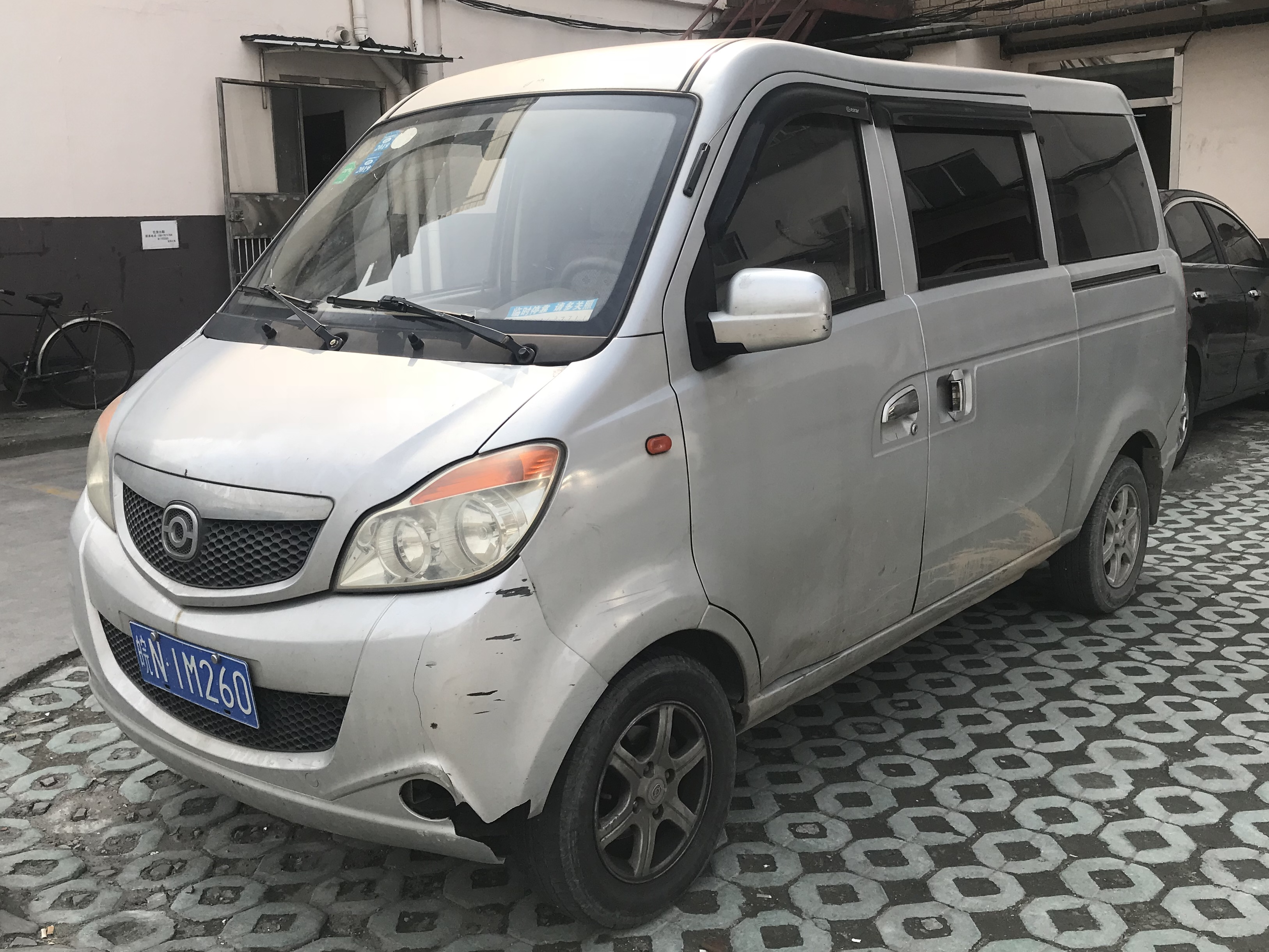

Overview
- Manufacturer: Haima Automobile
- Also called: Haima Fushida (Tengda / Hongda / Rongda)
- Production: 2010–2020
- Assembly: China: Hainan

Body and chassis
- Class: Microvan
- Body style: 5-door microvan

Powertrain
- Engine: 1.2 L I4
- Transmission: 5-speed manual

Dimensions
- Wheelbase: 2,715 mm (106.9 in)
- Length: 4,100 mm (161.4 in) (Tengda); 4,198 mm (165.3 in) (Rongda)
- Width: 1,566 mm (61.7 in) (Tengda); 1,666 mm (65.6 in) (Rongda)
- Height: 1,865 mm (73.4 in) (Tengda); 1,933 mm (76.1 in) (Rongda)

The Haima Fstar (Fushida; Chinese: 福仕达) is a series of 5- to 8-seater microvan produced by the Zhengzhou division of Haima Automobile.

== Overview ==
The Haima Fstar microvan was built on a chassis composed of two longitudinal beams and seven transverse beams, with the engine bay featuring a 1.2-liter DOHC 16-valve gasoline engine producing 91 hp (68 kW) and 112 Nm of torque in 2019.

== F-Star Hongda ==
The Haima F-star Hongda or Fushida Hongda (福仕达 鸿达) was launched in 2009 as Haima's first entry to the commercial microvan market. The Fushida Hongda was facelifted in 2012 as the Fushida II or Xinhongda (新鸿达, New Hongda), featuring a redesigned front grille and redesigned rear end.

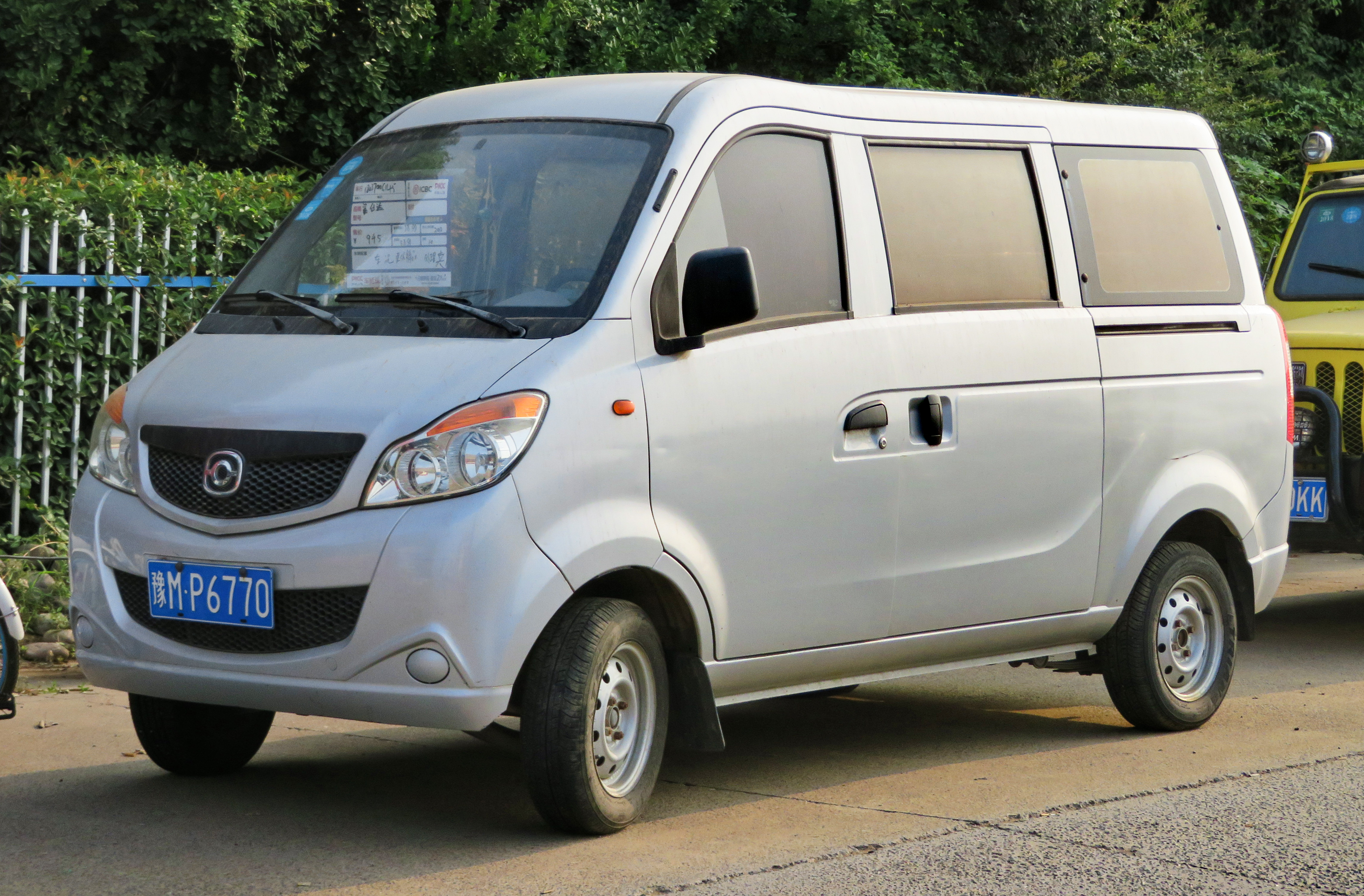
2010 Haima Fushida Hongda (front)

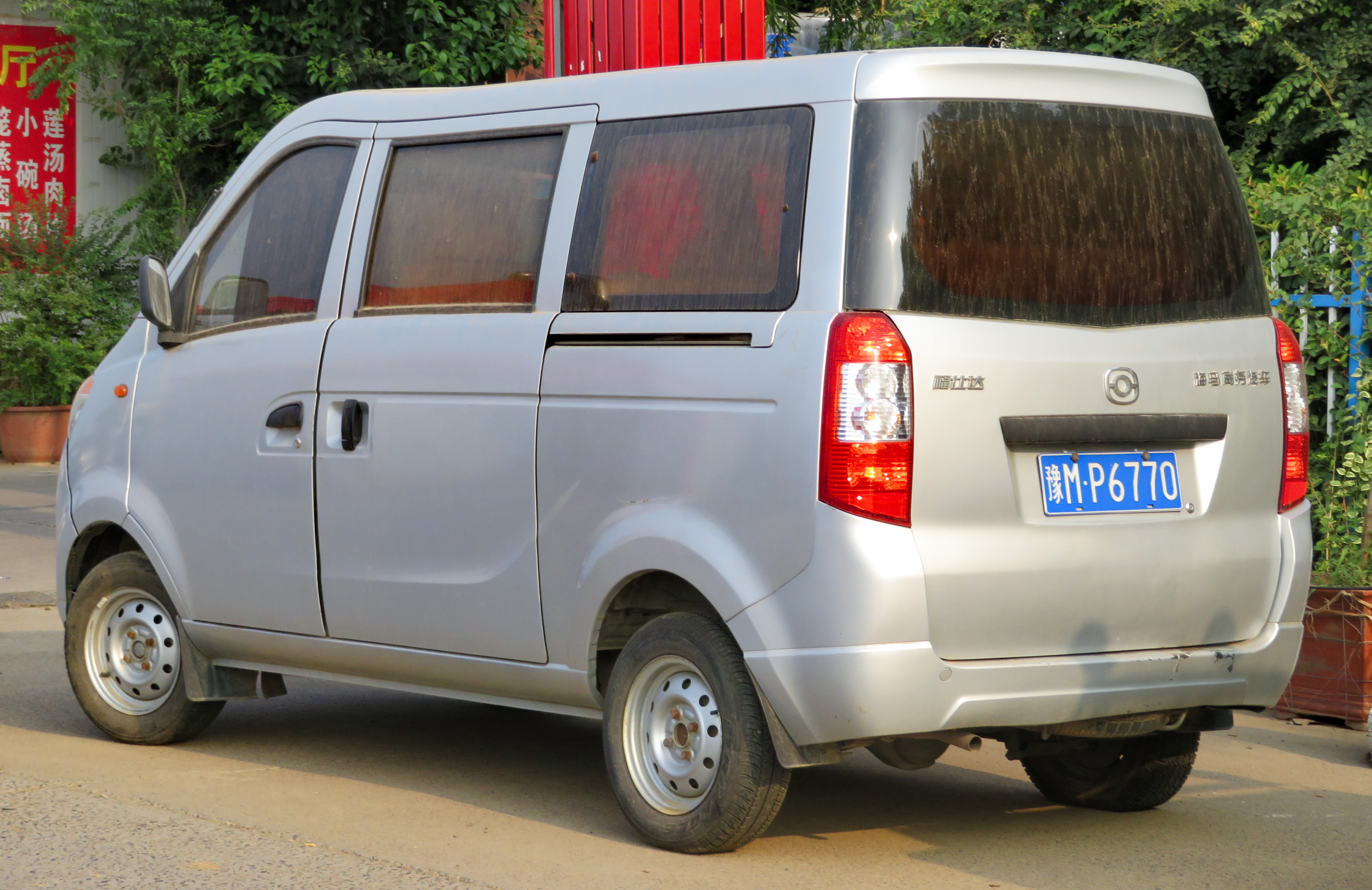
2010 Haima Fushida Hongda (rear)
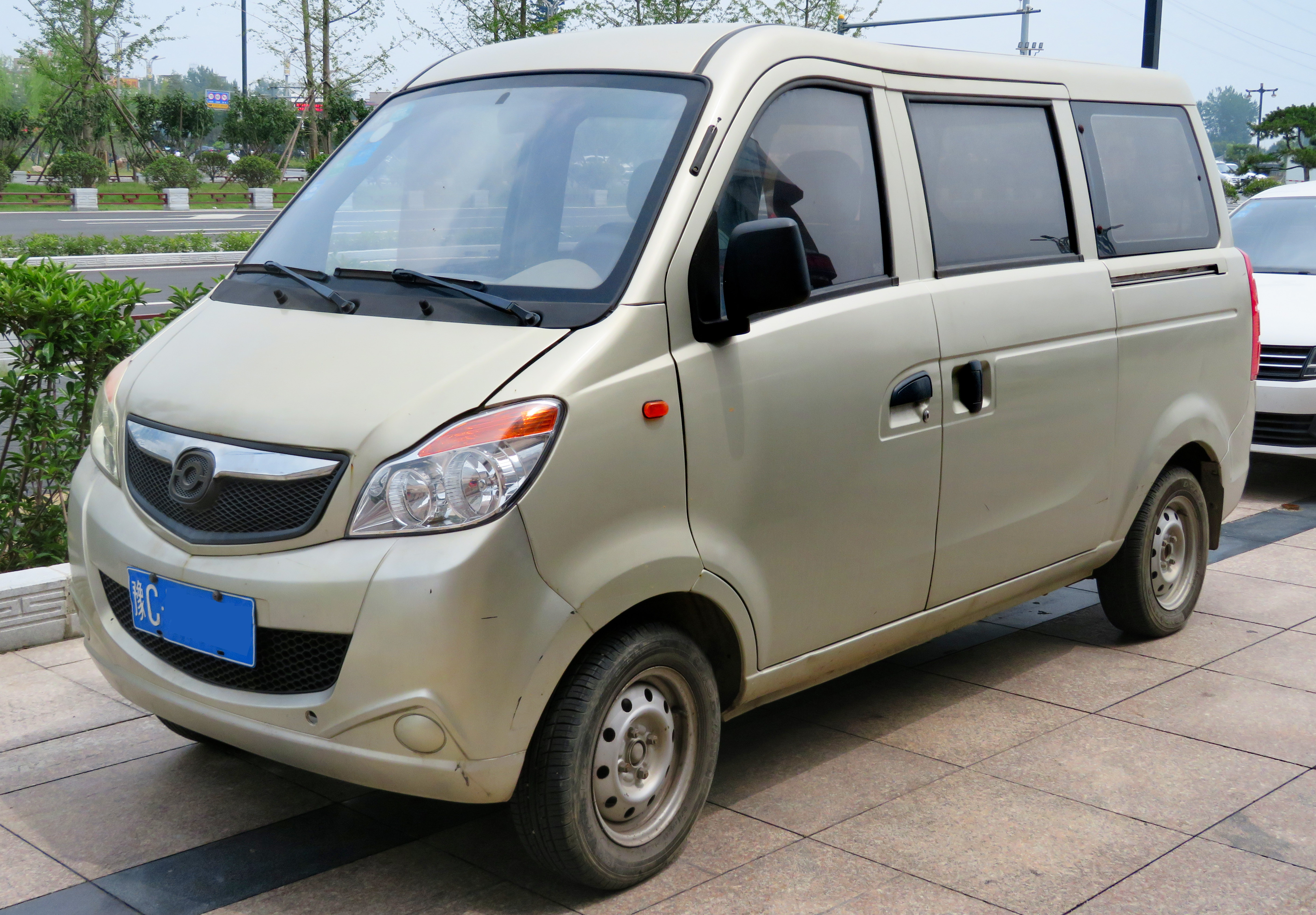
2014 Haima Fushida II (front)

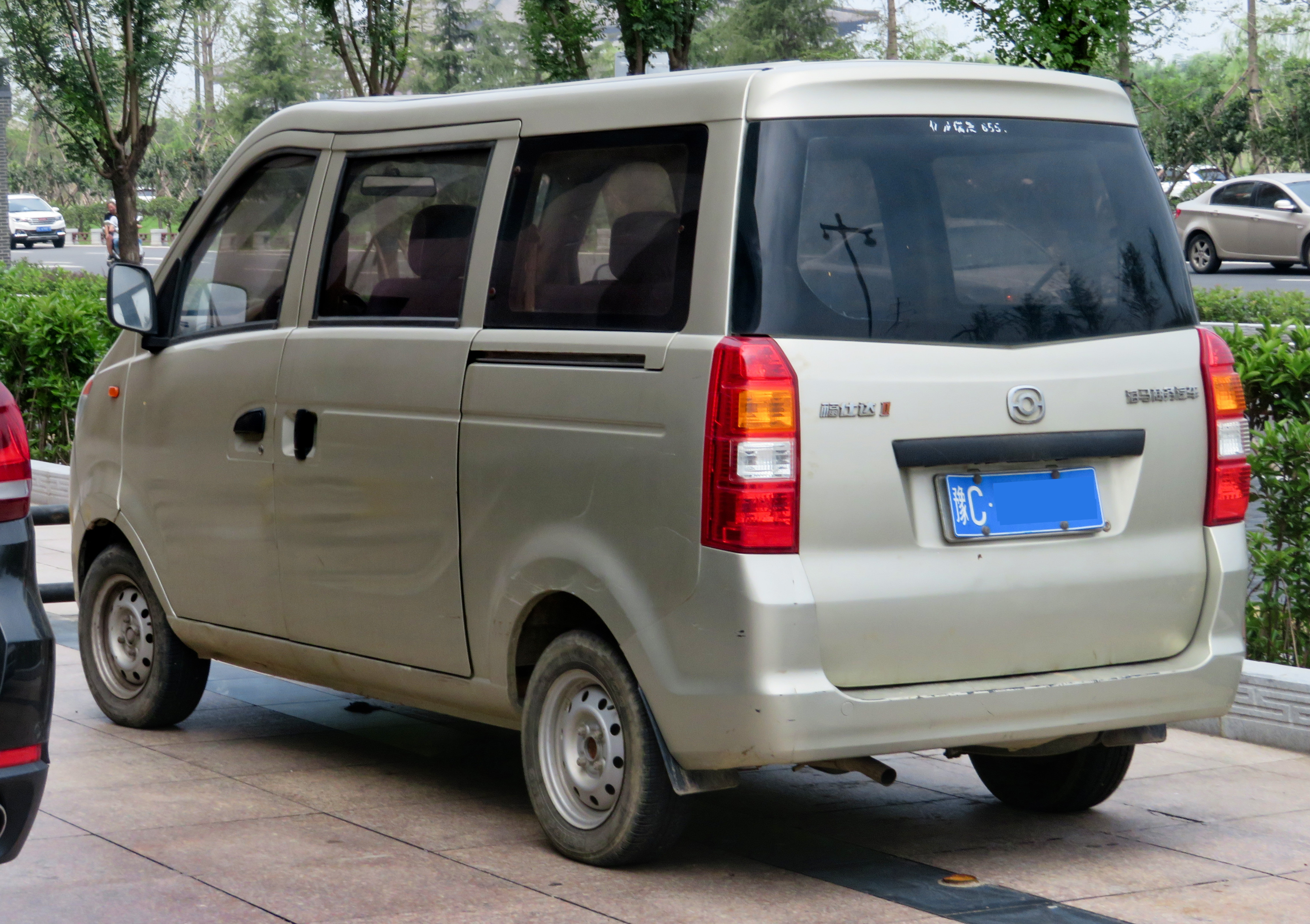
2014 Haima Fushida II (rear)

== F-Star Tengda ==
An undated model was launched and sold alongside in 2010 called the Fushida Tengda (福仕达 腾达), featuring a 4,100 mm (160 in) vehicle length with a 5100-liter cargo capacity. The 2010 Haima Fushida Tengda is powered by either a 61 hp (45 kW) 1.0-liter engine or a 83 hp (62 kW) 1.3-liter engine, with both engines mated to a 5-speed manual transmission. Design of the Tengda variant is shared with the previous Hongda variant.

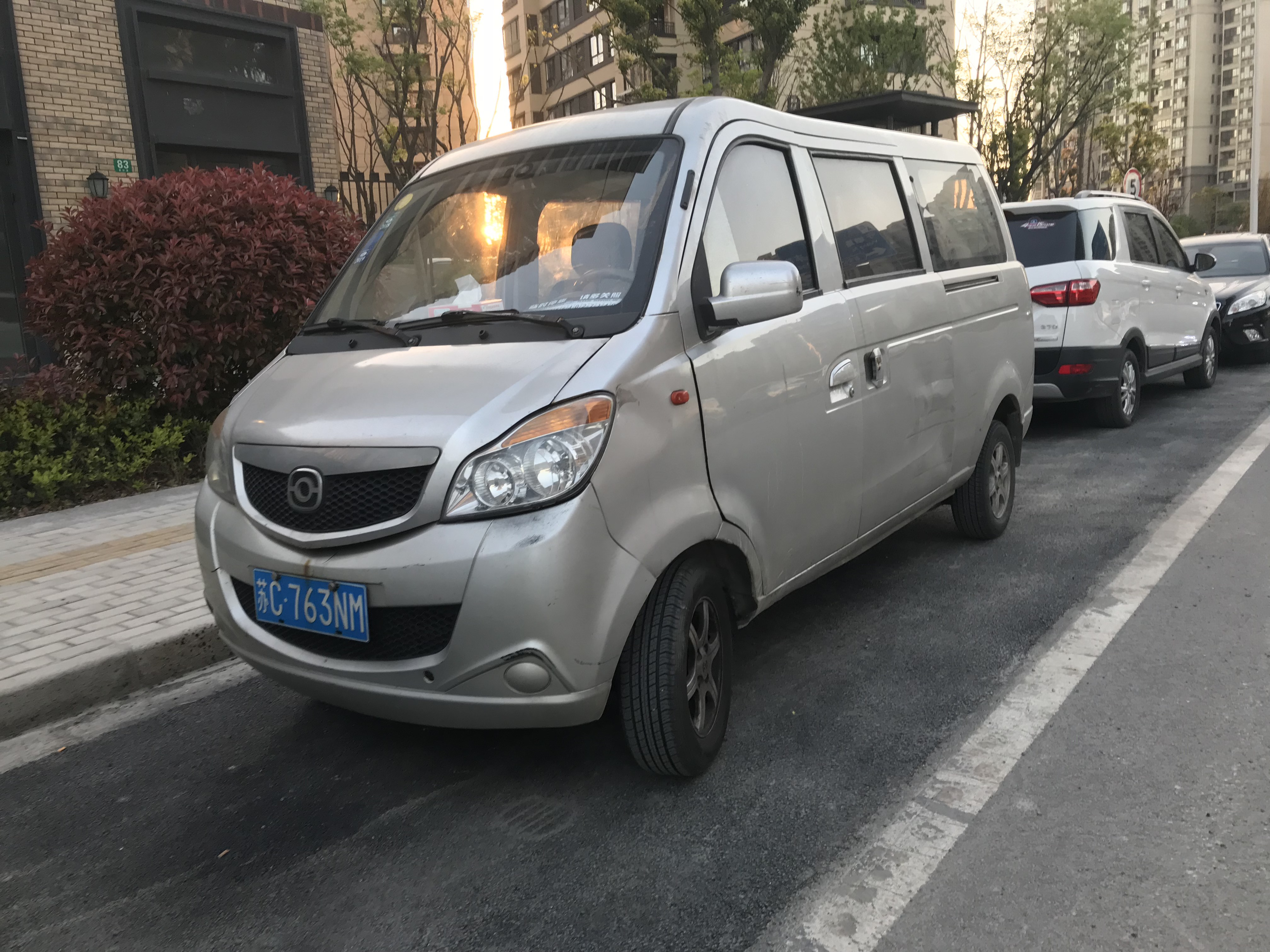
Haima Fushida Tengda (front)

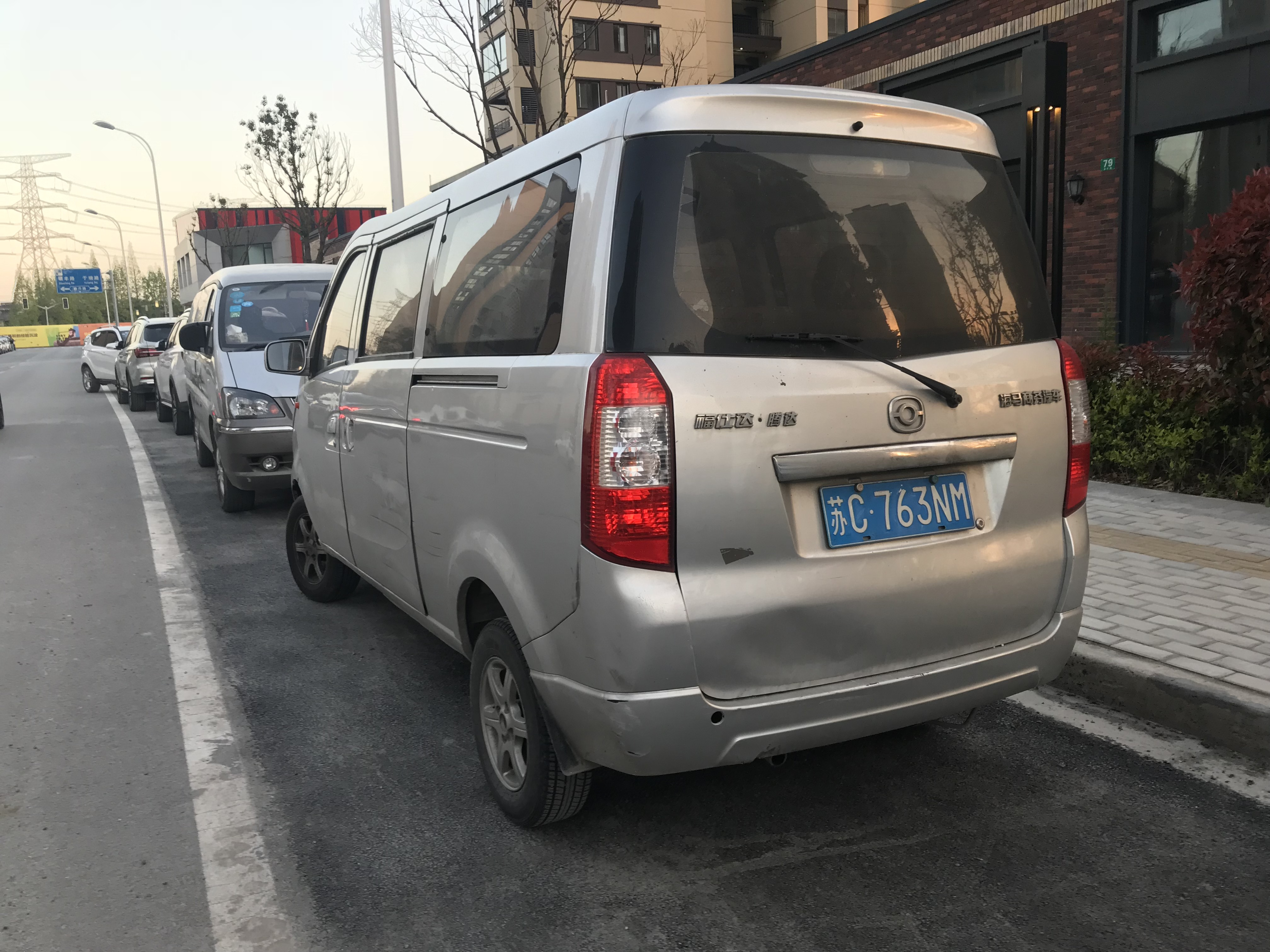
Haima Fushida Tengda (rear)

== F-Star Rongda ==
A third variant called the Fushida Rongda (福仕达 荣达) was launched in 2012 and sold alongside the other existing models. The Rongda variant features a completely redesigned front end and the rear end design of the Fushida II (Xin Hongda) while featuring a redesigned tailgate. Dimension wise the Rongda is 98 mm (3.9 in) longer and 100 mm (3.9 in) wider than the Tengda. The Rongda variant is powered by the Haima M-series M-12R 1.2-liter engine producing 92 hp (69 kW) and 117 Nm. According to officials, the fuel economy of the Rongda is 7 liters per 100 km (62 mi).

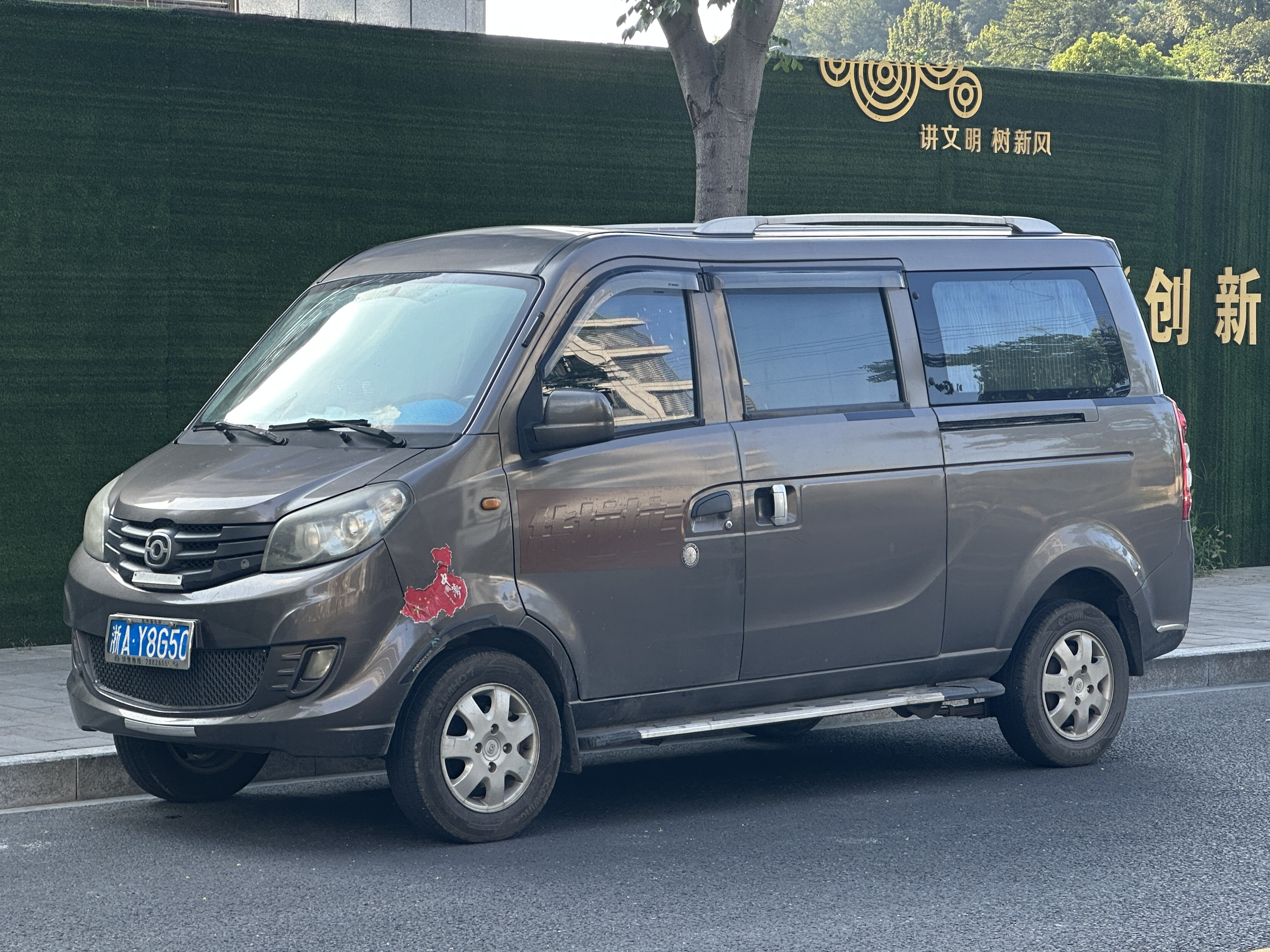
Haima Fushida Rongda (front)

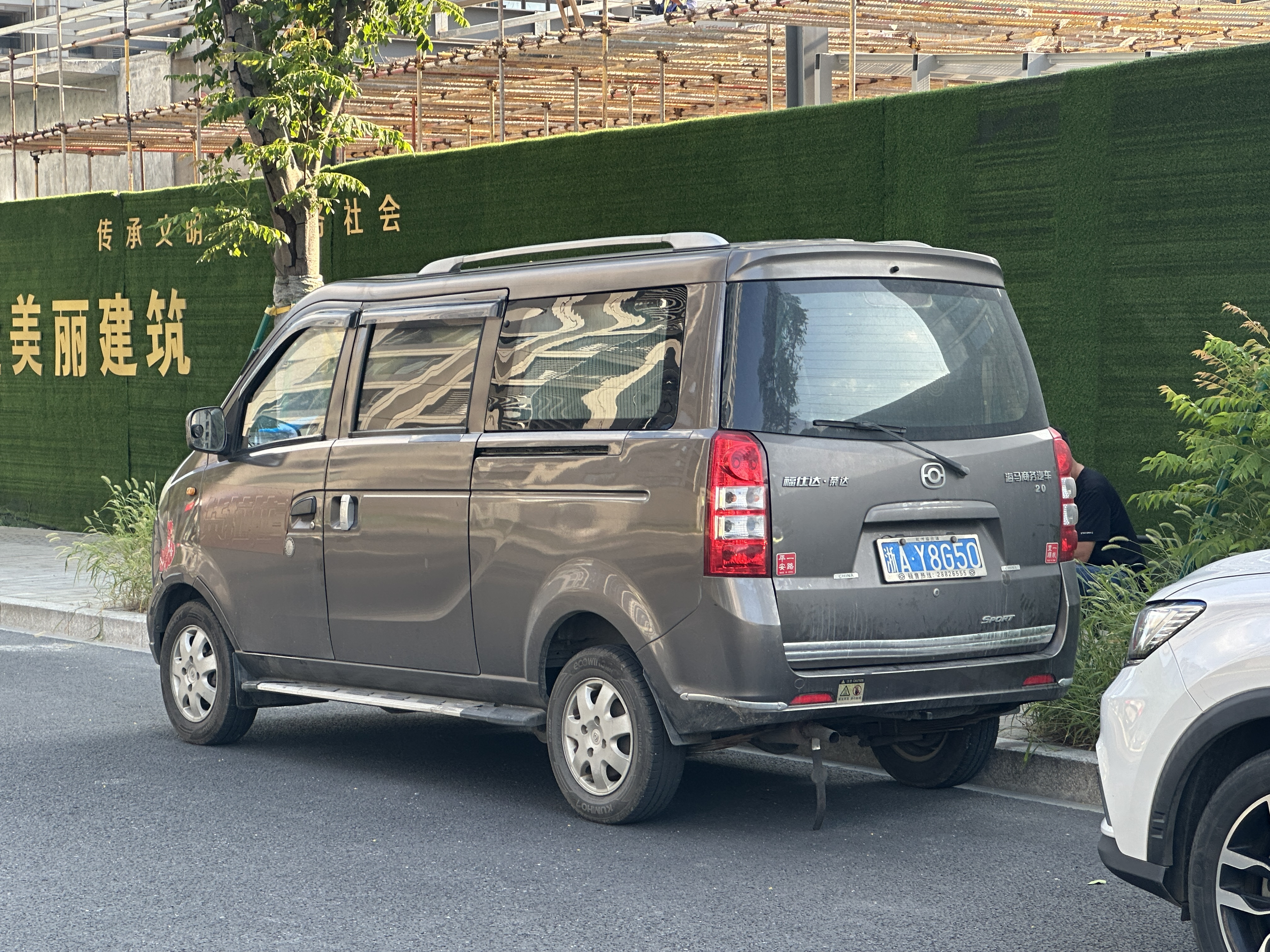
Haima Fushida Rongda (rear)
