= E1 =

E1, E01, E.I or E-1 may refer to:

== Transportation ==
=== Aircraft ===
- Azcárate E-1, a Mexican sesquiplane trainer
- Fokker E.I, a German fighter aircraft
- Grumman E-1 Tracer, an American airborne early warning aircraft
- Hydra Technologies E1 Gavilán, a hand-launched Mexican unmanned electronic surveillance drone
- Junkers E.I, the Idflieg designation for the 1916 Junkers J1 monoplane
- LVG E.I, a 1915 German two-seat monoplane
- NFW E.I, a 1917 German monoplane fighter
- Pfalz E.I, a Morane-Saulnier H monoplane built under licence for Germany
- Siemens-Schuckert E.I, a 1915 German single seat monoplane
- Standard E-1, a 1917 early American Army fighter aircraft

=== Automobiles ===
- BMW E1, a 1991 and 1993 German electric/hybrid city car concept
- BYD e1, a 2019–present Chinese electric city car
- Dongfeng Fengguang E1, a 2019–present Chinese electric mini crossover
- Haima E1, a 2020–present Chinese electric city car
- Roewe E1, a 2012 Chinese electric city car concept later produced as the Roewe E50
- E1, a Mazda E type piston engine
- Switch E1, a bus Built by Switch Mobility
- Bestune E01, a compact electric crossover

=== Submarines ===
- HMS E1, an E-class submarine of the Royal Navy
- USS E-1 (SS-24), a 1917 E-class submarine of the United States Navy

=== Roads ===
- European route E1, from Northern Ireland to Spain
- E1 European long distance path, a long-distance hiking route from Norway to Italy
- London Buses route E1, a transport for London contracted bus route
- Tomei Expressway and Meishin Expressway, route E1 in Japan
- North–South Expressway Northern Route and New Klang Valley Expressway, route E1 in Malaysia
- E1 expressway (Philippines) (North Luzon Expressway, Subic–Clark–Tarlac Expressway, and Tarlac–Pangasinan–La Union Expressway), expressway route in the Philippines
- E1 expressway (Pakistan)
- E01, Southern Expressway in Sri Lanka

=== Trains and locomotives ===
- E1 Series Shinkansen, a Japanese high-speed train
- Bavarian E I, a German steam engines locomotive model
- Ceylon Government Railway E1, a steam locomotive
- EMC E1, a diesel locomotive
- LB&SCR E1 class, an 1874 British 0-6-0 steam locomotive
- NCC Class E1, a Northern Counties Committee Irish steam locomotive
- NER Class E1, an 1898 class of small 0-6-0T steam locomotive
- PRR E1, an American PRR 4-4-2 steam locomotive
- SP&S Class E-1, a 1934 steam locomotives class

== Science and mathematics ==
=== Biochemistry ===
- E1 (HCV), a viral structural protein found in hepatitis C
- E1, a unimolecular elimination mechanism in organic chemistry
- E1-enzymes, also known as Ubiquitin-activating enzymes, an enzyme which catalyzes the first step in the ubiquitination reaction, which targets a protein for degradation via a proteasome]
- E1 regulatory sequence for the insulin gene
- Estrone, a hormone
- Pyruvate dehydrogenase (E1), the first component enzyme of pyruvate dehydrogenase complex
- Acireductone synthase, an enzyme
- Haplogroup E1 (Y-DNA), a human Y-chromosome DNA haplogroup

=== Mathematics ===
- Exponential integral, $E_1(z)= \int_1^\infty \frac{e^{-tz}}{t}\, {\rm d}t~$, mathematical function
- the E1 series (number series) of preferred numbers

=== Medicine ===
- E1-isoprostane, a type of isoprostane

== Businesses and organizations ==
- E1 Music, an independent record label in the United States
- E1 Corp., a Korean chemical and oil company, member of the LS Group
- Entertainment One, an international media company

== Electronics ==
- Honda E1, a predecessor of the ASIMO humanoid robot
- Olympus E-1, a digital single-lens reflex camera

== Places ==
- E1 (West Bank), an area east of Jerusalem in the West Bank
- E1 postcode district, London, England, United Kingdom

== Other uses ==
- E01, ECO code for the closed variation of the Catalan Opening in chess
- E01, the Encase Image File Format
- E-1 (rank), the pay grade for enlisted ranks of Private, Airman Basic, and Seaman Recruit in the United States Military
- E1 grade, a difficulty level in rock climbing
- E-1 (rocket engine), a liquid propellant rocket engine
- E1 carrier, an E-carrier European telecommunications standard
- E1, an AMD CPU from the Bobcat (microarchitecture) family
- E1, abbreviation for the Oracle JD Edwards EnterpriseOne software
- E1 on Gardiner's sign list, representing the bull
- E1 Series (boat racing), an international powerboat racing series

== See also ==
- List of highways numbered 1
- 1E (disambiguation)
