= EQ1 =

EQ1 or variation, may refer to:

- EverQuest 1, an MMO-RPG released in 1999
- The Equalizer 1, a 2014 action film
- Sky-Watcher EQ1, a telescope equatorial mount
- Chery eQ1, an electric car

== See also ==
- EQL (disambiguation)
- EQ (disambiguation)
- Q1 (disambiguation)
- E1 (disambiguation)
- 1 (disambiguation)
