= 1E =

1E or 1-E may refer to:

- 1st meridian east, a longitude coordinate
- ISS 1E
- Astra 1E, a communications satellite owned and operated by SES, and launched in 1995
- California Proposition 1E (2009), a defeated California ballot proposition
- 1E, UIC classification of the 2-10-0 train arrangement
- 1E, a designator of celestial objects discovered via Einstein Observatory

== See also ==
- List of highways numbered 1
- E1 (disambiguation)
