= E1 series =

E1 series may refer to:

- E1 Series (boat racing), a series of electric powered offshore powerboat races
- E1 series (preferred numbers), a series of standardized resistor and capacitor values
- E1 series (train), a Japanese Shinkansen train since 1994

== See also ==
- E1 (disambiguation)
