= EQL =

EQL may refer to:

- Air São Tomé and Príncipe, a defunct airline
- Earthquake light, a reportedly luminous aerial phenomenon
- Energy Queensland Limited, owner of Ergon Energy, Australia
- Ecosystem Qualified Lead

== See also ==
- European Quality of Life Survey (EQLS); See European Foundation for the Improvement of Living and Working Conditions
- EQ1 (disambiguation)
- Equal (disambiguation)
