= Q1 =

Q1 or Q-1 may refer to:

== Transport ==
=== Air ===
- Radioplane Q-1, an American experimental unmanned aircraft of the 1950s
- The primary United States Air Force designation for a series of unmanned aerial vehicles built by General Atomics, which includes the MQ-1 Predator and the MQ-1C Warrior

=== Road ===
- Q1 (New York City bus)
- Rossion Q1, a sports car from US car maker 1g Racing/Rossion Automotive

=== Rail ===
- LNER Thompson Class Q1, a class of steam locomotives of the London and North Eastern Railway, UK
- PRR Q1, a steam locomotive of the Pennsylvania Railroad, USA
- SECR Q1 class, a steam locomotive of the South Eastern and Chatham Railway, UK
- SR Q1 class, a steam locomotive of the Southern Railway, UK

== Science and technology ==
- First quartile in descriptive statistics
- DIGITAL Q1, a digital camera model (Fujifilm)
- Samsung Q1, an Ultra Mobile Personal Computer (UMPC)
- Q1 microcomputer, an early offering in the history of personal computers
- The Universe, which has Wikidata identifier Q1

== Media and publications ==
- Quake (video game) 1, a 1996 video game
- Quran 1, al fātiḥah the 1st chapter of the Islamic Holy book
- The first quarto, usually meaning the earliest published version, of one of William Shakespeare's works

== Other uses ==
- Quarter 1, as in the first quarter of a calendar year or fiscal year
- Q1 (building), a residential apartment building in Surfers Paradise, Australia
- Q-1 visa, allows individuals traveling to the U.S. to participate in a cultural exchange program
- Qualifying 1, or first qualifying in Formula 1

== See also ==
- 1Q (disambiguation)
- QI, a British comedy television quiz
