= BYD Flyer =

Qinchuan/BYD Flyer
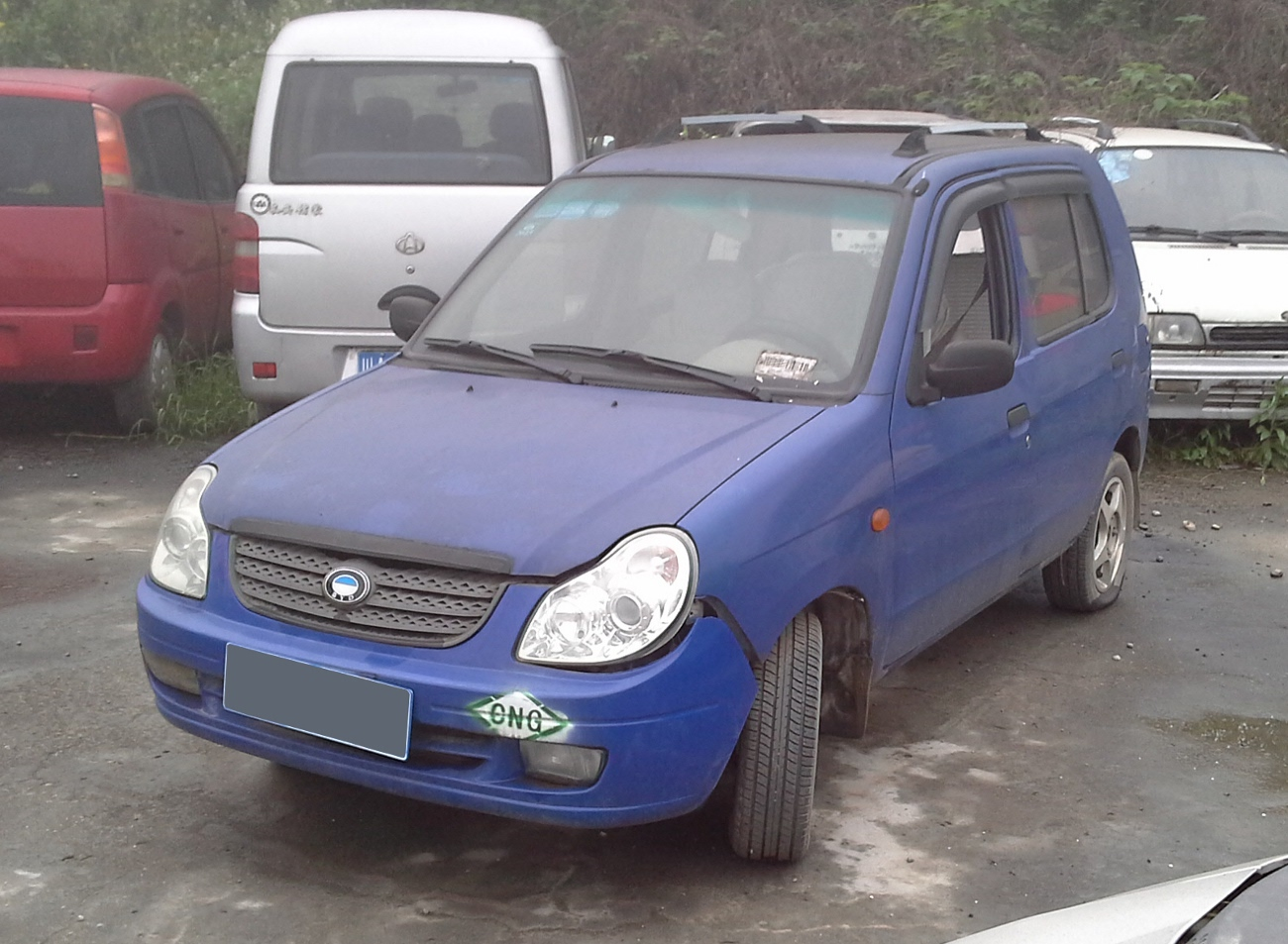
- BYD Flyer

Overview
- Manufacturer: BYD
- Also called: Qinchuan Flyer
- Production: 2001–2005 (Qinchuan Flyer); 2005–2008 (BYD Flyer)
- Assembly: China

Body and chassis
- Class: City car
- Body style: 5-door hatchback
- Layout: Front engine, front-wheel drive
- Related: Suzuki Fronte

Powertrain
- Engine: 0.8 L HH368QA1 I3; 0.8 L F8CV I3; 0.9 L LJ462Q-1 I4; 1.05 L LJ465Q-1ANE1 I4; 1.05 L HH465Q-2E I4
- Transmission: 5-speed manual 4-speed manual 4-speed automatic

Dimensions
- Wheelbase: 2,300 mm (90.6 in)
- Length: 3,605 mm (141.9 in)
- Width: 1,468 mm (57.8 in)
- Height: 1,470 mm (57.9 in)
- Curb weight: 720 kg (1,587 lb)

Chronology
- Predecessor: Qinchuan Xian Alto QCJ7080
- Successor: BYD F0

The BYD Flyer is a city car originally developed by government owned Xian Qinchuan Automobile and went on sale from 2001 to 2005. It has been produced by BYD, a Chinese automobile manufacturer in Shenzhen, from 2005 to 2008. The three- and four-cylinder engines used are based on old Suzuki units.

== History ==
The Flyer was originally built by Qinchuan Machinery Works (part of Norinco/the People's Liberation Army in Xi’an, Shaanxi Province) as their first 'original' car since the Beifang QJC7050 mini car. As Qinchuan had been making a version of the Suzuki Alto as the Xianalto QCJ7080 since 1992, they used the platform of the Alto (also used for the Maruti 800 and various other Chinese makes) for the QCJ7081 Flyer, which was sold under the Qinchuan marque from 2001.

After BYD bought Qinchuan Auto, the car was facelifted in October 2003 and become BYD's first car, though at this point it was sold as the Flyer Fuxing. After acquiring the QCJ7081 platform, BYD wanted to introduce a number of new models based on the car, including an electric taxi (the Flyer EF3), the Flyer Dragon Car and some long wheelbase versions (the luxurious Flyer F2 and the Flyer F4 estate). The cars were shown at various motor shows (including the Beijing and the Guangzhou auto shows), but none made it to production, with BYD continuing to produce the original model under their own brand.

In 2005, sales of the Flyer I commenced under the BYD marque. In March 2005 a facelifted version known as the Flyer II was sold, including exports to Russia and Ukraine. The facelifted model is identified by a revised design to the headlights and grille.

The Flyer has been replaced by the more modern looking BYD F0 in 2008, although new Flyers were sold up to 2010.

== Engines ==
The Flyer is powered by a range of small 3- and 4-cylinder Suzuki derived engines, ranging from 0.8-litre (796 cc) to 1.1-litre (1051 cc).

- HH368QA1 - 796 cc - 29.5 kW (40 PS) - (QCJ7081BD)
- F8CV - 796 cc - 37.5 kW (51 PS) - (QCJ7081DD)
- LJ462Q-1 - 870 cc - 30 kW (41 PS) - (QCJ7081BD1)
- LJ465Q-1ANE1 - 1,051 cc - 38.5 kW (52 PS) - (QCJ7110)
- HH465Q-2E - 1,051 cc - 38.5 kW (52 PS) - (QCJ7110)

== Gallery ==
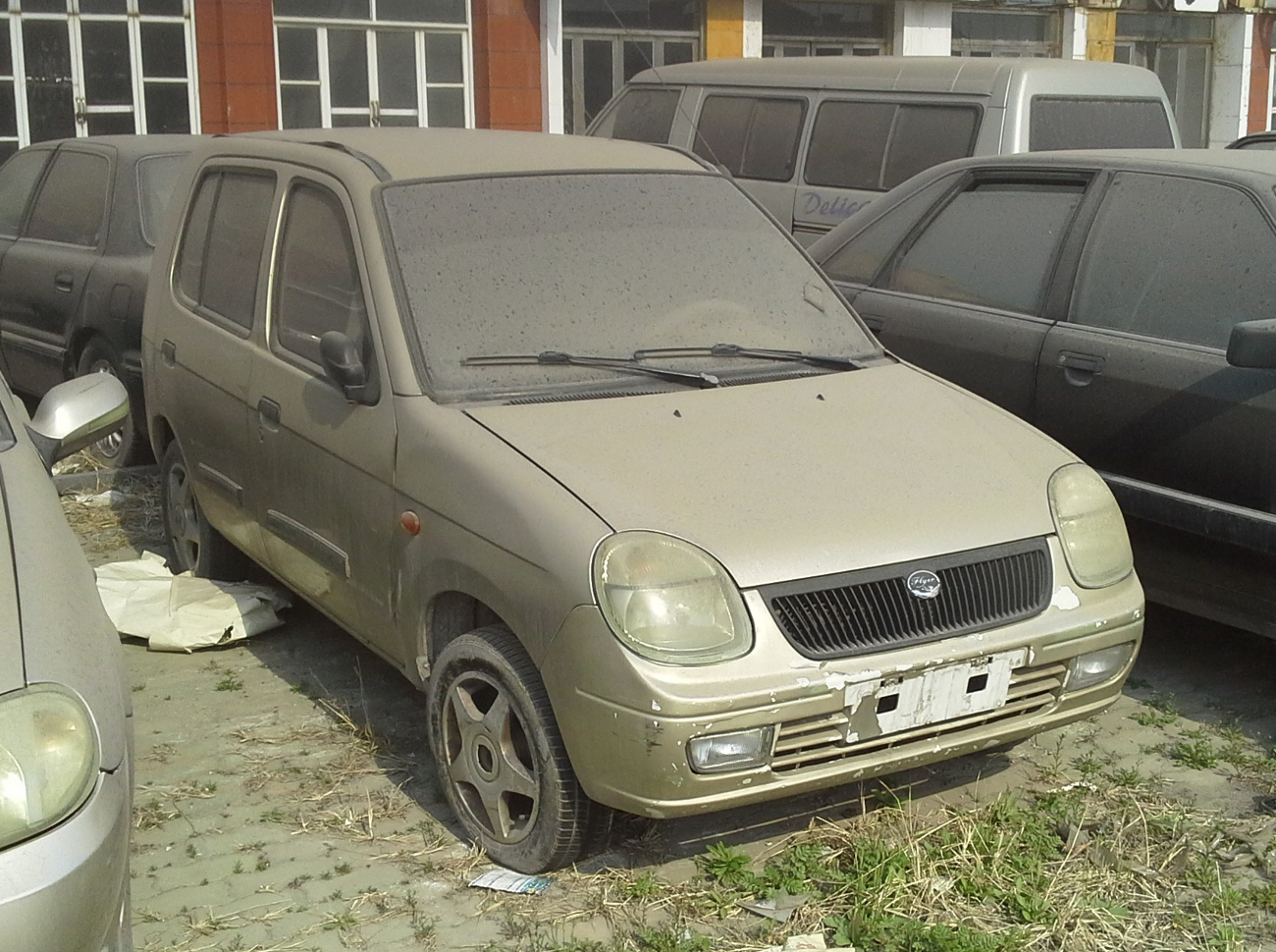
Qinchuan Flyer

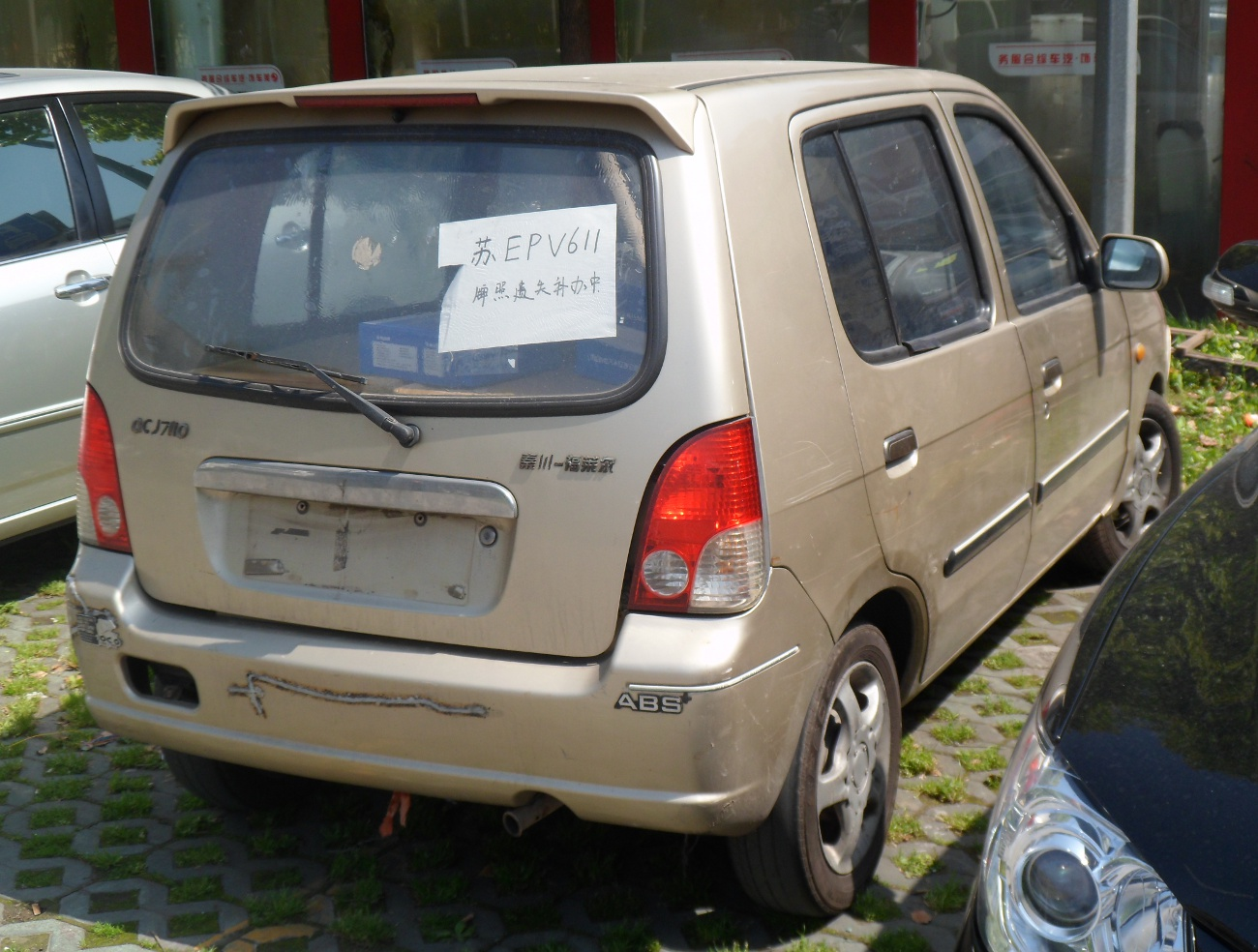
Rear view
