= Haima Aishang =

Haima 1
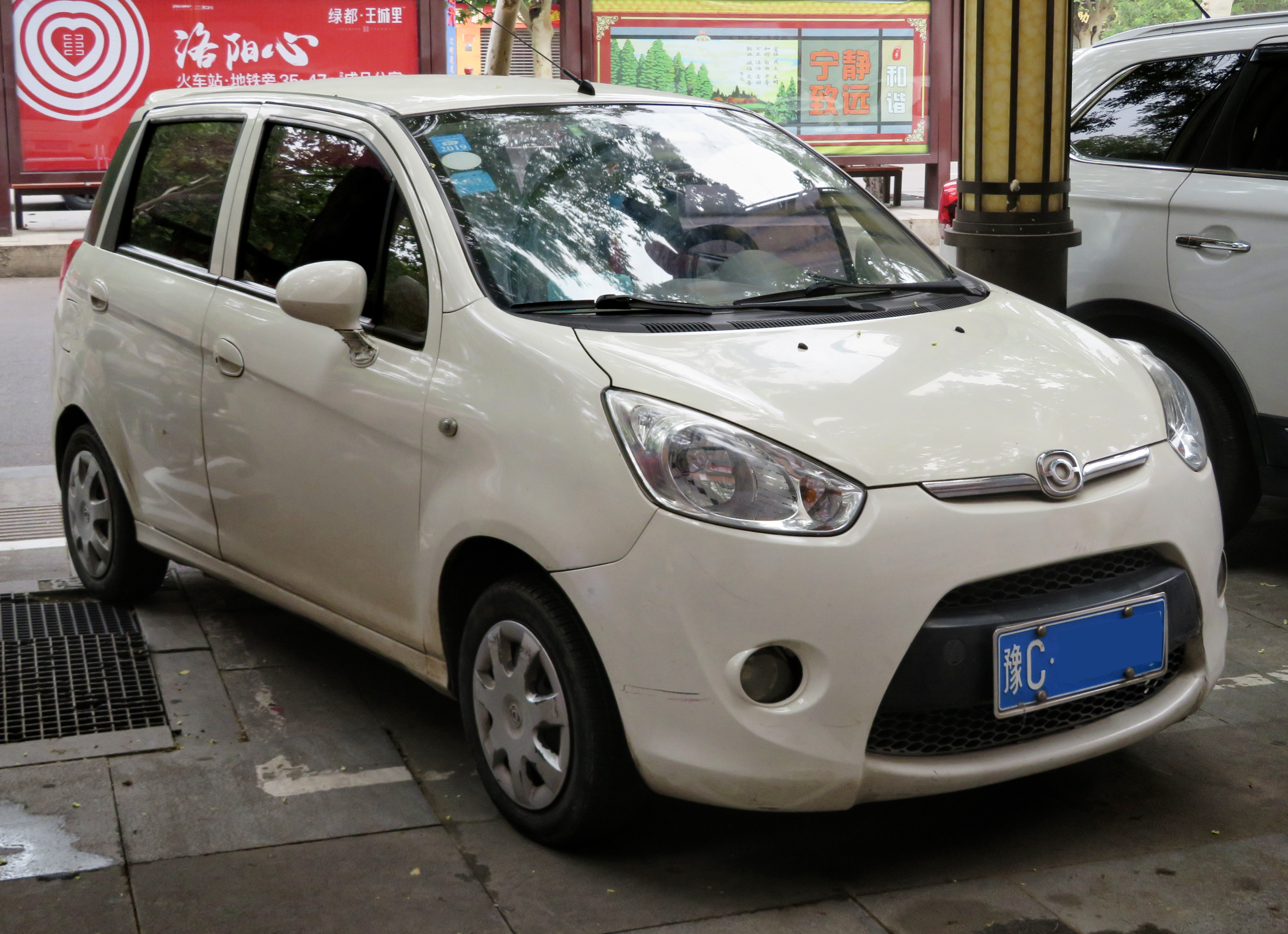

Overview
- Manufacturer: Haima Automobile
- Also called: Haima Aishang EV; Haima E1; Haima M11; Haima Prince (王子)
- Production: 2012–2020
- Assembly: China: Hainan

Body and chassis
- Class: City car
- Body style: 5-door hatchback

Powertrain
- Engine: 1.0 L HMA GM10-VF1 I4 (petrol); 1.2 L I4 (petrol)
- Transmission: 5-speed manual 5-speed automatic

Dimensions
- Wheelbase: 2,332 mm (91.8 in)
- Length: 3,662 mm (144.2 in)
- Width: 1,540 mm (60.6 in)
- Height: 1,518 mm (59.8 in)

The Haima 1 or Haima Aishang (Chinese: 海马爱尚) is a city car produced by Haima positioned below the Haima 2 subcompact.

== Overview ==
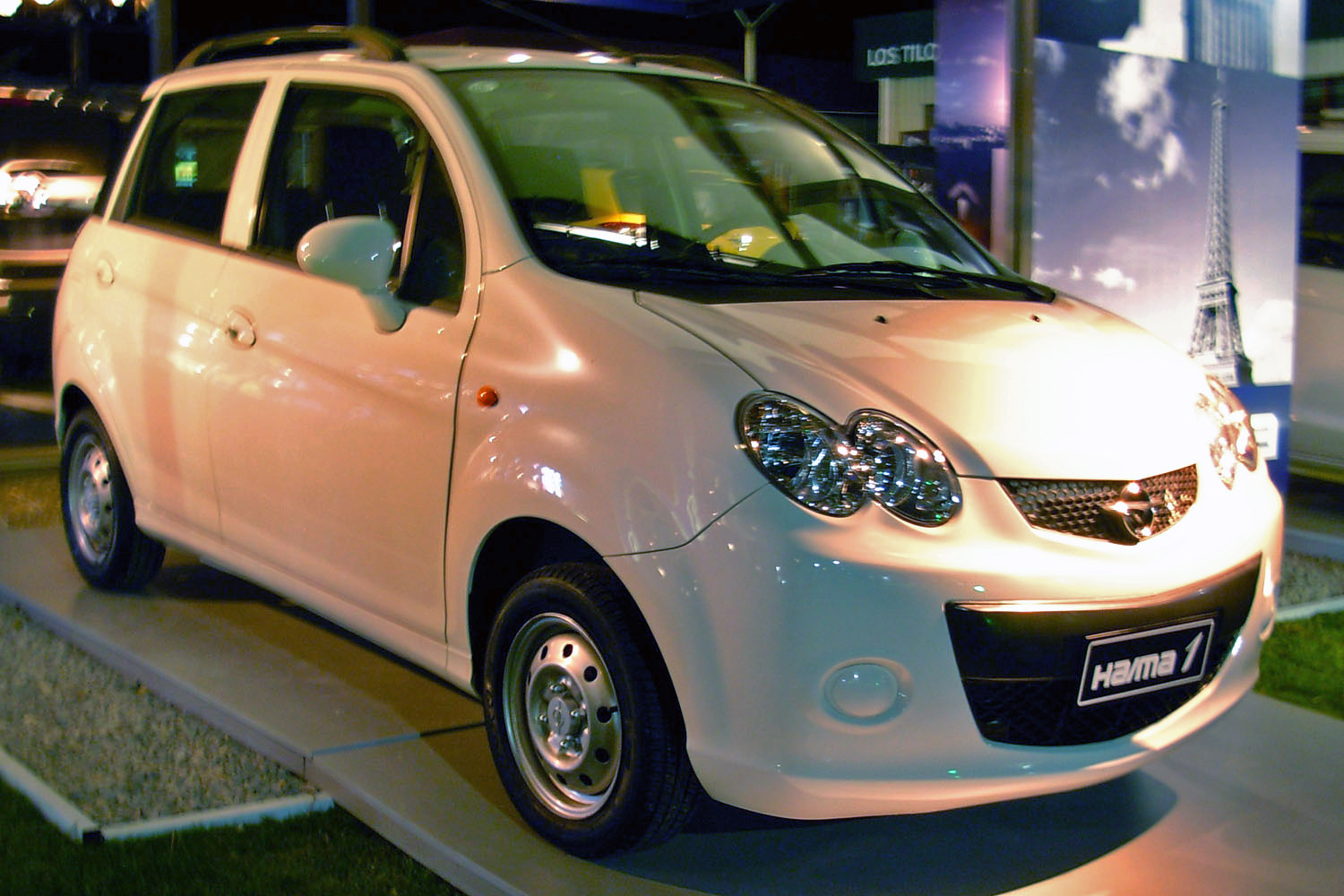
Haima 1 concept car

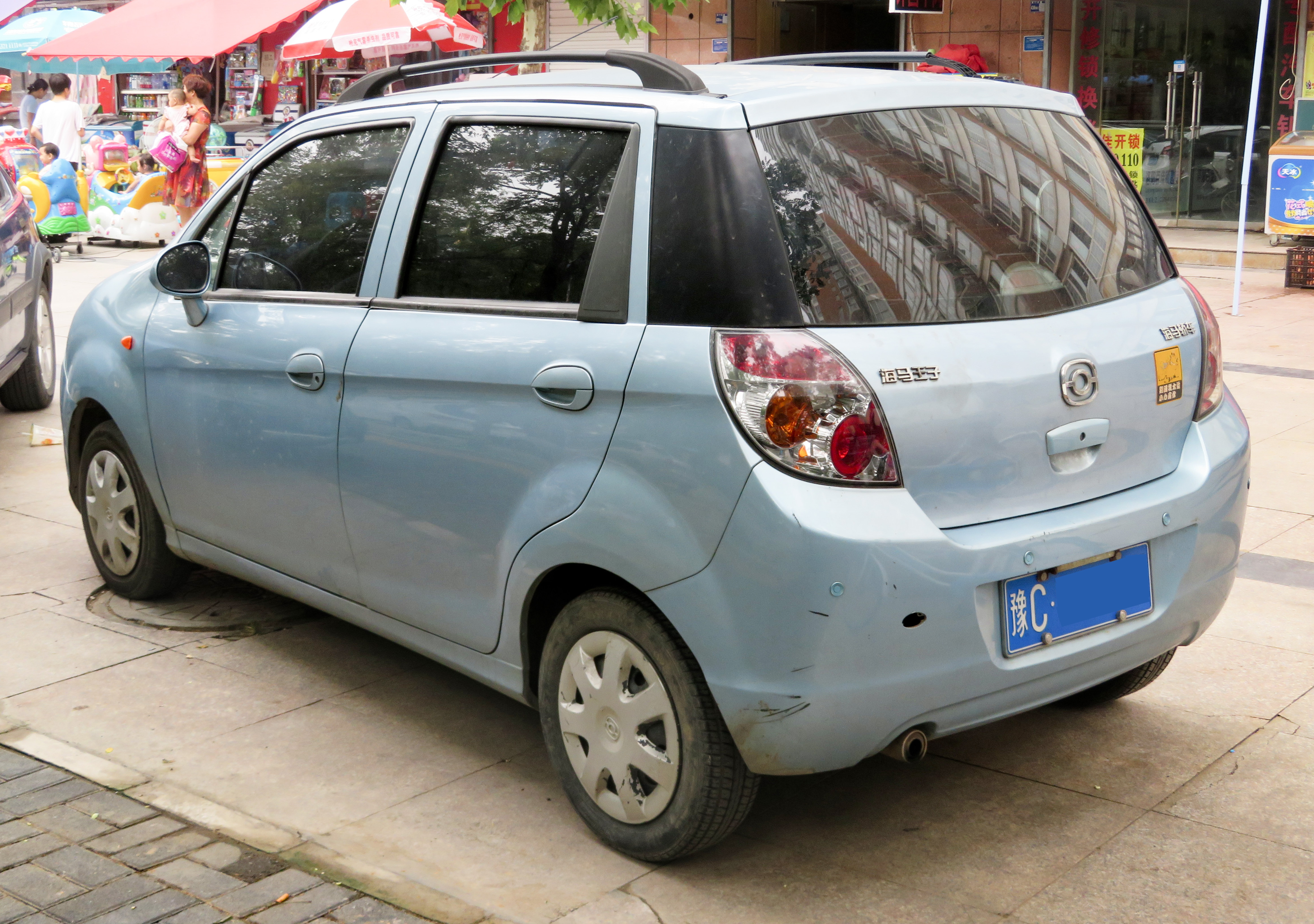
Rear view

Originally marketed as the Haima M11 when revealed as a concept car in 2010. Initial styling of the Haima M11 heavily resembles the first generation Chevrolet Spark with the front end of the BYD F0 city car. The production version was revealed in 2012 during the 2012 Beijing Auto Show as the Haima 1, changing mainly the front fascia of the Haima 1 taking inspirations from the sixth generation Mitsubishi Mirage subcompact hatchback. A rename was later done changing the name from Haima 1 to Haima Aishang (爱尚) it has been available solely as a five-door hatchback with prices ranging from 35,800 yuan to 45,800 yuan. With the 1.2 AMT version being added in 2014 with prices ranging from 42,800 yuan to 44,800 yuan.

== Haima Aishang EV160 (From May 2015 to May 2017) ==
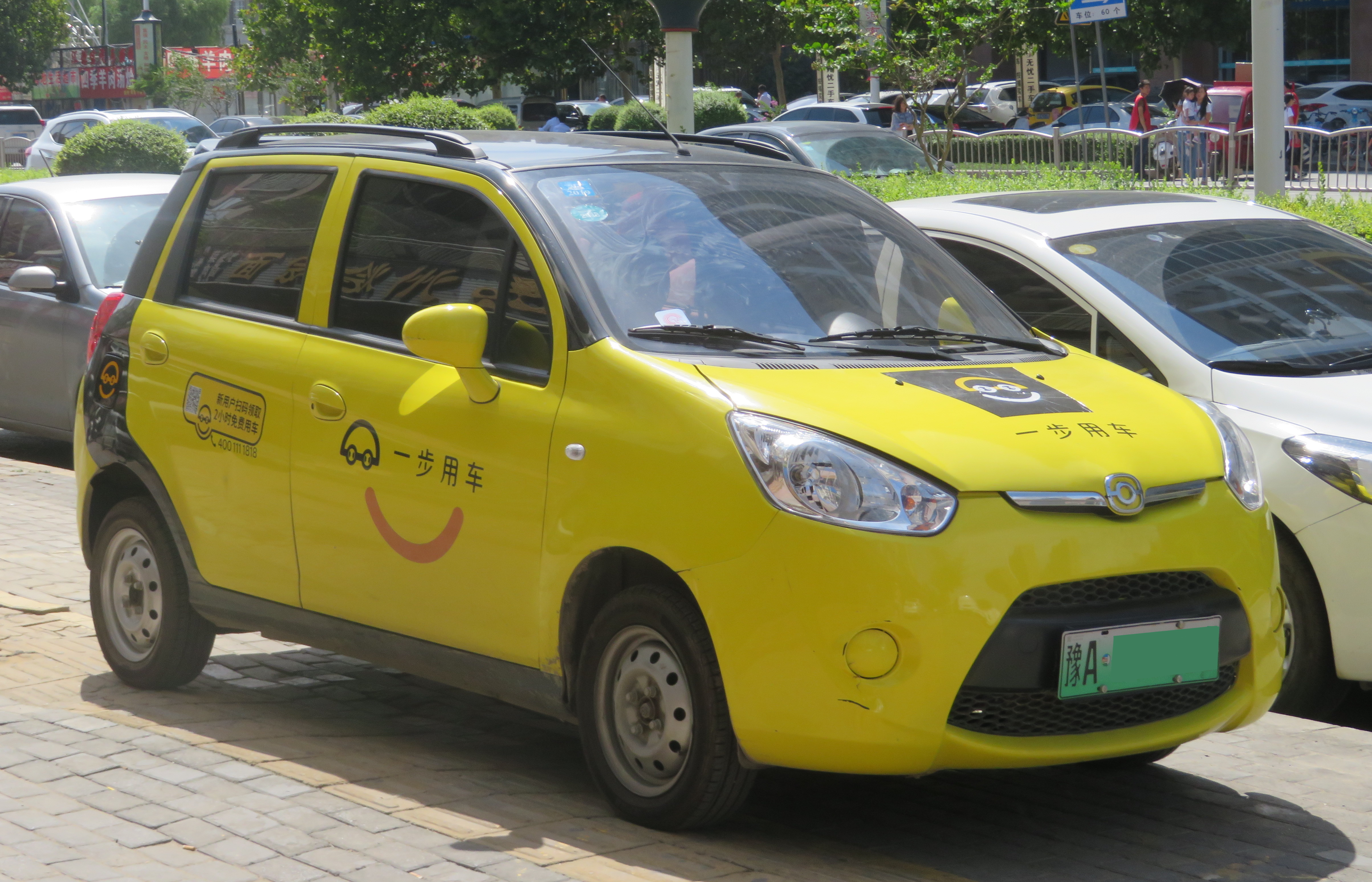
Haima Aishang EV

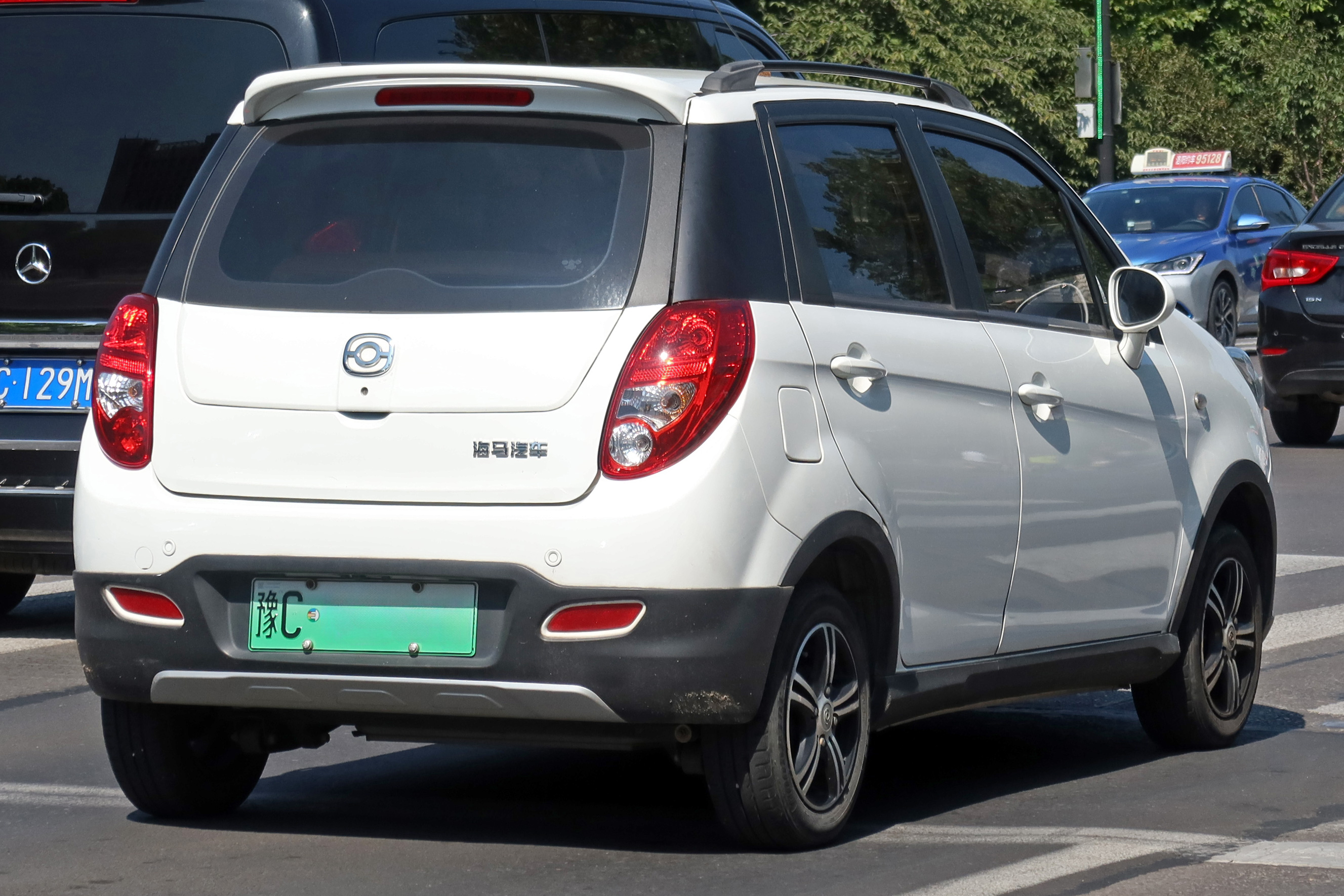
Rear view

The Haima Aishang EV160 is the battery electric vehicle version of the Haima Aishang city car. The Haima Aishang EV debuted during the 2015 Shanghai Auto Show in April 2015. The Haima Aishang EV was powered by a 28 hp electric motor, equipped with an 18.2 kWh battery, with a range of 160 km at a constant speed of 60 km/h (according to a Chinese standard), and a top speed of 102 km/h.

== Haima Aishang EV200 (From May 2017 to May 2019) ==
The Haima Aishang EV200 is some sort of hardware update to its predecessor EV160, shipping with revisions and improvements. The motor power of the electric drive had been increased to 40 kW which corresponds to 54 hp. The battery got a charging capacity of 21 kWh. The range is 202 kilometers at a constant speed of 60 km/h (according to a Chinese standard). The top speed remained the same. The model was unveiled in mid-2016, and was introduced into the Chinese market in May 2017. The price had been at 103,800 yuan.

As of 2018, the Haima Aishang EV is the only available option still on the market after the discontinuation of the petrol powered Haima Aishang city car.

== Haima Aishang EV (Since May 2019) ==
Approximately since May 2019 as the Haima Aishang EV is being offered in three variants, all differing in the charging capacity of the Li-ion battery. The entry variant is offered with a battery charging capacity of 26.1 kWh at an entry price of possibly 99,800 yuan. The other two variants are offered, one with a battery charging capacity of 34.05 kWh combined with an ordinary steering wheel and the other with a battery charging capacity of 32.54 kWh combined with a multifunction steering wheel, the last two of which being listed at the same high price (which could translate into an arithmetically calculated price of 116,490 yuan if the last two variants are offered in China at all – those two variants might be or might not be subjected to serve as export variants only, to be sent outside of China).
