= 1Q =

1Q may refer to:

- First quarter of a calendar year
- Sirena the airline, see IATA code
- 1q, an arm of Chromosome 1 (human)
- SSH 1Q (WA); see Washington State Route 505
- AH-1Q, a model of Bell AH-1 Cobra
- P4M-1Q, a model of Martin P4M Mercator
- A3D-1Q, a model of Douglas A-3 Skywarrior
- AD-1Q, a model of Douglas A-1 Skyraider

== See also ==
- Q1 (disambiguation)
