= 2009 California Proposition 1E =

Proposition 1E
- May 19, 2009
- Mental Health Service Funding. Temporary Reallocation. Helps Balance State Budget.

Results
Choice	Votes	%
Yes	1,597,907	33.52%
No	3,169,163	66.48%
Total votes	4,767,070	100.00%
County results
Against
70–80%
60–70%
50–60%

Proposition 1E was a defeated California ballot proposition that appeared on the May 19, 2009 special election ballot. The measure was legislatively referred by the State Legislature. If passed Proposition 1E would have authorized a one-time reallocation of income tax revenue to help balance the state budget.

== Background ==
In February 2009, the State Legislature narrowly passed the 2008–2009 state budget during a special session, months after it was due. As part of the plan to lower the state's annual deficits, the State Legislature ordered a special election with various budget reform ballot propositions, among them Proposition 1E.

The proposition was part of Senate Bill 10 (Third Extraordinary Session), which was authored by Senator Denise Ducheny, a Democrat from San Diego. The bill passed in the State Senate by a vote of 36 to 2 and in the State Assembly by a vote of 76 to 4.

== Proposal ==
Proposition 1E would have authorized a fund-shift of approximately $230 million annually in income tax surcharge revenue currently earmarked for specified mental health programs under the terms of Proposition 63, also known as the Mental Health Services Act. For two years that revenue would have instead be used to pay for the state's share of the Early and Periodic Screening, Diagnostic and Treatment Program, a federally mandated Medicaid program for low income persons under age 21. At the time, revenue for this program came from the state's General Fund.

The earmarked Proposition 63 revenue that would be diverted comes from a 1% state income tax surcharge imposed on the portion of a taxpayer's taxable income in excess of $1 million. In the past, this surcharge has taken in between $900 million and $1.5 billion annually.

== Results ==
Proposition 1E
Choice	Votes	%
For	1,597,907	33.52
Against	3,169,163	66.48
Total	4,767,070	100.00
Valid votes	4,767,070	97.85
Invalid/blank votes	104,875	2.15
Total votes	4,871,945	100.00
Registered voters/turnout	17,153,012	28.40
