= BYD Seagull =

Battery electric city car

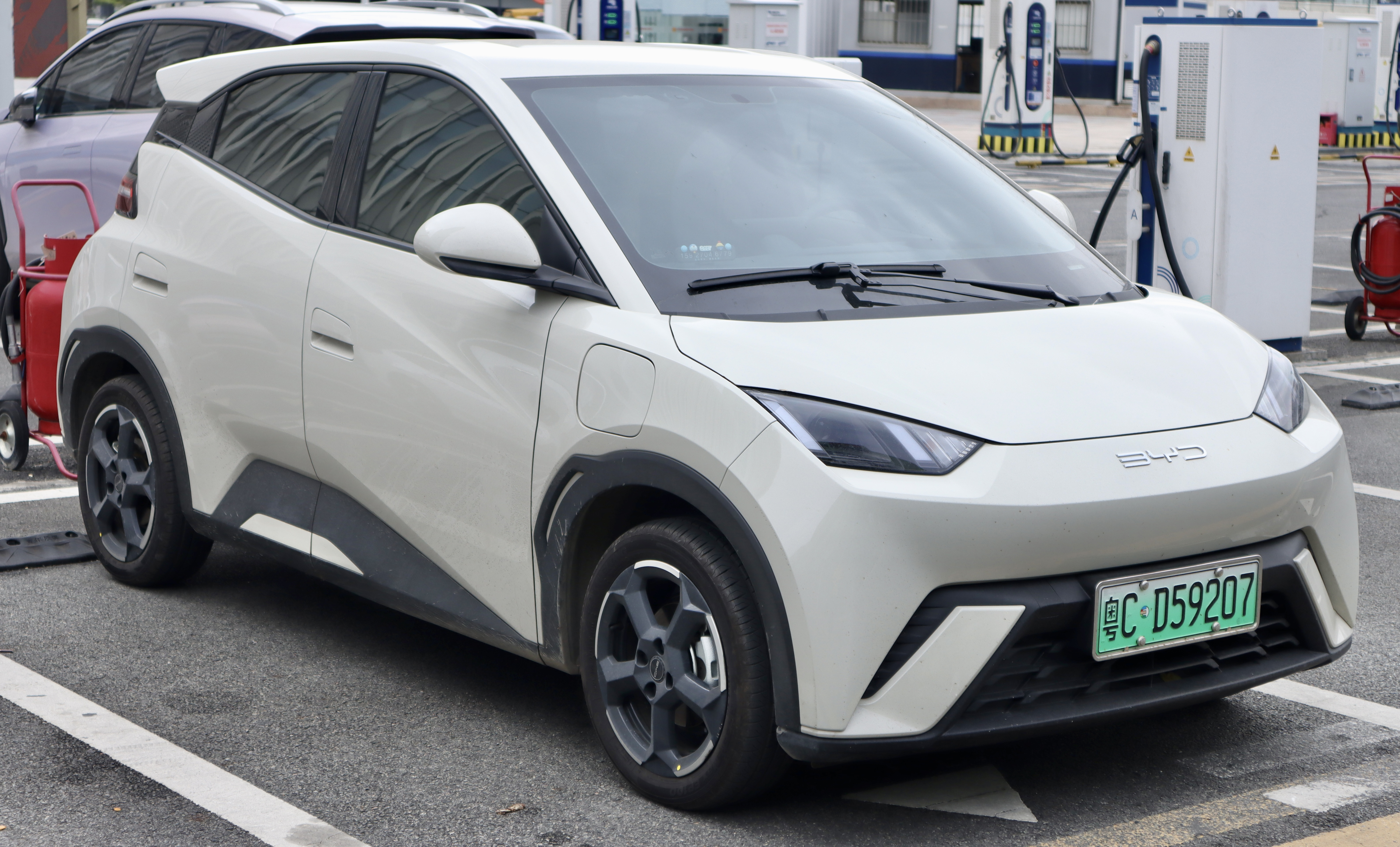

Overview
- Manufacturer: BYD Auto
- Also called: BYD Dolphin Mini (Latin America); BYD Dolphin Surf (Europe and South Africa); BYD Atto 1 (Indonesia, Thailand, Nepal, Australia and New Zealand) BYD Seagull Surf (Uruguay)
- Production: April 2023 – present
- Designer: Under the lead of Wolfgang Egger

Body and chassis
- Class: City car (A-segment) (first generation); Supermini (B-segment) (second generation)
- Body style: 5-door hatchback

Chronology
- Predecessor: BYD e1

The BYD Seagull (Chinese: 比亚迪海鸥; pinyin: Bǐyǎdí Hǎi'ōu) is a battery electric city car manufactured by BYD Auto since 2023. Positioned below the Dolphin within BYD's line-up, from its release to that of the Racco in 2026, it was the smallest BYD vehicle, occupying the A0-class in Chinese segmentation, roughly equivalent to the European A-segment. It is part of the Ocean Series product line and is marketed in China through Ocean Network branded dealerships.

The car is sold in some Latin American markets as the BYD Dolphin Mini, in Europe and South Africa as the BYD Dolphin Surf, where it received substantial styling and powertrain revisions ahead of launch, and in several Asia-Pacific markets as the BYD Atto 1.

== First generation (EQE; 2023) ==
First generation
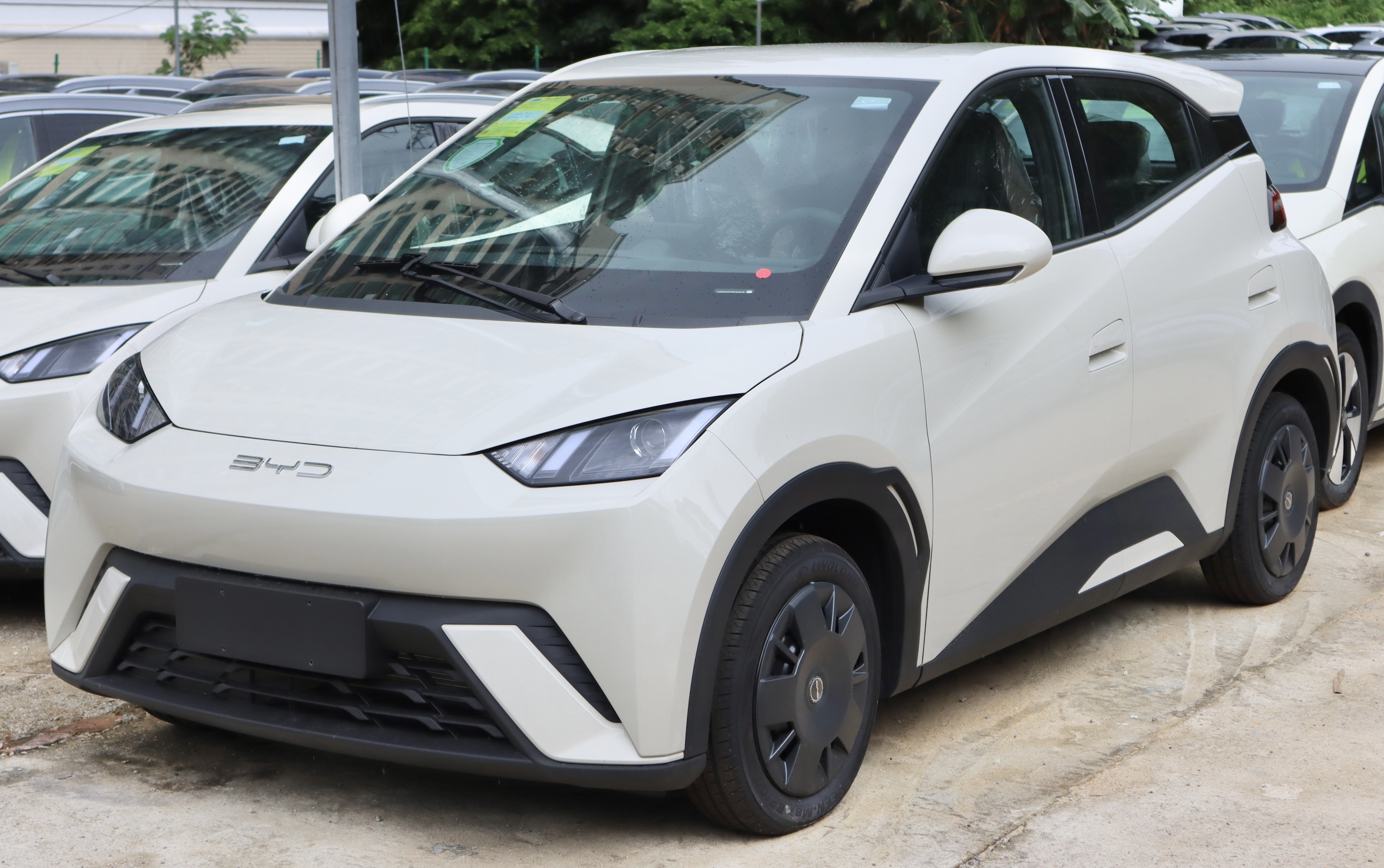

Overview
- Model code: EQE
- Also called: BYD Dolphin Mini (Latin America, except Colombia and Uruguay); BYD Dolphin Surf (Europe and South Africa); BYD Atto 1 (Indonesia, Thailand, Nepal, Australia and New Zealand)
- Production: April 2023 – present
- Model years: 2023–2026 (China)
- Assembly: China: Xi'an, Shaanxi; Changzhou, Jiangsu; Brazil: Camaçari, Bahia; Indonesia: Subang, West Java (BYD Auto Indonesia, 2026–present)
- Designer: Under the lead of Wolfgang Egger

Body and chassis
- Class: City car (A-segment)
- Layout: Front-motor, front-wheel-drive
- Platform: e-Platform 3.0
- Related: BYD Dolphin

Powertrain
- Electric motor: BYD 55 kW TZ180XSH PMSM; BYD 65 kW TZ180XSX PMSM; BYD 115 kW TZ200XSAU PMSM
- Power output: 55 kW (75 PS; 74 hp); 65–115 kW (88–156 PS; 87–154 hp) (Europe and Australia)
- Battery: 30.08 kWh LFP; 38.88 kWh LFP BYD Blade; 43.2 kWh LFP BYD Blade
- Electric range: 305–405 km (190–252 mi) (CLTC); 300–410 km (186–255 mi) (NEDC); 260–365 km (162–227 mi) (WLTP)
- Plug-in charging: 6.6 kW (AC); 30–85 kW (DC)

Dimensions
- Wheelbase: 2,500 mm (98.4 in)
- Length: 3,780 mm (148.8 in); 3,925 mm (154.5 in) (Indonesia, Thailand, Nepal, South Africa, etc.); 3,990 mm (157.1 in) (Europe and Australia)
- Width: 1,715 mm (67.5 in)
- Height: 1,540 mm (60.6 in); 1,590 mm (62.6 in) (Europe and Australia)
- Kerb weight: 1,160–1,390 kg (2,557–3,064 lb)

The Seagull was introduced on 27 April 2023 in China. Unlike its three-door rivals in the sub-100,000-yuan A0-class electric car segment, the Seagull features a four-seat, five-door configuration in a hatchback body style with a length of only 3,780 mm (148.8 in). According to Chinese publications, it is targeted towards younger customers seeking simpler means of transportation.

The exterior design of the Seagull combines numerous sharp lines, angular shaped headlights, and a sloping roofline with rear lamps connected by a light bar. Interior space utilisation is prioritised by increasing the wheelbase-to-length ratio to 66 percent, higher than the BYD Dolphin's 64 percent, along with the use of the thinner Blade battery. In line with other BYD Ocean models, the dashboard has a "wing" design depicting a seagull's wing with a two-tone finish, and is equipped with a rotatable 10.1-inch touchscreen infotainment system alongside a 5-inch digital instrument cluster.

The Seagull is equipped with six airbags, rear disc brakes, an electronic parking brake, and electronic stability control. Its body in white contains 61 percent high-strength low-alloy steel, with hot-forming used to achieve a tensile strength exceeding 1,500 MPa in key structural areas.

Following its world premiere at Auto Shanghai in the second half of April 2023, BYD began delivering the Seagull in China. Upon release, BYD received 10,000 orders for the Seagull within 24 hours. On 29 November 2023, the 200,000th Seagull rolled off the assembly line, only seven months after its introduction. Due to its low selling price, below CN¥90,000 or US$12,000, the Seagull also garnered curiosity and praise from international media and industry commentators.

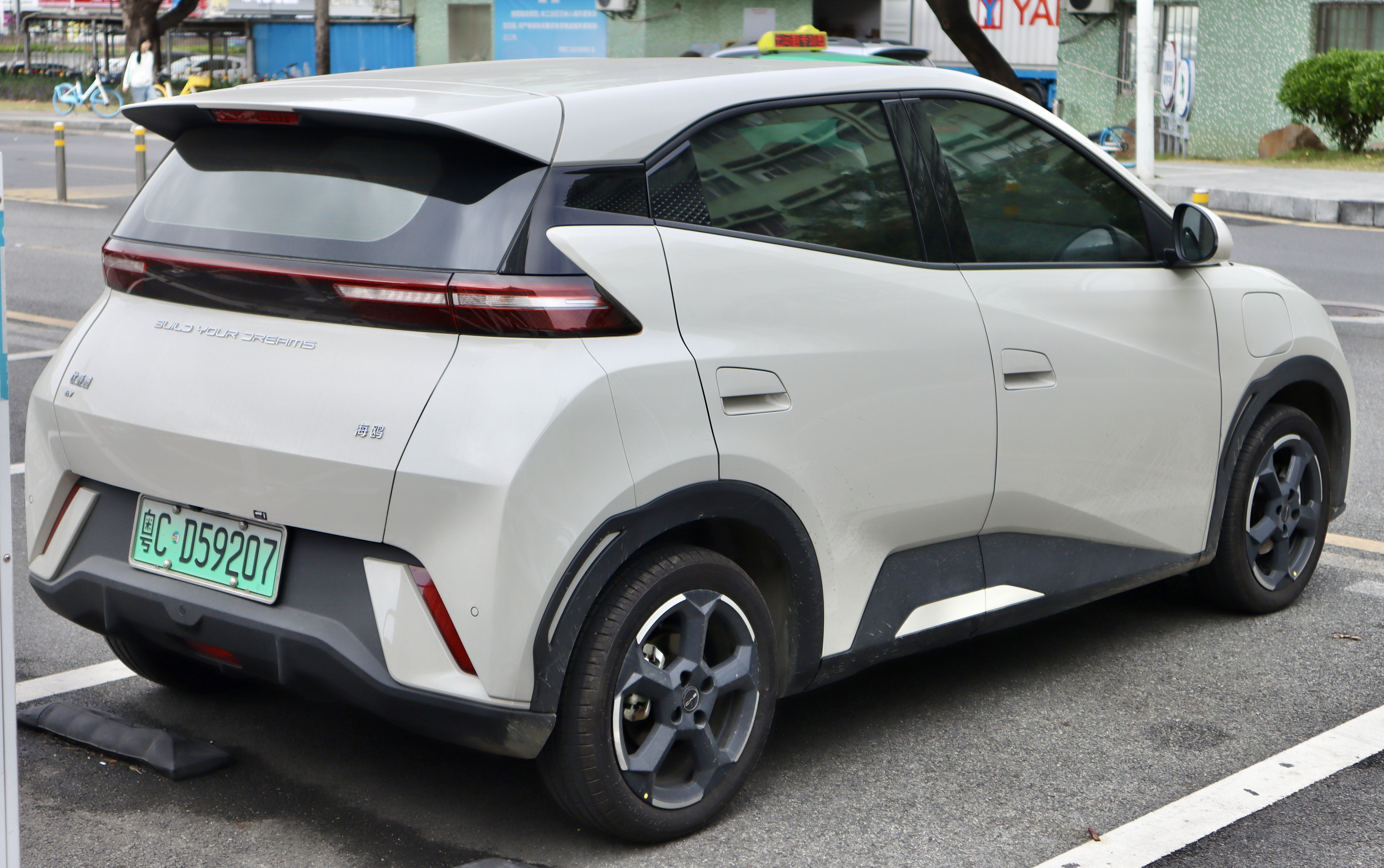
Rear view

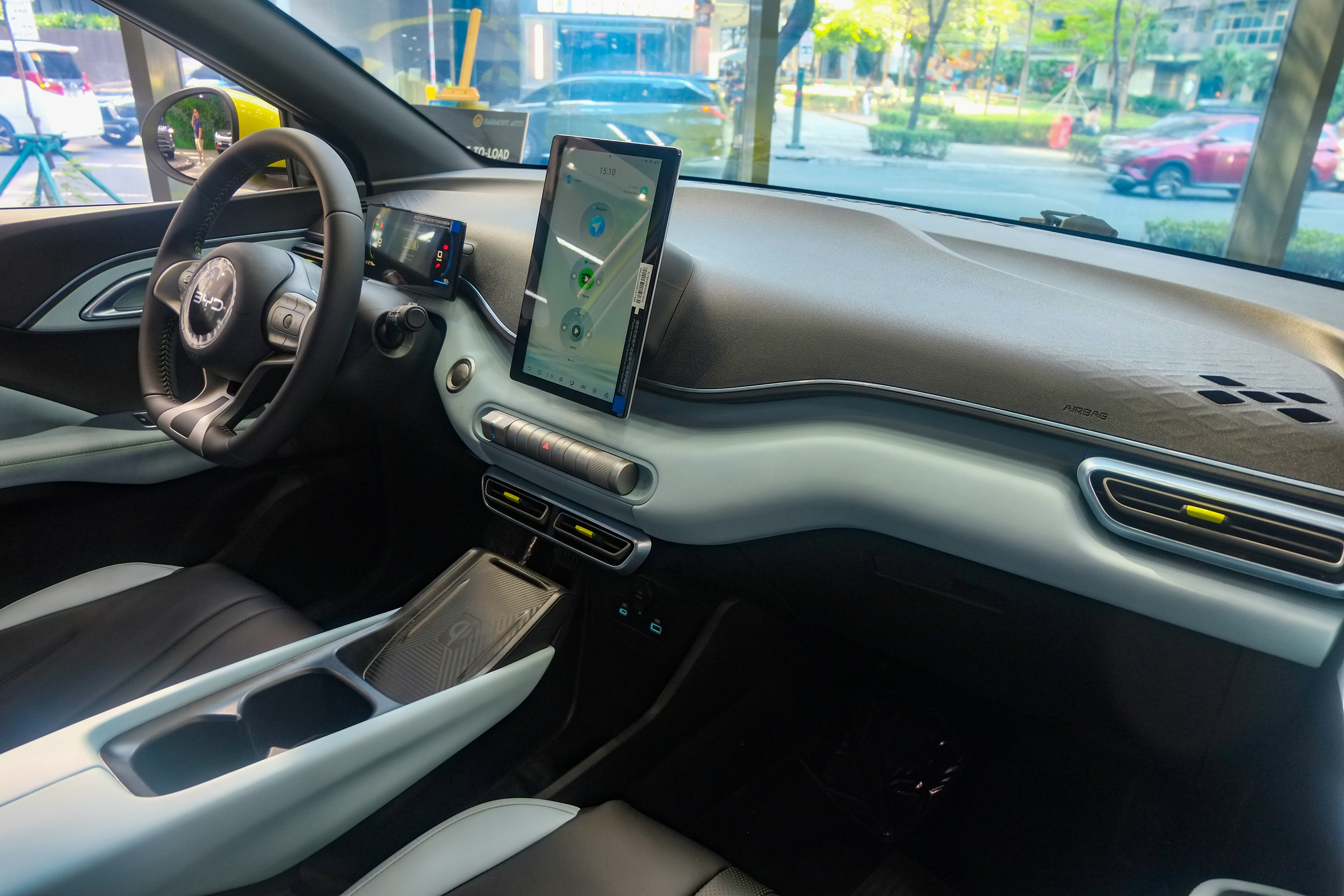
Interior

=== 2024 update ===
In March 2024, BYD reduced the price of the Seagull in China by five percent with the release of the Seagull Honor Edition as the 2024 model year. The Honor Edition introduced a new body colour, Ice Blue, paired with a Sea Blue interior colour.

=== 2025 facelift ===
In February 2025, BYD introduced an updated Seagull in China. It received a revised front and rear bumper design, updated interior elements, and the addition of BYD's advanced driver-assistance system, marketed as God's Eye C and DiPilot 100.

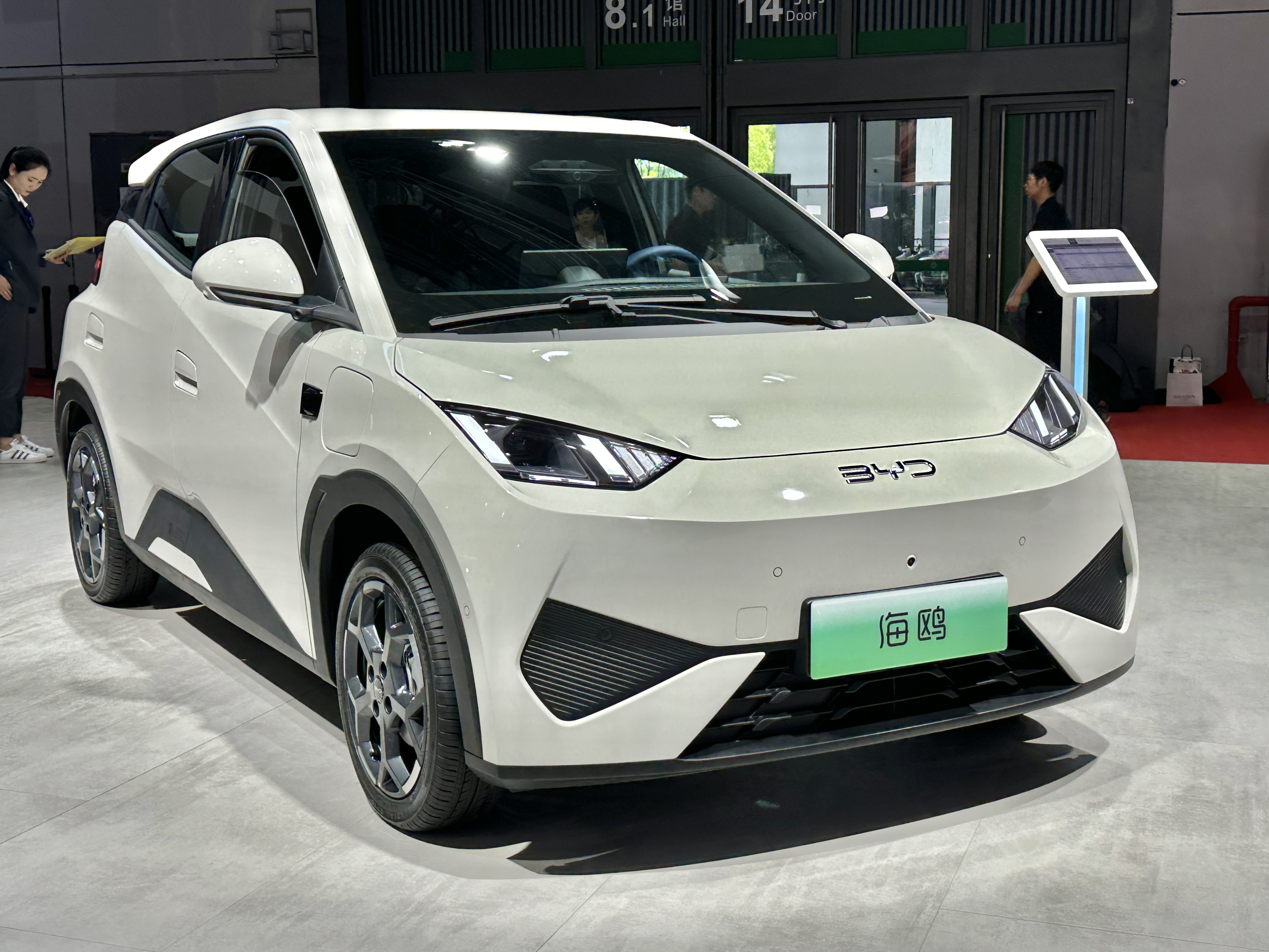
2025 BYD Seagull facelift

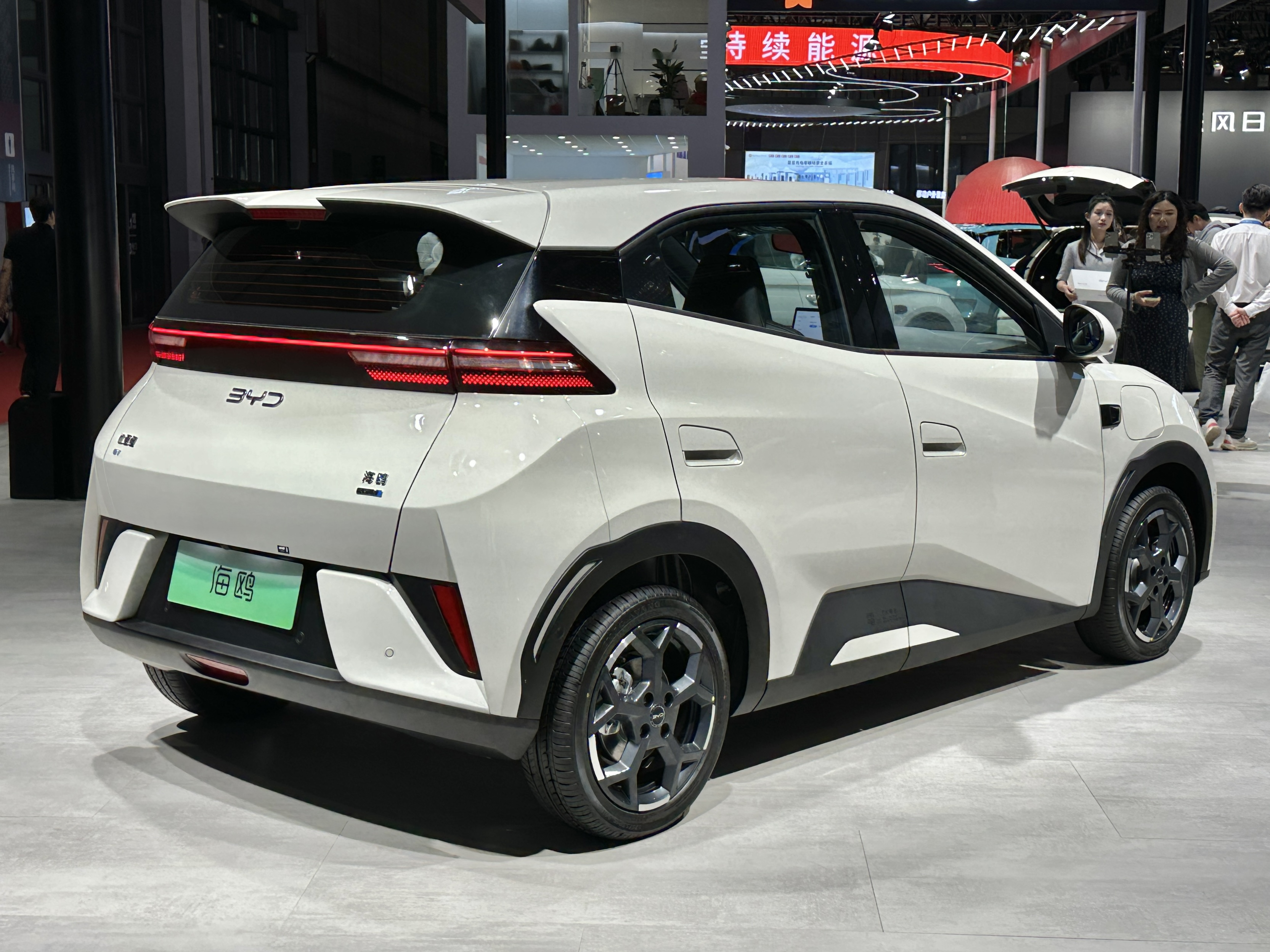
Rear view

=== Export markets ===
The Seagull has been exported since 2024, initially mostly to Latin American markets, before expanding to Europe, Africa, and Asia-Pacific during 2025 and 2026 under regionally specific names and, in several markets, substantially revised specifications.

==== Africa ====
===== South Africa =====
The Seagull was launched in South Africa as the BYD Dolphin Surf on 16 September 2025, in Comfort (30 kWh) and Dynamic (38.8 kWh) variants. At the time of its introduction, the Dolphin Surf was the cheapest battery electric vehicle on sale in South Africa.

==== Americas ====
===== Argentina =====
The model was launched in Argentina as the Dolphin Mini on 8 October 2025 as part of BYD's entry to the Argentinian market. It is available in GL (30 kWh) and GS (43.2 kWh) variants.

===== Brazil =====
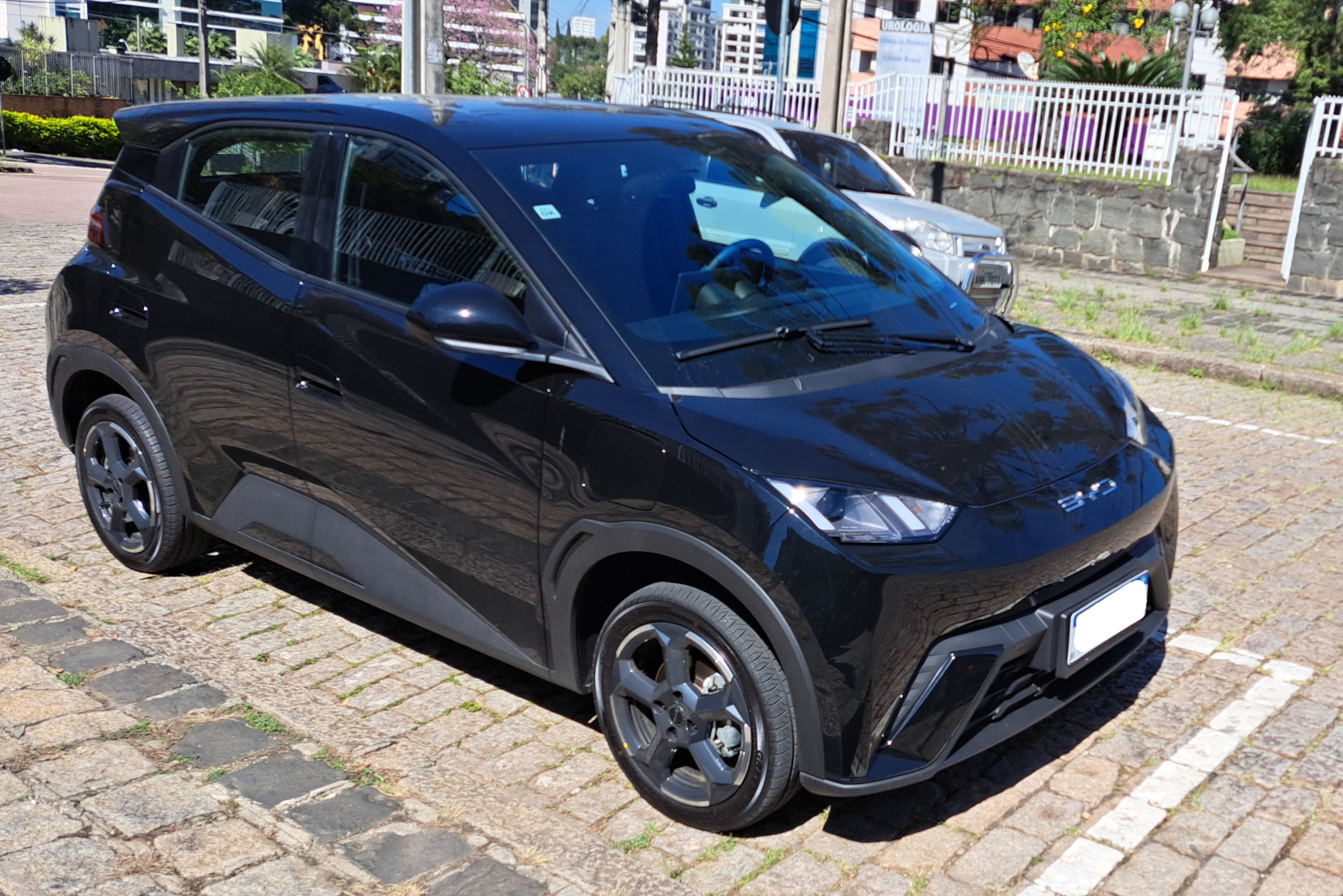
BYD Dolphin Mini in Brazil

The model went on sale in Brazil as the Dolphin Mini in February 2024. It is available in four-seat and five-seat versions, the latter added in July 2024; both are equipped with a 38.88 kWh battery. In early 2025, the Dolphin Mini began local assembly at BYD's Camaçari plant alongside the BYD Song Pro.

===== Colombia =====
The Seagull went on sale in Colombia in April 2024, in GL (30.88 kWh) and GS (38.88 kWh) variants.

===== Mexico =====
The model went on sale in Mexico as the Dolphin Mini in March 2024, in Dolphin Mini (30.88 kWh) and Dolphin Mini Plus (38.88 kWh) variants.

===== Uruguay =====
The Seagull went on sale in Uruguay in January 2024, in EV300 (30.08 kWh) and EV400 (38.88 kWh) variants.

==== Asia ====
===== Indonesia =====
The model was launched in Indonesia as the Atto 1 on 23 July 2025, at the 32nd Gaikindo Indonesia International Auto Show, in Dynamic (30.88 kWh) and Premium (38.88 kWh) variants. The Indonesian-market model shares the same front fascia as the European Dolphin Surf and the pre-facelift Seagull, rather than the 2025 China-facelift front end. The Atto 1 was updated in Indonesia in May 2026. It is assembled at BYD's newly built plant in Subang, West Java, and include equipment revisions such as the relocation of the electronic shifter to behind the steering wheel, removal of the rear window defogger, and the introduction of an entry-level STD variant.

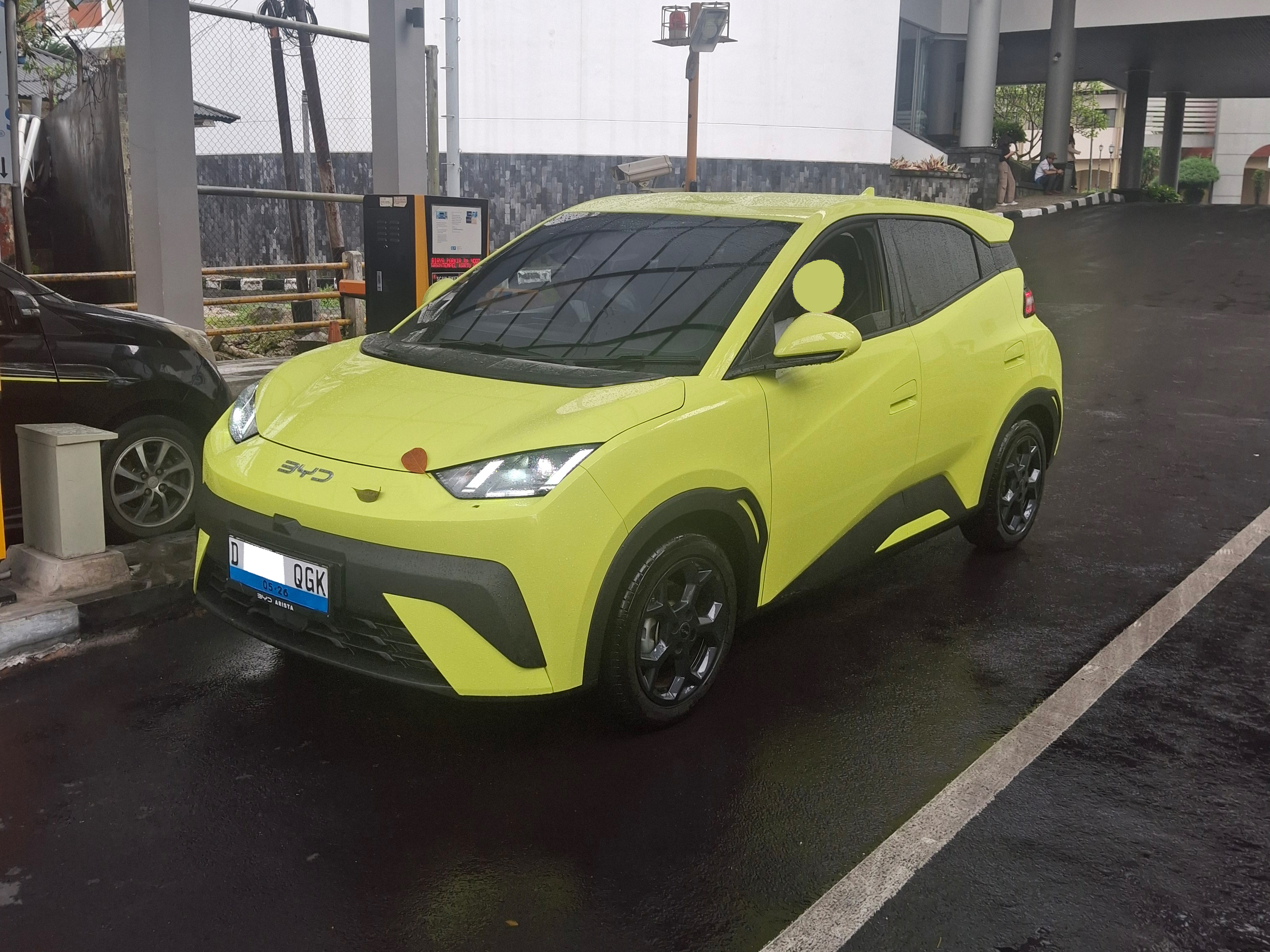
BYD Atto 1 (Indonesia)

Rear view (CKD Model)

Interior (CKD Model)

===== Philippines =====
The Seagull went on sale in the Philippines in October 2024, in a single variant equipped with a 30.88 kWh battery.

===== Singapore =====
The model was launched in Singapore as the Atto 1 on 10 September 2026, in the sole unnamed variant using the 43.2 kWh battery pack.

===== Thailand =====
The model was launched in Thailand as the Atto 1 on 23 March 2026, with Dynamic (30.08 kWh) and Premium (38.88 kWh) variants.

==== Europe (Dolphin Surf) ====
The European market model was introduced as the Dolphin Surf in April 2025, initially debuting in Scandinavian markets. The Dolphin Surf received a substantially revised front and rear fascia, and its overall length grew to 3,990 mm (157.1 in), 210 mm (8.3 in) longer than the base Chinese-market model. By BYD Europe executive Michael Shu's own description, the European Dolphin Surf was engineered as "a different concept, but still a Seagull". Local production had been planned to begin at BYD's Szeged plant in Hungary, though the timeline faced delays.

Three trim levels are offered, which are Active, Boost and Comfort. The entry-level Active trim uses the smaller 30 kWh battery paired with a 65 kW (88 PS; 87 hp) motor, while the Boost and Comfort trims use the larger 43.2 kWh battery paired with a substantially more powerful 115 kW (156 PS; 154 hp) motor, nearly doubling output over the entry variant and improving both acceleration and DC charging speed. The European-specification Dolphin Surf received a five-star rating from Euro NCAP in 2025.

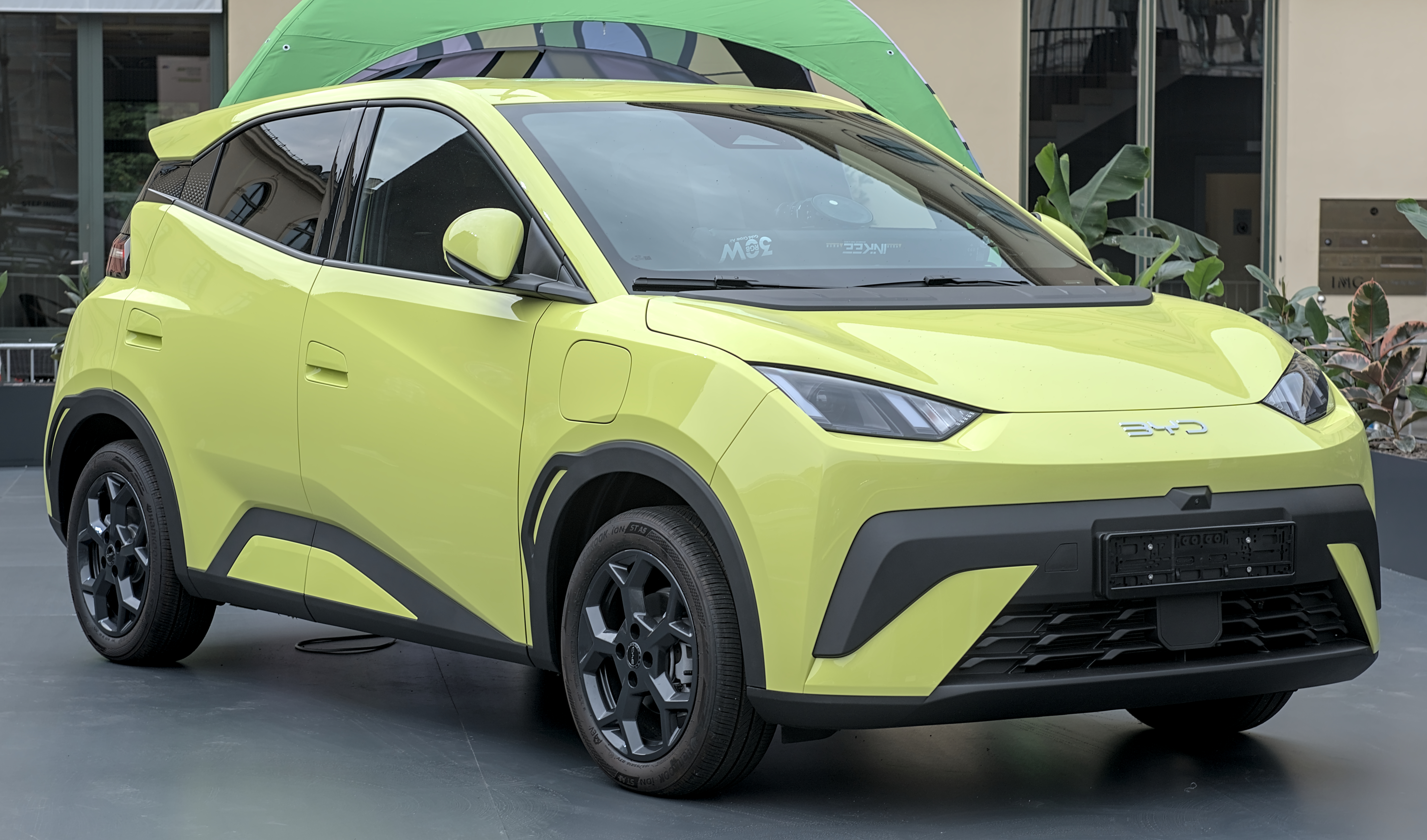
BYD Dolphin Surf

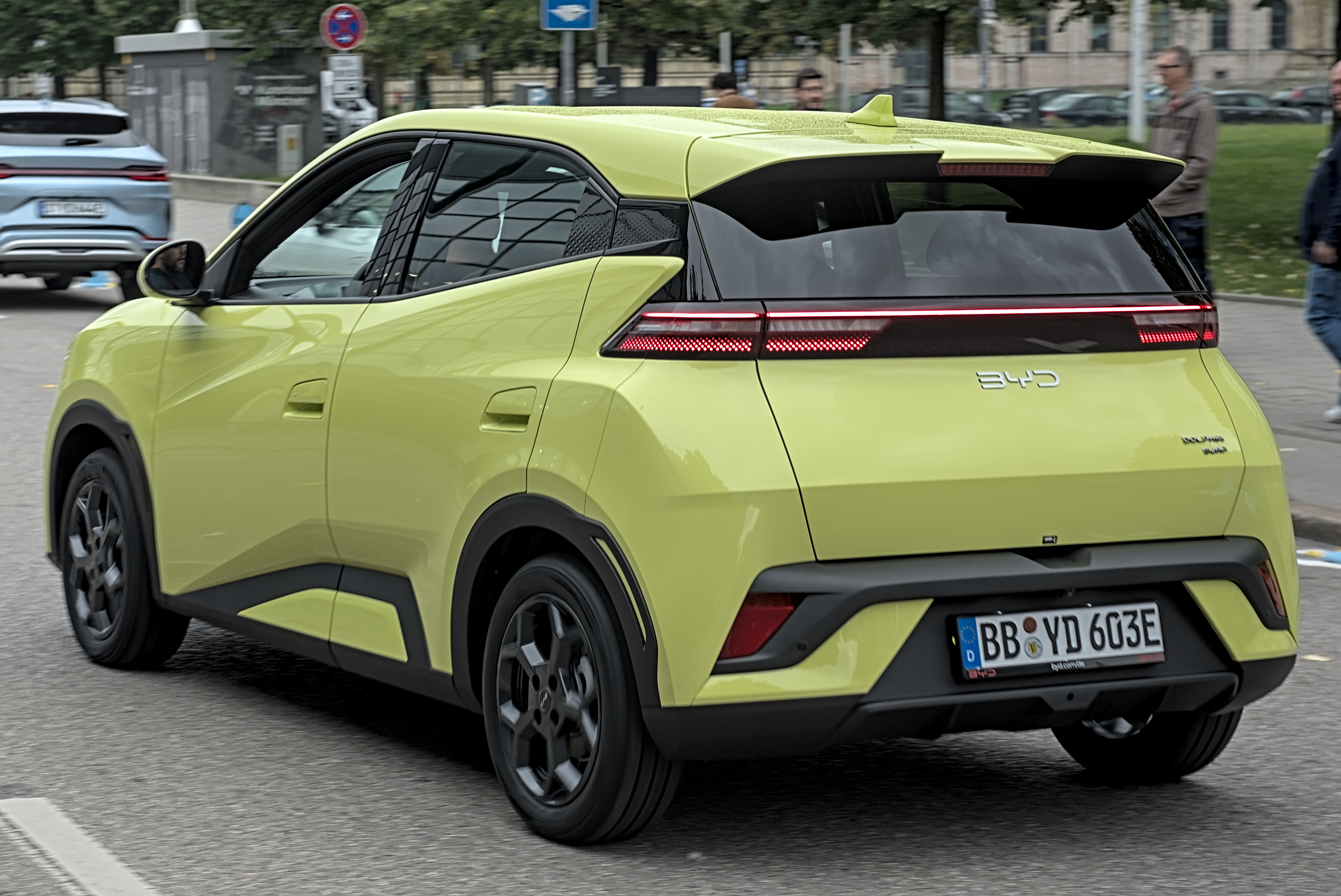
Rear view

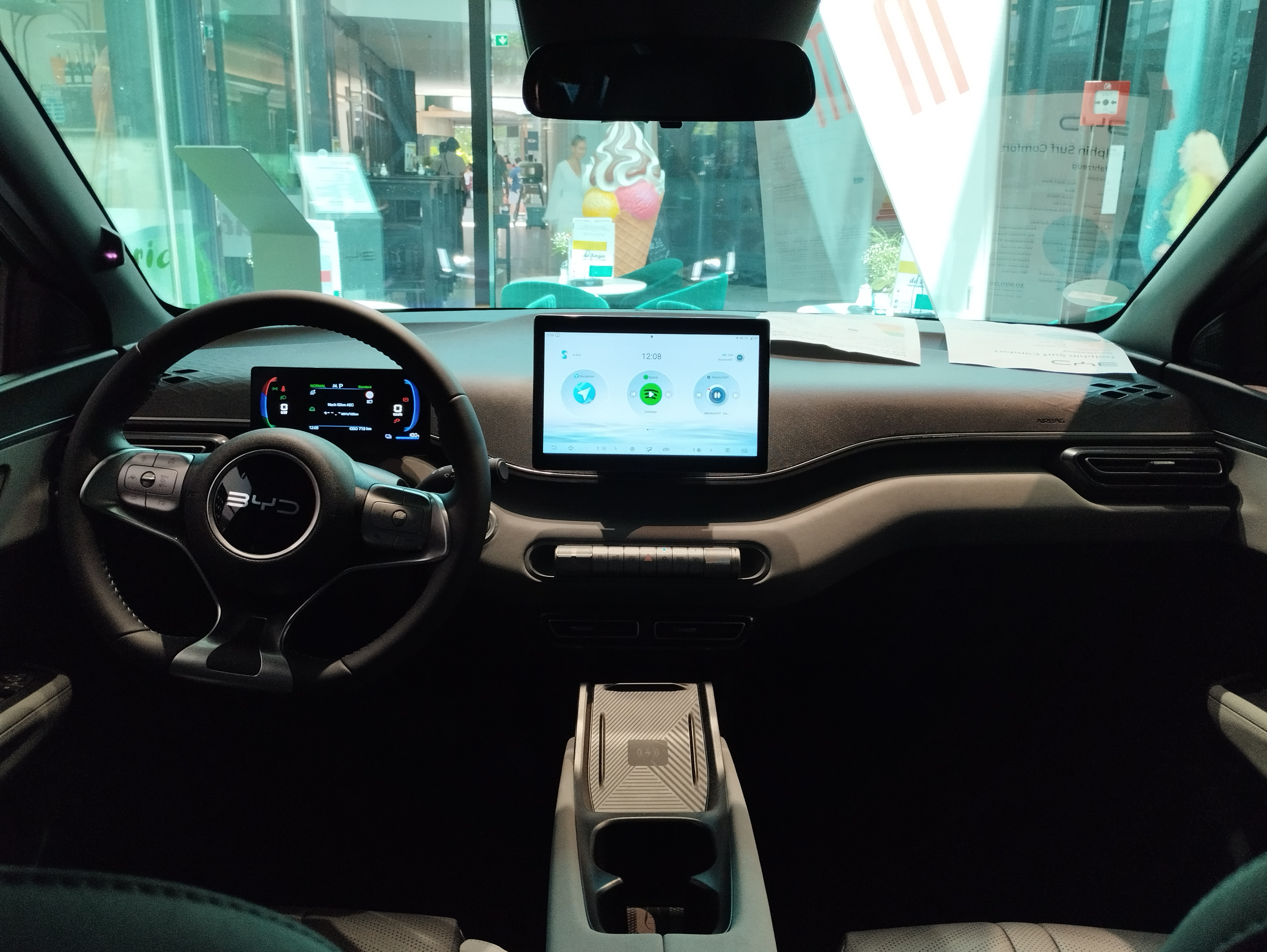
Interior

==== Oceania ====
===== Australia =====
The model went on sale in Australia as the Atto 1 in November 2025, with two variants: Essential (30 kWh) and Premium (43.2 kWh). In 2026, a price cut made the Atto 1 Essential the cheapest new car, electric or internal combustion, for sale in Australia.

===== New Zealand =====
The model was launched in New Zealand as the Atto 1 on 13 February 2026, with two variants: Essential (30 kWh) and Premium (43 kWh).

=== Specifications ===
In China, three trims are offered: a base "Vitality Edition" (Chinese: 活力版), a mid-specification "Freedom Edition" (Chinese: 自由版), and a top-specification "Flying Edition" (Chinese: 飞翔版). All three are powered by a single 55 kW (75 PS; 74 hp) permanent magnet synchronous motor driving the front wheels, with a top speed of 130 km/h (81 mph), a claimed 0–50 km/h (31 mph) acceleration time of 4.9 seconds, and a 0–100 km/h (62 mph) time of 13 seconds.

The Vitality and Freedom trims come with a FinDreams 30 kWh LFP Blade battery, giving a claimed CLTC range of 305 km (190 mi); the Flying trim uses a larger 38 kWh pack with a range of approximately 405 km (252 mi). The battery can be recharged via a household AC outlet at 6.6 kW, or via DC fast charging at 30 or 40 kW depending on the model, giving a claimed 30–80 percent charge time of 30 minutes.

==== Powertrain ====
Battery			Production	Range			Power	Torque	Kerb weight	0–100 km/h (62 mph)	Top speed	Peak DC charging
Capacity	Weight	Type	Production	CLTC	NEDC	WLTP	Power	Torque	Kerb weight	0–100 km/h (62 mph)	Top speed	Peak DC charging
Seagull
30.08 kWh	232 kg (511 lb)	LFP (Blade)	April 2023–2026	305 km (190 mi)	300 km (186 mi)	—	55 kW (75 PS; 74 hp)	135 N⋅m (100 lb⋅ft)	1,160 kg (2,557 lb)	13.0 sec	130 km/h (81 mph)	30 kW
38.88 kWh	293 kg (646 lb)	LFP (Blade)	April 2023–2026	405 km (252 mi)	380 km (236 mi)	295 km (183 mi)	55 kW (75 PS; 74 hp)	135 N⋅m (100 lb⋅ft)	1,240 kg (2,734 lb)	13.0 sec	130 km/h (81 mph)	40 kW
Dolphin Surf
30.08 kWh		LFP (Blade)	2025–present (Europe and Australia)	—		260 km (162 mi)	65 kW (88 PS; 87 hp)	175 N⋅m (129 lb⋅ft)	1,294 kg (2,853 lb)	11.1 sec	150 km/h (93 mph)	65 kW
43.2 kWh		LFP (Blade)	2025–present (Europe and Australia)	—		365 km (227 mi)	115 kW (156 PS; 154 hp)	220 N⋅m (162 lb⋅ft)	1,390 kg (3,064 lb)	9.1 sec	150 km/h (93 mph)	85 kW

=== Recall ===
On 30 April 2024, BYD issued a product recall for 16,666 Seagull units in China due to a reversing camera software failure. It affected units produced between 7 April 2023 and 31 May 2023. The recall was conducted through an over-the-air (OTA) update.

=== Safety ===
The European-specification BYD Dolphin Surf received a five-star rating from Euro NCAP.

Euro NCAP test results BYD Dolphin Surf LHD (2025)
Test	Points	%
Overall:	5 /5 stars	
Adult occupant:	33.2	82%
Child occupant:	42.4	86%
Pedestrian:	48.4	76%
Safety assist:	13.9	77%

ANCAP test results BYD Atto 1 (2025, aligned with Euro NCAP)
Test	Points	%
Overall:	5 /5 stars	
Adult occupant:	33.19	82%
Child occupant:	42.44	86%
Pedestrian:	48.39	76%
Safety assist:	14.27	79%

== Second generation (2026) ==
Second generation

Overview
- Production: October 2026 – present
- Model years: 2027 (China)
- Designer: Under the lead of Wolfgang Egger

Body and chassis
- Class: Supermini (B-segment)
- Layout: Rear-motor, rear-wheel-drive

Powertrain
- Electric motor: 95 kW TZ164XYB PMSM
- Power output: 85–95 kW (114–127 hp; 116–129 PS)
- Battery: 30.1 kWh Blade LFP; 39.2 kWh Blade 2.0 LFP
- Electric range: 320–420 km (199–261 mi) (CLTC)

Dimensions
- Wheelbase: 2,650 mm (104.3 in)
- Length: 4,205 mm (165.6 in)
- Width: 1,810 mm (71.3 in)
- Height: 1,570 mm (61.8 in)
- Kerb weight: 1,170–1,255 kg (2,579–2,767 lb)

The second-generation Seagull was launched in China on 20 October 2026. The model was enlarged in every dimension, with the length increasing by 425 mm (16.7 in) to 4,205 mm (165.6 in) and the wheelbase by 150 mm (5.9 in) to 2,650 mm (104.3 in), and it now seats five instead of four. The motor is now mounted at the rear and drives the rear wheels, replacing the front-wheel-drive layout of the first generation, and the rear suspension changes from a torsion beam to an independent multi-link design. All variants now use 16-inch wheels with 205 mm section width, compared to the 165 mm of the previous generation. It has a turning radius of 4.95 metres (16.2 ft) and a drag coefficient of 0.28 C_{d}.

Other changes include heated and ventilated front seats, and the addition of a 94 L (3.3 cu ft) front trunk, which supports a knock to unlock function. The cockpit features a 12.8-inch or 15.6-inch central infotainment touchscreen running the DiLink 150 system featuring customizable widgets, navigation bar, and shortcuts menu, split-screen support, and Deepseek AI model, but lacks a dedicated instrument cluster. The dashboard also features an accessory screw mount with power port along with magnetic accessory attachment points compatible with wireless shortcut button accessories. The center console features a row of physical buttons and toggles, a 50-watt active-cooled wireless phone charger, a storage cubby, and two vertically-oriented cupholders. It is available with an 8-speaker audio system and driver's seat massage function. The rear cargo capacity reaches 1,330 litres (47.0 cu ft) with the rear seats folded down.

It has optional DiPilot 300 driver-assistance system that uses a sensor suite consisting of one roof-mounted lidar unit, 3 mmWave radars, 11 cameras, and 12 ultrasonic sensors, and is capable of Level 2 supervised autonomous driving on highway and urban conditions including roundabouts.

Rear view

Interior

=== Powertrain ===
The model is offered with two battery options, with the two entry trims using an air-cooled 30.1 kWh battery, a motor rated at 85 kW (114 hp; 116 PS) and a CLTC range of 320 km (199 mi), while the three higher trims use a direct liquid-cooled 39.2 kWh battery, a 95 kW (127 hp; 129 PS) motor and a CLTC range of 420 km (261 mi). These three trims also support BYD Flash Charging, which BYD claims can charge the battery from 10 to 70% in five minutes and from 10 to 97% in about nine minutes at dedicated stations.

BYD says the second-generation Blade battery has 5% higher energy density, and the motor drive unit's power density is 94% higher than the previous generation.

Specifications
Battery		Power	Torque	Range	DC charging		Kerb weight
Type	Weight	Power	Torque	CLTC	Peak	Time	Kerb weight
30.105 kWh Blade	211.6 kg (466 lb)	114 hp (85 kW; 116 PS)	130 N⋅m (96 lb⋅ft)	320 km (199 mi)	33 kW	30–80%: 31 min	1,170 kg (2,579 lb)
39.225 kWh Blade 2.0	281 kg (619 lb)	127 hp (95 kW; 129 PS)	130 N⋅m (96 lb⋅ft)	420 km (261 mi)		10–70%: 5 min	1,255 kg (2,767 lb)

== Sales ==
Upon its release in April 2023, BYD received 10,000 orders for the Seagull within 24 hours. On 29 November 2023, the 200,000th Seagull rolled off the assembly line, only seven months after its introduction.

Year	China	Indonesia	Brazil	Colombia	Costa Rica	Uruguay	Total production
2023	239,270						280,217
2024	453,593		21,937	1,513	1,133	1,667	479,294
2025	310,956	22,582	32,490				529,537

== See also ==
- List of BYD Auto vehicles
