= NFW E.I =

WWI German fighter aircraft

General information
- Type: Fighter
- Manufacturer: National Flugzeug-Werk GmbH Johannisthal (NFW)
- Number built: 1

History
- First flight: 1917

The NFW E.I was a prototype fighter aircraft built in Germany during World War I.

== Design ==
The E.I was an all-wood single-seat monoplane powered by an Oberursel U.0 rotary engine. The wing had two spars between which the pilot's seat was located, but also a plywood trim. One prototype was built and flown in 1917, but the type did not enter production.

== Specifications ==
Data from , German Aircraft of the First World War

General characteristics

- Crew: 1
- Length: 6.5 m (21 ft 4 in)
- Wingspan: 10 m (32 ft 10 in)
- Wing area: 15.72 m^{2} (169.2 sq ft)
- Empty weight: 428 kg (944 lb)
- Gross weight: 620 kg (1,367 lb)
- Powerplant: 1 × Oberursel U.0 , 60 kW (80 hp)

Performance

- Maximum speed: 156 km/h (97 mph, 84 kn)
- Cruise speed: 132 km/h (82 mph, 71 kn)
- Time to altitude: 1,300 m (4,300 ft) in 6 minutes

Armament

- Guns: 1-2 × machine guns

== See also ==
Related lists

- List of military aircraft of Germany
