= Acireductone synthase =

Class of enzymes

Identifiers
- EC no.: 3.1.3.77

Databases
- BRENDA: enzyme data
- ExPASy: NiceZyme view
- KEGG: enzyme entry
- MetaCyc: metabolic pathway
- Rhea: reactions
- PDB structures: RCSB PDB PDBe PDBsum
Search
- PMC: articles
- PubMed: articles
- NCBI: proteins

Acireductone synthase (EC number 3.1.3.77, E1, E-1 enolase-phosphatase) is an enzyme with systematic name 5-(methylsulfanyl)-2,3-dioxopentyl-phosphate phosphohydrolase (isomerizing). It catalyses the following overall reaction:

5-(methylsulfanyl)-2,3-dioxopentyl phosphate
H_{2}O
P_{i}
1,2-dihydroxy-5-(methylthio)pent-1-en-3-one

The enzyme characterised from Klebsiella pneumoniae and rat liver hydrolyses 5-(methylsulfanyl)-2,3-dioxopentyl phosphate to 1,2-dihydroxy-5-(methylthio)pent-1-en-3-one and orthophosphate (P_{i}). This is part of the methionine salvage pathway. The crystal structure of the enzyme showed that the mechanism involves an enol of the starting diketone.
