= EPSDT =

Child health program

Early and Periodic Screening, Diagnostic and Treatment (EPSDT) is the children's health component of Medicaid. Federal statutes and regulations state that children under age 21 who are enrolled in Medicaid are entitled to EPSDT benefits and that States must cover a broad array of preventive and treatment services.

Unlike private insurance, EPSDT is designed to address problems early, ameliorate conditions, and intervene as early as possible. For the 25 million children enrolled in Medicaid and entitled to EPSDT in 2012, the program is a vital source of coverage and a means to improve the health and well-being of beneficiaries.

While a small number of cases and anecdotes regarding high EPSDT costs have garnered public attention, spending per child is low compared with worker-age adults and seniors covered by Medicaid. This is true despite the breadth of coverage provided to children through EPSDT. Children account for approximately half of Medicaid beneficiaries but only roughly 20-25 percent of the costs of the program overall.

With Medicaid and EPSDT, however, poor children's access to health care is similar to that of non-poor, privately insured children and child Medicaid beneficiaries use care in approximately the same pattern as their privately insured counterparts. On average, Medicaid costs per child are less than private insurance.

== History ==
EPSDT was enacted in 1967 as part of Medicaid as the child health component of Medicaid, with a deliberate focus on prevention and early intervention to reduce health problems among poor children and offer them equal opportunity to succeed in life. The design of EPSDT encompasses the vision of President Johnson and the Congress in order "to discover, as early as possible, the ills that handicap our children" and to provide "continuing follow up and treatment so that handicaps do not go neglected." While children were eligible for Medicaid from its original enactment in 1965, no specific standards related to child health coverage were included.

Within two years, however, policymakers would focus on the range and depth of Medicaid coverage for infants, children, and adolescents. President Johnson’s concern for the well-being of poor children was one political force. In 1967, as he transmitted his program for America’s children and youth, President Johnson said:

“Recent studies confirm what we have long suspected. In education, in health, in all of human development, the early years are the critical years. Ignorance, ill health, personality disorder--these are disabilities often contracted in childhood: afflictions which linger to cripple the man and damage the next generation. Our nation must rid itself of this bitter inheritance. Our goal must be clear--to give every child the chance to fulfill his promise.”

Another set of arguments in support of EPSDT was in a report on young men found unqualified for military service, which concluded that the majority of those rejected for service in the early 1960s failed as a result of physical and mental health conditions which might have been prevented or treated in childhood.

Over the past 40 years, federal EPSDT law has been amended and state efforts have evolved to match changes in standards of pediatric care, structures in the health care system, and our understanding of the physical, emotional, and developmental needs of low-income children. The amendments of 1989 clarified and broadened coverage to include all necessary diagnostic and treatment services approved under federal law.

The politics of EPSDT remain controversial. Some view the program as well designed and structured to meet child health needs, fitting professional guidelines and standards and focusing on prevention and optimal development. Others view the sweeping coverage as too generous for public coverage. As a result, the EPSDT benefit is guaranteed only for children with Medicaid coverage and not under other federal programs (see discussion below of CHIP).

== Design of EPSDT Benefit ==
EPSDT, as a set of benefits, offers a comprehensive approach to medical, dental, and mental health care for children which emphasizes prevention and early intervention. The core of the EPSDT benefit is a comprehensive, well-child visit known as an EPSDT screen. It must include: a comprehensive health and developmental history, comprehensive physical exam, appropriate immunizations, laboratory tests, and health education. The general design and content of the EPSDT screen is based on the Bright Futures guidelines for well child visits developed by the American Academy of Pediatrics and federal Maternal and Child Health Bureau, Health Resources and Services Administration, Department of Health and Human Services.

== Periodicity Schedule ==
The schedules for periodic well-child visits in EPSDT are known as periodicity schedules. States are required to develop schedules for periodic screening, vision, and hearing services at intervals that meet reasonable standards of medical practice. Federal law requires that states consult with recognized medical organizations involved in child health care in the development of their states’ EPSDT periodicity schedules. Alternatively, states may elect to use a nationally recognized pediatric periodicity schedule such as Bright Futures . A separate children’s dental periodicity schedule is also required. One has been developed by the American Academy of Pediatric Dentistry. Improving periodicity schedules can improve access to and utilization of child health services.

== Treatment and Medical Necessity ==
EPSDT also provides coverage for treatment. All types of child health conditions — medical, dental, mental, developmental, acute, and chronic — must be treated, including pre-existing conditions or those detected outside of an EPSDT comprehensive well-child “screening” visit. EPSDT coverage is set by a federal standard and goes beyond what states may cover for adults in Medicaid. Specifically, states are required by federal law to provide any additional health care services that are covered under the federal Medicaid program and found to be medically necessary regardless of whether the service is covered in a state’s Medicaid plan.

Some common EPSDT treatment and intervention services beyond what is typically covered for adults include: eyeglasses, hearing aids, orthodontia, wheelchairs and prosthetic devices, occupational and physical therapy, prescribed medical formula foods, assistive communication devices, personal care, therapeutic behavioral services, and substance abuse treatment Medicaid, as well as private insurers, will not pay for treatment for a covered individual unless they consider it to be medically necessary. In most private health plans, this means the service must be justified as reasonable, necessary, and/or appropriate, using evidence-based clinical standards of care.

For children, federal Medicaid law requires coverage of “necessary health care, diagnostic services, treatment, and other measures . . . to correct or ameliorate defects and physical and mental illnesses and conditions.” Thus, the EPSDT medical necessity standard assures a level of coverage sufficient not only to treat an already-existing illness or injury but also to prevent the development or worsening of conditions, illnesses, and disabilities.

=== Dental ===
Dental services must meet standards of dental practice. These standards should be determined by the state following discussion regarding the health of the child. Minimum services should include pain relief, restoration of teeth and maintenance for dental health. EPSDT individuals below the age of 21 are not to be limited emergency services. Medical care providers should provide direct referral to a dentist as part of a comprehensive EPSDT screening visit. If a condition requiring treatment is discovered for a child, EPSDT provides financing for nearly all medically necessary dental services.

=== Vision ===
Vision services, at a minimum, include diagnosis and treatment for defects in vision and eyeglasses when appropriate. Vision services must be provided according to a distinct, separate periodicity schedule developed by the state and at other intervals as medically necessary.

=== Hearing ===
At a minimum, hearing services include diagnosis and treatment for defects in hearing, including hearing aids. Speech, language, and hearing services are related and are covered when medically necessary.

=== Mental Health ===
Children’s mental health services are an integral part of the design and scope of EPSDT. From behavioral/social/emotional screening tests as part of EPSDT well-child visits, to diagnosis, to treatment, and systems of care, Medicaid and EPSDT are critical to financing evidence-based mental health services for children. Federal law requires comprehensive well-child examinations with screening services through EPSDT, including screening for potential developmental, mental, behavioral, and/or substance use disorders.

Where states choose, requiring providers to use objective and standardized tools to assess mental/behavioral/social/emotional health make the process more effective. EPSDT also finances diagnostic and treatment services, if medically necessary, for these conditions. Some states contract with managed care organizations or community mental health centers to deliver certain Medicaid financed services for children, and in other states Medicaid financing for children’s mental health services is administered by state mental health agencies.

== State Implementation ==
Federal law requires that children under age 21 who are enrolled in Medicaid be entitled to EPSDT benefits and that States must cover a broad array of prevention and treatment services. In turn, states have responsibility for certain policy implementation decisions. For example, states determine provider qualifications, set payment levels, create benefit definitions, and make medical necessity determinations.

As state Medicaid agencies adopt managed care approaches, Medicaid has evolved. Early studies of Medicaid managed care indicated that children may have received fewer visits or services. More recent studies point to states use of quality improvement projects, improved contracts, and other mechanisms which can optimize care. How states implement and manage EPSDT is important to millions of children, particularly the youngest and most vulnerable. To conform with the prevention and early intervention goals of the program, states need to ensure coverage of development screening, optimize the frequency of covered visits, and offer incentives to provide comprehensive, age-appropriate care.

Where states have failed to implement EPSDT law, families have sometimes brought lawsuits in an effort to secure a remedy.

=== Barriers to Care ===
Expanding health coverage for low-income since the mid-1980s has made a significant contribution to their appropriate use of health services and to their health status. While EPSDT is a primary reason for improvements in the health, barriers to care beyond coverage inhibit the potential of this benefit.

A number of studies have documented low performance of EPSDT programs in some states or communities. This includes the US Government Accountability Office, which has conducted a series of studies of EPSDT over the years.

In a 2010 report, the U.S. Health and Human Services Inspector General found that three out of four children did not receive all required medical, vision and hearing screenings under EPSDT. Moreover, nearly 60 percent of the children in selected states who had an EPSDT screening visit did not receive all five required components of the visit. Lab tests were most often missing.

By promoting and vigorously implementing the EPSDT program and its various components, states can improve the quality of health care, reduce the prevalence of preventable conditions, and have measurable impact. A series of 18 state leadership workshops on EPSDT identified key actions states can take to improve services, coordination, and administration.

State reports, research, and federal recommendations together point to several general approaches that states can use to reduce barriers and improve EPSDT. These are beyond efforts to ensure that eligible children are enrolled in Medicaid, and, where appropriate, connected to a managed care plan or medical home.

First, every state should adopt a periodic visit (periodicity) schedule that conforms to the model of the American Academy of Pediatrics. The visit content should conform to the Bright Futures guidelines. These professional guidelines are based on the best available evidence regarding what works for children in pediatric care and what can be achieved through well-child visits.

Second, states should clearly communicate to families and providers regarding the range of services covered. Federal law requires that states adequately inform parents about the benefits of EPSDT. Some states’ communications with parents have often focused primarily on screening and provided limited information regarding the range of treatment and intervention services that may be covered when medically necessary. In particular, offering training, clear provider manuals, specific website content, and routine communication can assist providers in delivering high-quality well-child visits financed through EPSDT, as well as visits financed by other payer sources.

Third, improving the quality and structure of services. Quality improvement projects and efforts to accurately measure program performance are important. Equally important is maximizing the available health professionals, including an array of physicians, nurses, and other in the delivery of EPSDT services. Use of a medical/health home and creation of integrated delivery systems also has shown promise for improving child outcomes, particularly for children with special health needs and chronic or disabling conditions.

Fourth, states’ use of case management and other mechanisms to coordinate services have the potential to connect families to appropriate and needed services. By strengthening the linkages between primary health care providers and other child and family services, case management and care coordination can better ensure that children receive needed services on a timely basis. Without these supports, children and families are more likely to delay or not receive services to address risks and prevent conditions from worsening. This work often demands strengthening state interagency partnerships.

Fifth, designing policies and delivery system structures that address the needs of children with special needs. This includes children with special health care needs, with mental conditions and disorders, those in foster care, adolescents in transition to adulthood, and infants and toddlers whose risks point to future health or developmental problems.

== National EPSDT Improvement Workgroup ==
In December 2010, the Centers for Medicare and Medicaid Services (CMS) convened a National EPSDT Improvement Workgroup that included state representatives, children’s health providers, consumer representatives, and other experts in the areas of maternal and child health and Medicaid. The members of the group provided advice to help CMS identify key opportunities for improvement of EPSDT. The group, which meets periodically, also discussed steps that the federal government might take in partnership with states and private sector organizations to both increase the number of children accessing services, and improve the quality of the data reporting.

== Related Federal Policies ==
=== Title V Maternal and Child Health Programs ===
Title V of the Social Security Act was enacted in 1935 as a health services safety net for all women and children. It was the first programs to provide grants to states to improve health. Today, the Title V Maternal and Child Health Services Block Grant continues as the only federal program with the goal of improving the health of all mothers and children. Title V is administered by the Maternal and Child Health Bureau, Health Resources and Services Administration, US Department of Health and Human Services.

From the beginning, EPSDT and Title V were linked in federal statute. Simultaneous amendments to Medicaid and Title V law were added in 1967 to create the framework for EPSDT. Between 1967 and 1989, Congress enacted a number of amendments to Title V, adding requirements to work closely with and assist Medicaid in a number of activities. Currently, the Title V law requires that state MCH programs to: assist with coordination of EPSDT, establish coordination agreements for with their State Medicaid programs, provide a toll-free number for families seeking Title V or Medicaid providers, provide outreach and facilitate enrollment of Medicaid eligible children and pregnant women, share data collection responsibilities, and provide services for children with special health care needs and disabilities not covered by Medicaid.

Reciprocally, federal EPSDT rules call for coordination with Title V. These requirements call for Medicaid agencies to: 1. establishment of written agreements which provide for maximum utilization of Title V-supported services and aims to improve child health status; and 2. reimbursement of Title V providers for services rendered, even if such services are provided free of charge to low-income uninsured families.

=== Children’s Health Insurance Program ===
The Children’s Health Insurance Program was created in 1997 and reauthorized in 2009. Known as CHIP, the program was enacted following the 1994 failure of national health reform. The purpose of CHIP was to expand health insurance coverage for targeted, uninsured, low-income children with family incomes below 200 percent of the federal poverty level. The program provides states with federal funding to expand health insurance beyond Medicaid eligibility levels. In some states, CHIP is administered as part of the Medicaid program (referred to as Medicaid expansion states) and the covered children are eligible for EPSDT benefits. In other states, CHIP may be administered by the state and designed similar to Medicaid but not provide full EPSDT coverage, or CHIP may be administered as a private plan without the more comprehensive EPSDT benefits. Separate administration has proved to be the more popular implementation approach, in large part because the funding for each state is limited and does not provide for an entitlement.

== Health Reform ==
Under the Patient Protection and Affordable Care Act Medicaid is expanded, particularly for adults. Only a small proportion of children are uninsured, an estimate 5-7 million. About half of the children currently uninsured are eligible for Medicaid or CHIP coverage but have not been enrolled in these programs. In some cases, eligible children are not enrolled because their parents are unaware of the potential coverage or are reluctant to apply for public benefits. Researchers at the Urban Institute estimate that, with full implementation of the health reforms contained in the Affordable Care Act, the number of uninsured children would be cut by 40 percent and the number of uninsured parents cut in half. The actual impact will depend on states’ implementation of Medicaid expansions.

Under the Affordable Care Act, states are required to continue current Medicaid and CHIP eligibility; however, they are not required to expand Medicaid. The Supreme Court decided in 2012 that the federal government may offer incentives for states to expand Medicaid but may not mandate such expansions. The number of states that will extend Medicaid coverage to individuals below 133 percent of the federal poverty level in January 2014 or thereafter remains uncertain. Overall, states’ decisions relative to Medicaid expansion are an important component of the national health reform plan.
