= E1 expressway (Pakistan) =

Road in Pakistan

E–1 Expressway
- Torkham Expressway تورخم بزرگراه

Route information
- Maintained by National Highway Authority
- Length: 110 km (68 mi)

Major junctions
- East end: Peshawar
- West end: Torkham

Location
- Country: Pakistan
- Major cities: Jamrud; Landi Kotal

Highway system
- Roads in Pakistan

The E1 Expressway or Peshawar-Torkham Expressway (Urdu: پشاور تورخم بزرگراه, Pashto: د تورخم بزرگراه) is a proposed controlled-access expressway which will link the border-town of Torkham to Peshawar in Khyber Pakhtunkhwa, Pakistan.

== Construction ==
In October 2007, the Asian Development Bank (ADB) approved a multitranche financing facility to Pakistan for the National Trade Corridor Highway Investment Program. In December 2007, tranche 1, a loan intended to cover the cost of the construction of the E1 and the M4, was approved. Tranche 1 was supposed to finance the construction of E1, however, on 30 September 2008, the government requested that the ADB not deliver the entirety of Tranche 1 due to the "security situation in the project area" for E1. Also due to the security situation, 34 km of the E1 were dropped. A World Bank project was approved for the E1 in October 2019.

== See also ==
- E75 Murree Expressway
