= DIGITAL Q1 =

The Digital Q1 was a FUJIFILM digital camera model announced in 2003.

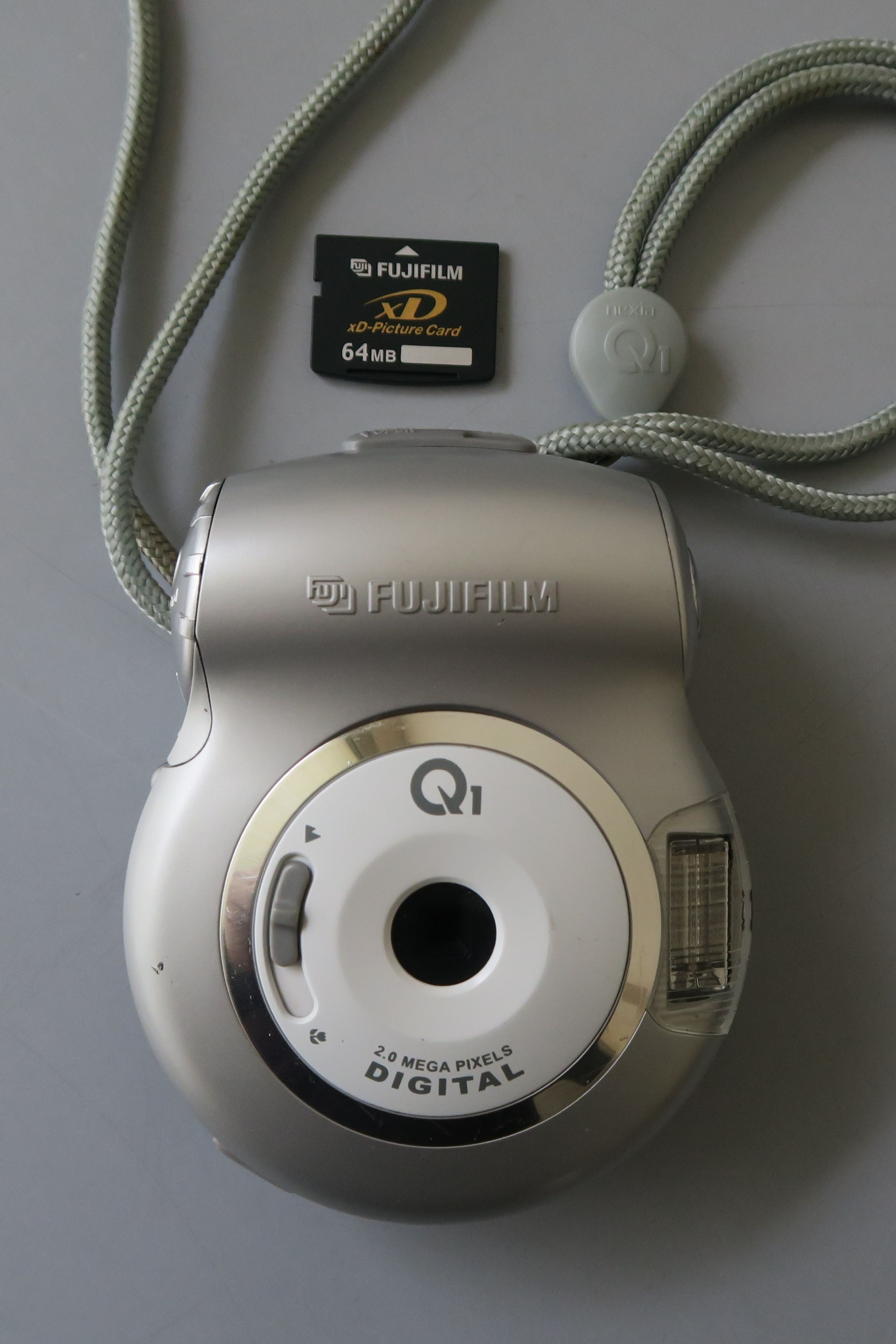
Fujifilm DIGITAL Q1

Its expected street price was listed at around £100.

== Features ==
The Digital Q1 is a compact 2 megapixel digital camera described as a budget beginners camera. The camera has 3 resolutions, plus a function to record compressed, low-resolution video (AVI format). It can be used as a webcam via the USB port. The DIGITAL Q1 is a low-cost, beginners model – only date and time need to be set. A 16 Mbyte xD card is included. The camera includes a battery-backed clock, allowing time and date to be included in the Exif record, which also includes shutter times. There are menu options to adjust brightness (and other) parameters, with little effect – the firmware aligns to a medium result.

- 1/2" CMOS sensor
- 4x digital zoom
- ISO 100, 200
- Built in flash
- Red-eye reduction
- Focal length = 46mm on a 35mm camera
- 1.5" colour LCD screen
- Focus: 120 cm to infinity
- Macro focus: approx. 60 to 120 cm
- File format: JPEG, AVI
- Memory: 8MB internal, optional xD-Picture Card
- USB output and cable
- Batteries: 2 x AA alkaline
- Neck strap

== Reception ==
Computer Active criticized the lack of optical zoom and plastic body, and rated the camera 3 out of 5 stars, saying: "As a fun snapper for holidays, nights out, or maybe as a first camera for the kids, it has plenty going for it. Serious photo fans should keep shopping."
