= BYD F0 =

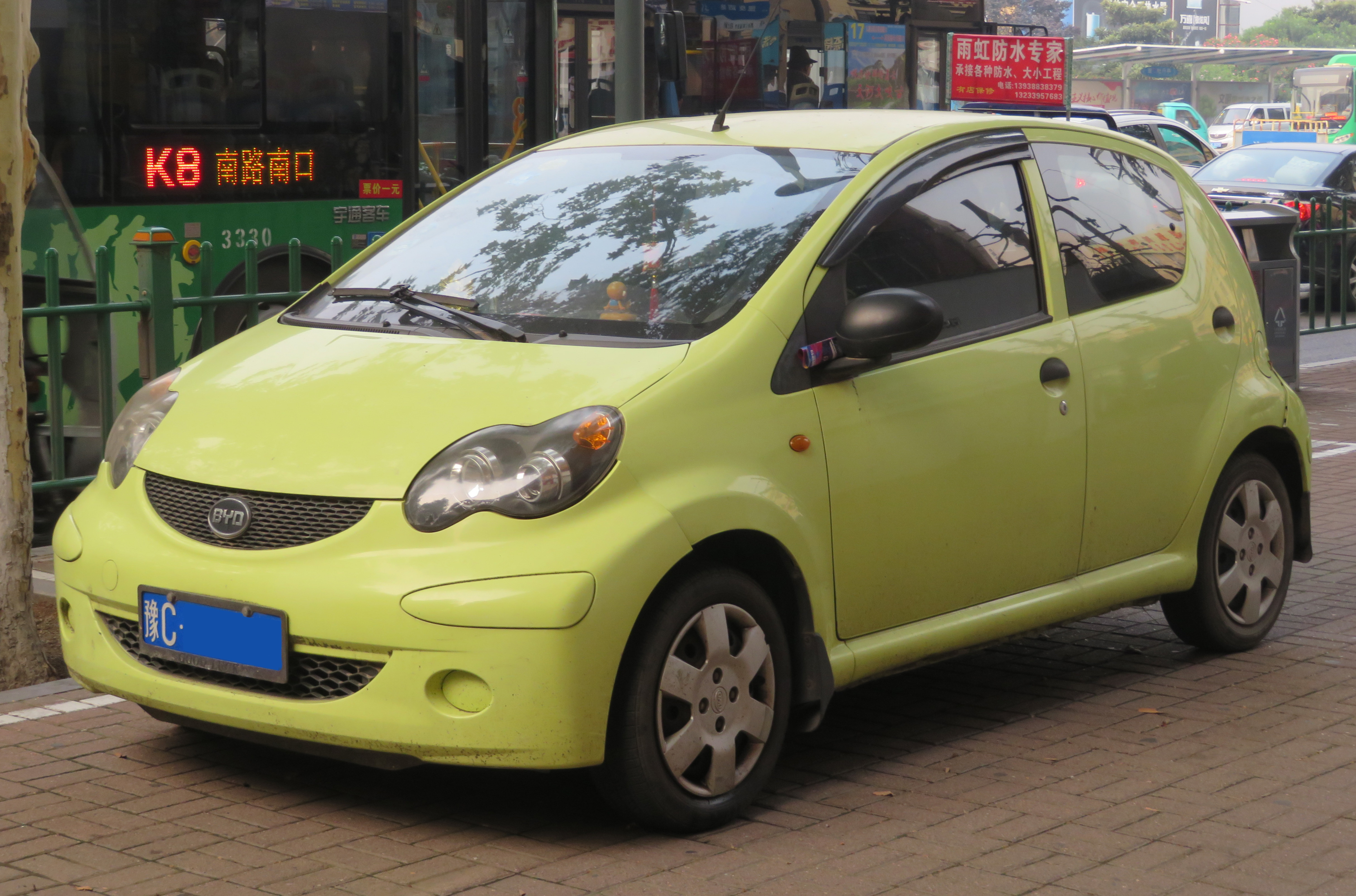
- BYD F0 (pre-facelift, 2009)

Overview
- Manufacturer: BYD Auto
- Also called: BYD F1; BYD e1 (electric version)
- Production: 2008–2015 (ICE version); 2019–2020 (electric version)

Body and chassis
- Class: City car
- Body style: 5-door hatchback
- Layout: Front-engine, front-wheel-drive

Powertrain
- Engine: 1.0 L BYD371QA I3 (petrol)
- Electric motor: 45 kW (61.2 PS; 60.3 hp) Permanent magnet synchronous drive motor
- Transmission: 5-speed manual; 5-speed automatic; Electric Automatic
- Battery: 32.2 kWh Ni-Co lithium manganate battery

Dimensions
- Wheelbase: 2,340 mm (92.1 in)
- Length: 3,460 mm (136.2 in)
- Width: 1,618 mm (63.7 in)
- Height: 1,465 mm (57.7 in)
- Curb weight: 870 kg (1,918 lb)

Chronology
- Predecessor: BYD Flyer
- Successor: BYD Seagull (electric version)

The BYD F0, formerly known as BYD F1, is a city car produced by the Chinese manufacturer BYD. It was introduced in July 2008 and was produced until 2015. Although petrol versions were discontinued, a subsequent electric version, branded under the new "e series" was launched in 2019 as the BYD e1.

The F0 was unveiled at the 2007 Guangzhou motor show. The car was priced in 2009 at approximately US$6,700, and reportedly gets 56 mpg_{‑US} (4.2 L/100 km; 67 mpg_{‑imp}).

== Specifications ==
Its 1.0 liter petrol engine produces 50 kW (68 PS; 67 hp) at 6000 rpm and top Torque of 90 N⋅m (66 lb⋅ft) from 4000 rpm to 4500 rpm. This engine can accelerate the car from 0 to 100 km/h (62 mph) in 12.80 seconds. The design is an unlicensed copy of the European Toyota Aygo.

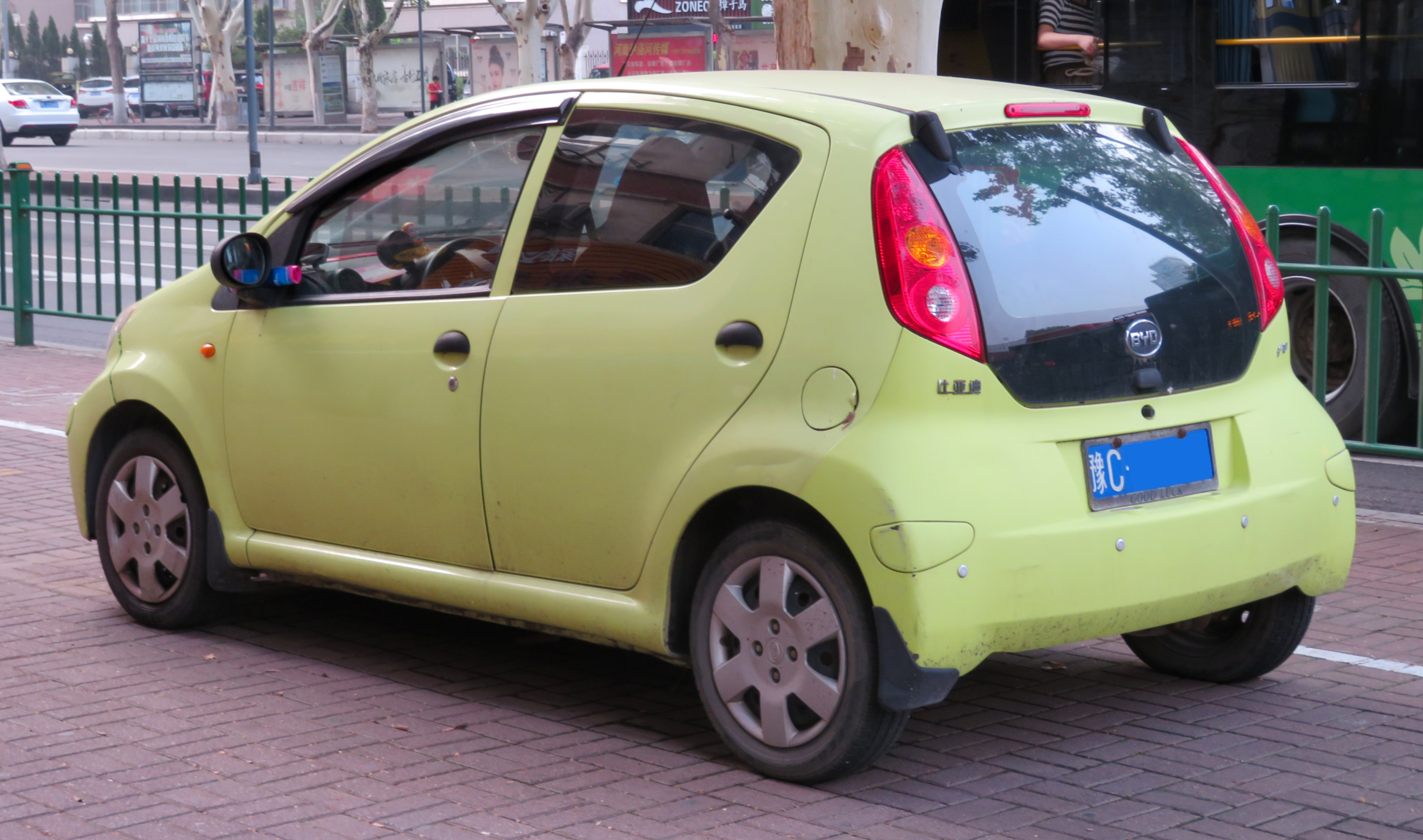
Rear view (pre-facelift, 2008–2014)

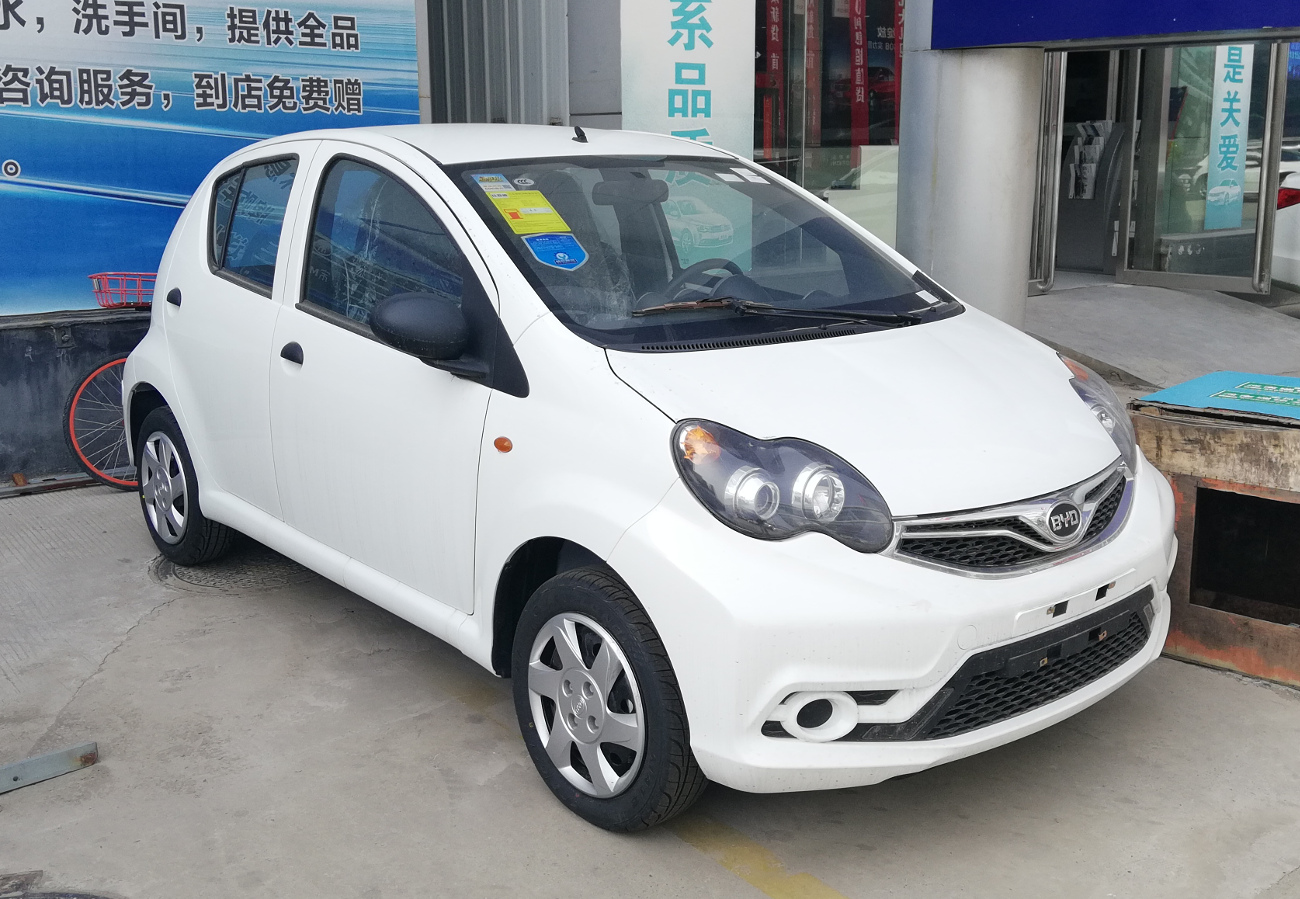
BYD F0 (facelift, 2015)

=== Safety ===
The Chinese-made F0 in its most basic Latin American market configuration with no airbags, no ABS and no ESC received 0 stars for adult occupants and 1 star for toddlers from Latin NCAP 2.0 in 2016.

Latin NCAP 2.0 test results BYD F0 - NO Airbags (2016, based on Euro NCAP 2008)
Test	Points	Stars
Adult occupant:	0.00/34.0	0 /5 stars
Child occupant:	12.65/49.00	1 /5 stars

== BYD e1 ==
The BYD e1 is the electric version of the BYD F0. The BYD e1 was introduced in 2019, featuring a front positioned 45 kW and 110N-m electric motor powering the front wheels.

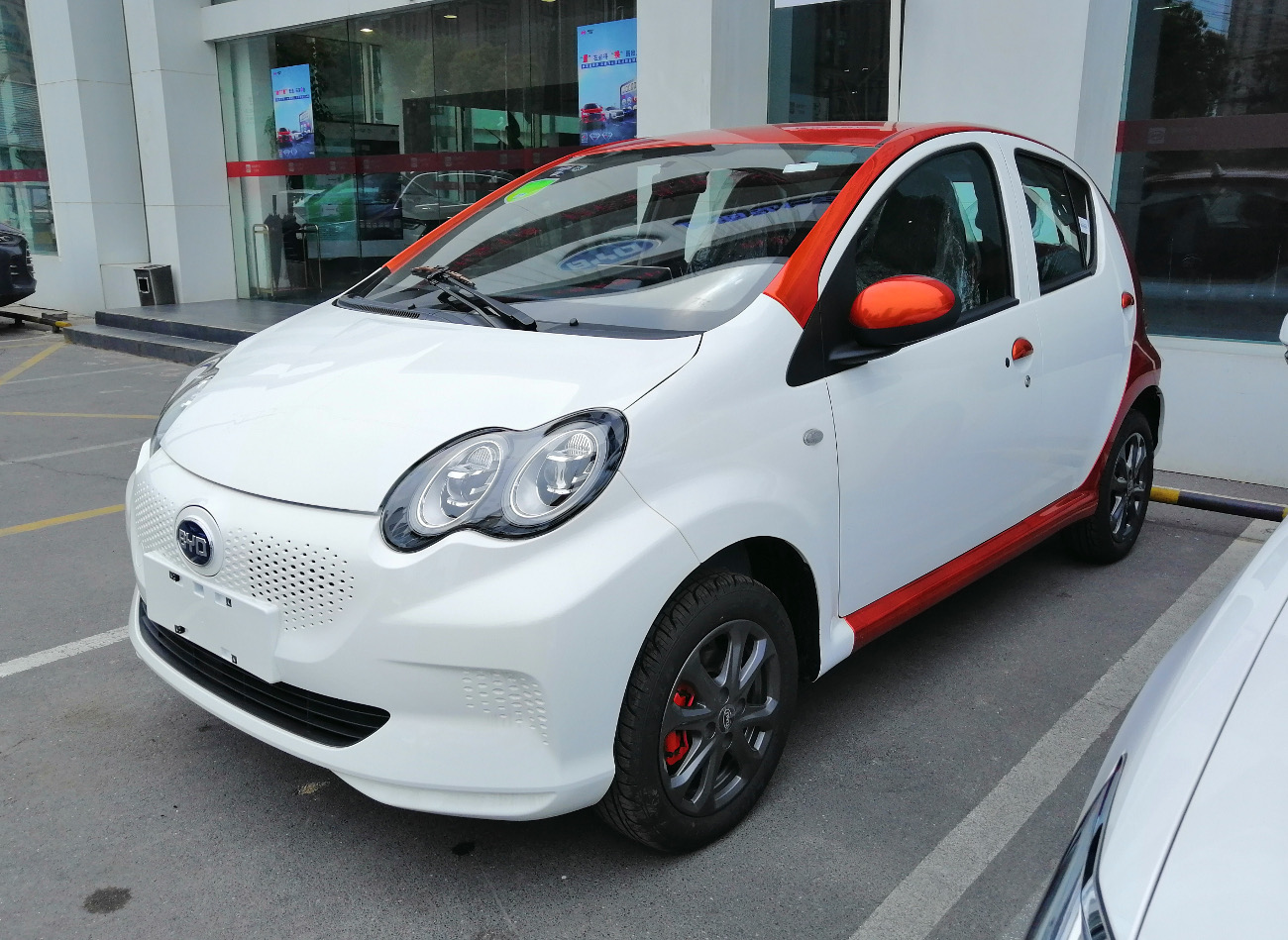
Front view

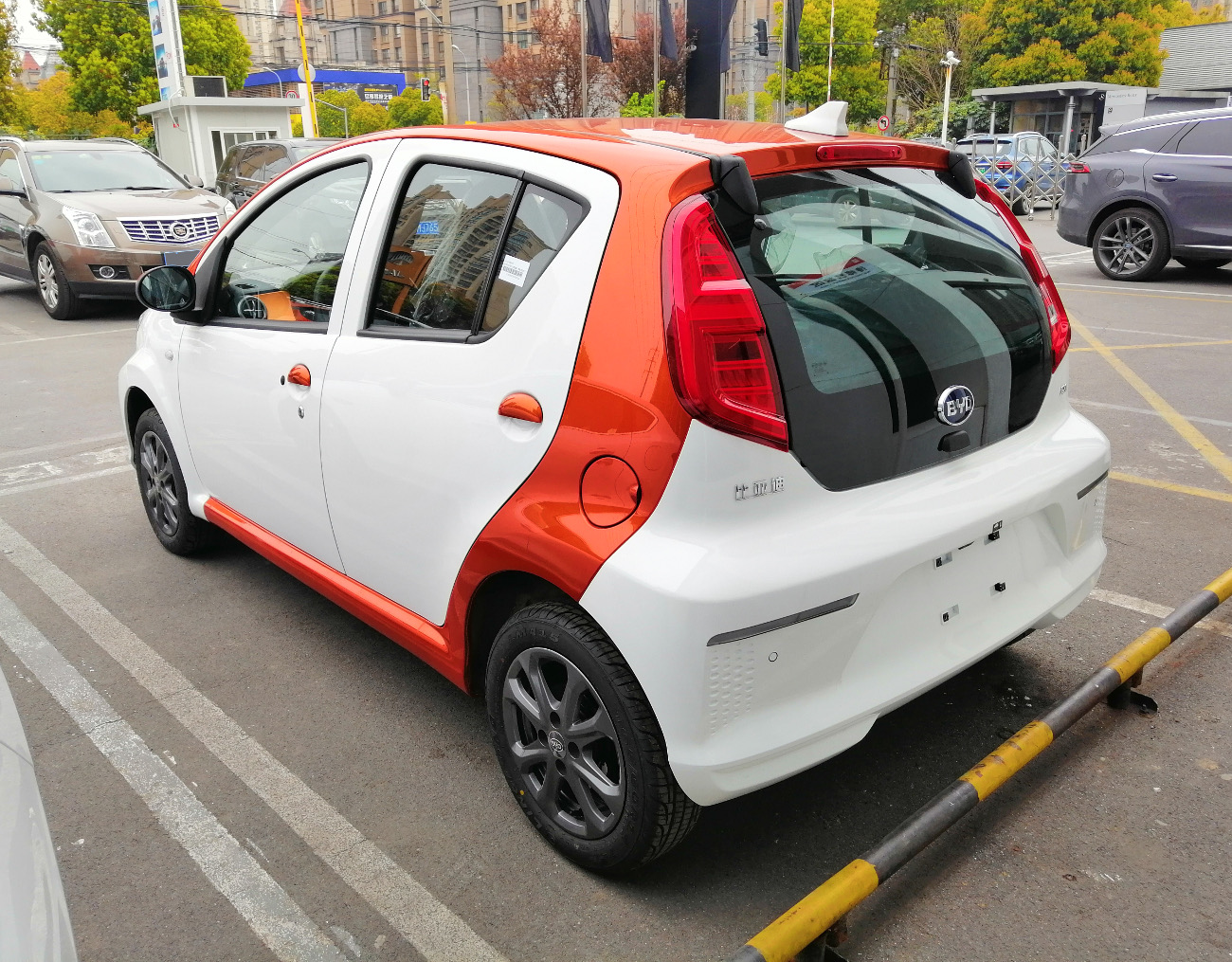
Rear view
