= 5M =

5M or 5-M may refer to:

- 5M model, a troubleshooting and risk-management model used for aviation safety
- Sibaviatrans (IATA code), a former airline
- 5M, a Toyota M engine
- 5M, a model of HP LaserJet 5
- Shada (Doctor Who) (production code: 5M), an unfinished Doctor Who serial

== See also ==
- M5 (disambiguation)
