= M5 =

M5, M-5, M.5, M-V, or M05 may refer to:

== Transportation ==
=== Automobiles ===
- AITO M5, a Chinese mid-size crossover SUV
- BMW M5, a German mid-size performance car series
- Dongfeng Fengxing Lingzhi M5, a Chinese MPV
- Haima M5, a Chinese compact sedan
- JAC Refine M5, a Chinese MPV
- Studebaker M5, an American pickup truck

=== Aviation and aerospace ===
- M-5 rocket, a Japanese rocket
- Macchi M.5, an Italian flying boat fighter in service from 1917 until the mid-1920s
- Miles M.5 Sparrowhawk, a 1930s British single-seat racing and touring monoplane
- Fokker M.5, a 1913 unarmed single-seat monoplane aircraft
- Grigorovich M-5, a Russian World War I-era biplane flying boat
- Kenmore Air (IATA airline designator: M5), a small airline based in the United States

=== Military ===
- M5 Stuart, a variant of the Stuart tank, a World War II-era American light tank
- M5 half-track, a variant of the M3 Half-track military armored personnel carrier
- M5 tractor, World War II-era artillery-towing tractor
- M5 bomb trailer, a U.S. vehicle for transporting bombs to airplanes
- M5 bayonet
- Brixia M.5, an Italian 7.92x57mm caliber light machine gun
- 3-inch gun M5, a U.S. Army anti-tank gun
- MSwMS M5, a Swedish Navy minesweeper 1940–1955
- M5 firing device, a trigger commonly used in booby traps
- M7 next-generation squad weapon, the future designation for the SIG MCX Spear, formerly known as the XM5

=== Roads and routes ===
==== Africa ====
- M5 (Cape Town), a Metropolitan Route in Cape Town, South Africa
- M5 (Johannesburg), a Metropolitan Route in Johannesburg, South Africa
- M5 (Port Elizabeth), a Metropolitan Route in Port Elizabeth, South Africa
- M5 (Pretoria), a Metropolitan Route in Pretoria, South Africa
- M5 road (Zambia), a short road in Mufulira, Zambia

==== Americas ====
- M-5 (Michigan highway), a state highway in the Detroit area
- M5 (New York City bus), a New York City Bus route in Manhattan

==== Asia ====
For Russia see Europe

- M-5 motorway (Pakistan)
- M5 (Durban), a Metropolitan Route in Durban, South Africa
- M5 (East London), a Metropolitan Route in East London, South Africa
- M5 (Istanbul Metro), a subway line on the Asian side of Istanbul, Türkiye
- M5 road (Malawi)
- M5 motorway (Syria), a motorway which connects the Syrian border with Jordan in the south with Damascus, and continues further north to Aleppo, to the border with Turkey

==== Australasia ====
- M5 Motorway (Sydney), in Sydney, Australia
- Metroad 5 (Brisbane), Brisbane, Australia, comprising the M5 Centenary Freeway and M5 Western Freeway

==== Europe ====
For Türkiye, see Asia

- Bucharest Metro Line M5, a metro line in Bucharest, Romania
- Highway M05 (Ukraine), a road connecting Kyiv and Odesa
- M5 (Copenhagen Metro), a future line of the Copenhagen Metro
- M5 highway (Belarus) (European route E271)
- M5 highway (Russia), another name for the Ural Highway in Russia
- M5 motorway (Hungary)
- M5 motorway (Northern Ireland)
- M5 motorway, England
- Metro Line M5 (Budapest Metro), a proposed metro line in Budapest, Hungary
- Line 5, Milan Metro of Milan Metro

=== Rail ===
- Sri Lanka Railways M5, diesel-electric locomotives

=== Sea ===
- M5, originally christened as Mirabella V, the world's largest single-masted yacht

== Media, fiction and entertainment ==
- M5 Industries, a visual effects company
- Maroon 5, an American pop rock band originating from Los Angeles
- "M5", a song from the album Middle Class Revolt by The Fall
- M5, the name for the production company of prolific session musician Marlo Henderson
- M-5 (Star Trek), a computer featured in an original Star Trek episode "The Ultimate Computer"

== Science and technology ==
- In amateur radio, a UK full-class license prefix
- CALM M5, a vehicular communications standard
- M5 fiber, a high-strength polymer used in composites
- M5 ISO metric screw thread
- M5, a diode part number of one of the 1N400x rectifier diodes
- M5, a full system computer architecture simulator for use in computer system design research
- M5, a variety of Zircaloy, a zirconium–niobium alloy used in nuclear reactors
- Messier 5 (M5), a globular cluster in the constellation Serpens
- Muscarinic acetylcholine receptor M5

=== Branding ===
- Apple M5, a central processing unit in the Apple M series
- Intel m5, a brand of microprocessors
- M5 Networks, a voice-over-IP company acquired by ShoreTel in 2012
- Panasonic M5, a VHS-recording camcorder marketed in the 1980s
- Sony Xperia M5, a mobile phone
- Sord M5, a Japanese home computer marketed in the 1980s

== Other ==
- Coca-Cola M5, a line of five collectible aluminum bottles
- Moscow 5, a multi-squad esports team.
- MLBB M5 World Championship, the fifth Mobile Legends: Bang Bang World Championship held in 2023
- M05, 1. FSV Mainz 05 soccer club
- ATC code M05 drugs
- M05, a military camouflage pattern
- Migration 5
- M5, a difficulty grade in mixed climbing

== See also ==
- 5M (disambiguation)
- M1905 (disambiguation)
