= Haima Familia M5 =

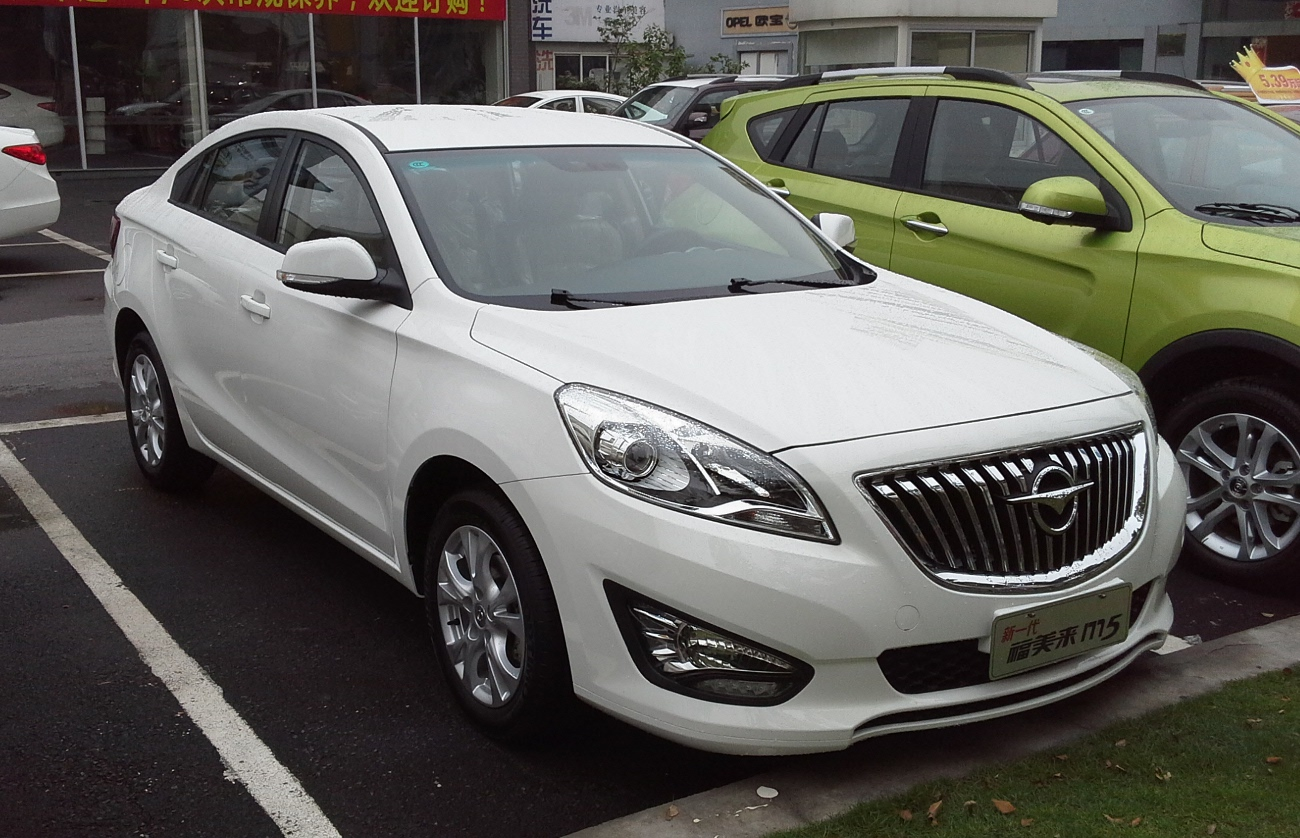

Overview
- Manufacturer: Haima Automobile
- Also called: Haima Family; Haima M5; Haima F5 (2018–2019)
- Production: 2014–2019
- Model years: 2015–2019
- Assembly: China: Hainan

Body and chassis
- Class: Mid-size car (D)
- Body style: 4-door sedan

Powertrain
- Engine: 1.5 L HM474Q-T turbo I4; 1.6 L HM474Q-C I4
- Transmission: 6-speed manual; 6-speed automatic

Dimensions
- Wheelbase: 2,685 mm (105.7 in)
- Length: 4,698 mm (185.0 in)
- Width: 1,806 mm (71.1 in)
- Height: 1,477 mm (58.1 in)

Chronology
- Predecessor: Haima Family; Haima 3

The Haima Familia M5 is a mid-size sedan produced in China from 2014 (for the 2015 model year) to 2019 under the Familia (福美来) product series within the Haima brand and sold alongside the similarly sized Haima M6.

== Overview ==
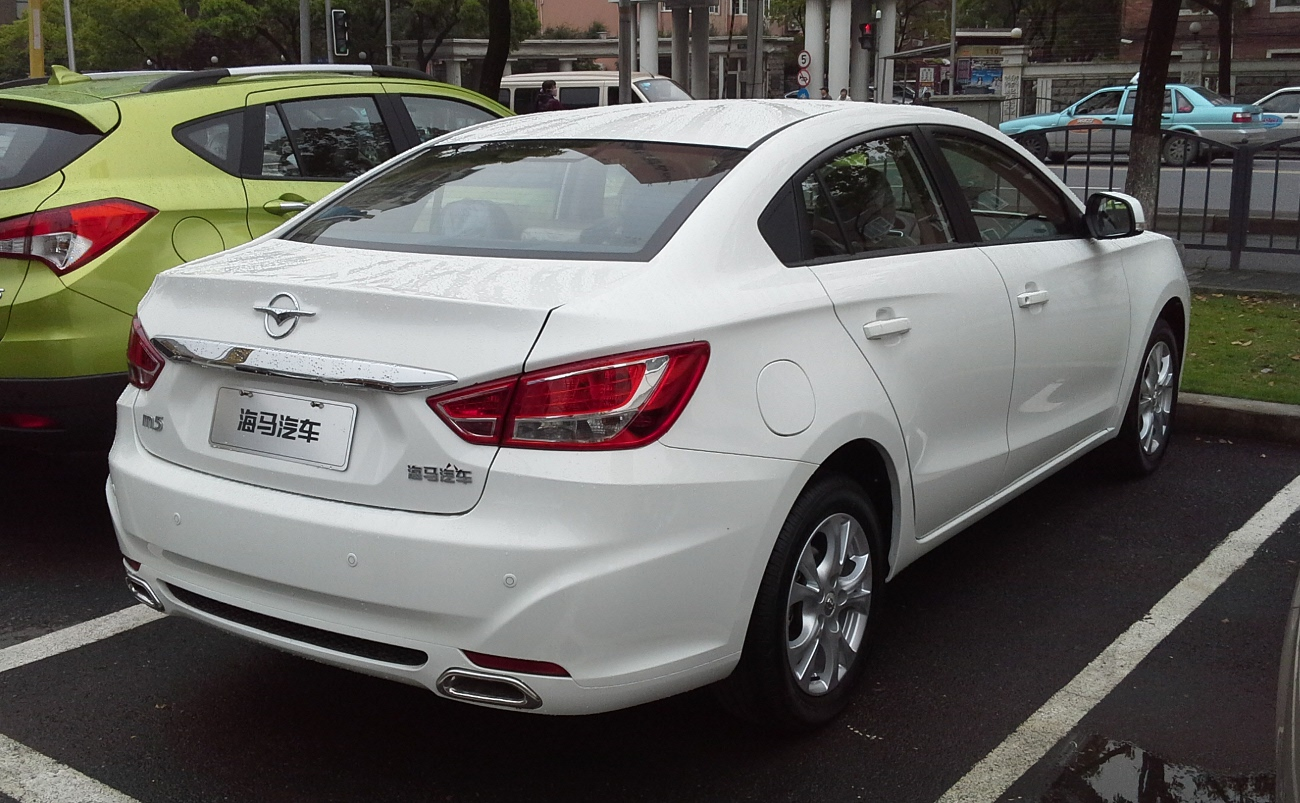
Rear view

Originally launched as the third generation Haima Family sedan, the model was later renamed to Haima Familia M5, replacing the Haima 3 or Haima Family compact cars.

Debuting in late 2013 and officially launched in May 2014, the price range of the Haima Familia M5 ranges from 74,900 yuan to 118,900 yuan.

=== 2017 facelift ===
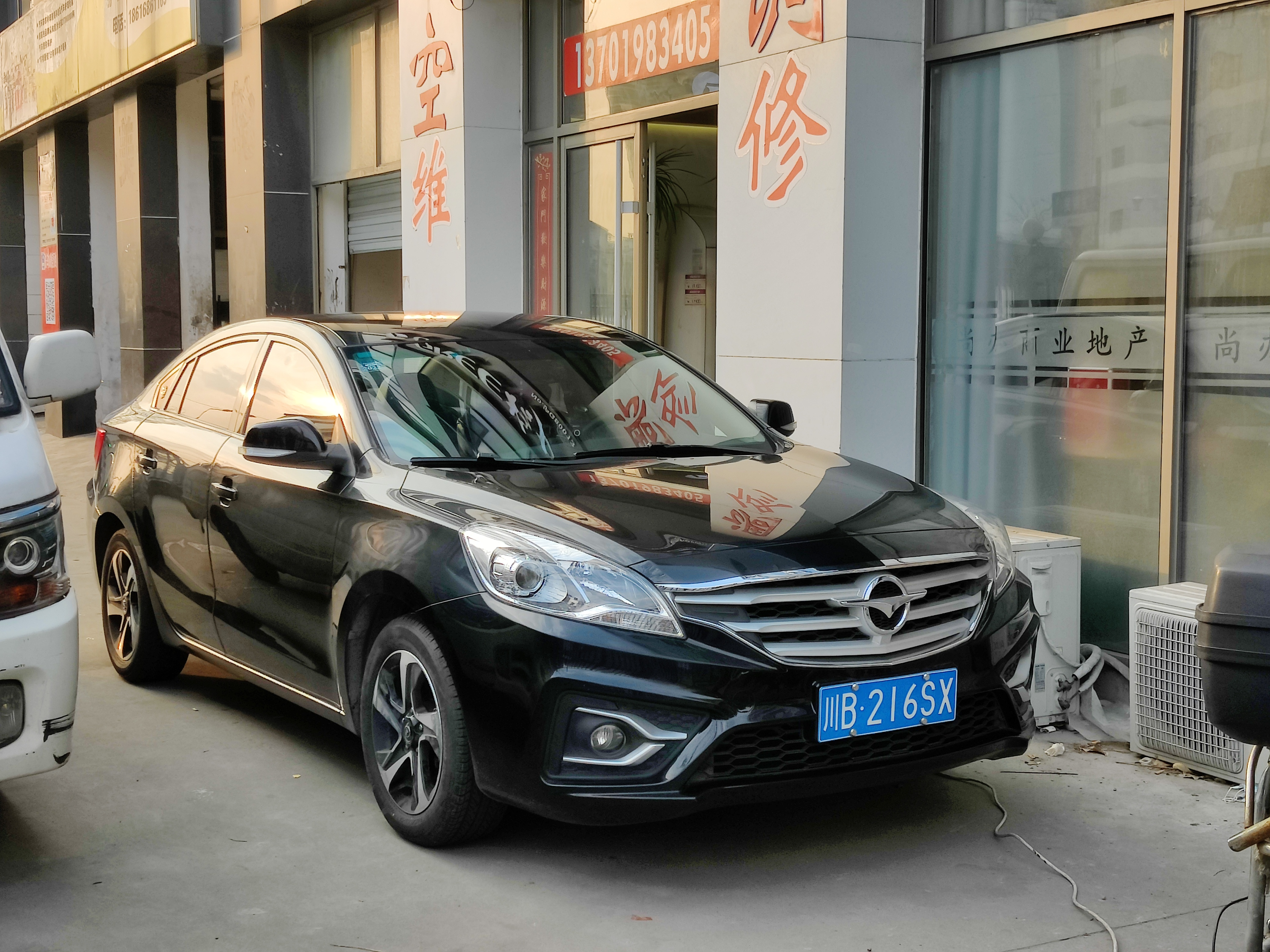
Haima Familia M5 2017 (facelift)

The Haima M5 received a facelift in September 2016 for the 2017 model year changing mainly the front and rear bumpers and front grilles along with interior multimedia infotainment system updates. For 2018, a third facelift of a car has currently been sold as the Haima Familia F5.

== Powertrain ==
The Haima M5 is available with two then-new engines including a 1.6-litre engine with 125hp and 151nm, and a 1.5-litre turbo engine with 160hp and 210nm. The 1.6-litre engine is mated to a 6-speed manual transmission or a 6-speed automatic transmission, while the 1.5-litre turbo engine is only available with the 6-speed automatic transmission.
