= Haima 3 =

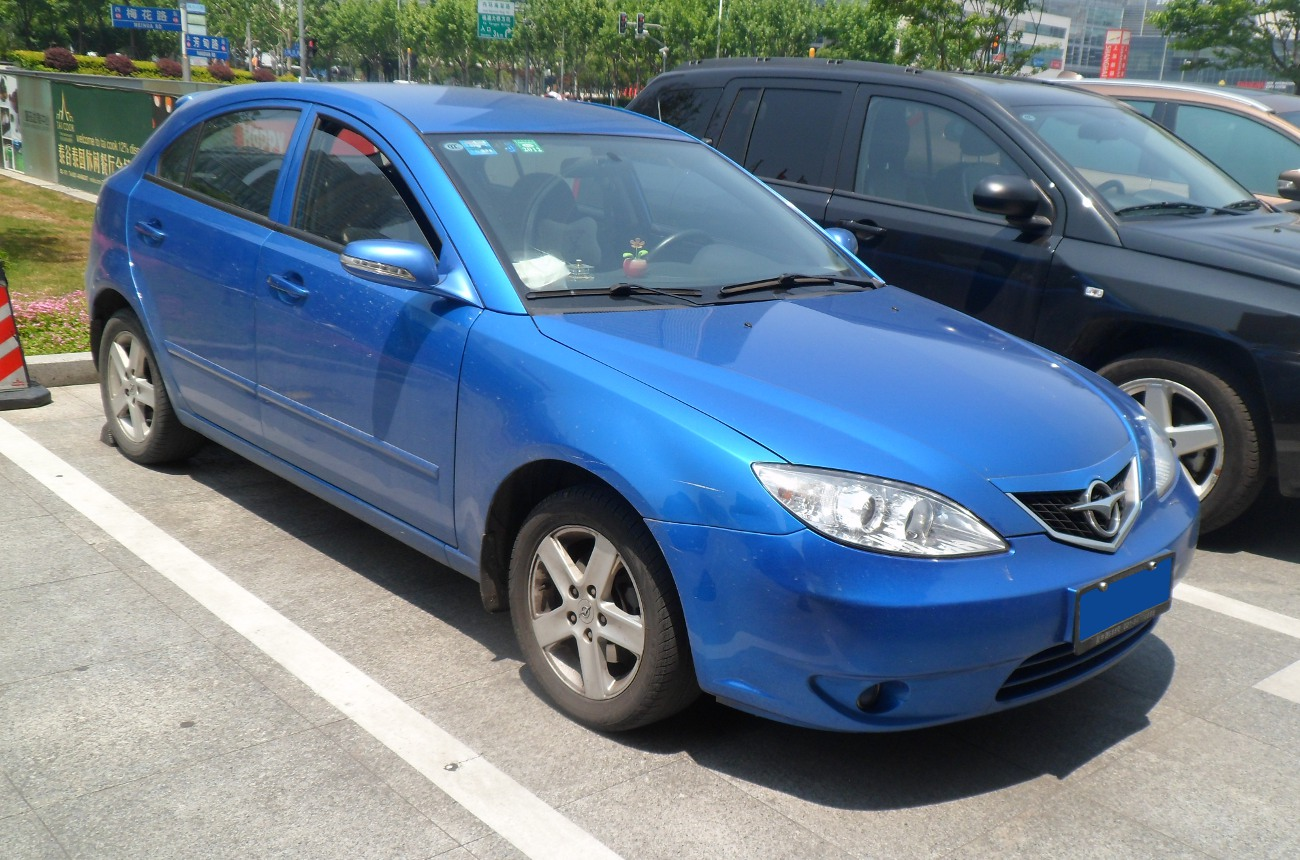

Overview
- Manufacturer: Haima Automobile
- Also called: Haima Family
- Production: 2007–2013
- Model years: 2007–2014
- Assembly: China: Hainan

Body and chassis
- Class: Compact car (C)
- Body style: 4-door sedan 5-door hatchback
- Platform: Mazda BJ platform
- Related: Mazda 323 (BJ); Hafei Saibao III; Hafei Saibao V

Powertrain
- Engine: 1.6 L HA-VVT-1.6 I4; 1.8 L HM483Q I4
- Transmission: 5-speed manual CVT

Chronology
- Predecessor: Haima Family
- Successor: Haima Familia M5

The Haima 3 is a compact car produced in China from 2007 to 2013 under the Haima brand, a joint venture between the Hainan provincial government and Mazda.

== Overview ==
The Haima 3 was based on the same platform as the ninth generation Mazda Familia/323 with a completely restyled body heavily inspired by the mechanically unrelated Mazda3. A 1.6 and 1.8-litre engine was available paired to a 5 speed manual or CVT gearbox. The Haima 3 replaced the Haima Family sedan, which is a rebadged Mazda 323 produced by Haima. However, the facelift model in 2011 was renamed back to Haima Family with prices ranging from 79,800 yuan to 84,800 yuan.

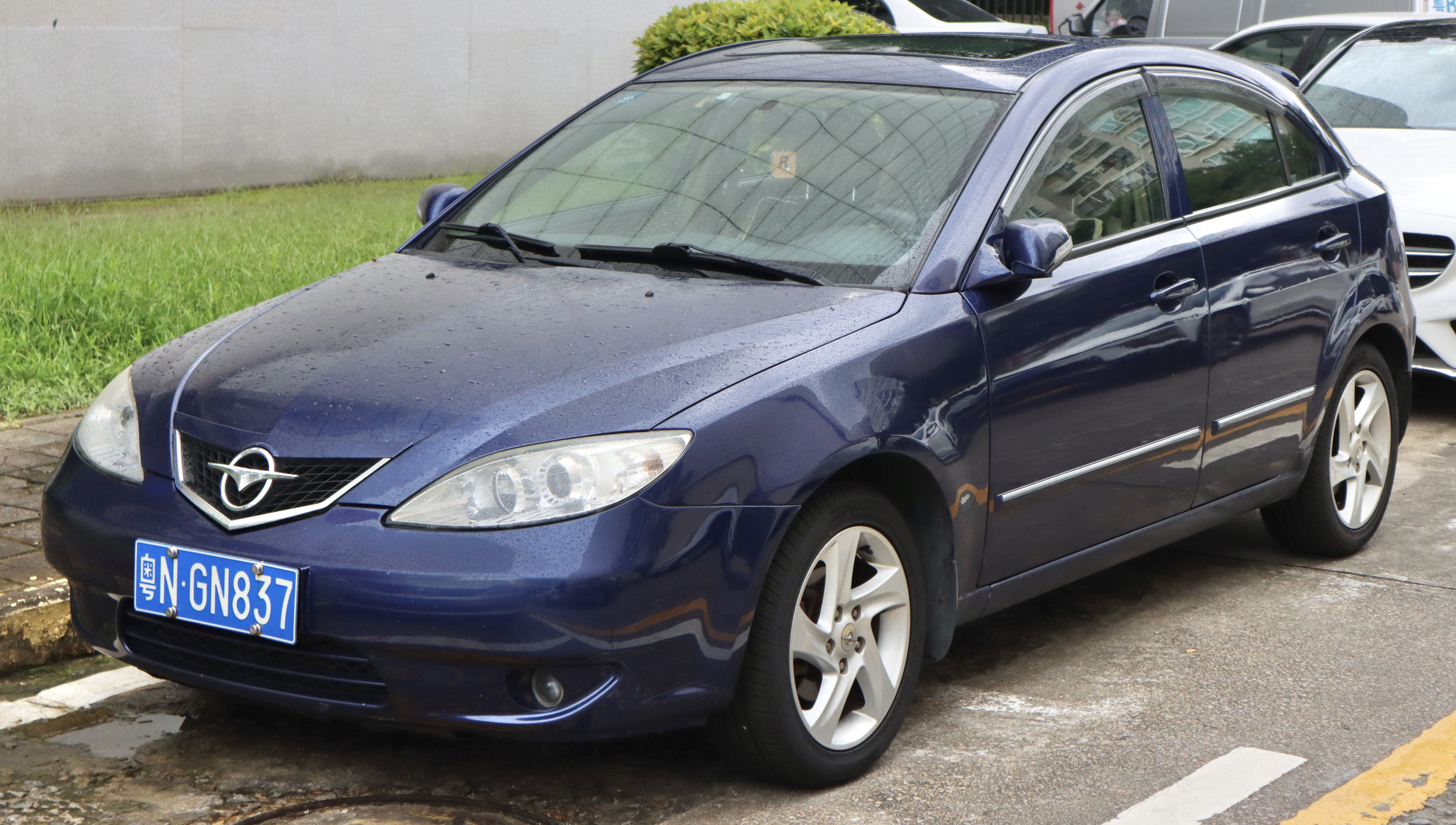
Haima 3 hatchback

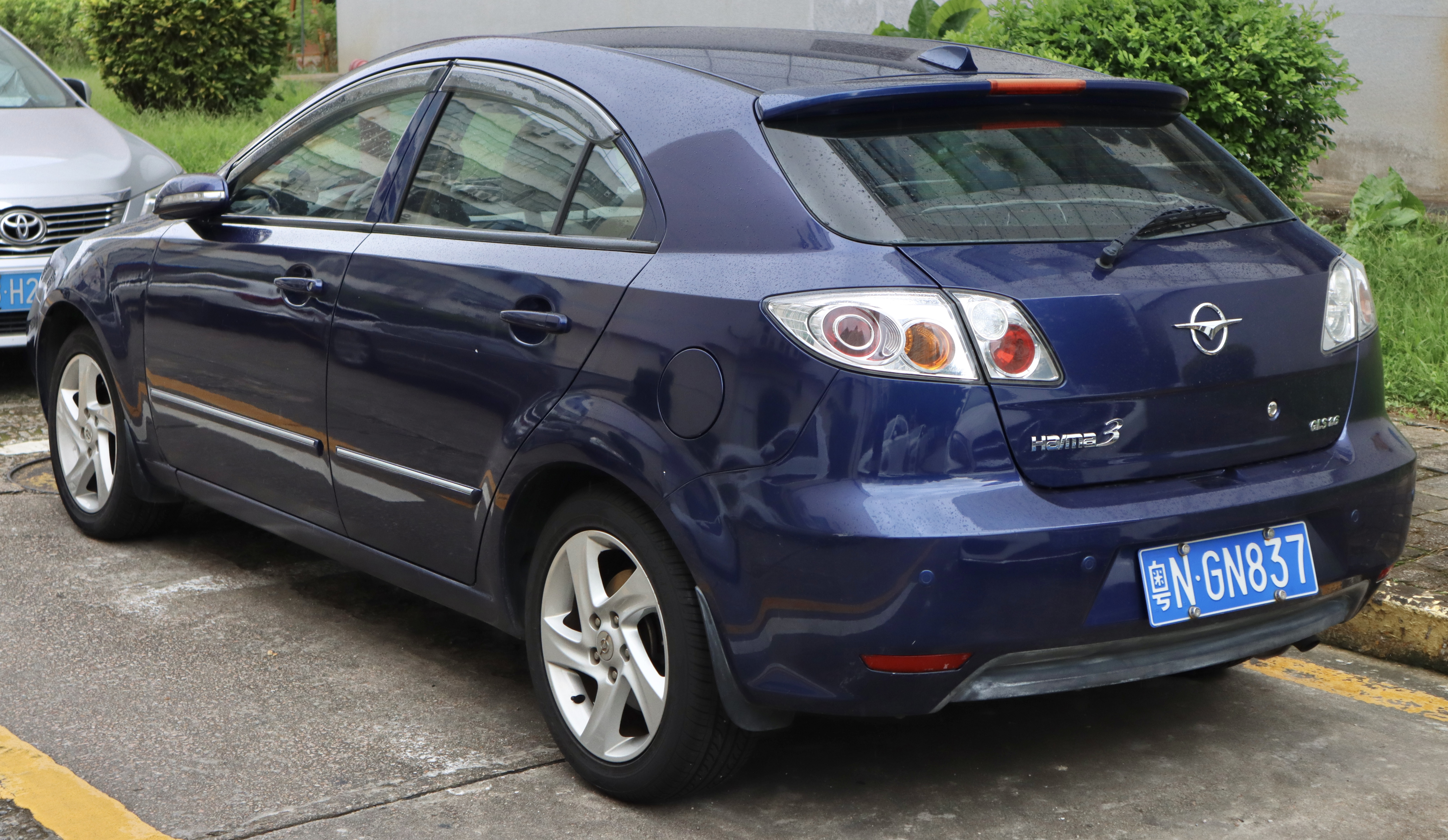
Rear view
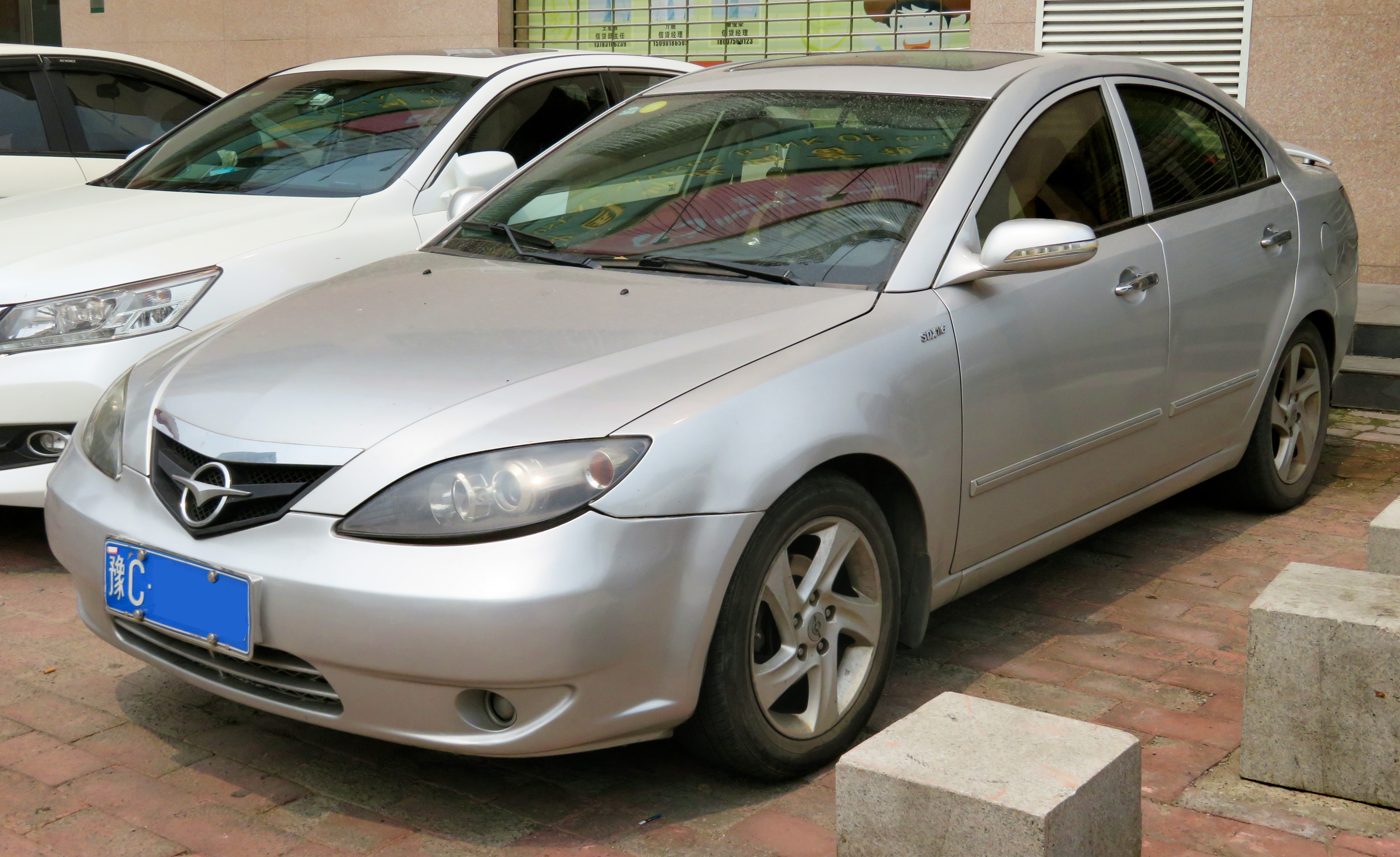
Haima 3 sedan

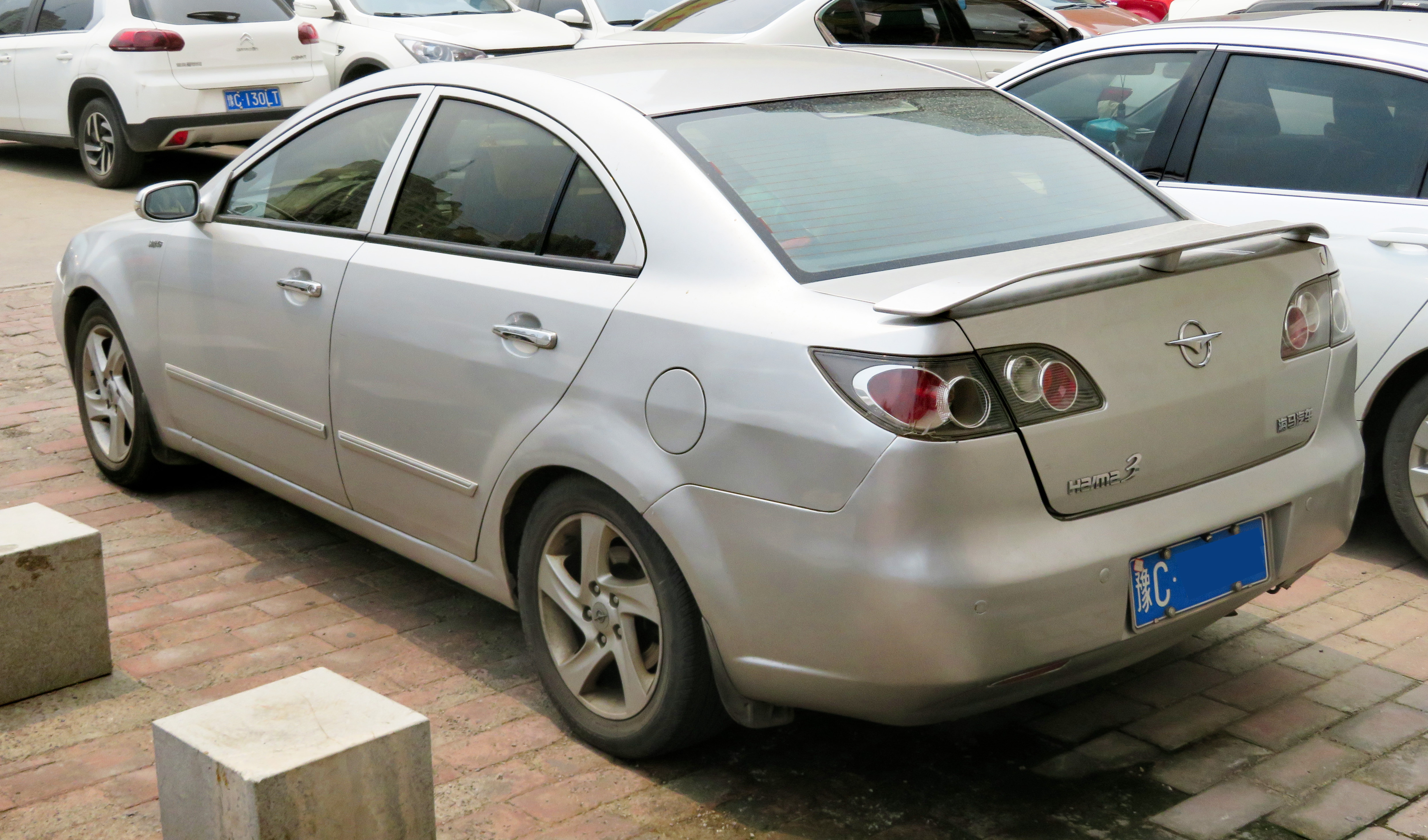
Rear view
