= Haima M6 =

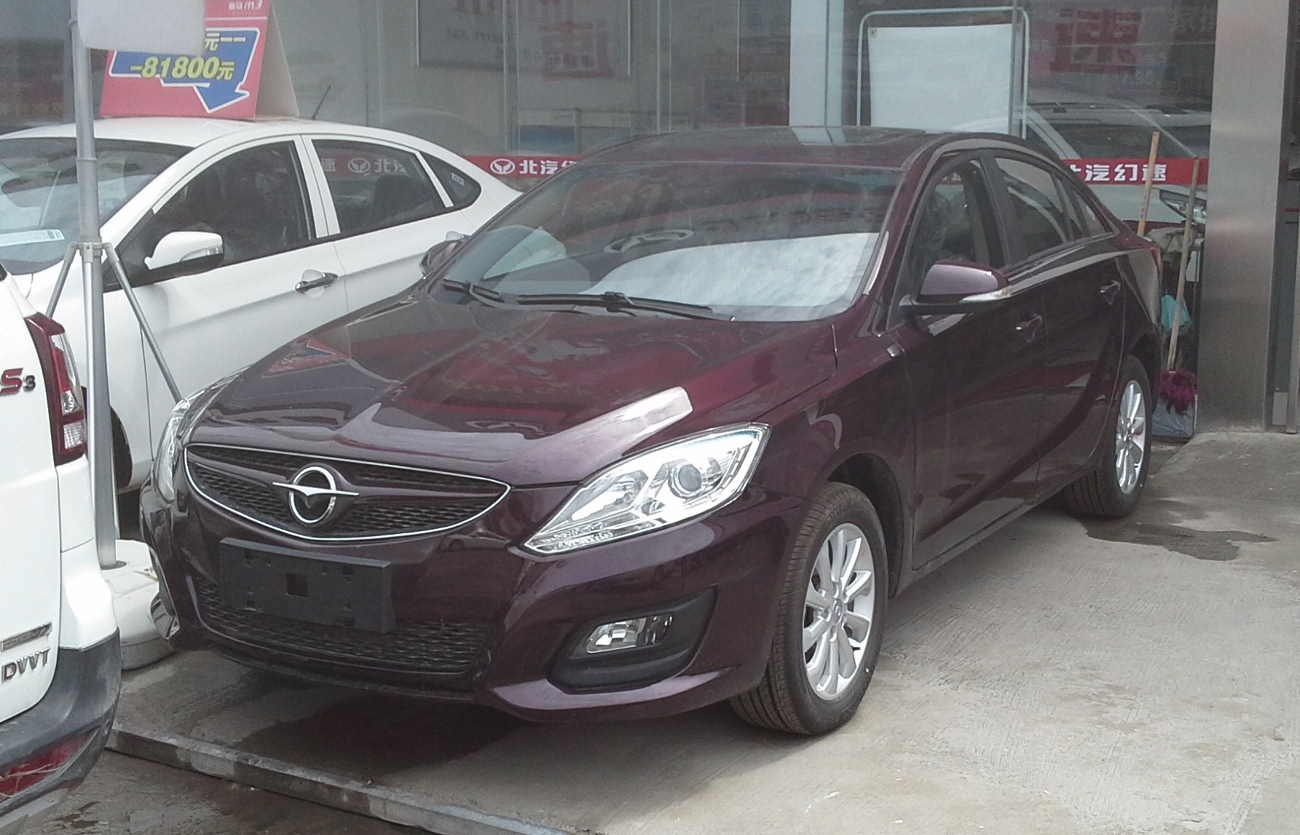
- Haima M6

Overview
- Production: 2013–2017
- Model years: 2015–2017

Body and chassis
- Class: Mid-size car (D)
- Body style: 4-door sedan

Powertrain
- Engine: 1.5 L HMA GN15-TF turbo I4; 1.6 L HMA GN16-VF I4
- Transmission: 5-speed manual CVT

Dimensions
- Wheelbase: 2,700 mm (106.3 in)
- Length: 4,700 mm (185.0 in)
- Width: 1,802 mm (70.9 in)
- Height: 1,478 mm (58.2 in)

The Haima M6 is a mid-size sedan produced in China from 2013 to 2017 under the Haima brand replacing the Haima 3 or Haima Family compact cars.

== Overview ==
The Haima M6 debuted on the 2013 Shanghai Auto Show in April 2013 as a pre-production model with the official market launch in April 2015. The Haima M6 front is suspected to be similar in design as the Opel Insignia A / Mk I(G09).

The Haima M6 is powered by the same engine unit as the Haima M5, which is 1.5-litre turbo inline-four engine producing 163 hp and 220 nm, mated to a six-speed manual transmission or a CVT.

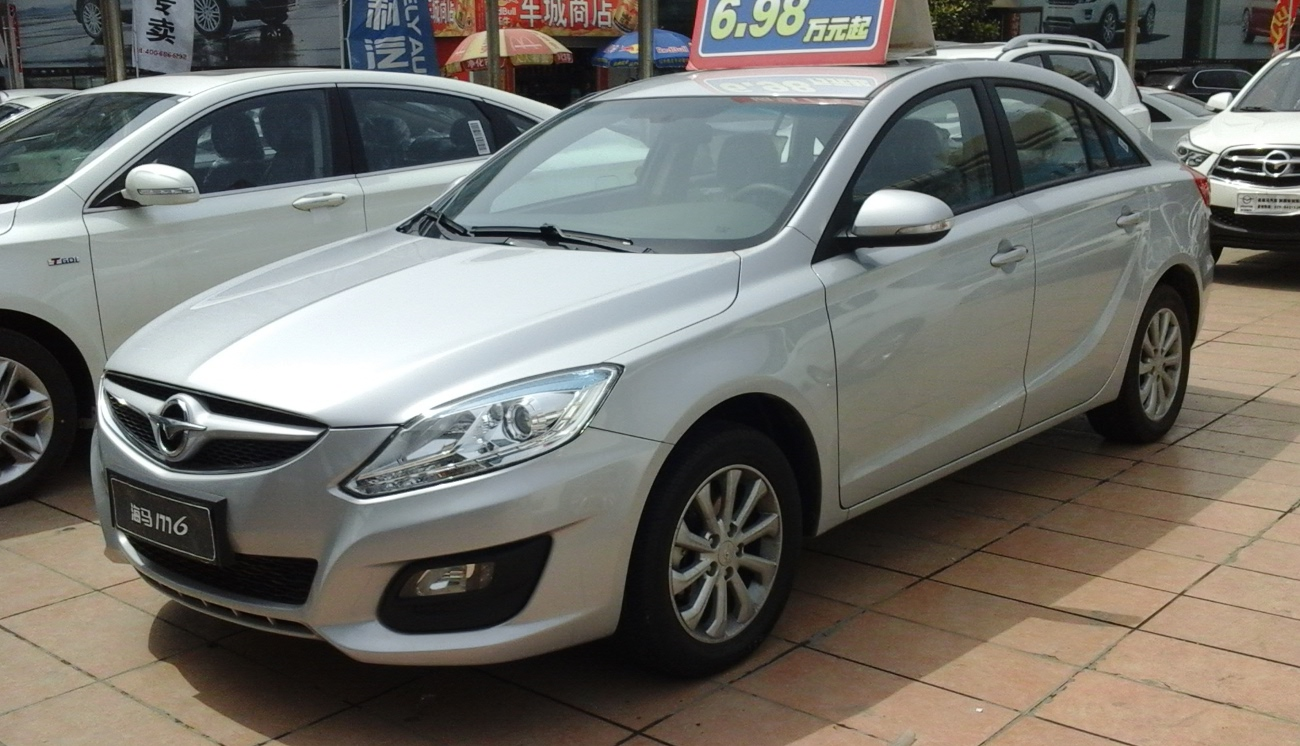
Pre-facelift Haima M6 sedan

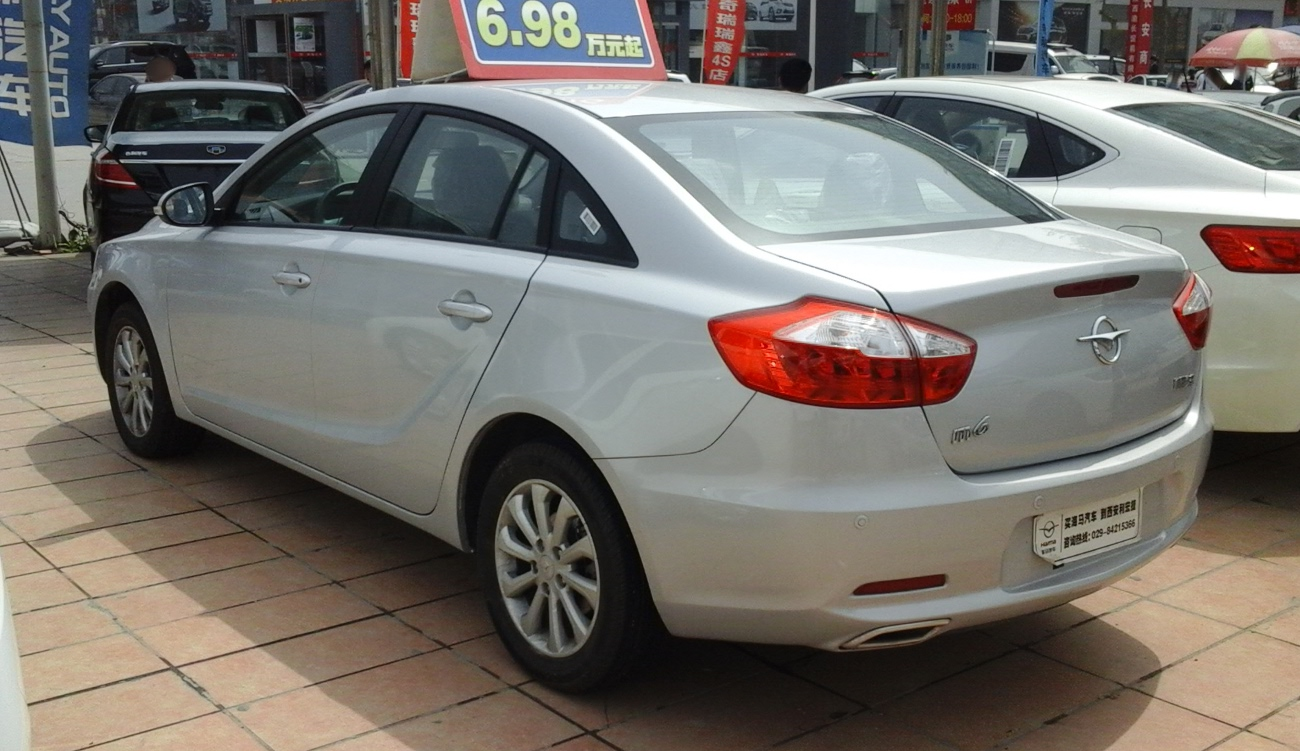
Pre-facelift Haima M6 sedan

=== 2016 facelift ===
A minor facelift was launched shortly after in 2016 with the pricing of the Haima M6 ranging from 69,800 yuan to 102,800 yuan.

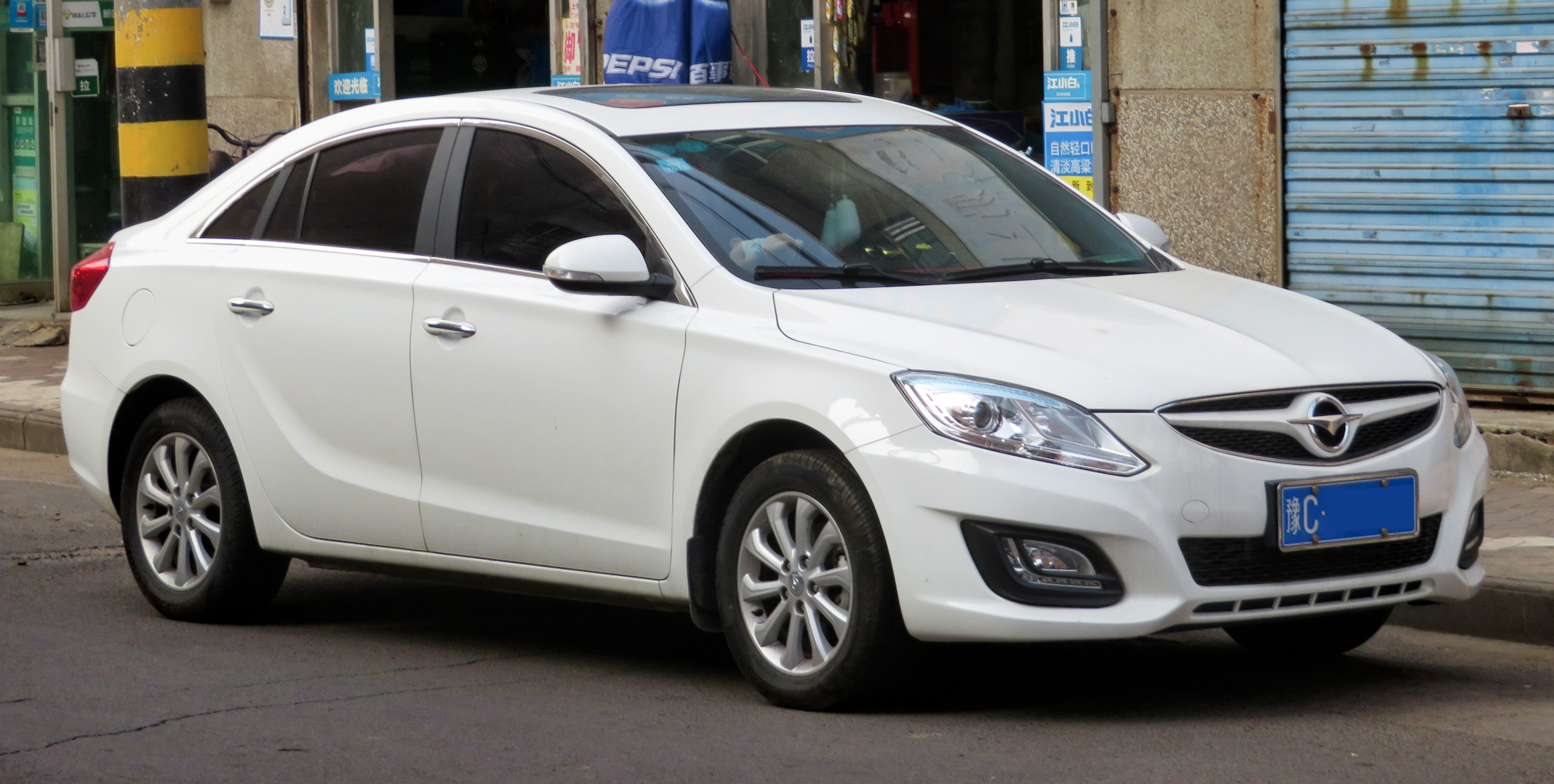
Post-facelift Haima M6 sedan

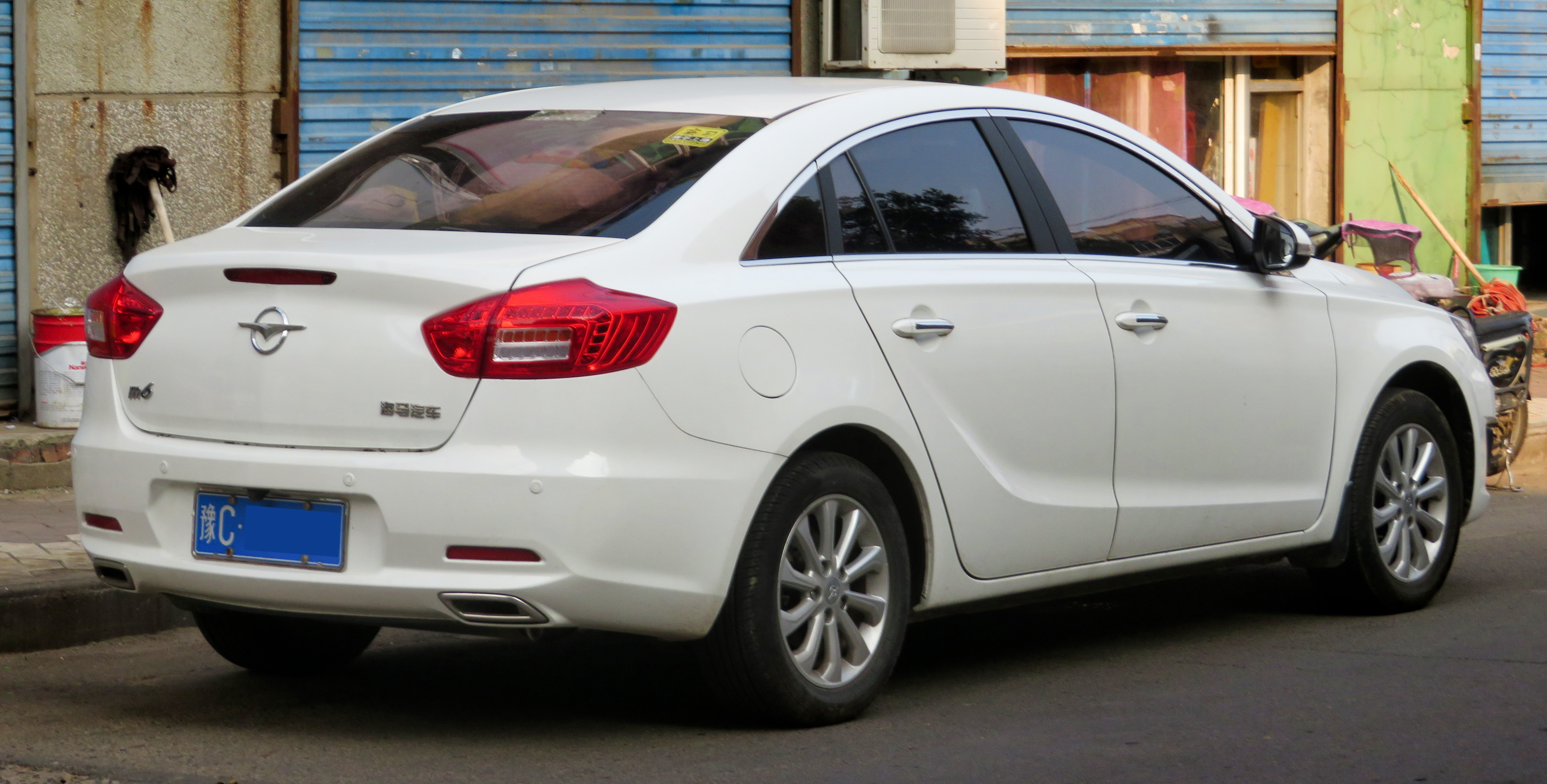
Post-facelift Haima M6 sedan
