= Coda (electric car) =

Four-door, four passenger electric car manufactured by Coda Automotive

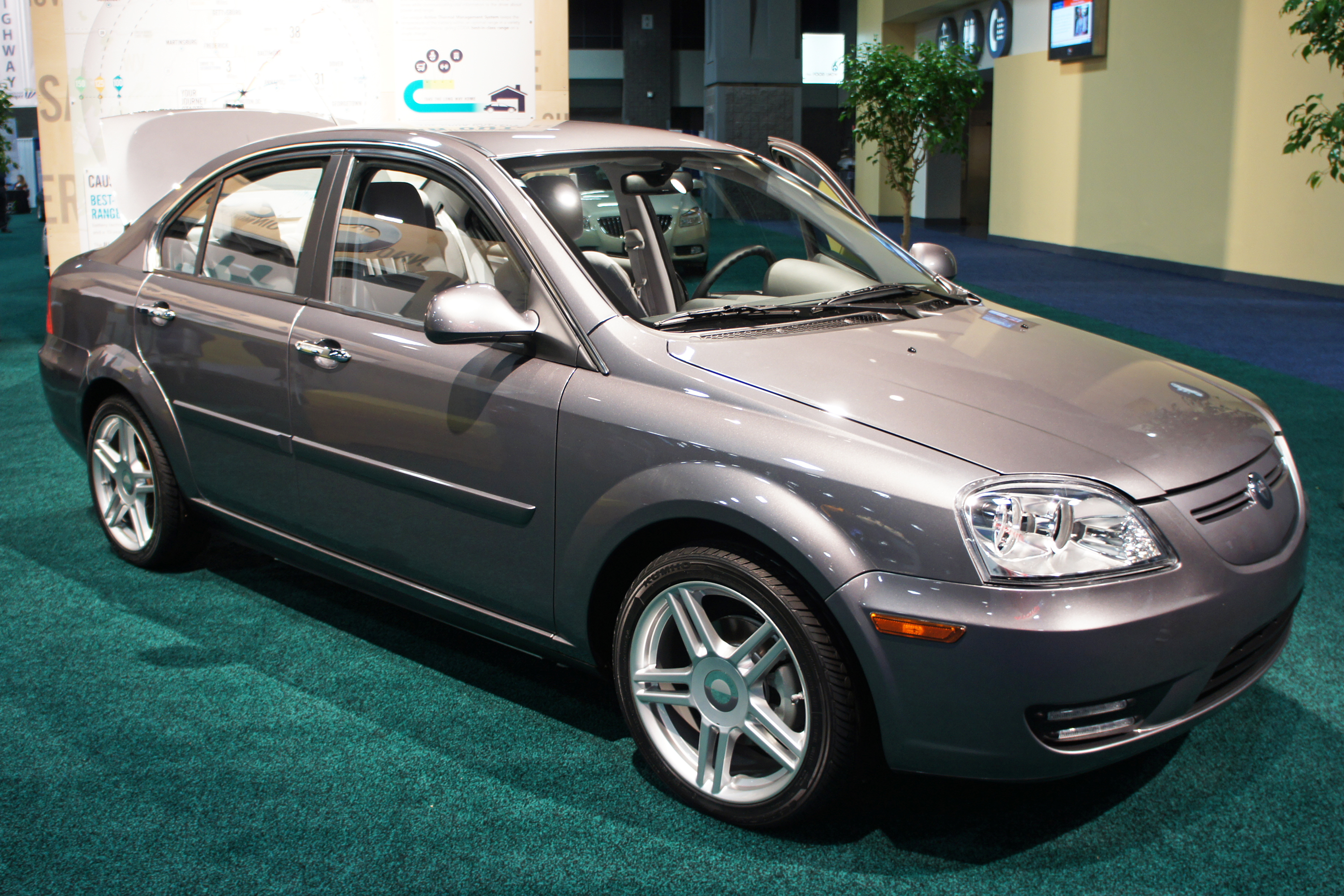

Overview
- Manufacturer: Coda Automotive
- Also called: Hafei Saibao III; Coda EV; Coda Sedan; Hafei Saibao EV; Changan E30 EV; Miles XS 200; Mullen 700e
- Production: 2012–2013

Body and chassis
- Body style: 4-door sedan
- Layout: Front-engine, front-wheel drive
- Related: Hafei Saibao; Mitsubishi Lancer

Powertrain
- Electric motor: 100 kW (130 hp), 300 N⋅m (220 ft⋅lb)
- Transmission: Single speed gear reduction
- Battery: 31 kW·h LiFePO_{4} battery
- Range: 88 mi (142 km) (EPA) up to 125 mi (201 km) (Coda)

Dimensions
- Length: 176.4 in (4,480.6 mm)
- Width: 67.2 in (1,706.9 mm)
- Height: 58.3 in (1,480.8 mm)
- Curb weight: 1,660 kg (3,670 lb)

The Coda is a four-door, four passenger electric car once manufactured by Coda Automotive. After being rescheduled several times, deliveries to retail customers in the United States began in March 2012. The car was sold exclusively in California and only 117 units were delivered by April 2013.

According to the US Environmental Protection Agency (EPA), the Coda's 31 kWh lithium iron phosphate (LiFePO_{4}) battery system delivers a range of 88 mi (142 km). EPA's rated the Coda's combined fuel economy at 73 miles per gallon gasoline equivalent (3.2 L/100 km).

The Coda adapted the body of the existing Hafei Saibao III, modifying the front and rear fascias. This variant is produced by Hafei and sold in China as the Saibao Electric Motor Car or Hafei Saibao EV.

== History ==
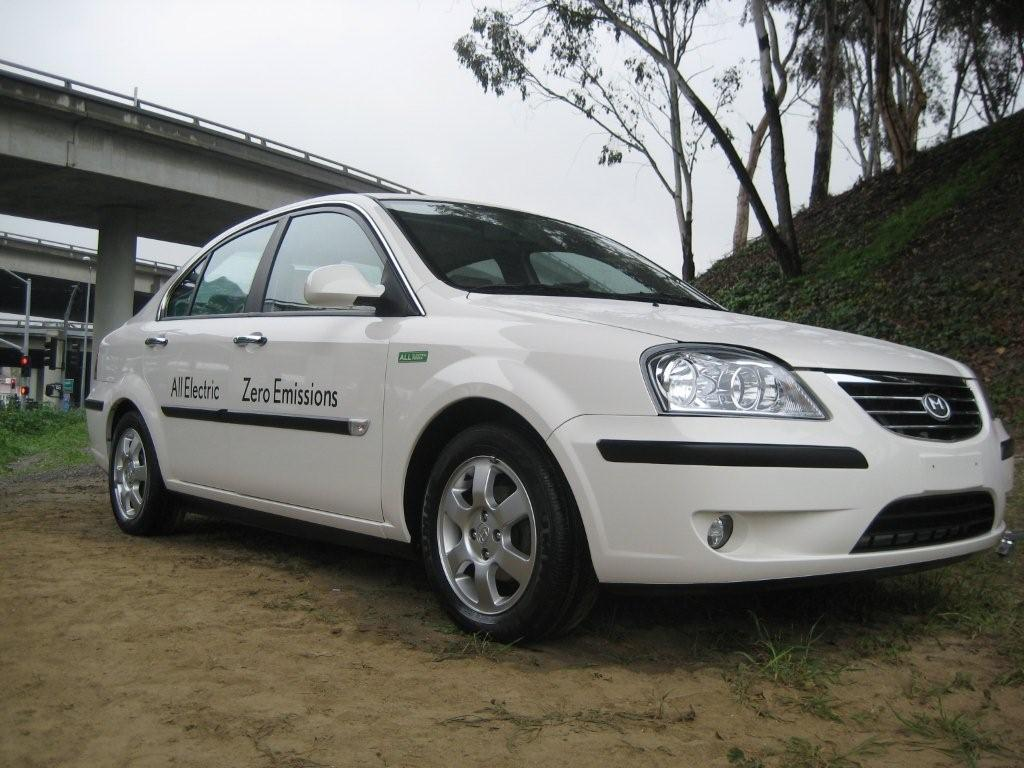
The Miles Electric Vehicles XS500 prototype, the predecessor to the Coda sedan.

Coda Automotive re-engineered an existing gasoline-powered vehicle, the Hafei Saibao, in order to reduce the cost of building the Coda electric car from the ground-up. The car was designed by Pininfarina and unveiled at the 2004 Beijing Auto Show. The base Saibao chassis is based on the late-1990s Mitsubishi Lancer. Coda engineers modified the design to improve safety and successfully completed two of the tests necessary to gain Federal Motor Vehicle Safety Standards certification in the second quarter of 2009; the full frontal impact test at 35 miles per hour (56 km/h) and the 40% offset test at 45 miles per hour (72 km/h). The Coda EV debuted in 2008, as the Miles XS 200, a car show prototype, by Coda parent company Miles Electric Vehicles.

Coda Automotive filed for Chapter 11 bankruptcy protection on 1 May 2013. The company stated that it expects to emerge from the bankruptcy process to focus on energy storage solutions as it has decided to abandon car manufacturing.

The remaining unsold Codas were bought up by electric car company Mullen Technologies, Inc., who sold them as the Mullen 700e until 2019.

== Specifications ==
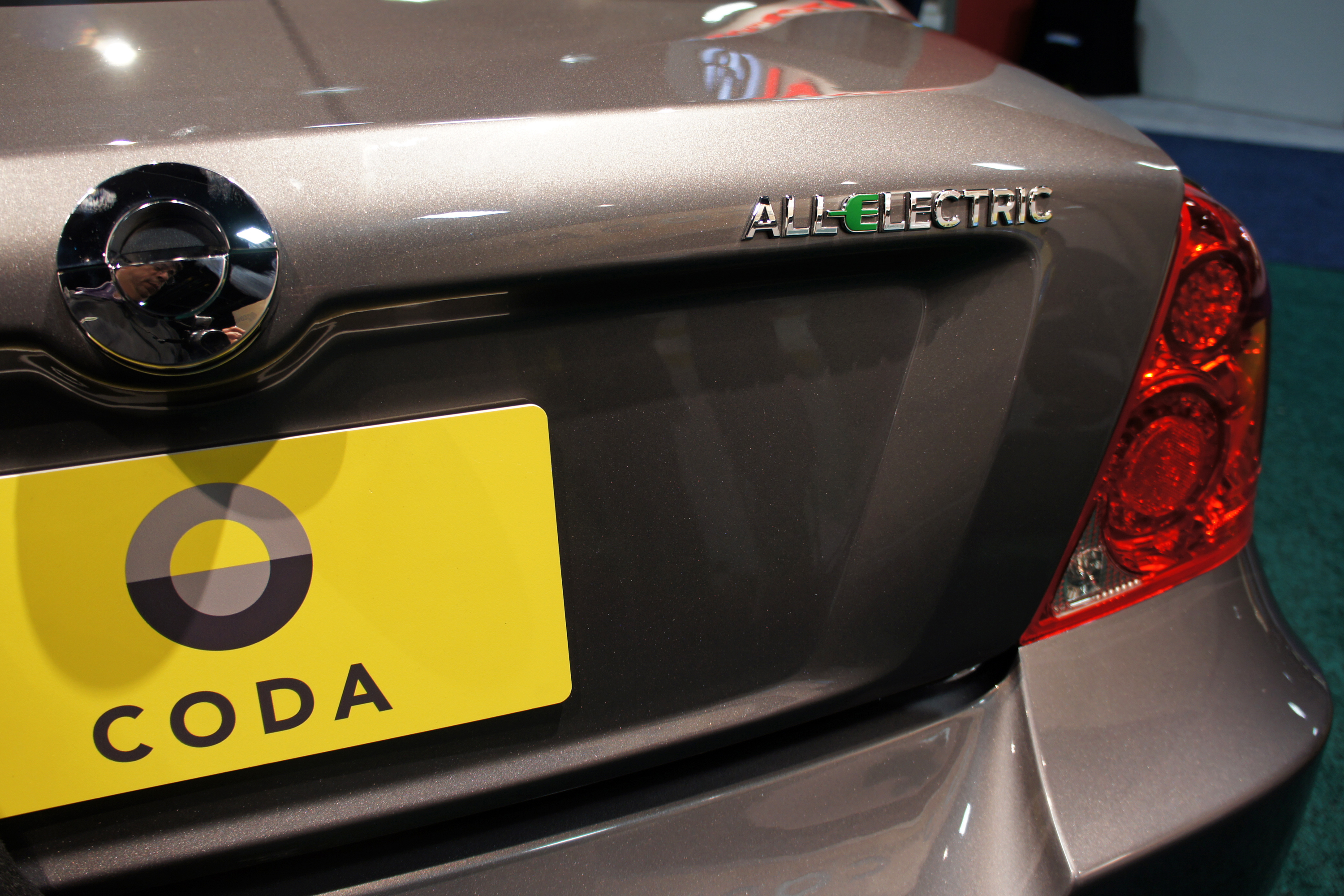
CODA electric car badging

The Coda basic model was powered by a 31 kWh LiFePO_{4} (lithium ion iron phosphate) battery system that is substantially larger than that of other vehicles in its class. Under its five-cycle testing, the EPA rated the combined fuel economy equivalent at 73 mpg‑e (29 kWh/100 km), with a combined city/highway energy consumption of 46 kWh/100 mi (73 mpg‑e), the most efficient among all electric cars available in the U.S. by early 2012. The equivalent fuel economy rating for city/highway driving cycles are 77 / 68 mpg‑e (27 / 31 kWh/100 km). EPA's official range is 88 mi (142 km). Coda Automotive estimated the range to be up to 125 mi (201 km) under favorable operating conditions. The Coda had a top speed of 85 mph (137 km/h) electronically limited.

The battery system featured an active thermal management system, which Coda Automotive stated would give the vehicle a more dependable range than other BEVs and improved battery system durability. The vehicle featured a 6.6 kW on board charger which charges the vehicle at a rate twice that of the Nissan Leaf and Chevrolet Volt. The Coda sedan could be charged from depletion in under six hours when plugged into a level-two (220 V) charge station. The company estimated that it would cost less than US$3, on average, to charge the vehicle overnight. The electric car had a 3-year, 36,000 mile limited warranty, the powertrain a 5-year, 60,000 mile limited warranty, and both battery pack options available had a 10-year, 100,000 mile limited warranty.

Safety features included anti-lock braking system, electronic stability control (ESC) with traction control, a 6-air bag system, pre-tensioner equipped seat belts, and a child restrain system. Standard non-safety features included a touch-screen CD player radio, eco-friendly cloth seats, and chrome door handles and side mirrors. Available features include black-finished alloy wheels, metallic paint colors, leather seats, and an upgraded premium sound system.

== Safety ==
2012 National Highway Traffic Safety Administration (NHTSA) crash test ratings:

- Frontal driver:
- Frontal passenger:
- Front side:
- Rear side:
- Rollover:

== Recalls ==
The NHTSA stated that Coda Automotive must replace both side curtain airbags in all of the 117 cars sold.

== Pricing and sales ==
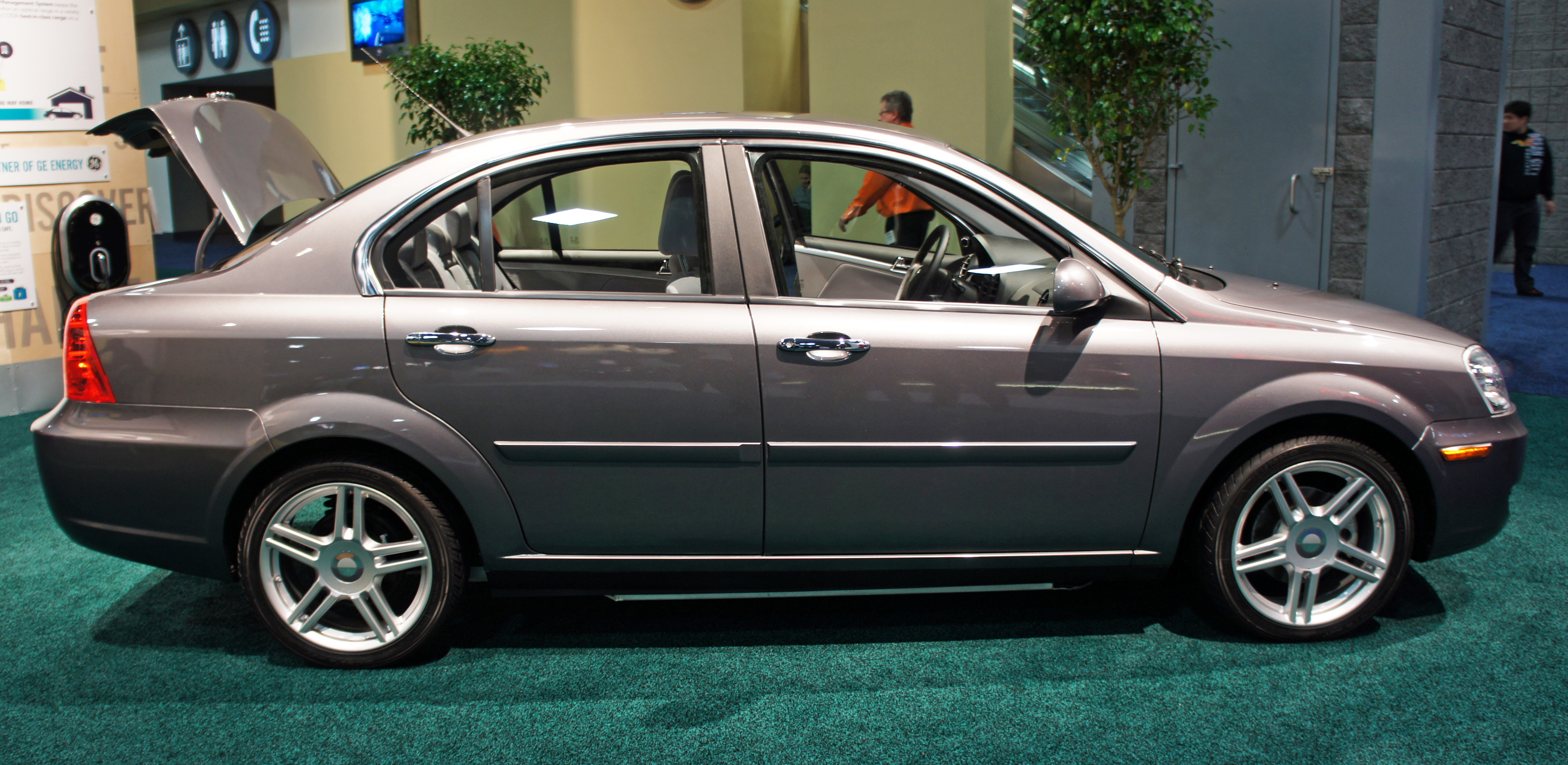
Coda electric car exhibited at the 2012 Washington Auto Show.

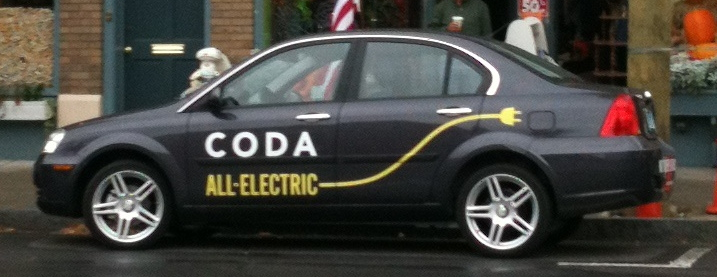
A Coda Electric Car parked in Old Greenwich, Connecticut

Initial deliveries of the vehicle were planned for December 2010 but were pushed back to the second half of 2011 as Coda Automotive decided to have more time available to ensure the quality of the car, and later were again rescheduled for late 2011. The latest market launch was slated for February 2012. The first production unit for retail sale came off the assembly line in March 2012, and the first deliveries to retail customers in the United States took place on March 19, 2012. The electric was available only in California, and sales were planned for Oregon and Florida in 2013, but they never took place.

The retail price of the 2012 Coda began at US$37,250 before any electric vehicle federal tax credit and other state and local incentives that are available in the U.S. The base model came with a 31 kWh battery (EPA rated combined range of 88 mi (142 km) per charge). Coda Automotive planned to offer an option with 35/36 kWh battery pack that was expected to deliver approximately 25 mi (40 km) of additional range, and priced at US$39,900. Production of the 35-kWh battery model was scheduled to begin by mid-2012, but it was never offered for sale. A total of 78 units of the initial run of vehicles were recalled for problems with air bag deployment, further dampening sales prospects.

When Coda Automotive filed for bankruptcy protection on May 1, 2013, 117 units had been delivered in California. In September 2013 the leftover stock was bought by two organizations, Club Auto Sales and Ready Remarketing. A total of 50 cars and 100 gliders were put for sale at a discounted price in the U.S. and abroad, as 11 of the 50 cars with the complete electric powertrain are not legal for use in the U.S. due to the larger size of their battery. The gliders sales price was US$7,500. In 2014, Mullen Motor Company (Mullen Technologies) released the Mullen 700e, a slightly revamped version of the Coda, created out of the remaining stock.

== See also ==
- Government incentives for plug-in electric vehicles
- List of electric cars currently available
- List of modern production plug-in electric vehicles
- List of production battery electric vehicles
- Plug-in electric vehicle
- Plug-in electric vehicles in the United States
- Zero-emissions vehicle
- Last Coda retail sale
