= Haima Family =

Chinese motor vehicle

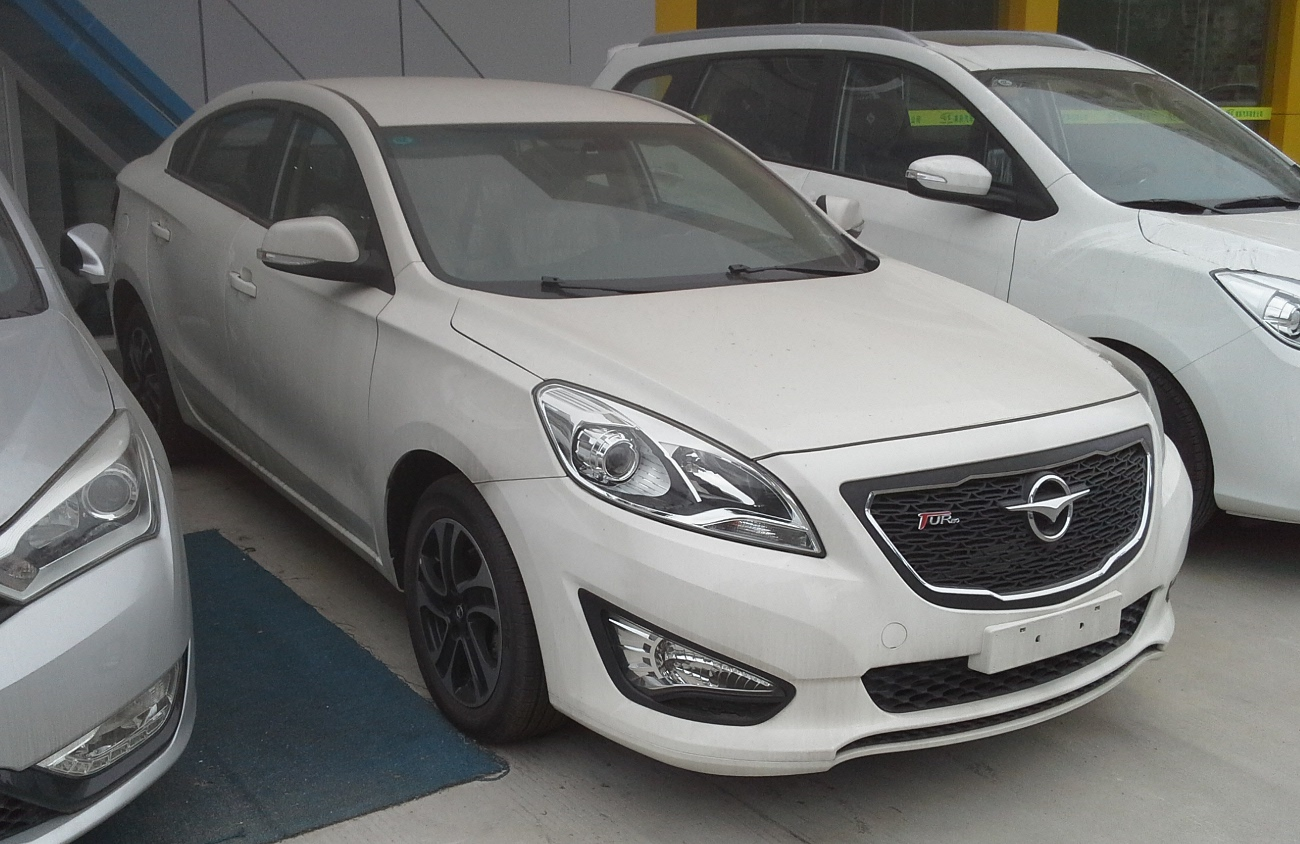

Overview
- Manufacturer: Haima Automobile
- Also called: Haima 3 (2007–2011)
- Production: 2003–2019
- Assembly: China: Hainan

Body and chassis
- Class: Compact car (C)
- Body style: 4-door sedan; 5-door hatchback (2007–2012)
- Layout: FF layout

Chronology
- Predecessor: Mazda 323 (China)
- Successor: Haima Familia M5; Haima M6

The Haima Family is a compact sedan and hatchback produced by the Chinese manufacturer Haima Automobile. The model was introduced in 2003.

== Haima Family I (2003–2010) ==
The first generation Haima Family was a badge engineered version of the eighth generation Mazda 323 with completely redesigned front and rear ends sold in China by Haima Automobile. Production went from 2003 to the 2010 model year.

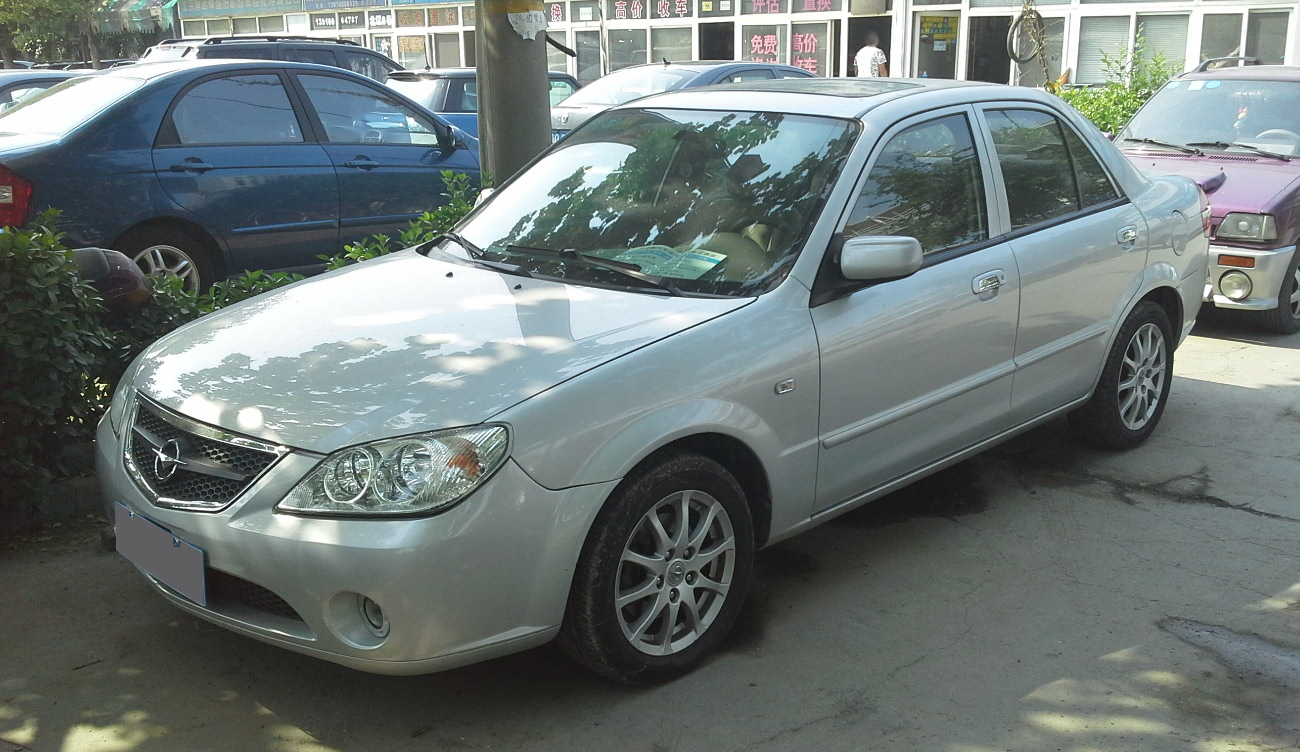
Haima Family I

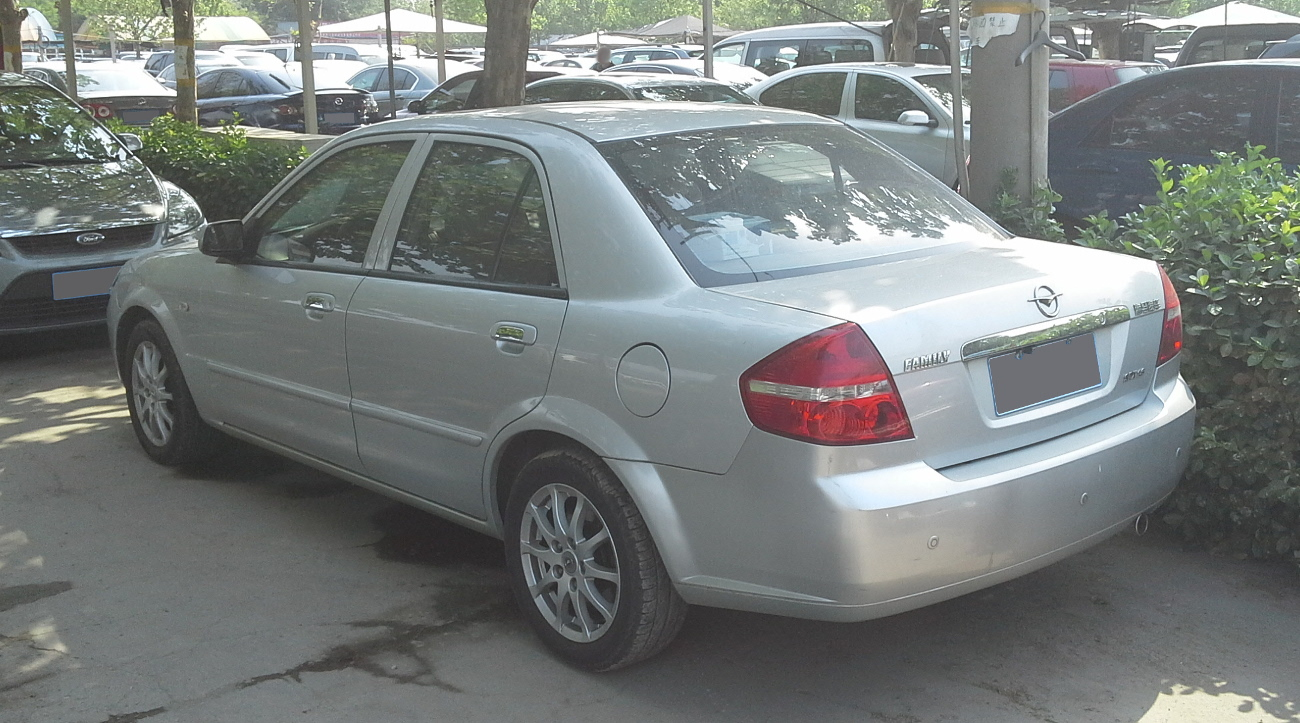
Rear view

== Haima Happin (2010–2012) ==
An identical model was also available at the same time originally rebadged as the Haima Happin (海福星, Haifuxing) wearing exactly the same front bumper as the Mazda 323 at launch, but later had a facelift that features redesigned front and rear bumpers and new lamps to differentiate from the Mazda design with prices ranging from 59,800 yuan to 66,800 yuan.

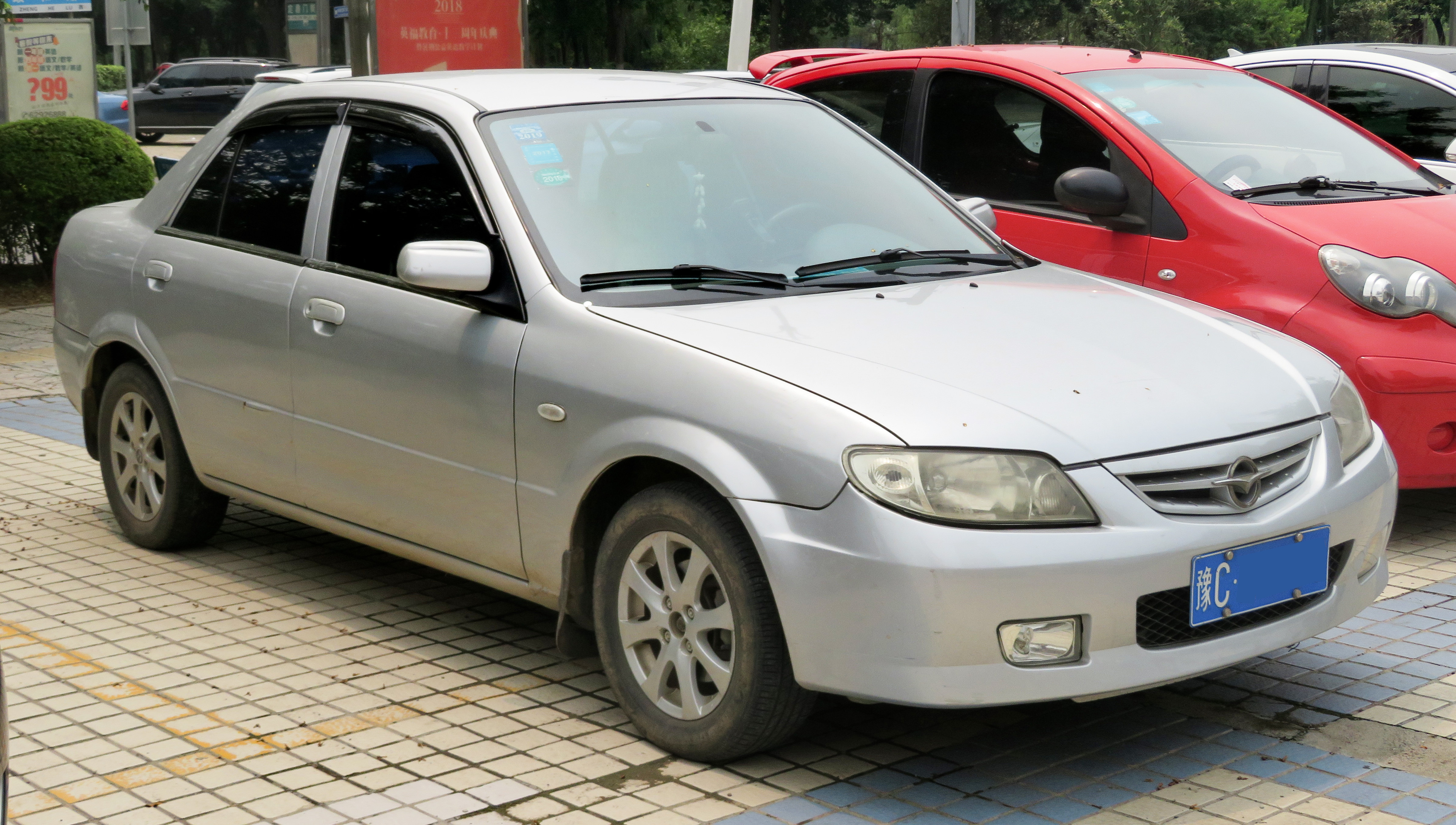
Haima Happin (pre-facelift)

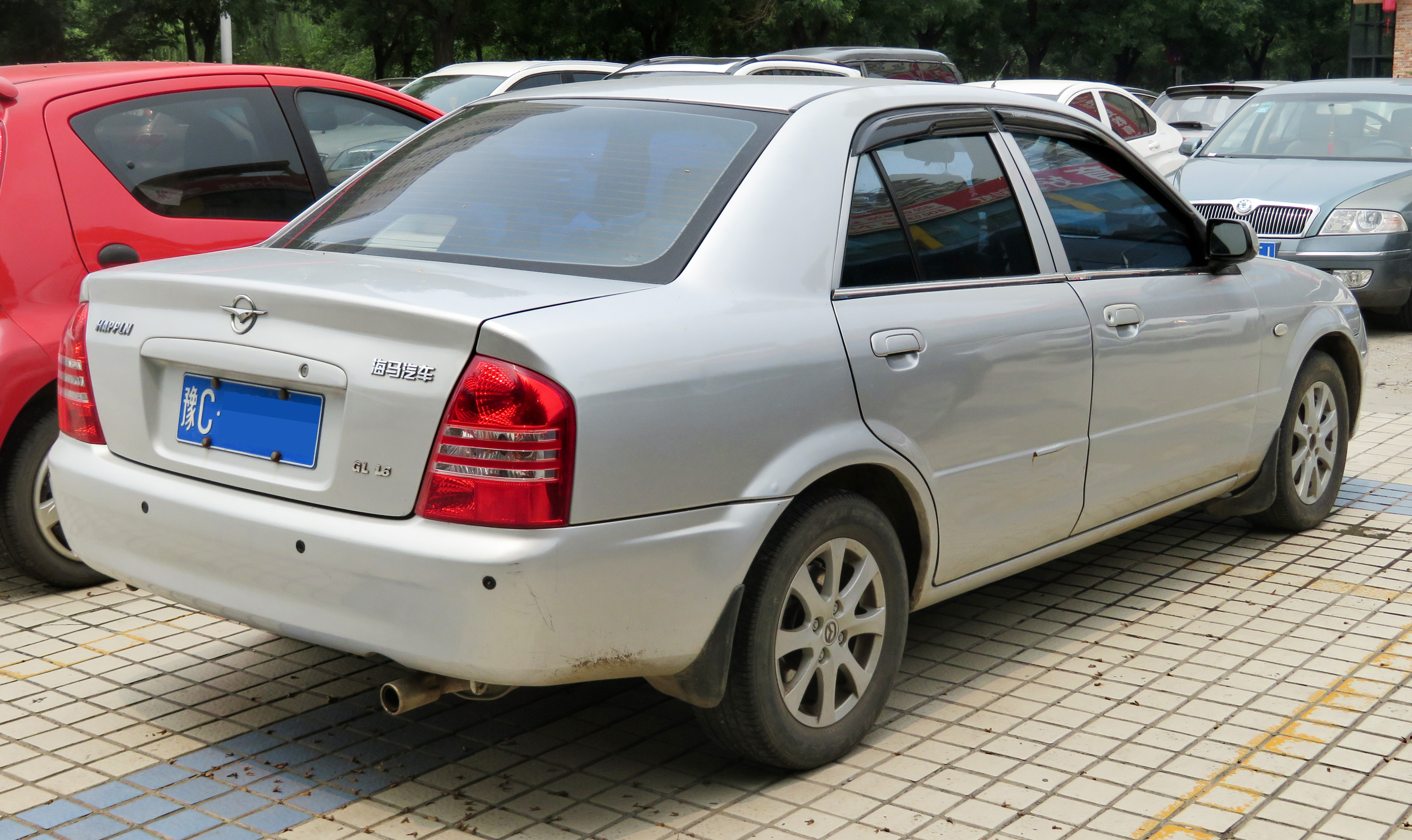
Rear view

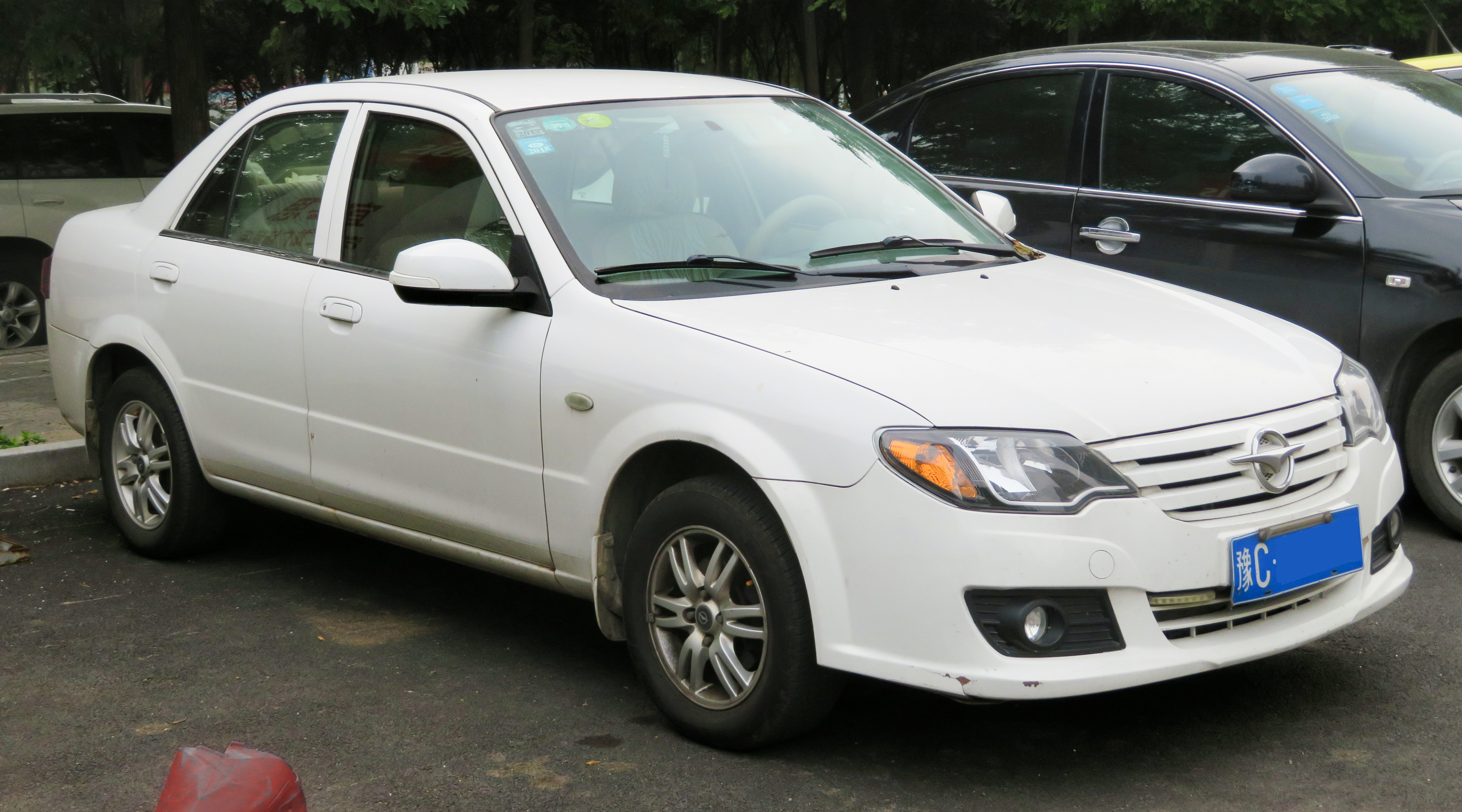
Haima Happin (facelift)

== Haima Family II (2007–2013) ==
The second generation Haima Family was originally launched as the Haima 3 based on the same platform as the ninth generation Mazda 323. However, the model was renamed to Haima Family after the 2011 facelift with prices starting from 76,800 yuan to 98,800 yuan.

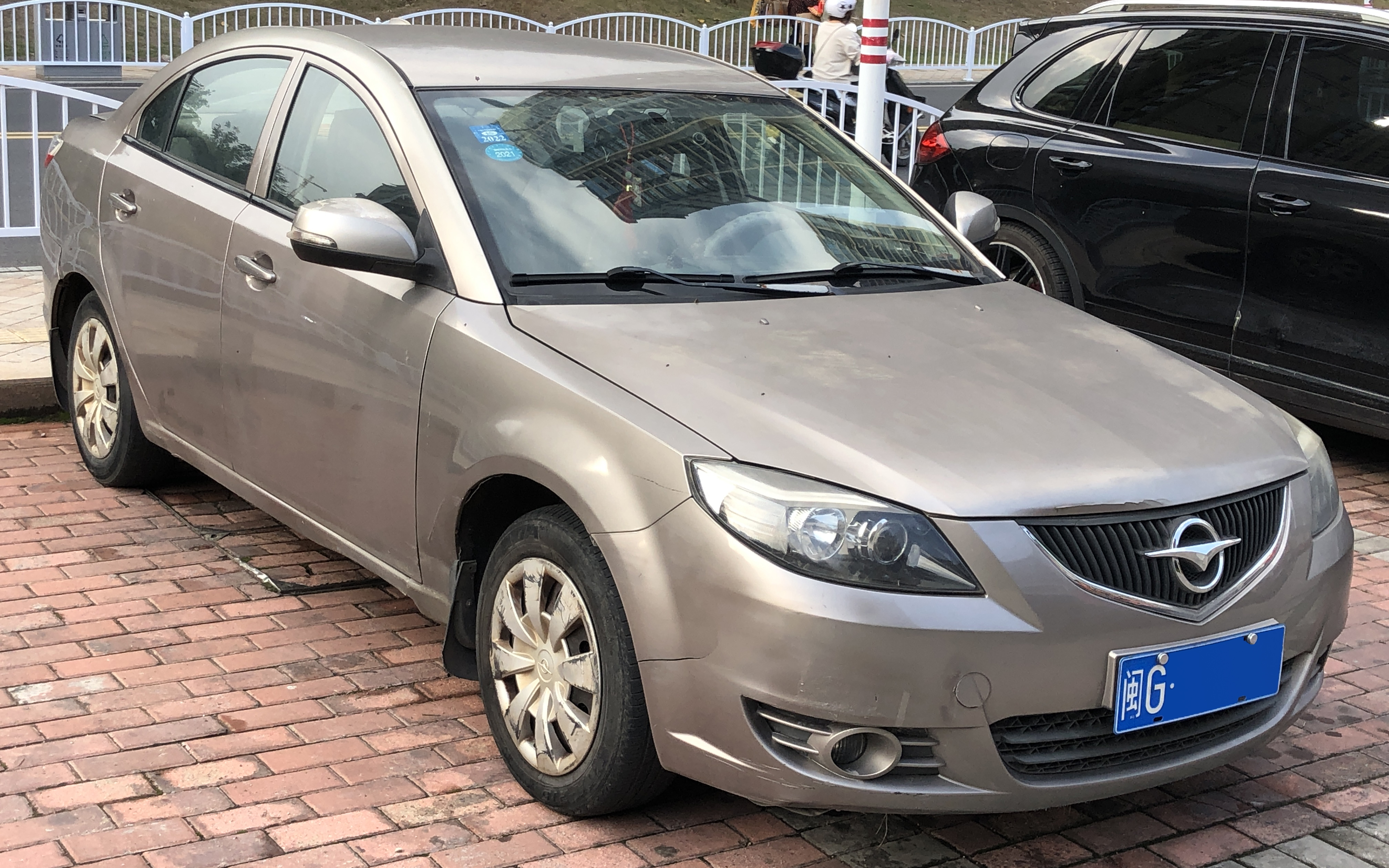
Haima Family II (pre-facelift)

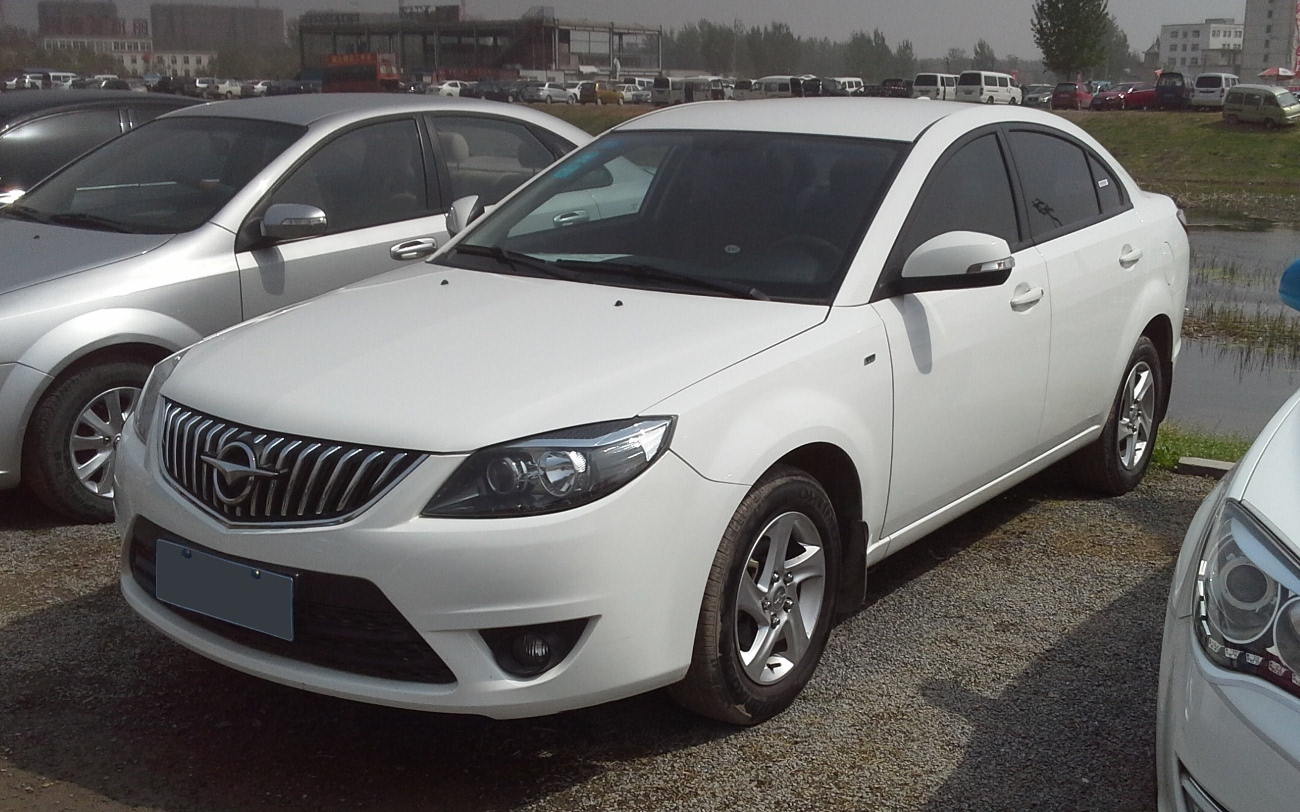
Haima Family II sedan (facelift)

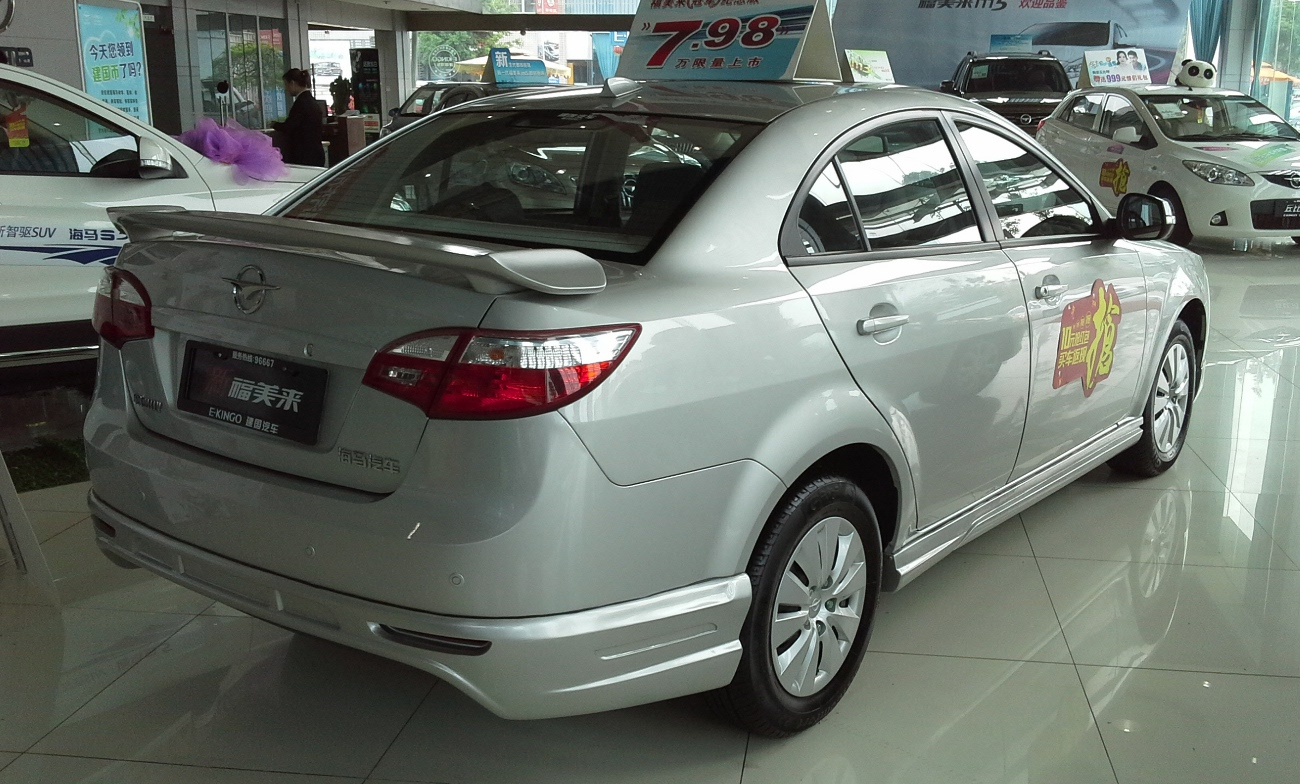
Rear view

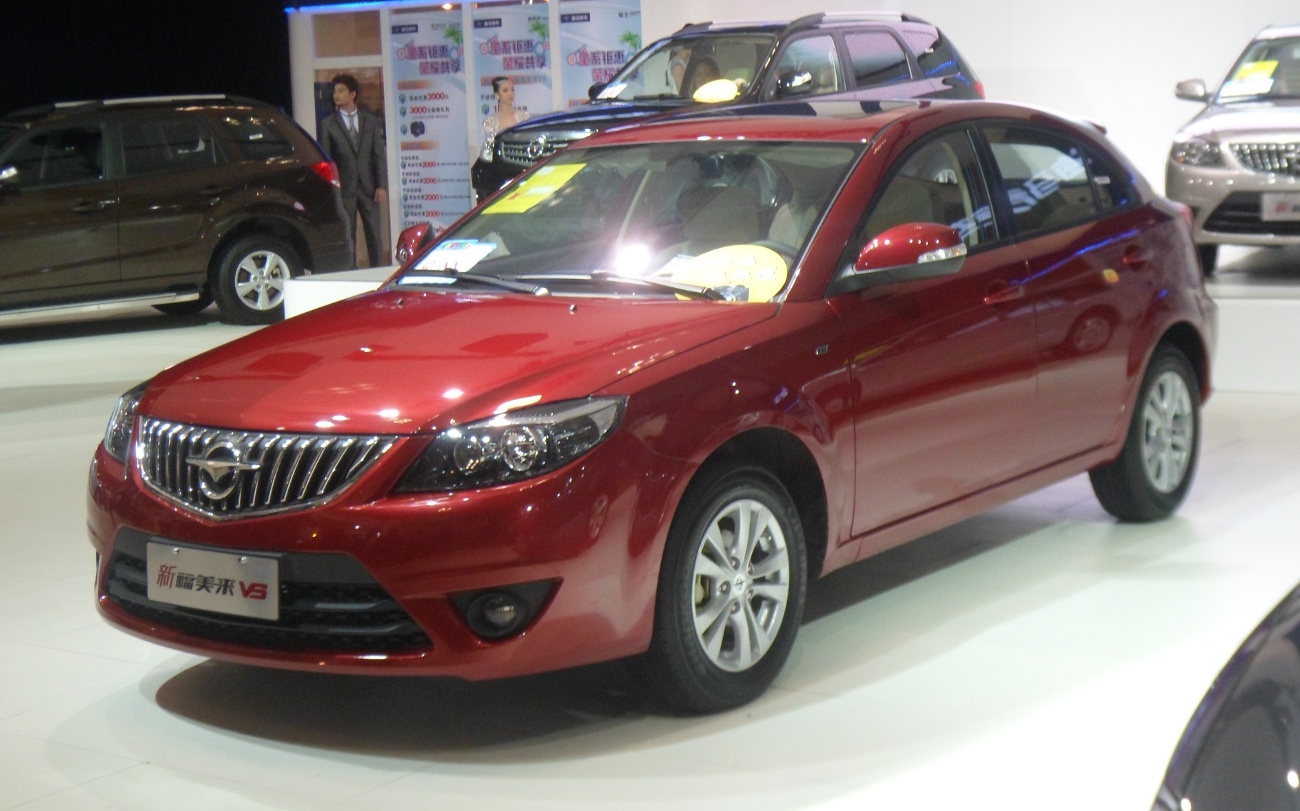
Haima Family II hatchback (facelift)

== Haima Family III (2013–2019) ==
The third generation Haima Family was only available in sedan from, and was originally sold as the Haima Family or Haima Familia (福美来) in some parts of the world featuring a brand new design. However, the model was renamed to Haima Familia M5 or Haima M5 after the facelift in 2014, putting an end to the Haima Family nameplate.

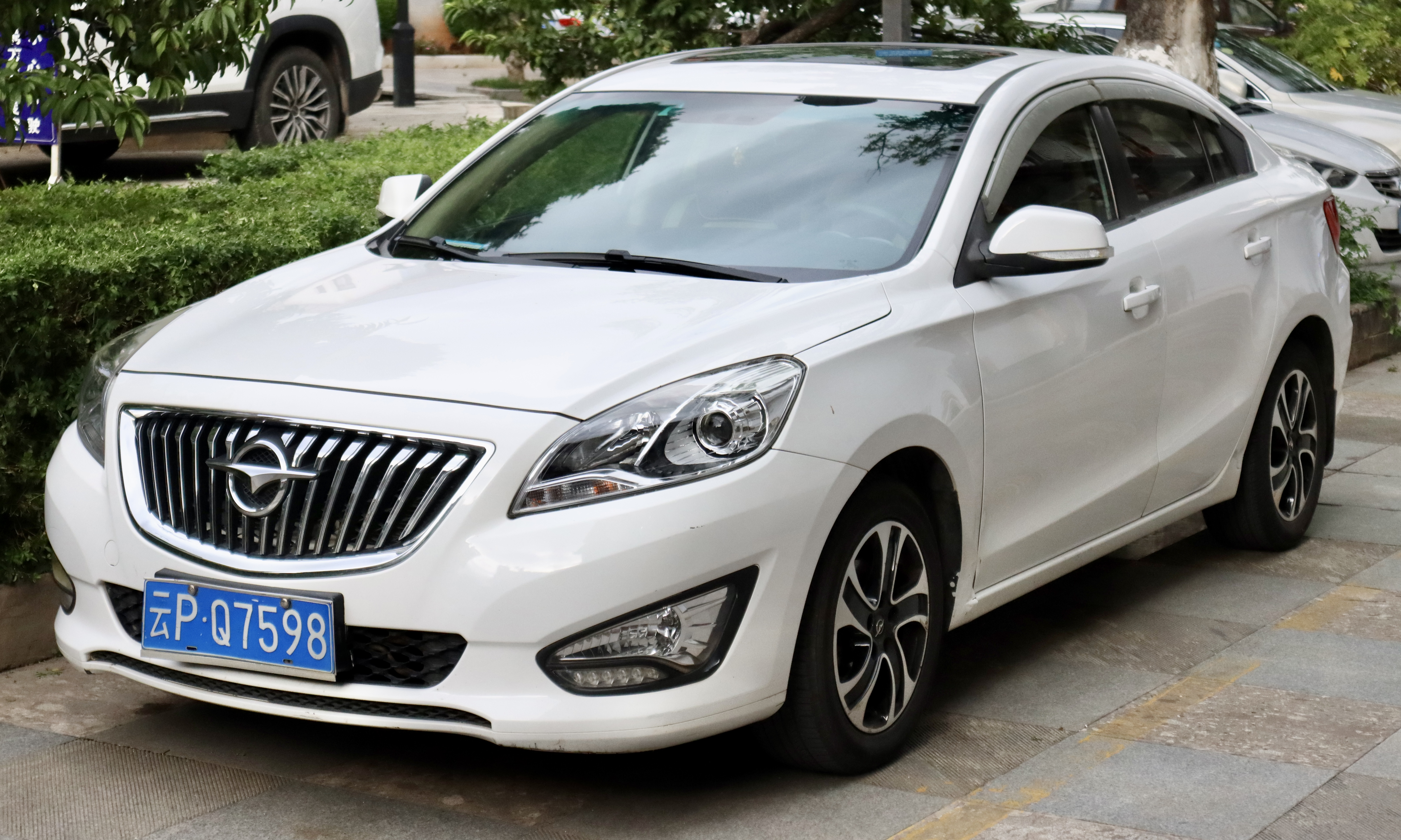
Haima Family III

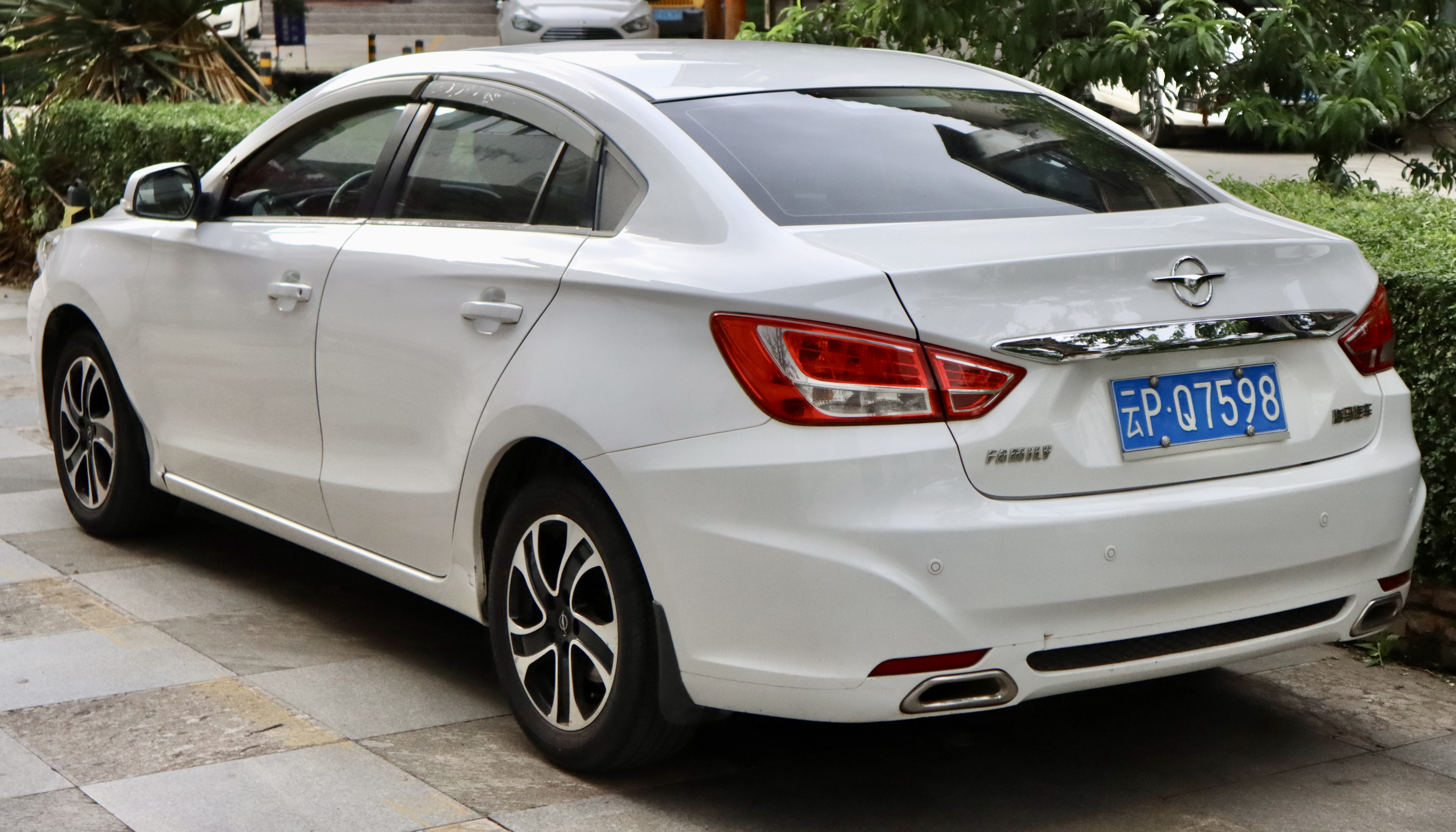
Rear view
