= M1905 =

M1905 can refer to:

- M1905 bayonet
- FN M1905 pistol
- Colt M1905 New Marine revolver
- Colt M1905 pistol
- Smith & Wesson Model 1905 revolver
- M1905 variant of the Ross rifle
- Puteaux M1905 machine gun variant of the St. Étienne Mle 1907
- 120 mm Krupp howitzer M1905
- 6-inch gun M1905

== See also ==
- M5 (disambiguation)
