= Hafei Saibao V =

Hafei Saibao V (Saibao 5)
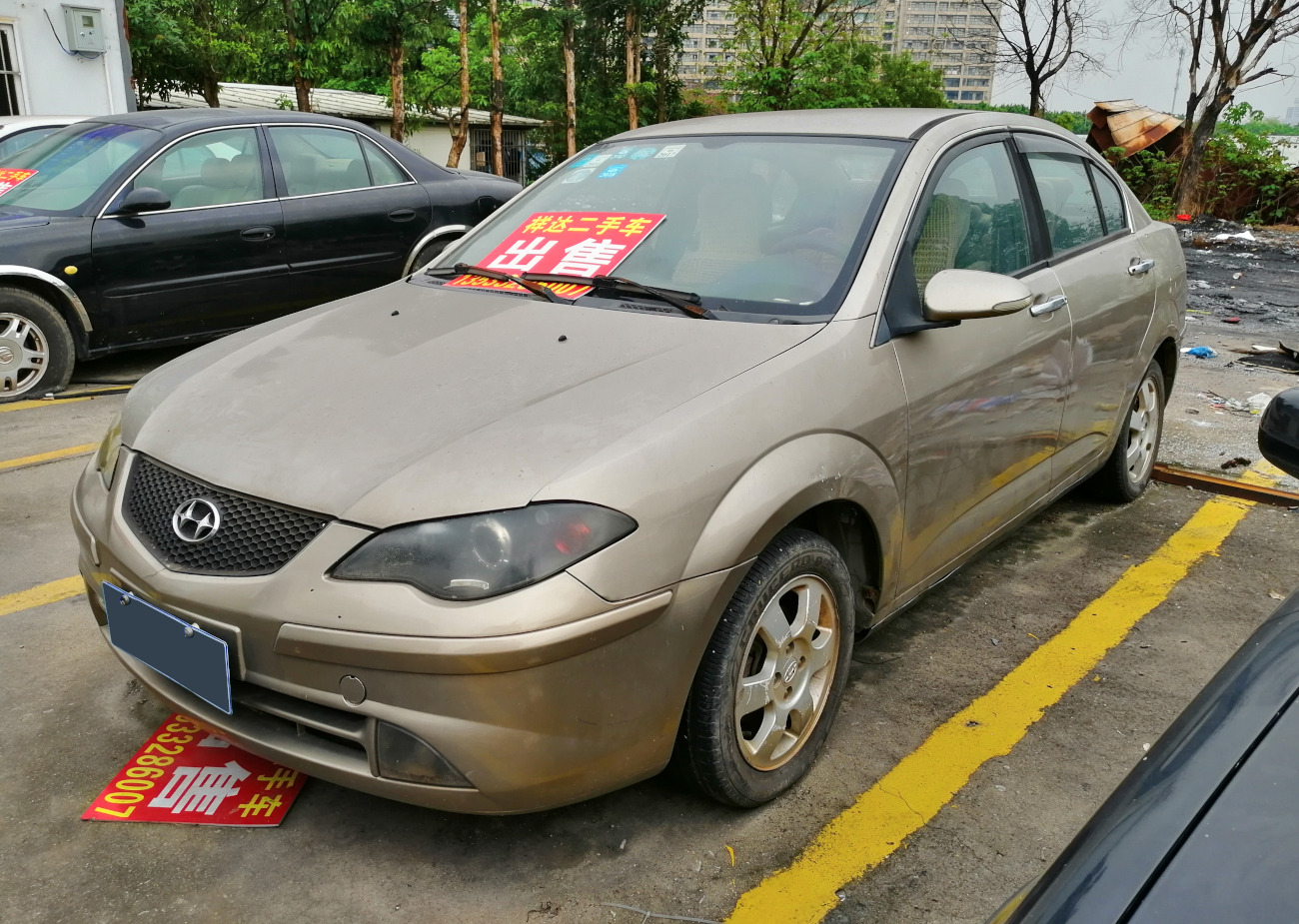
- Hafei Saibao V

Overview
- Manufacturer: Hafei
- Production: 2006–2007
- Model years: 2006–2007
- Designer: Pininfarina

Body and chassis
- Class: compact (C)
- Body style: 4-door saloon
- Layout: FF layout
- Related: Hafei Saibao III; Haima 3 Mazda3

Powertrain
- Engine: 1.6 L DA746Q I4; 1.8 L 4G93 I4
- Transmission: 5-speed manual 5-speed Semi-automatic

Dimensions
- Wheelbase: 2,600 mm (102.4 in)
- Length: 4,460 mm (175.6 in)
- Width: 1,725 mm (67.9 in)
- Height: 1,460 mm (57.5 in)
- Kerb weight: 1,180–1,225 kg (2,601–2,701 lb)

The Hafei Saibao V is a 4-door compact sedan produced by the Chinese car manufacturer Hafei. The Saibao V compact sedan is slightly larger and positioned above the Saibao III compact sedan. It was designed by Pininfarina.

== Overview ==
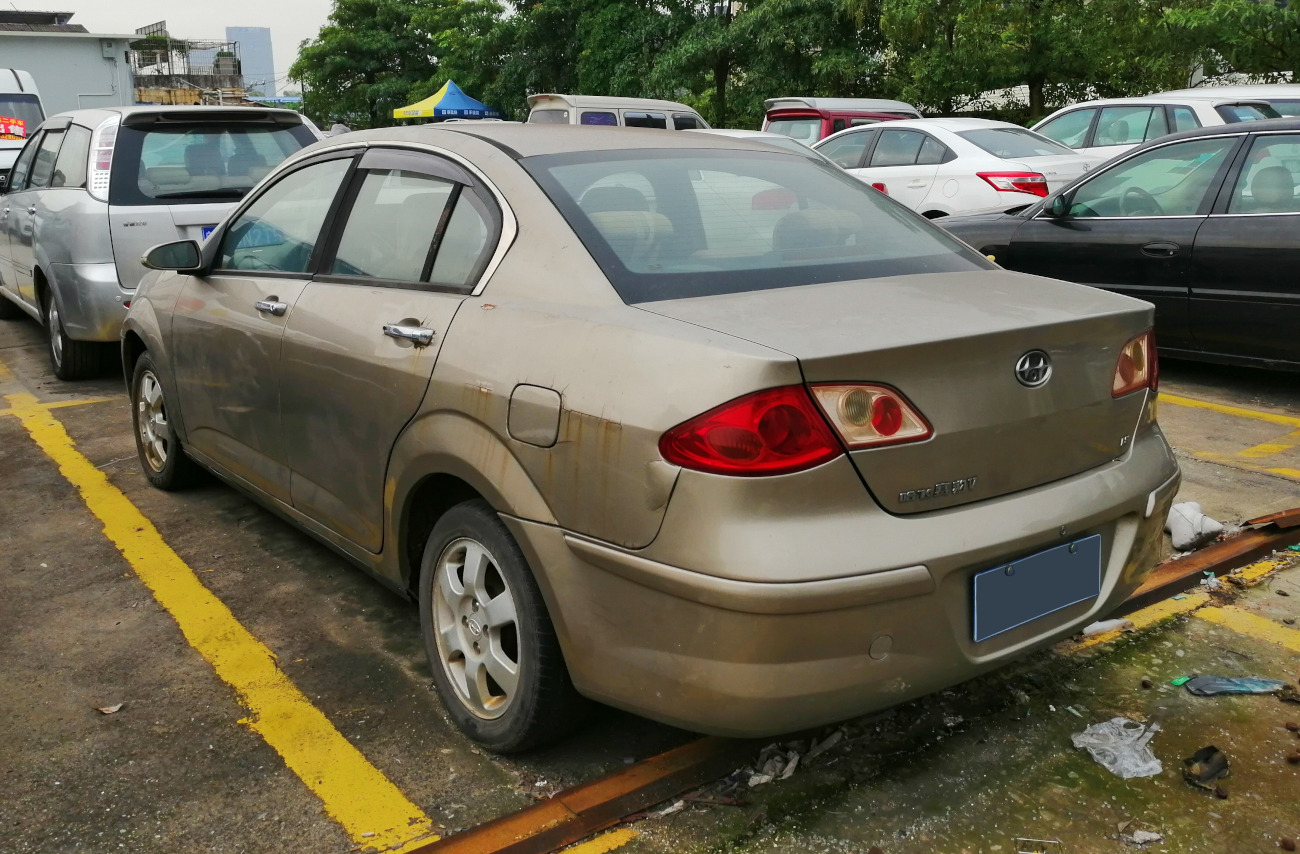
Hafei Saibao III rear quarter

The Hafei Saibao V was launched in October 2006, and is based on the same platform as the Saibao III, with the dimensions significantly larger and closer to a midsize sedan. The suspension system uses MacPherson independent suspensions for the front wheels and Multi-link suspensions for the rear with disk brakes as standard for all four wheels.

=== Powertrain ===
The regular Hafei Saibao V models are powered by a 1.8-litre (1834 cc) petrol Mitsubishi Orion engine (4G93) producing 133 hp (99 kW; 135 PS) and equipped with a 5-speed manual gearbox, with a model that features a 5-speed semi-automatic transmission being powered by a 1.6-litre (1584 cc) petrol (DA746Q) producing 101 hp (75 kW; 102 PS).
