= 5M model =

Aviation risk-management model

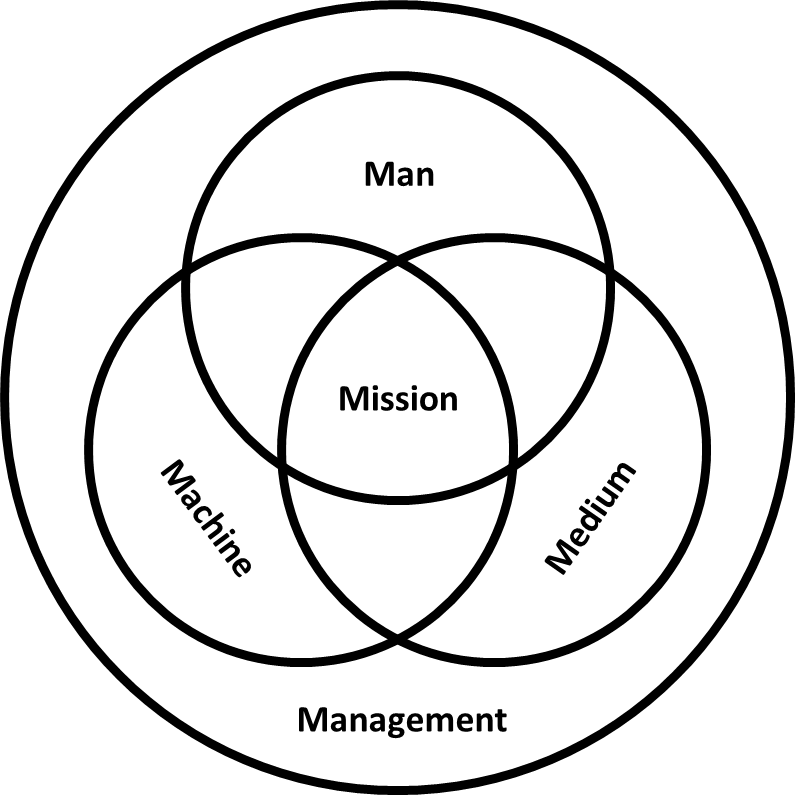
This diagram illustrates the nested/interlocking domains or factors that make up the 5M model used for troubleshooting and risk assessment, especially in traffic industries. Man, Machine, and Medium form three interlocking circles, with Mission at the intersection, and the space surrounding them representing the prevailing Management approach.

The 5M model is a troubleshooting and risk-management model used for aviation safety.

== Original labels ==
Based on T.P. Wright's original work on the man-machine-environment triad at Cornell University, the 5M model incorporates a diagram of 3 interlocking circles and one all-encompassing circle. The smaller circles are labeled Man, Machine, and Medium; the intersecting space in the middle, where they all meet, is labeled Mission; while the larger circle is labeled Management:

- Man (people): including the physiology and psychology of those involved, as well as their performance and proficiency.
- Machine (equipment): including the design, manufacture, maintenance, reliability, performance, etc.
- Medium / measurement (environment, inspection): including weather, terrain, obstructions, lighting, etc.
- Mission (purpose): the reason these three factors are brought together.
- Management (leadership): the prevailing supervisory approach in terms of regulations, policies, procedures, and attitude involved in establishing, operating, maintaining, and decommissioning.

== Expansion ==
These have been expanded by some to include an additional three, and are referred to as the 8 Ms:

- Material (includes raw material, consumables, and information)
- Method / mother nature (process, environment)
- Maintenance

== Other uses ==
This is also used in more general troubleshooting or root-cause analysis, such as with the Ishikawa diagram.

== See also ==
- Ishikawa diagram
