= Hafei Saibao III =

Chinese compact sedan

Hafei Saibao III (Saibao 3)
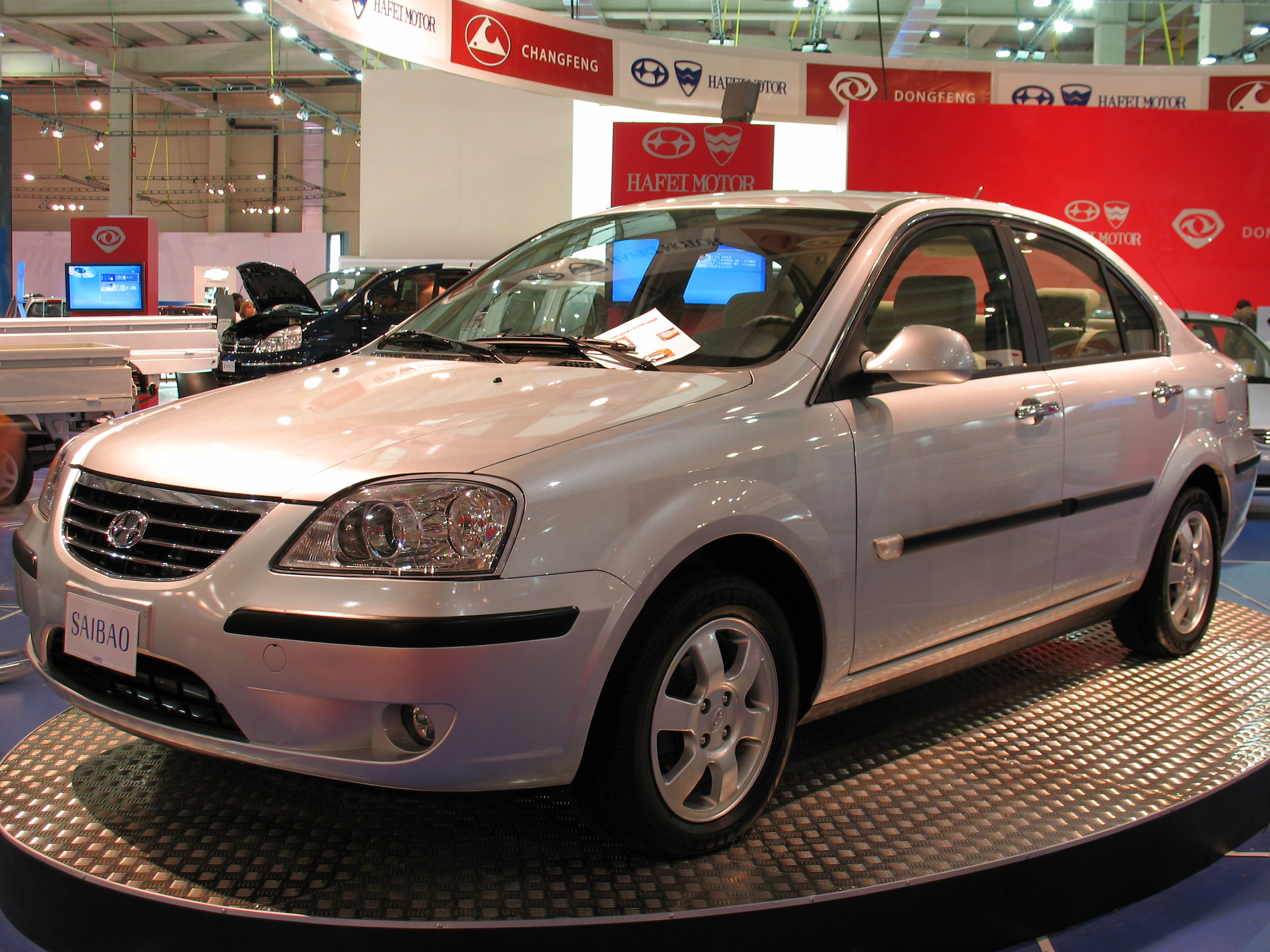

Overview
- Manufacturer: Hafei
- Also called: Coda EV; Changan E30 EV; Miles XS 200; Mullen 700e
- Production: 2005–2012
- Model years: 2005–2012
- Designer: Pininfarina

Body and chassis
- Class: compact (C)
- Body style: 4-door saloon
- Layout: FF layout
- Related: Coda EV; Hafei Saibao V Mitsubishi Lancer; Mitsubishi Carisma; Mazda 323 (BJ)

Powertrain
- Engine: 1.6 L 4G18 I4; 1.8 L 4G93 I4
- Transmission: 5-speed manual

Dimensions
- Wheelbase: 2,600 mm (102.4 in)
- Length: 4,434 mm (174.6 in)
- Width: 1,708 mm (67.2 in)
- Height: 1,471 mm (57.9 in)
- Kerb weight: 1,180 kg (2,601 lb)

The Hafei Saibao III (Chinese: 哈飞赛豹) is a 4-door compact sedan produced by the Chinese car manufacturer Hafei. The design was first shown to the public at the 2005 Geneva Motor Show. It was designed by Pininfarina.

== Overview ==
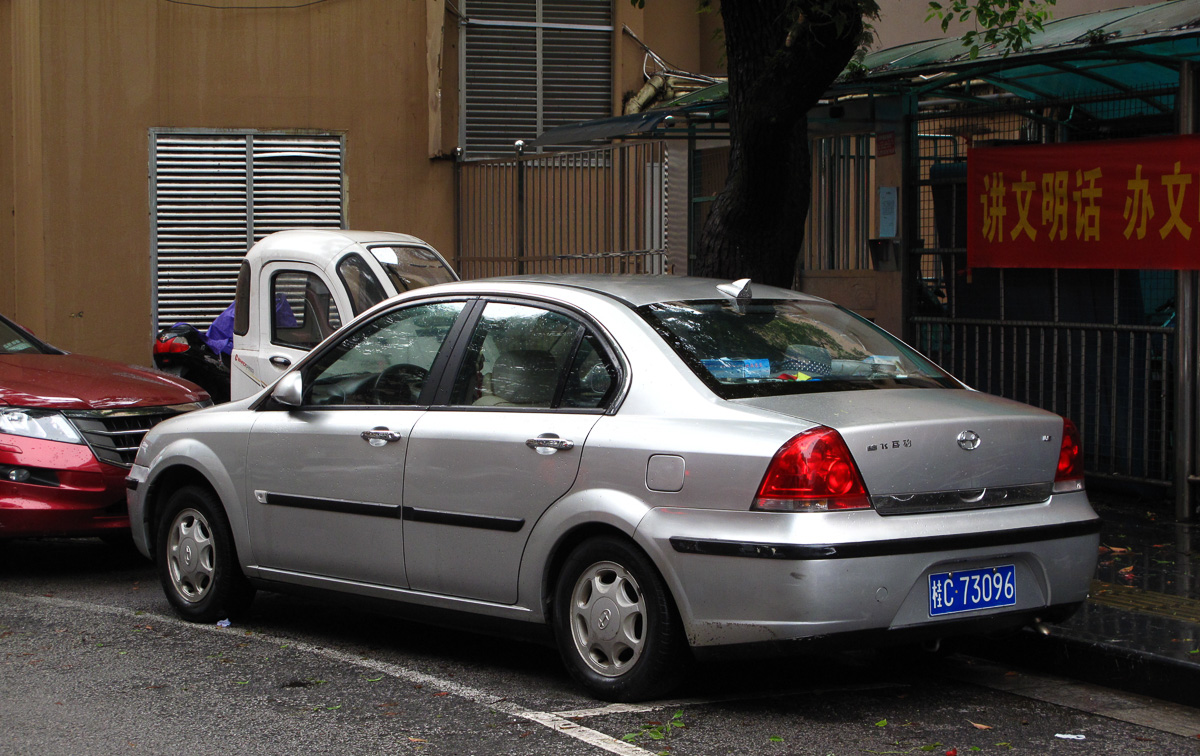
Hafei Saibao III rear quarter

The Hafei Saibao III is powered by a 1.6-litre (1584 cc) petrol Mitsubishi Orion engine (4G18) producing 101 hp (75 kW; 102 PS) and equipped with a 5-speed manual gearbox.

The Saibao provides the basis of the Coda EV, exported to the US between 2012 and 2013. Also sold as a Mullen 700e in the U.S.A. in 2015.
