= M3 =

M3, M-3 or M03 may refer to:

== Computing and electronics ==
- Apple M3, a central processing unit in the Apple M series
- Intel m3, a brand of microprocessors
- M.3 (computing) (aka NF1/NGSFF), a specification for internally mounted expansion cards
- Leica M3, a landmark 35mm rangefinder camera
- Modula-3 (M3), a programming language
- M3, a British peak programme meter standard used for measuring the volume of audio broadcasts
- m3, a macro processor for the AP-3 minicomputer, the predecessor to m4
- M3, a surface-mount version of the 1N4003 general-purpose silicon rectifier diode
- M3 (email client), an unreleased email client for the Vivaldi browser

== Entertainment ==
- M3, a comic book created by Vicente Alcazar
- M3 adapter, a Game Boy Advance movie player
- M3 (Canadian TV channel), a music and entertainment television channel
- M3 (Hungarian TV channel), a Hungarian television channel
- M3: Malay Mo Ma-develop, a 2010 Philippine TV series
- Meizu M3 Music Card, a 2007 Flash-based MP3 player
- M3 Perfect, M3 Simply and M3 Real, Nintendo DS and 3DS storage devices
- M3: The Dark Metal, a 2014 Japanese anime television series
- M3 (magazine), a Swedish technology news website

== Military ==
=== Weapons ===
- 37 mm gun M3, a light American anti-tank gun
- M3/M3E1 Multi-role Anti-armor Anti-tank Weapon System (MAAWS) (aka: Carl Gustaf 8.4 cm recoilless rifle), an 84 mm man-portable reloadable anti-tank recoilless rifle
- 90 mm gun M1/M2/M3, an American anti-aircraft and anti-tank gun
- M3 howitzer, an American light artillery piece
- Benelli M3, an Italian semi-automatic shotgun
- M3 20mm cannon, a US development of the Hispano-Suiza HS.404
- M3 trench knife, a World War II American issue knife
- M3 machine gun, a variant of the M2 Browning
- M3 submachine gun (AKA: Grease Gun), an American submachine gun
- M3 tripod, a modern tripod for the M2 Browning machine gun
- M3, a code name for a US military mission at Roosevelt Roads Naval Station in Puerto Rico

=== Vehicles ===
==== Land ====
- M3 Bradley, an American infantry fighting vehicle
- M3 Gun Motor Carriage, American tank destroyer
- M3 half-track, an armored military vehicle
- M3 Lee, an American medium tank; also known as "M3 Grant" in Commonwealth service
- Panhard M3 PTT, a French armored personnel carrier
- M3 Ram, a Canadian cruiser tank
- M3 scout car, an American armored vehicle
- M3 Stuart, an American light tank

==== Sea ====
- HMS Raglan (M3), a WWI British Royal Navy monitor
- HSwMS Visborg (M03), a Swedish Royal Navy mine layer
- HSwMS M3, a Swedish Navy mine sweeper (1940–1955)
- HMS M3, a British Royal Navy minelayer submarine of the post-WWI period

==== Amphibious ====
- M3 Amphibious Rig, a German self-propelled amphibious bridging vehicle

== Music ==
- Major third (M3), a type of musical interval
- Major thirds tuning (M3 tuning), a regular tuning with major-third intervals between successive strings
- Minor third (m3), a type of musical interval
- M3 (album), a 1999 album by Mushroomhead
- M3 (band), an American rock band
- M3 Classic Whitesnake, a band featuring Bernie Marsden, Micky Moody and Neil Murray
- M3 Records, a record label
- Korg M3, a workstation synthesizer
- Music Media-Mix Market, a doujin music convention

== Science and medicine ==
- m^{3}, the cubic metre, a unit of volume
- M_{3}, the minimal modular, but non-distributive lattice in mathematical order theory
- ATC code M03, Muscle relaxants, a subgroup of the Anatomical Therapeutic Chemical Classification System
- Messier 3 (M3), a globular cluster in the constellation Canes Venatici
- Muscarinic acetylcholine receptor M_{3}, an acetylcholine receptor
- The M-3 (My Mood Monitor) Screen, a mental health symptom checklist
- Moon Mineralogy Mapper

== Transport ==
=== Air transport ===
- ABSA - Aerolinhas Brasileiras IATA airline designator M3, a cargo airline based in Campinas, Brazil
- Miles M.3 Falcon, a 1930s British four-seat cabin monoplane
- DJI Matrice 3, a Chinese industrial drone
- DJI Mavic 3, a Chinese camera drone

=== Automobiles ===
- Bisu M3, a Chinese MPV
- BMW M3, a German compact performance car series
- BYD M3, a Chinese MPV
- Dongfeng Fengxing Lingzhi M3, a Chinese MPV
- Haima M3, a Chinese subcompact sedan
- JAC Refine M3, a Chinese MPV
- XPeng Mona M03, a Chinese battery electric compact sedan

=== Roads and routes ===
- Eastern Freeway (Melbourne), part of the M3 in Victoria, Australia
- EastLink (Melbourne), part of the M3 in Victoria, Australia
- Highway M03 (Ukraine), an international highway connecting Kyiv with Dovzhansky
- M3 highway (Russia), another name for the Ukraine Highway in Russia
- M-3 (Michigan highway), a state highway in the Detroit metropolitan area
- M3 motorway (disambiguation), several roads
- M3 (New York City bus), a New York City Bus route in Manhattan
- M3 Milton–City Centre, a bus route in Glasgow
- M3 (East London), a Metropolitan Route in East London, South Africa
- M3 (Cape Town), a Metropolitan Route in Cape Town, South Africa
- M3 (Pretoria), a Metropolitan Route in Pretoria, South Africa
- M3 (Port Elizabeth), a Metropolitan Route in Port Elizabeth, South Africa
- Route M-3 (MTA Maryland), a former bus route in Baltimore, Maryland
- Jalan Datuk Wira Poh Ah Tiam, numbered M3 in Malacca, Malaysia
- M3 road (Zambia), a road in Zambia
- M3 road (Malawi), a road in Malawi

=== Rail transport ===
- LCDR M3 class, a steam locomotive class of the London, Chatham & Dover Railway
- M1/M3 (railcar), a Long Island Rail Road and Metro-North Railroad railcar
- Sri Lanka Railways M3, a diesel-electric locomotive class of Sri Lanka Railways
- Line M3 (Budapest Metro), the North-South Line of the Budapest Metro, Hungary
- M3 (Copenhagen Metro) (City Circle Line or Cityringen), a future expansion of the Copenhagen Metro
- M3 (Istanbul Metro), a rapid transit line in the European part of Istanbul, Turkey
- Bucharest Metro Line M3, a rapid transit line in Bucharest, Romania
- Milan Metro Line 3, a subway line serving Milan, Italy

== Other uses ==
- M3, an ISO metric screw thread size
- M3 (economics), a measure of the money supply
- M3 (hieroglyph), the Ancient Egyptian baker's tool hieroglyph
- MLBB M3 World Championship, the third Mobile Legends: Bang Bang World Championship held in 2021
- M3, a difficulty grade in mixed climbing
- McLaren M3, a racing car

== See also ==
- MMM (disambiguation)
- 3M (disambiguation)
- M1903 (disambiguation)
- List of highways numbered 3
