= JAC Refine R3 =

Compact MPV

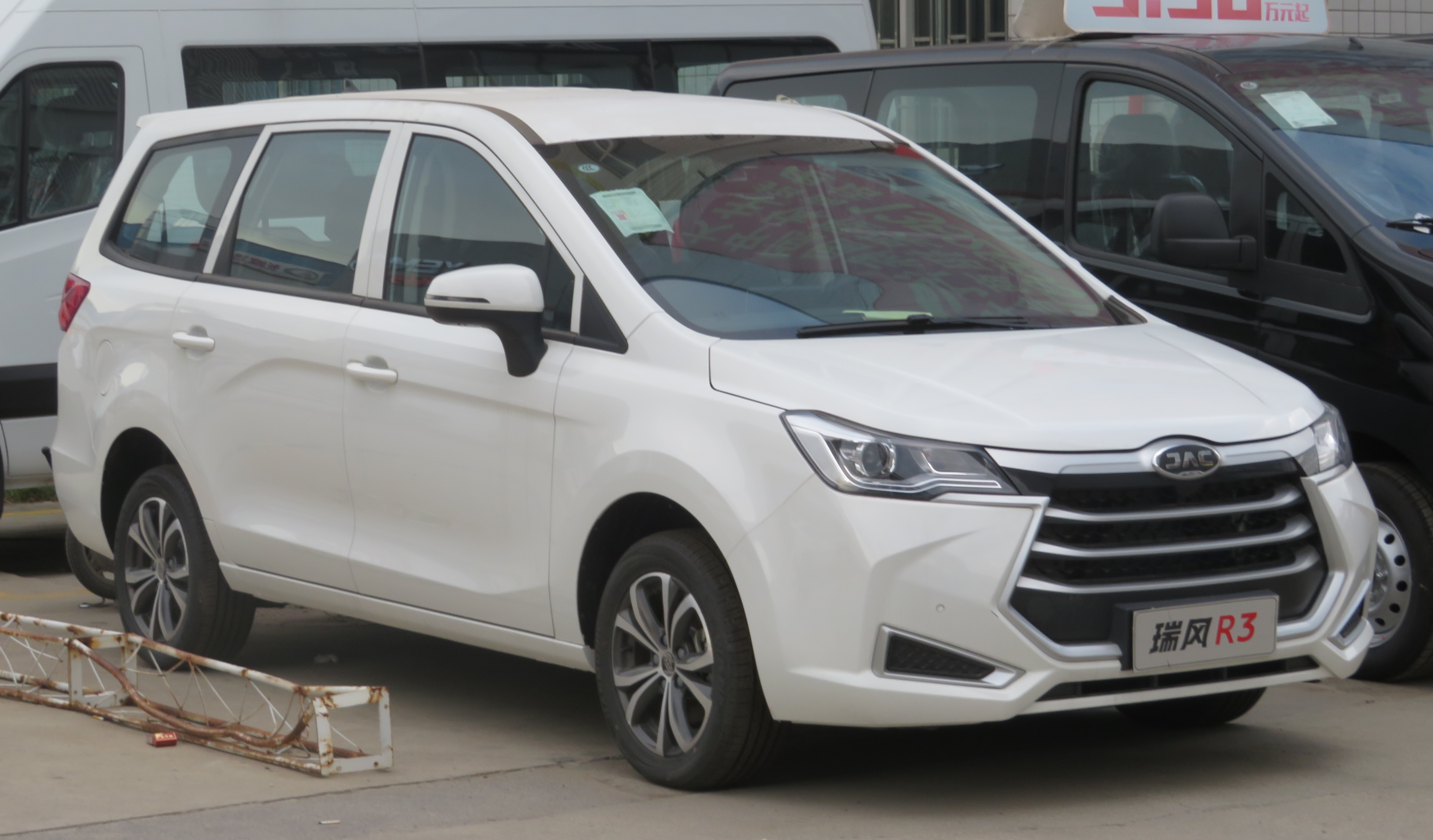

Overview
- Manufacturer: JAC Group
- Production: 2017–2025
- Model years: 2018–2026
- Assembly: China: Hefei

Body and chassis
- Class: Compact MPV (M)
- Body style: 5-door minivan

Powertrain
- Engine: 1.6 L I4
- Transmission: CVT; 5-speed manual

Dimensions
- Wheelbase: 109 in (2,760 mm)
- Length: 187 in (4,750 mm)
- Width: 72 in (1,835 mm)
- Height: 70 in (1,773 mm)

The JAC Refine R3 is a compact MPV produced by JAC Group.

== Overview ==
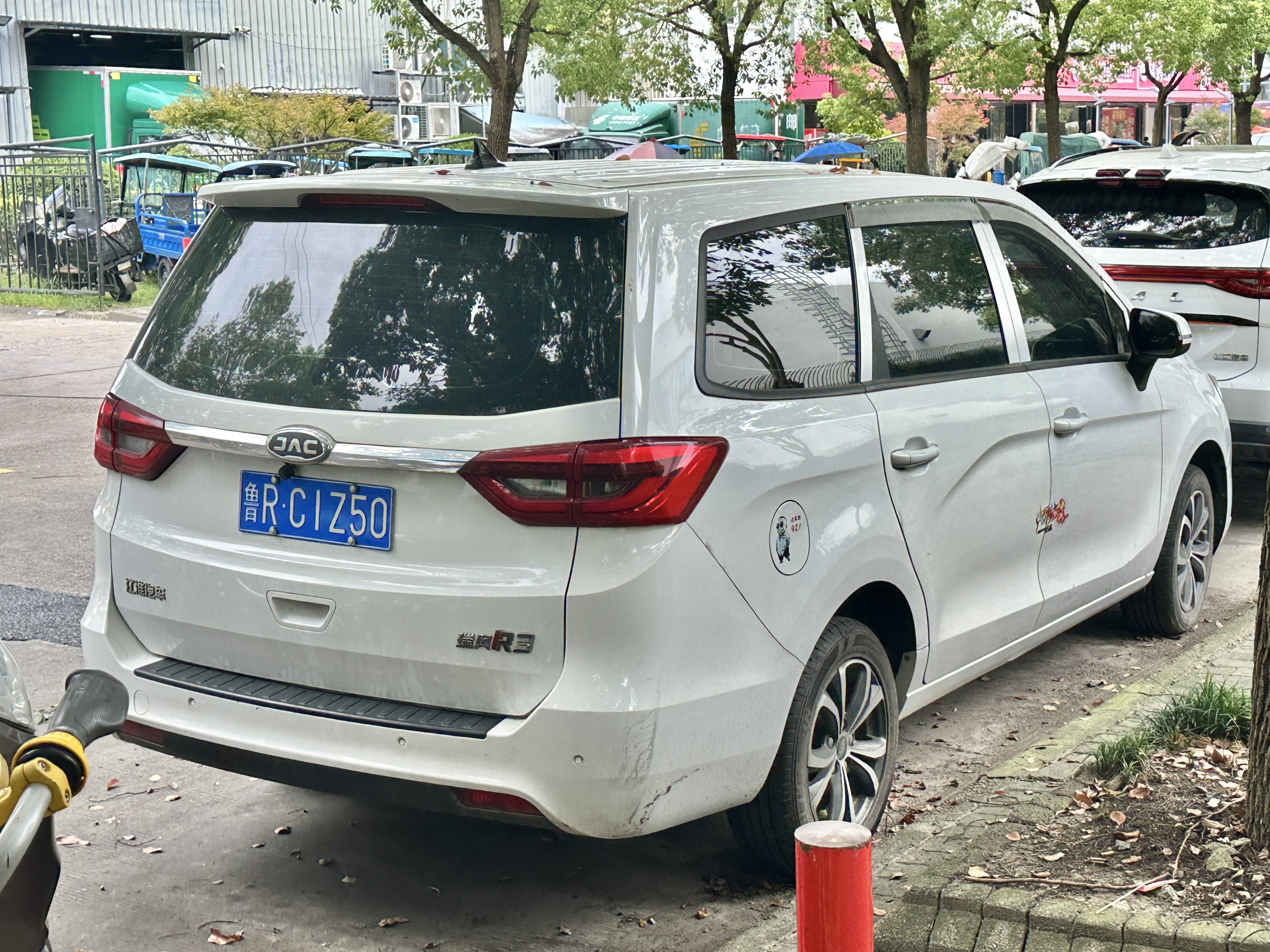
Rear view

The Refine R3 was revealed during the 2017 Guangzhou Auto Show with prices ranging from 64,800 yuan to 90,800 yuan. But it was originally planned to be the second generation Refine M2. The Refine R3 seats seven people in a 2-2-3 setup and positioned in between the Refine M2 and Refine M3.

Powertain of the Refine R3 comes from a 1.6 liter inline-four engine with 120 hp and 155 Nm, the engine is mated to a five-speed manual gearbox powering the front wheels.
