= 3M (disambiguation) =

3M is an American multinational conglomerate corporation.

3M may also refer to:

- 3M computer - 1980s minimum workstation spec for serious academic, technical use
- 3-M syndrome, or dolichospondylic dysplasia, gloomy face syndrome, le Merrer syndrome
- Myasishchev 3M, Soviet bomber, NATO reporting name Bison-B
- Military Mapping Maidens, U.S. women mapmakers during World War II
- 3-metre springboard
- The IATA code for Silver Airways

== See also ==
- Triple M (disambiguation)
- MMM (disambiguation)
- M3 (disambiguation)
