= MMMM =

MMMM or mmmm may refer to:

== Arts and entertainment ==
- MM Mickey Mouse Mystery Magazine
- Major Minor's Majestic March, videogame
- Marvin's Marvelous Mechanical Museum (album), 2005, by Tally Hall

== Other uses ==
- General Francisco J. Mujica International Airport, Mexican airport, ICAO code: MMMM
- 4000 (number) expressed in Roman numbers
- An indication that a month should be written as a word, in some date formats

== See also ==
- Mmmh (disambiguation)
- MMM (disambiguation)
