= JAC Heyue =

Chinese automobile

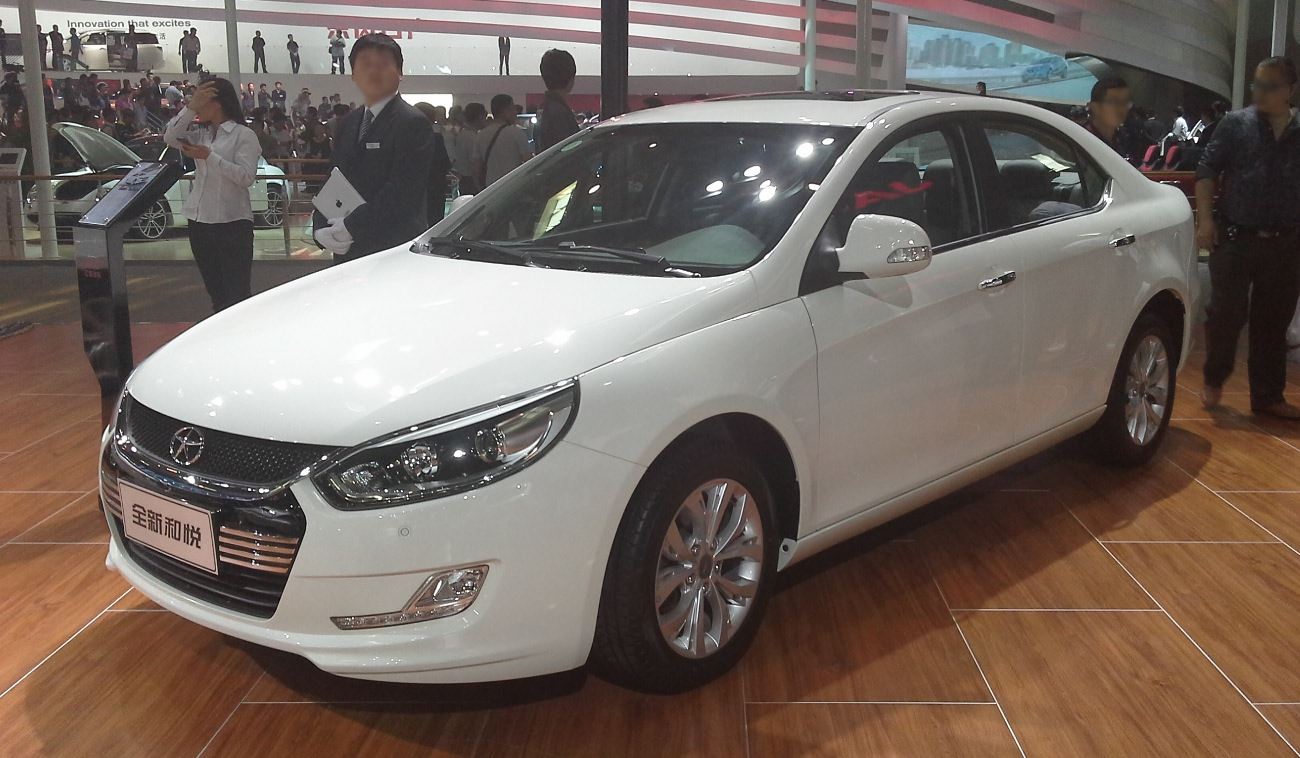

Overview
- Manufacturer: JAC Motors
- Also called: Heyue J5; Heyue B15; Heyue Sedan; JAC J5; JAC B15; JAC iEVA50
- Production: 2011–2017; 2018–present (iEVA50)
- Model years: 2011–2017; 2018–2020 (iEVA50)
- Designer: Pininfarina

Body and chassis
- Body style: 4-door sedan 5-door hatchback
- Related: JAC J3; JAC J6

Powertrain
- Engine: 1.5 L I4 DOHC (petrol); 1.8 L I4 (petrol)
- Transmission: 5-speed manual 5-speed automatic

Dimensions
- Wheelbase: 2,710 mm (106.7 in)
- Length: 4,590 mm (180.7 in)
- Width: 1,765 mm (69.5 in)
- Height: 1,465 mm (57.7 in)(sedan); 1,425 mm (56.1 in)(RS)
- Curb weight: 1,325 mm (52.2 in)

Chronology
- Successor: Sehol A5

The JAC J5 or Heyue Sedan is a compact sedan produced by JAC Motors under the Heyue brand in China.

== Overview ==
The JAC Heyue sedan was launched in the Chinese market with prices ranging from 62,800 to 75,800 yuan. The Heyue sedan is powered by a 1.5 liter Straight-4 petrol engine and a 1.8 liter straight-4 petrol engine with transmission options including a 5-speed manual transmission and a 5-speed automatic transmission.

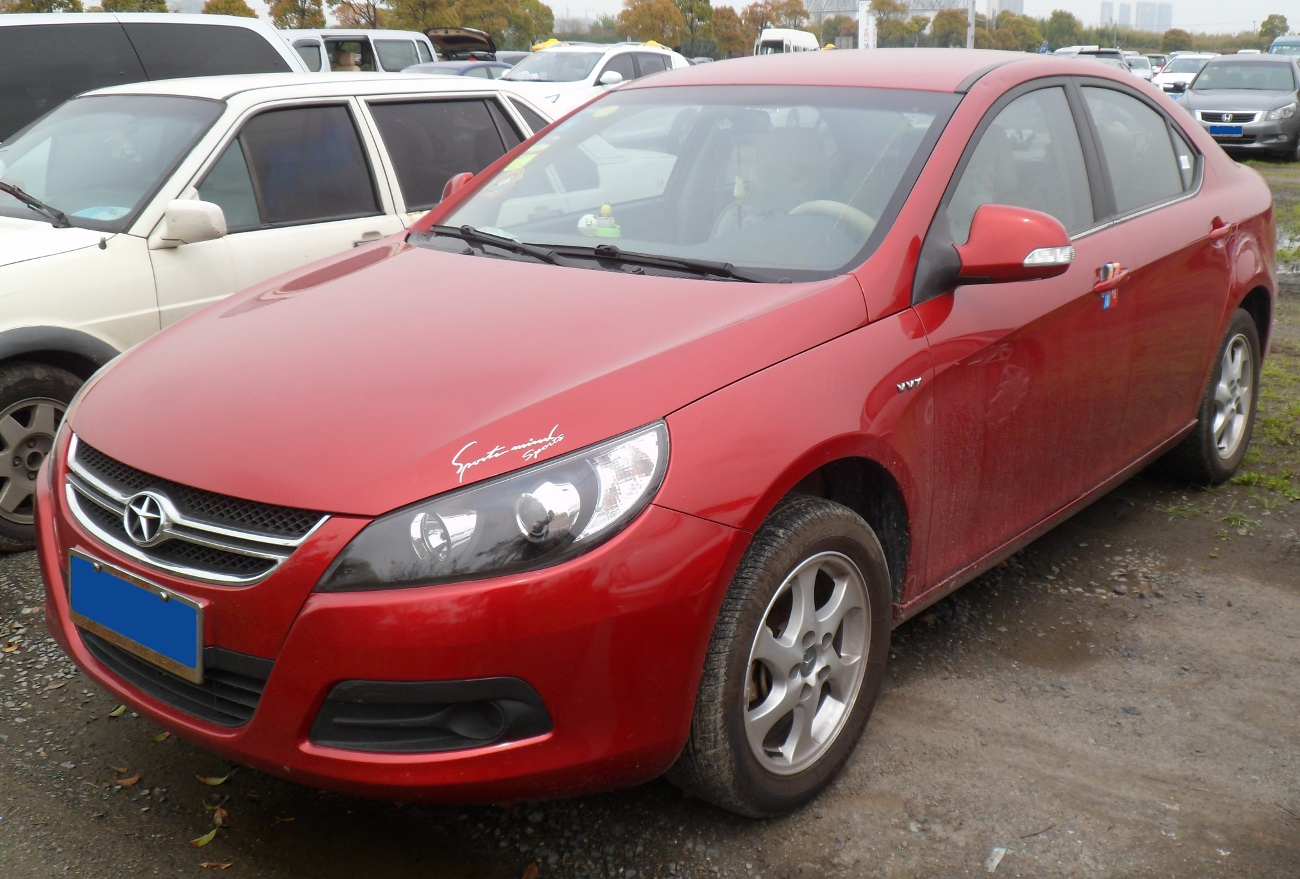
JAC Heyue

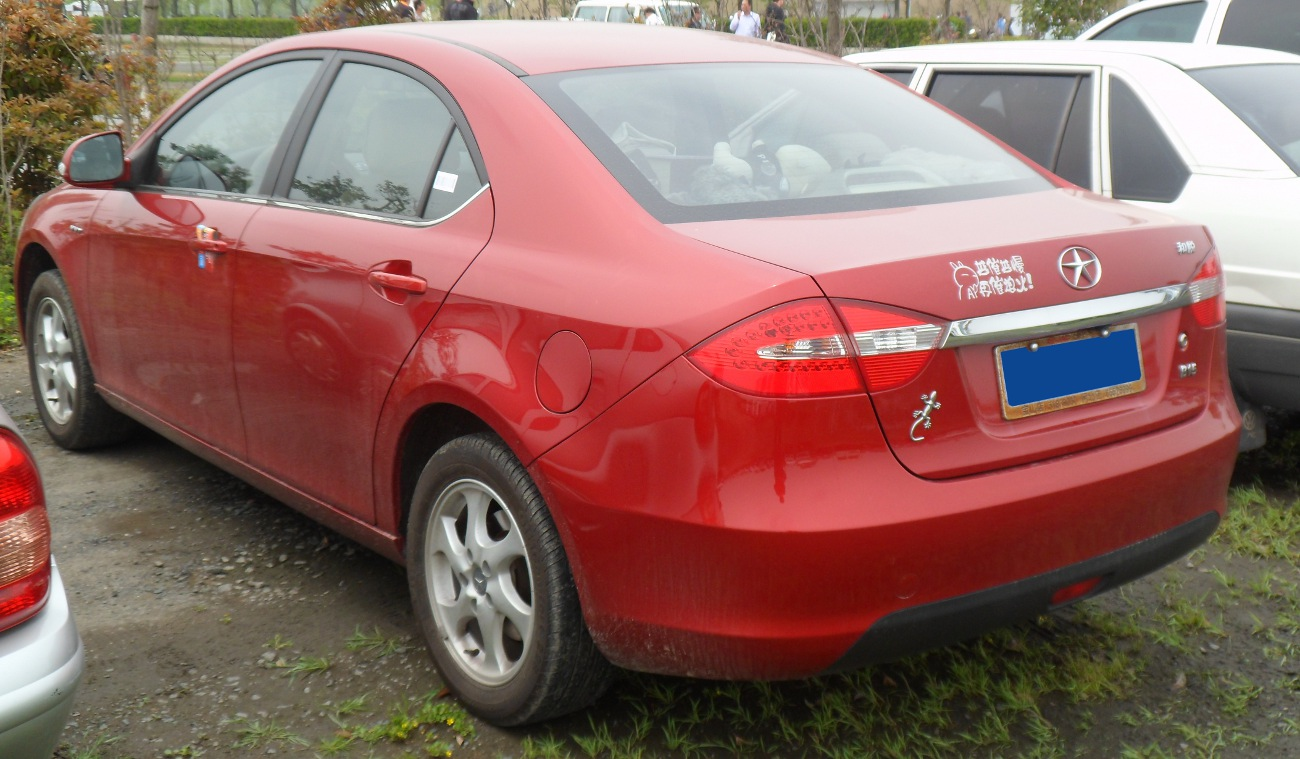
JAC Heyue

=== 2014 facelift ===
A facelift was revealed in March 2014 featuring restyled front and rear fascias. Prices ranges from 73,800 yuan to 98,800 yuan.

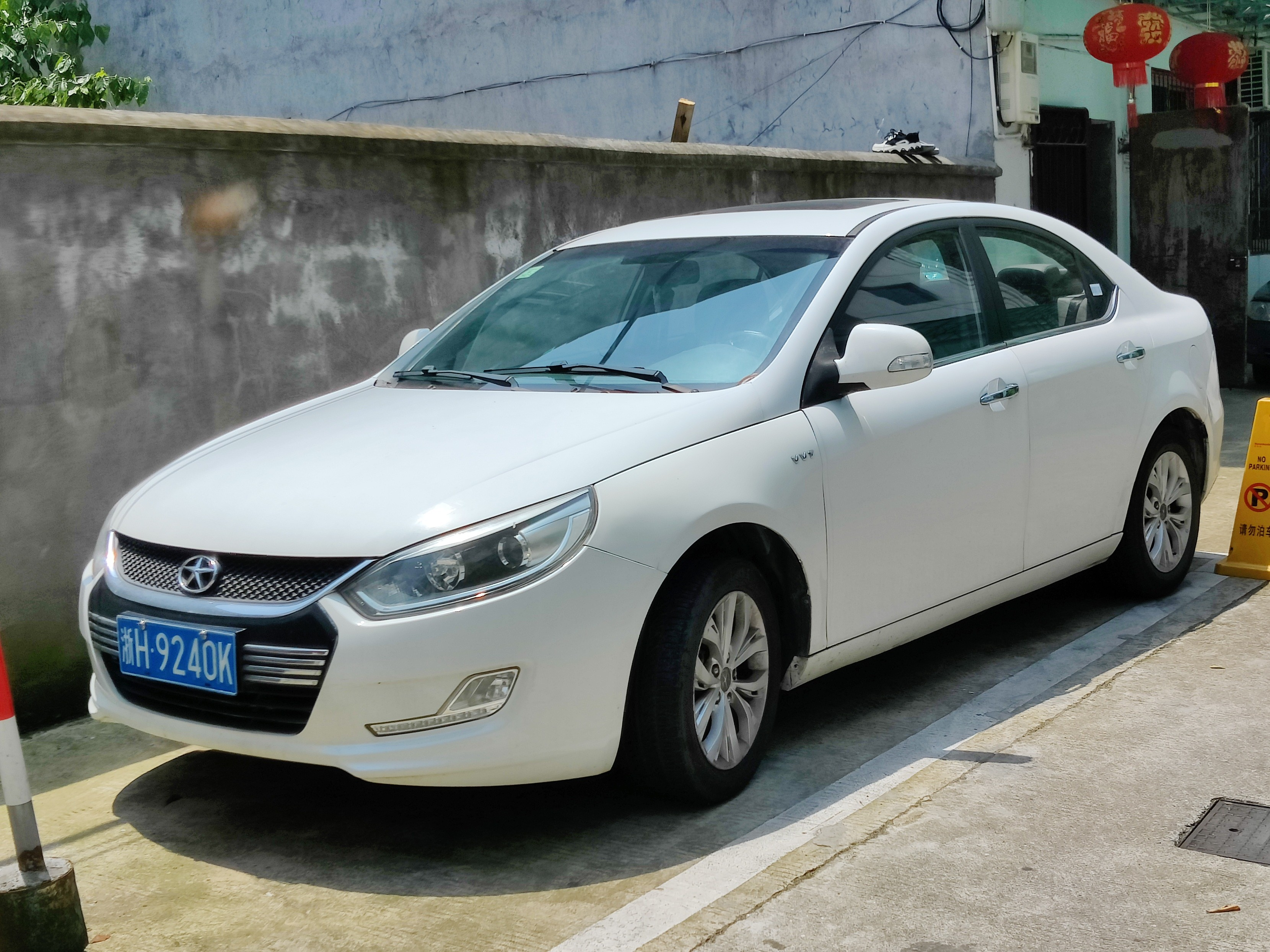
JAC Heyue facelift

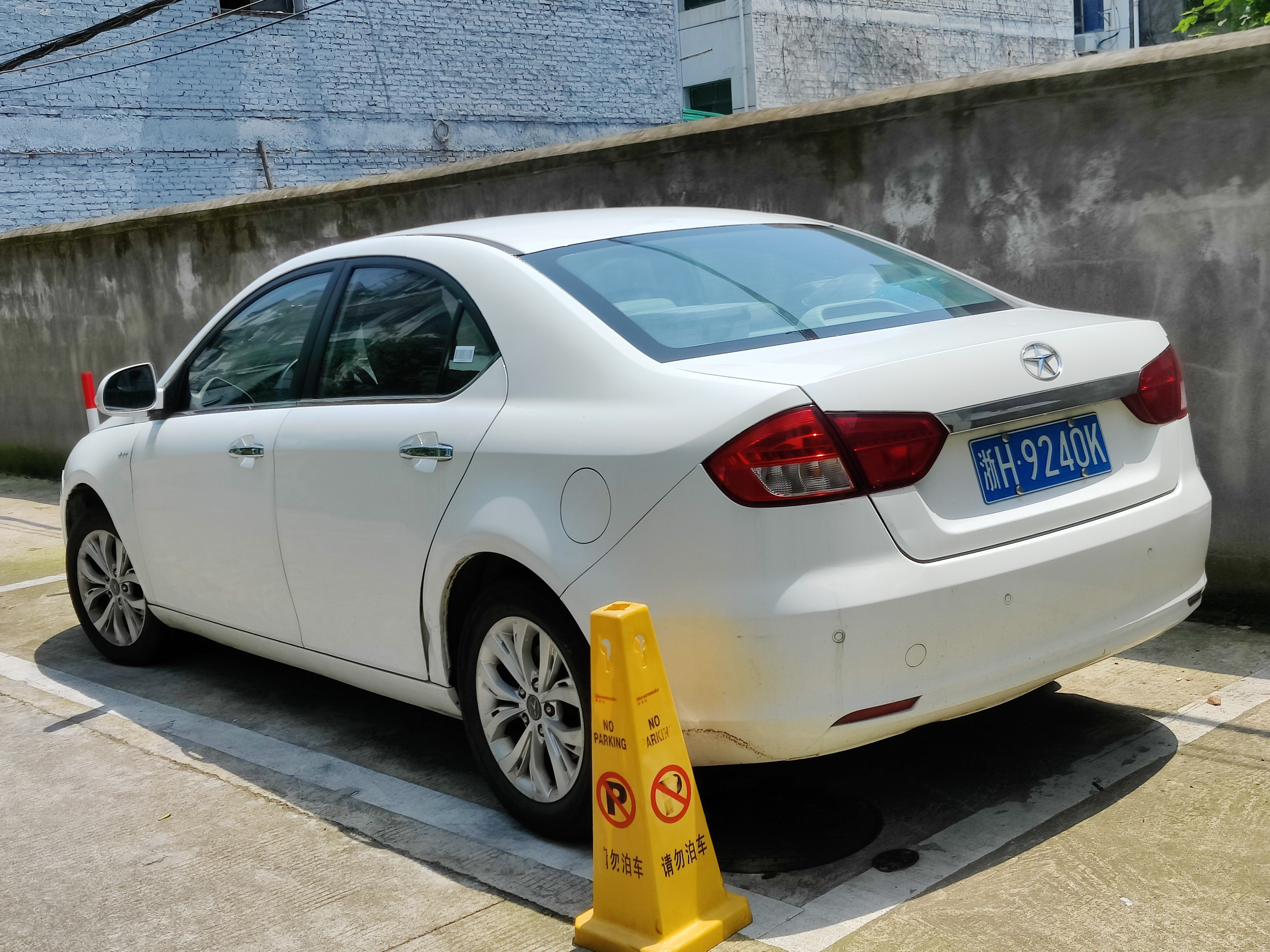
JAC Heyue facelift

=== JAC Heyue Sedan Sport Edition ===
The JAC Heyue Sport Edition was launched on the Chinese car market in May 2012 with a price of 87,800 yuan. It is based on the standard Heyue Sedan while featuring different alloys, a spoiler and a body kit. Engine is the same as in the standard Heyue Sedan.

== JAC iEVA50 ==
The JAC iEVA50 is the electric vehicle version of the Heyue Sedan with a NEDC range of 500 kilometers launched in March 2018. The iEVA50 is powered by an electric motor over the front axle with an output of 144 hp. 60-kWh batteries are located under the rear seats. A base trim version with a less powerful battery pack of 47 kWh is also available with a NEDC range of 330 kilometers.

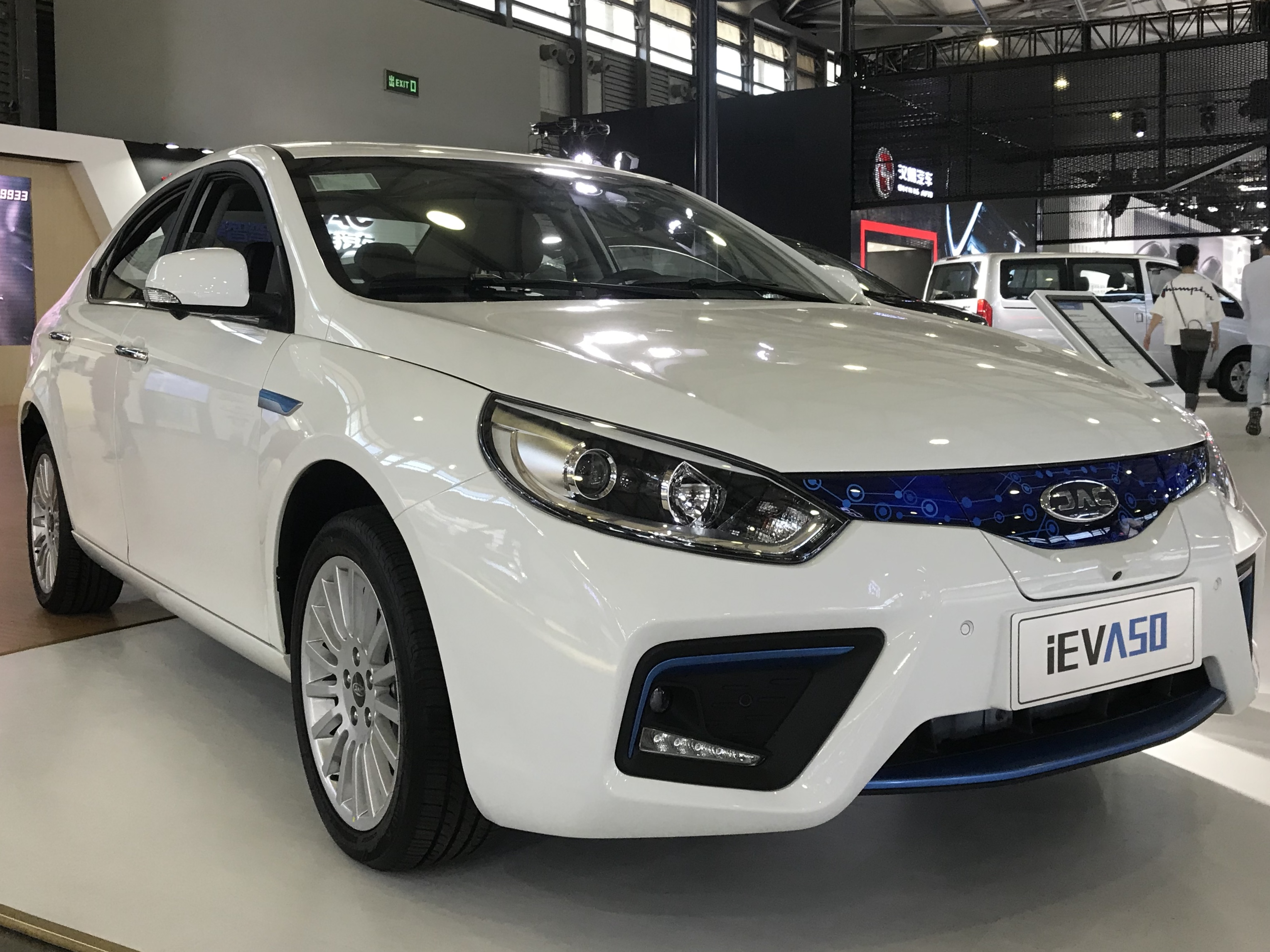
iEVA50

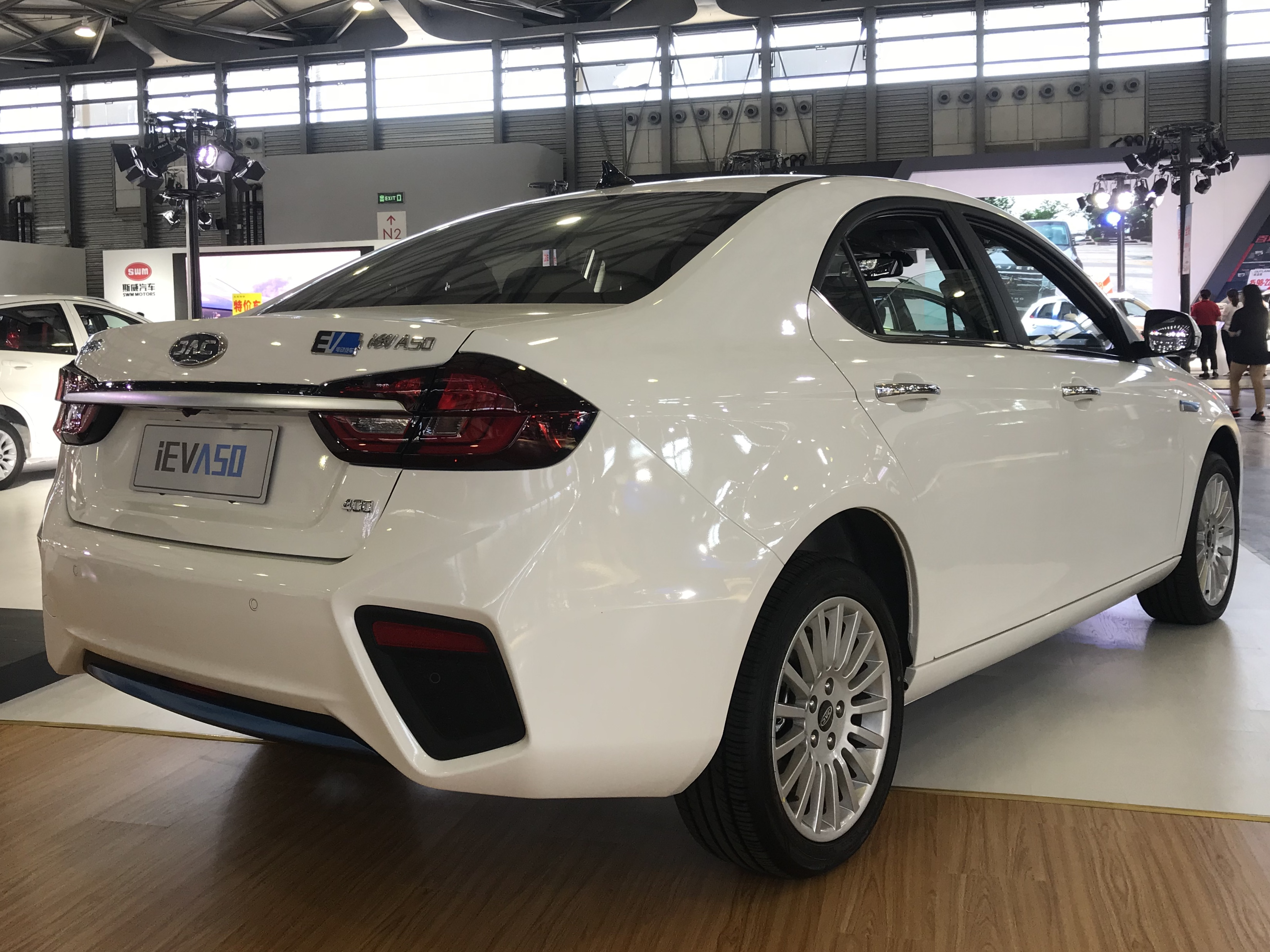
iEVA50

=== 2019 facelift ===
A facelift was launched in 2019 featuring restyled front and rear end designs.

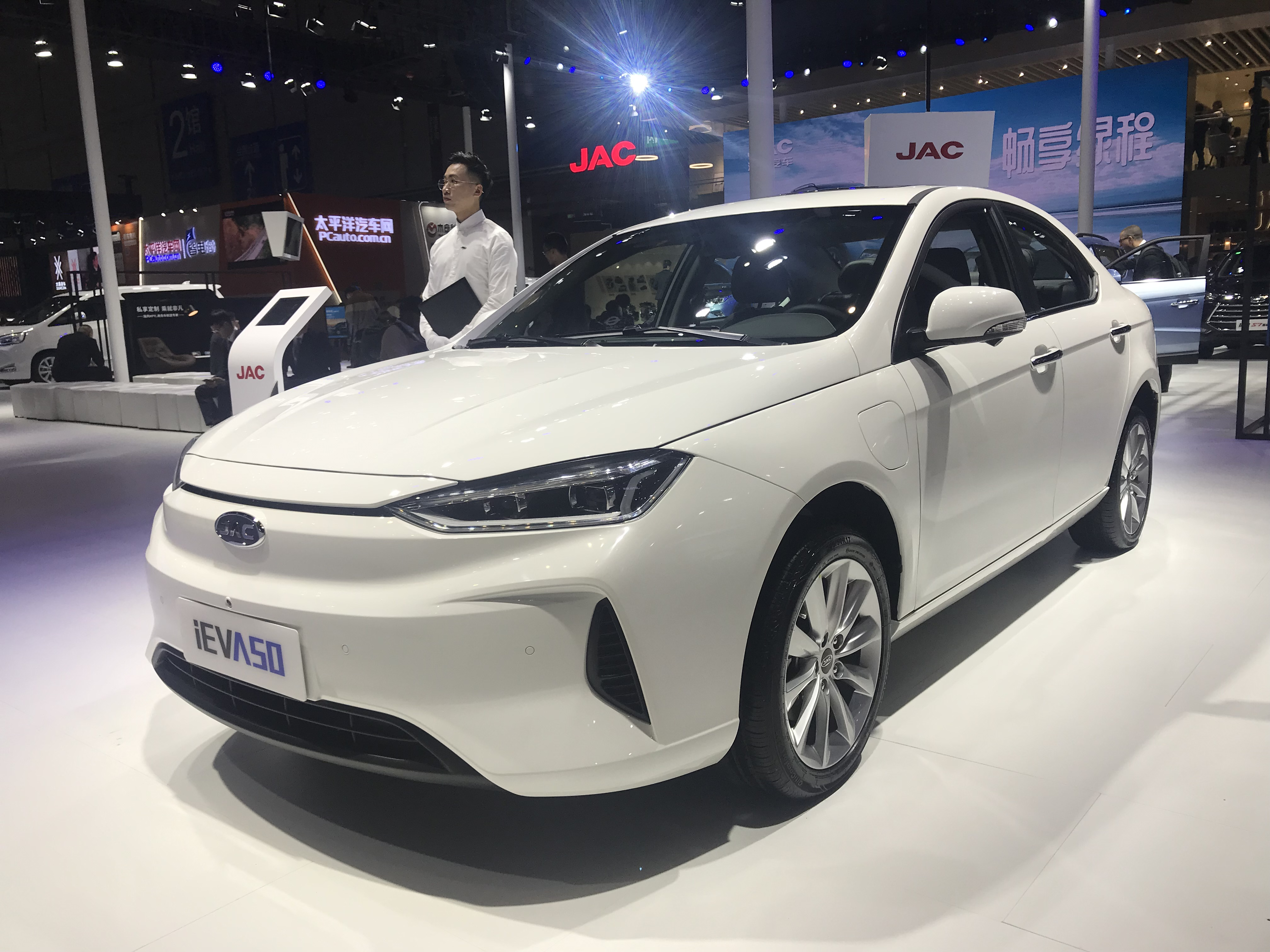
iEVA50 2019 facelift

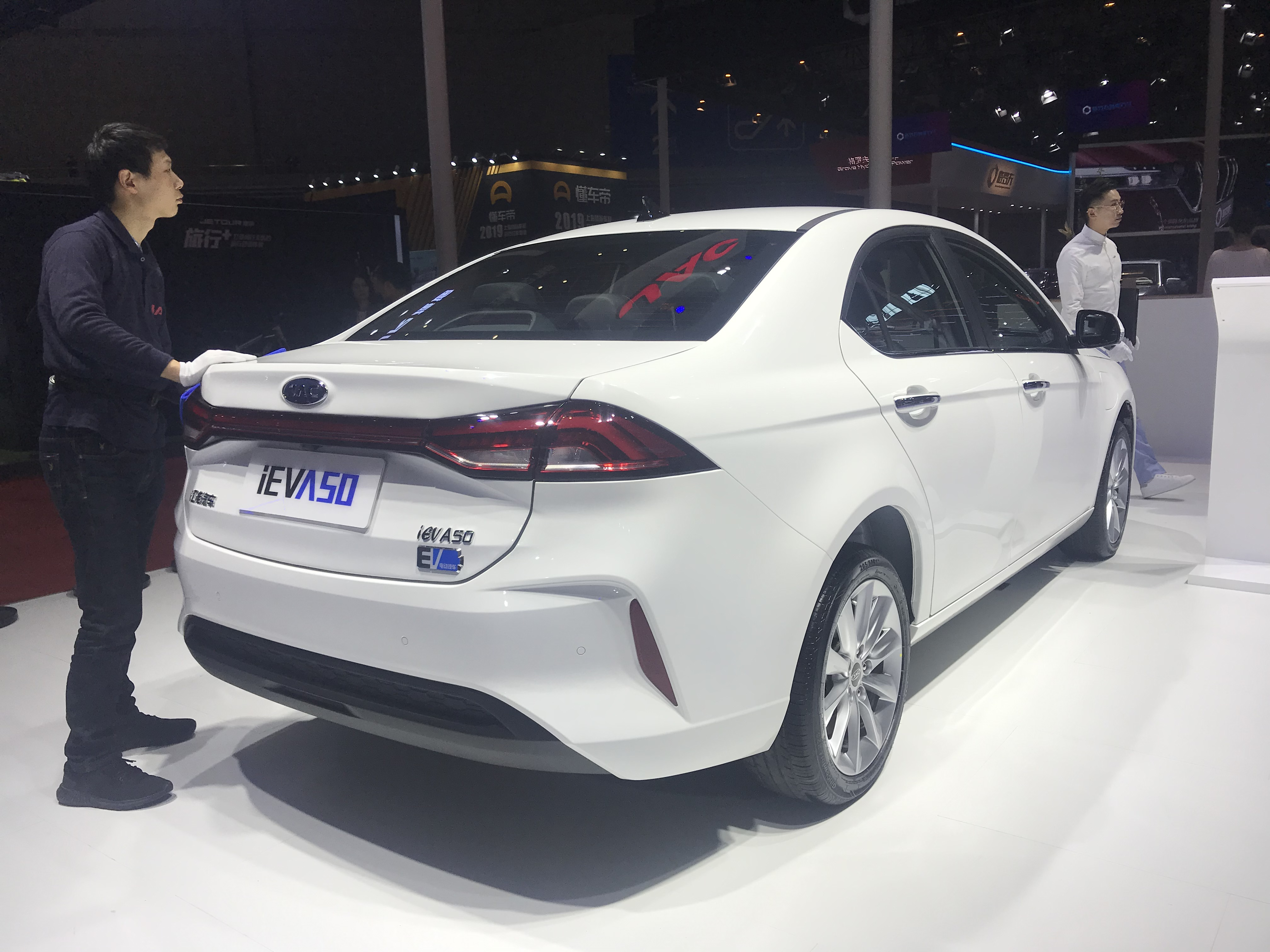
iEVA50 2019 facelift

== Sales ==
Year	Brazil
2011	80
2012	2,070
2013	1,311
2014	597
2015	255
2016	96
2017	89
2018	3
