= Triple M (disambiguation) =

Triple M is an Australian radio network.

Triple M or variation, may also refer to:

- Triple M Sydney (call sign 2MMM), the first radio station in the Triple M network, originally branded "Triple M"
- WMMM-FM (branded "Triple M"), a radio station in Madison, Wisconsin, US
- WMMM (branded "Triple M"), former call sign for WSHU (AM), Westport, Connecticut, US
- KMMM (branded "Triple M"), an AM radio station in Pratt, Kansas, US
- KMMM-FM, (branded "Triple M") former call sign for KHTT, an FM radio station in Tulsa, Oklahoma, US
- "La Triple M", a 2023 single by Mawell.

== See also ==
- MMM (disambiguation)
- 3M (disambiguation)
- M3 (disambiguation)
