= Mmmh =

Mmm, Mmmh, Mmmm, Mmmmm!, Mmm mmm mmm and variants may refer to:

== Books ==
- "Mmmh!!", a collection of speechless B/W short stories by comic book collective Polaqia

== Music ==
=== Albums ===
- Mmm, Mmm, Mmm, 1997, by Home Cookin'
- Mmhmm, 2004, by Relient K
- Mmmm!, 2008, by Floor Thirteen

=== Songs ===
- "Mmmh" (song), 2020 single by Kai
- "Mmhmm" (song), 2023 single by BigXthaPlug
- "Mmm Mmm Mmm Mmm", 1993, by the Crash Test Dummies
- "Mmm" (song), 2020, by Treasure
- "Mmm...", 2007, by Irish singer Laura Izibor
- "Mmmm", by DJ Python from Mas Amable
- "Mmmh", 2006, by Die Apokalyptischen Reiter from Riders on the Storm
- "Mmm Mmm", 2021, by Kaliii
- "Mmmh Mmmh", 2014, by Young Fathers from their album Dead
- "Mmm, Mmm, Mmm", 2014 single by Dylan Scott

=== Performers ===
- Mmmh!, a sub group of Japanese psychedelic band Acid Mothers Temple

== See also ==
- MMM (disambiguation)
- MMMM (disambiguation)
