= M1903 =

M1903, meaning Model of 1903, can refer to a number of different pieces of equipment

- M1903 Springfield rifle
- FN Model 1903
- Colt Model 1903 Pocket Hammer
- Colt Model 1903 Pocket Hammerless
- 3-inch gun M1903
- 6-inch gun M1903

== See also ==
- M03 (disambiguation)
