= My Mood Monitor Screen =

- LOINC: 71569-8, 71891-6

The My Mood Monitor Screen (a.k.a. M3 Checklist) is a quick, validated, self-rated, multi-dimensional mental health symptom checklist that screens for and monitors changes in potential mood and anxiety symptoms.

The 27-item instrument assesses an individual's risk of having depression, anxiety disorder, post-traumatic stress disorder, and bipolar disorder, as well as items for drug and alcohol use and functional impairment. It was developed by a group of doctors and is recognized by NCQA as a pre-validated mental health tool for its Patient Centered Medical Home Recognition Program.

The questionnaire can be filled in online or by smartphone using an app called WhatsMyM3 on iTunes or Android. It calculates the user's M3 Score and, if desired, the results can then be sent to a health professional. The consumer version of My Mood Monitor is called "WhatsMyM3," and the professional version is called "M3 Clinician".

== Validation and psychometrics ==
Effectiveness of the M3 Checklist has been validated against the Mini International Neuropsychiatric Interview (MINI), a standard diagnostic tool, by Gaynes et al. at the University of North Carolina.

Psychometrics of the M3 Checklist
Positive Clinical Dimension	Sensitivity	Specificity
M3 (any condition)	0.83	0.76
Depression	0.84	0.80
Bipolar	0.88	0.70
Anxiety	0.82	0.78
PTSD	0.88	0.76
