= Haima M3 =

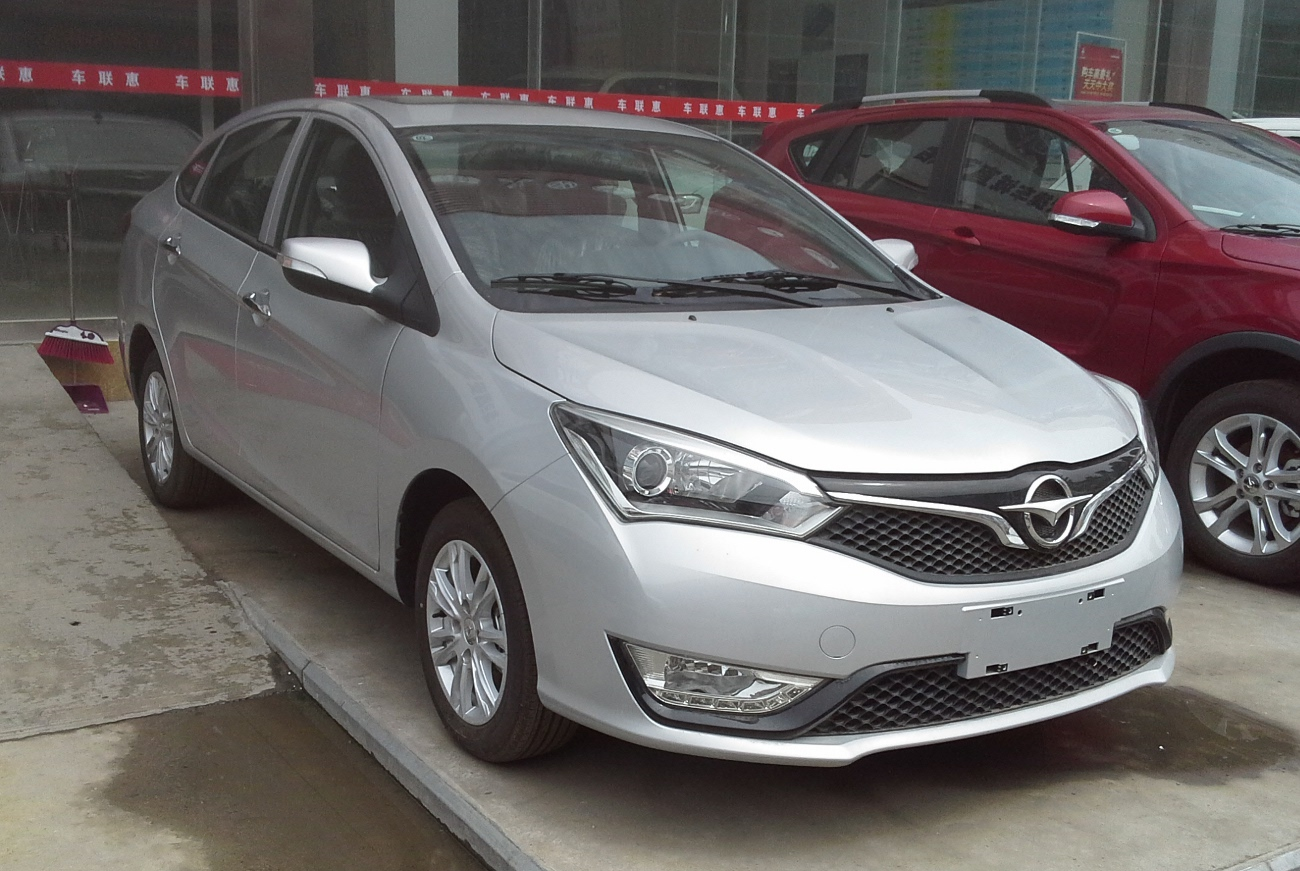

Overview
- Also called: Haima V30 (prototype); Haima @3 EV (electric version)
- Production: 2013 – 2017
- Assembly: Hainan, China

Body and chassis
- Class: Subcompact car (B)
- Body style: 4-door sedan
- Layout: Front-engine, front-wheel-drive

Powertrain
- Engine: 1.5 L HMA GN15-VF turbo I4 (gasoline)
- Transmission: 5/6-speed manual CVT

Dimensions
- Wheelbase: 2,600 mm (102.4 in)
- Length: 4,545 mm (178.9 in)
- Width: 1,737 mm (68.4 in)
- Height: 1,495 mm (58.9 in)
- Curb weight: 1,055 kg (2,325.9 lb)

The Haima M3 is a Subcompact sedan produced by the Chinese automaker Haima.

== Overview ==
The production version of the Haima M3 sedan was launched during the 2013 Shanghai Auto Show, and it was made available to the Chinese car market with prices starting from 59,800 yuan to 89,800 yuan. The Haima M3 was formerly known as the Haima V30 during development phase and the name was later changed to Haima M3 when the prototype debuted on the 2012 Guangzhou Auto Show in November 2012. The Haima M3 is powered by a 1.5 liter DOHC inline-4 engine producing 112hp and 147Nm of torque, mated to a five-speed manual transmission or a 4-speed automatic transmission. Haima claims a 5.9 liter/100 km fuel economy.

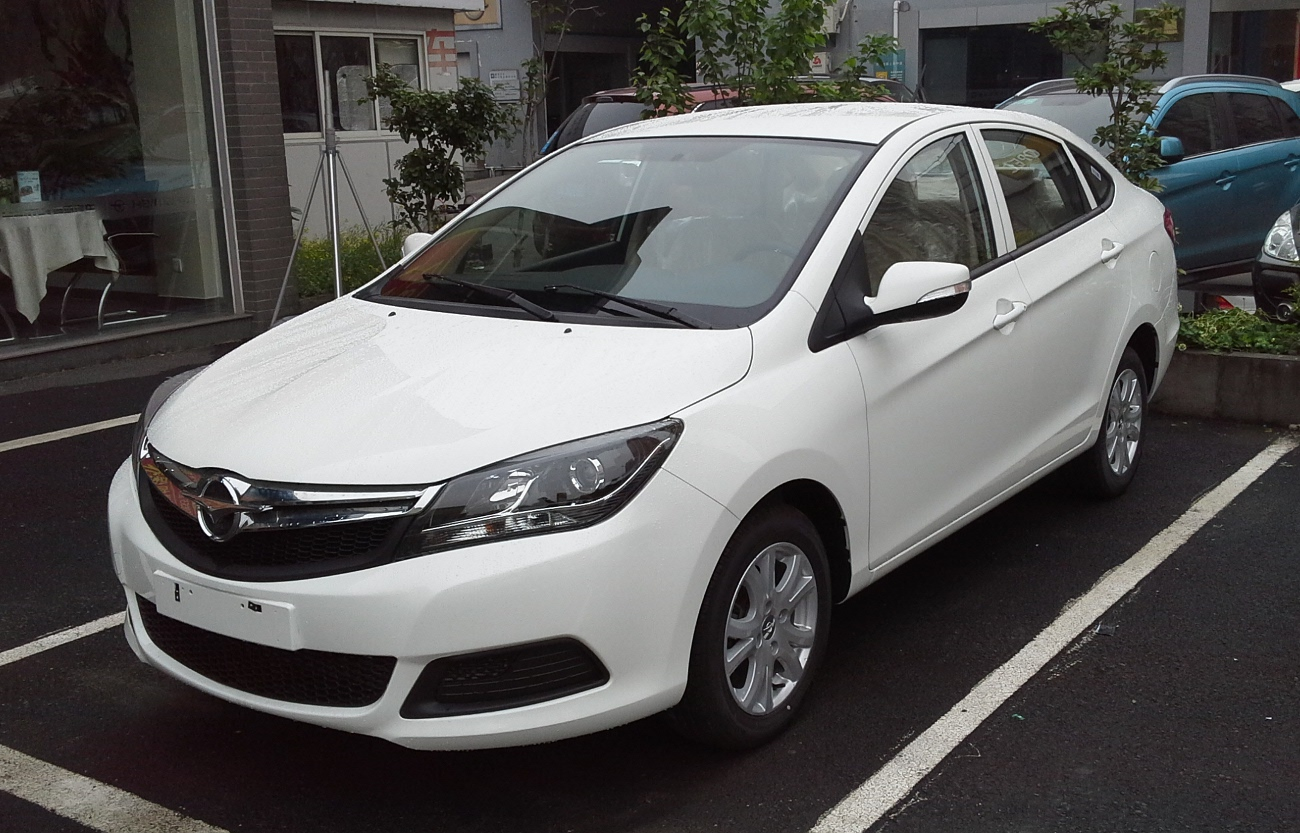
Haima M3 pre-facelift (front)

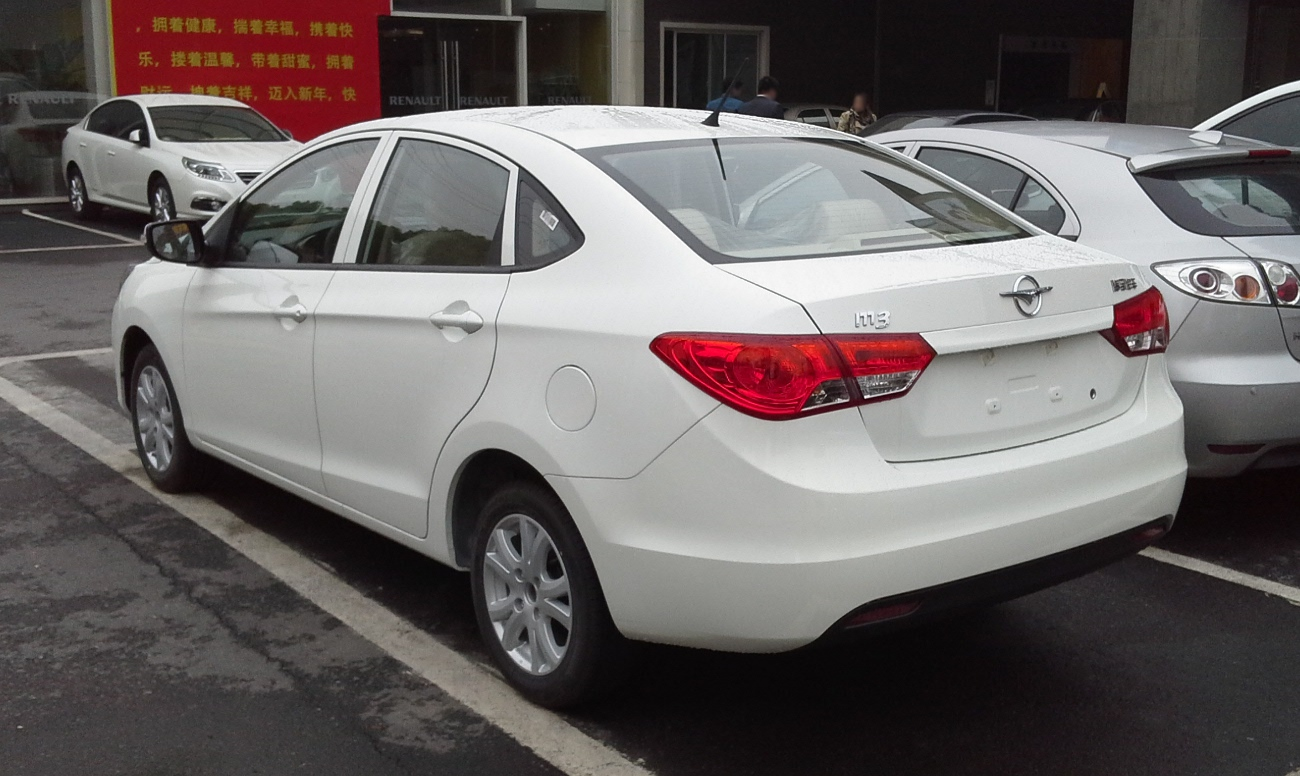
Haima M3 pre-facelift (rear)

=== 2017 facelift ===
For 2017, the exterior and interior of the Haima M3 received design updates (with the front looking like a Opel Astra K and the rear looking like a Toyota Corolla (E170)) with the same 1.5-liter DOHC inline-4 gasoline engine as the powertrain with Variable Valve Timing. As of 2019, the engine of the post-facelift model is mated to a 6-speed continuously variable transmission.

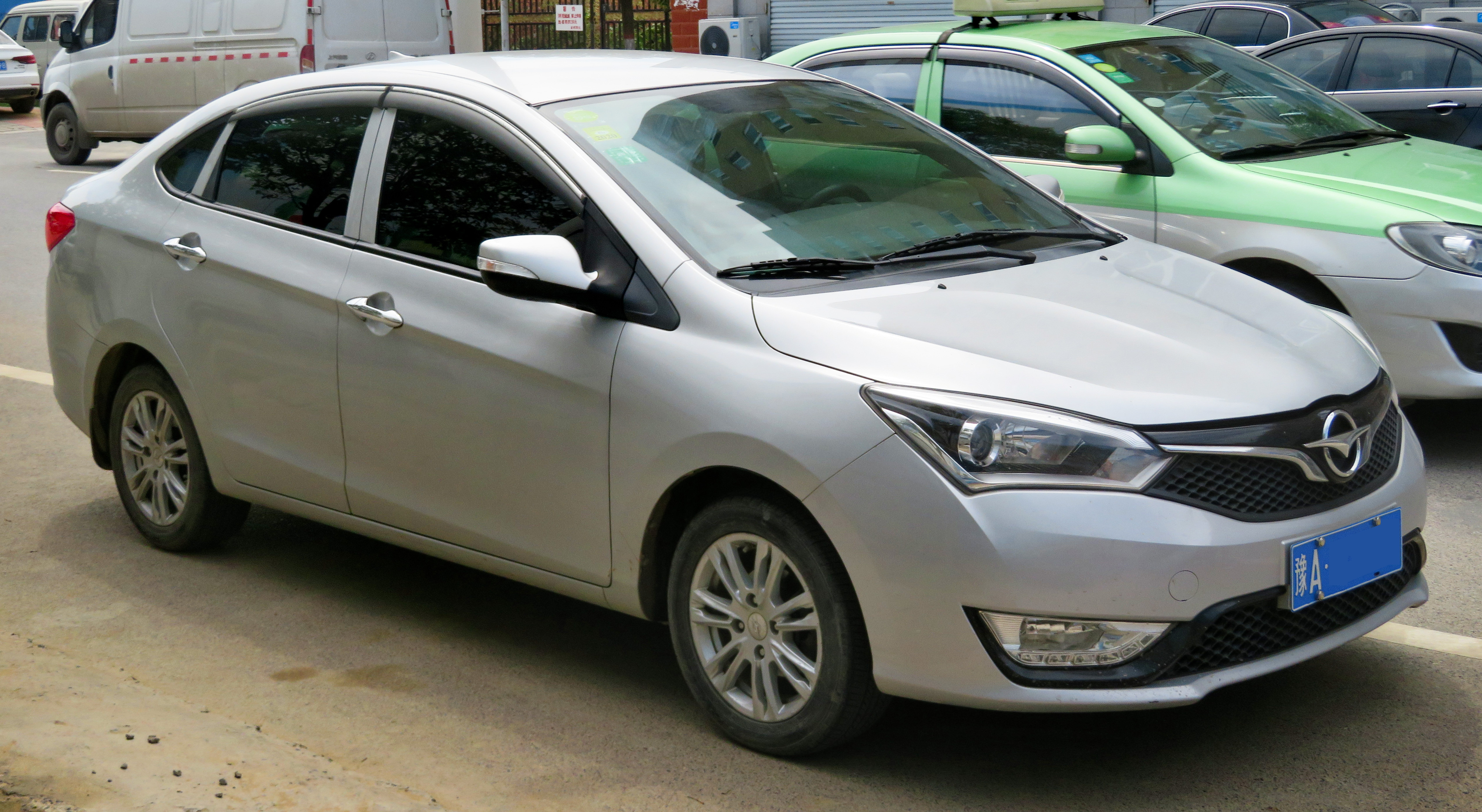
Haima M3 2017 facelift (front)

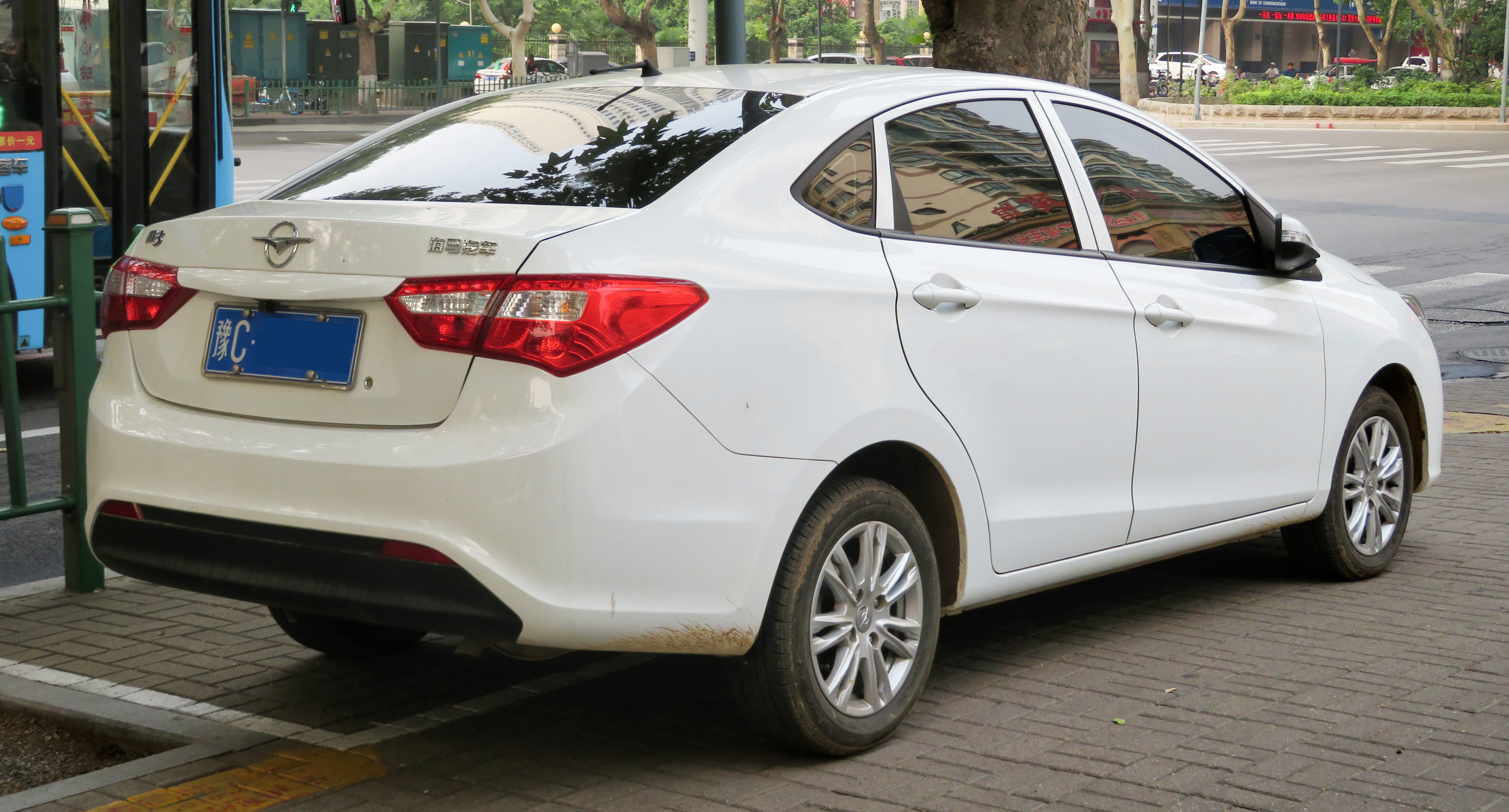
Haima M3 2017 facelift (rear)

== Haima @3 EV ==
The Haima @3 EV is an electric sedan based on the Haima M3 sedan. The @3 was launched in 2016 with a price of 119,800 yuan including subsidies. The Haima @3 EV has an electric motor that produces 95 hp, and a top speed of 120 km/h. Batteries are capable of a 200 kilometer range and charging on 220 V power source takes 7 hours. A facelift version was later introduced with restyled bumpers.
