= MMM =

Mmm or MMM may refer to:

== Organizations ==
- 3M (NYSE: MMM), a US company
- MMM (Ponzi scheme), a Russian company 1989-1994
  - MMM Global, a relaunch of the MMM Ponzi scheme in 2011
- Everybody's Hungary Movement (Hungarian: Mindenki Magyarországa Mozgalom; MMM), a political movement established in 2018
- Maison Margiela, a French luxury fashion house formerly known as Maison Martin Margiela (MMM)
- Mauritian Militant Movement, a political party
- Messner Mountain Museum
- MigratieMuseumMigration, Belgian migration museum
- Morgan-McClure Motorsports, a defunct NASCAR team
- Mysteria Mystica Maxima (M∴M∴M∴), an occult organization
- MMM, a category of Swiss Migros supermarkets

== Media ==
- MuchMoreMusic, a Canadian cable television channel
- McKenna Mendelson Mainline, a Canadian blues quartet
- The Mythical Man-Month (MM-M), a project management book

=== Radio ===
- Triple M (MMM), radio network in Australia
  - Triple M Sydney (2MMM; aka MMM), radio station in Sydney, Australia; the origin of the radio network
- WMMM, callsign MMM in region W
  - WMMM-FM ("105-5 Triple M"), a radio station in Madison, Wisconsin, USA
  - WMMM-AM, former callsign for WSHU (AM), a radio station in Westport, Connecticut, USA
- KMMM, callsign MMM in region K
  - KMMM-AM, an AM radio station in Pratt, Kansas, USA
  - KMMM-FM, former callsign for KHTT, an FM radio station in Tulsa, Oklahoma, USA

== Science ==
- Masticatory muscle myositis; a canine disease of the jaw
- Mesoscale and microscale meteorology, weather systems smaller than synoptic scale
- Moon Mineralogy Mapper, NASA's Moon imaging spectrometer onboard Chandrayaan-1
- Myelofibrosis with myeloid metaplasia, a disease of bone marrow

== Entertainment ==
=== Music ===
- Mamamoo (MMM), a Korean pop group
- Mecki Mark Men, a Swedish progressive rock group
- MMM (Money Making Mitch), an album by Puff Daddy
- Mix Master Mike, DJ
- "MMM", a 2019 single by Peakboy
- "MMM", a 2022 single by Minelli

=== Television ===
- MMM, the production code for the 1972 Doctor Who serial The Curse of Peladon

== Other uses ==
- The number 3000, in Roman numerals
- Marketing mix modeling, a method of statistical analysis
- Order of Military Merit (Canada), a Canadian military honour for merit
- Middlemount Airport, Queensland, Australia, IATA code MMM
- Military Merit Medal (South Africa)
- Mixed-member majoritarian representation

== See also ==
- 3M (disambiguation)
- M3 (disambiguation)
- Triple M (disambiguation)
- Mmmh (disambiguation)
