= M3 (magazine) =

Swedish technology news and media website

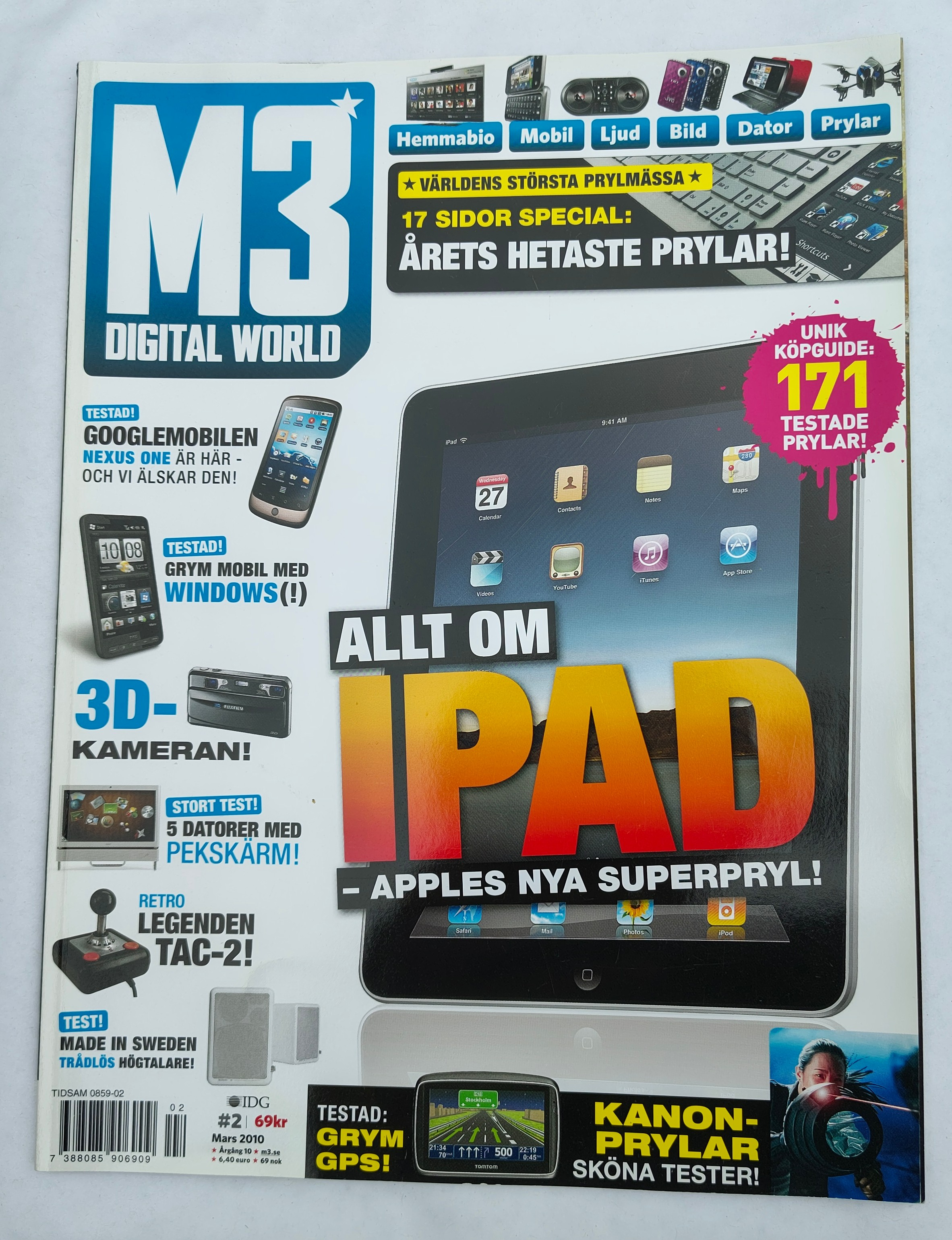
- M3 magazine (2010 March)
- Editor: Mikael Lindkvist
- Categories: Technology journalism
- Founded: 2001; 25 years ago
- Country: Sweden
- Language: Swedish
- Website: m3.se
- ISSN: 1650-5786
- M3 Online
- Website type: Technology News, Science, Entertainment
- Commercial: Yes
- Current status: Online

M3 is a Swedish technology news website, established in 2001 through the merger of two technology magazines, Maxidata and Mobile World. The title was available in print until 2014, after which it transitioned to an online-only format.

M3 was influential in Sweden during the 2000s, when its tests, reviews, and investigations were frequently cited as sources in mainstream media such as Dagens Industri, Svenska Dagbladet, Expressen, Dagens Nyheter, Aftonbladet and others.

M3, together with tech magazines "Computer Sweden", "PC för alla" and "MacWorld", were owned by International Data Group until 2025 when they were sold to private equity firm Regent LP.
