= Military Mapping Maidens =

During World War II the Army Map Service (AMS), a heritage organization of the National Geospatial-Intelligence Agency, was losing a significant amount of its workforce at a time when demand for its products was surging. "Military Mapping Maidens," also known colloquially as "3Ms," stepped in to create maps to aid war efforts.

== Training ==
In 1941, the 77th Congress signed a bill that allocated additional funding to map areas that the Secretary of War deemed “strategic.” Due to inadequate map coverage for the war, some maps of the Pacific were from the 19th century, federal government created training programs to address their cartographic needs.

Starting in 1942 select coeducational and women's colleges established training programs in Military Map Making (3M courses). This program was established as part of the Engineering, Science and Management Wartime Training (ESMWT) program under the United States Office of Education.

Edith Putnam Parker (1886-1961) was put in charge of the 3M program. At the time she was an associate professor of geography at the University of Chicago and had a focus on geographic education. It its first year 200 women completed the program. The 60 hour college course that was part of the 3M program was supplemented at the Army Map Service by a four week in-service training.

One of the colleges that offered the course was Kent State University. Edna Eisen was the instructor for Kent State's mapmaking course and encouraged students like Bea (Shaheen) McPherson to participate in the 3M program. Eisen's work with the program resulted in forty-nine Kent State students sent to the Army Map Service. Twenty-one of those students were still in government service at the end of the war, the highest of any school.

Schools that offered the program included:

Barnard	Hunter	Rochester
Brown	Illinois	Simmons
Bryn Mawr	Kent State	Syracuse
U. of Chicago	Michigan	University of Maine
Columbia	Mt. Holyoke	Wellesley
Cornell	Northwestern	Wisconsin, Madison
Fla. State Coll for Women	Penn State	
Houghton	Radcliffe	

The majority of these schools did not teach cartography prior to the war.

== Impact ==
Women that were part of the 3M program worked up to 70 hours per week over the course of three years and assisted in creating more than 40,000 maps of all types. The maps that were created were hand drawn and required approximately 600 hours of cartographic labor for each new map.

Reference materials included foreign maps, aerial photos, and other information to chart strategic locations, churches, schools, land contours, bodies of water, and roads. Interpretation of aerial images was very important as in many places it was hard to gain intelligence on the ground.

The maps that were created included maps for the D-Day invasion, the Battle of the Bulge and initiatives in and around Fiume, Italy.

At the end of the war women made up 58% of the Army Map Service.
