= JAC Refine M3 =

Compact MPV

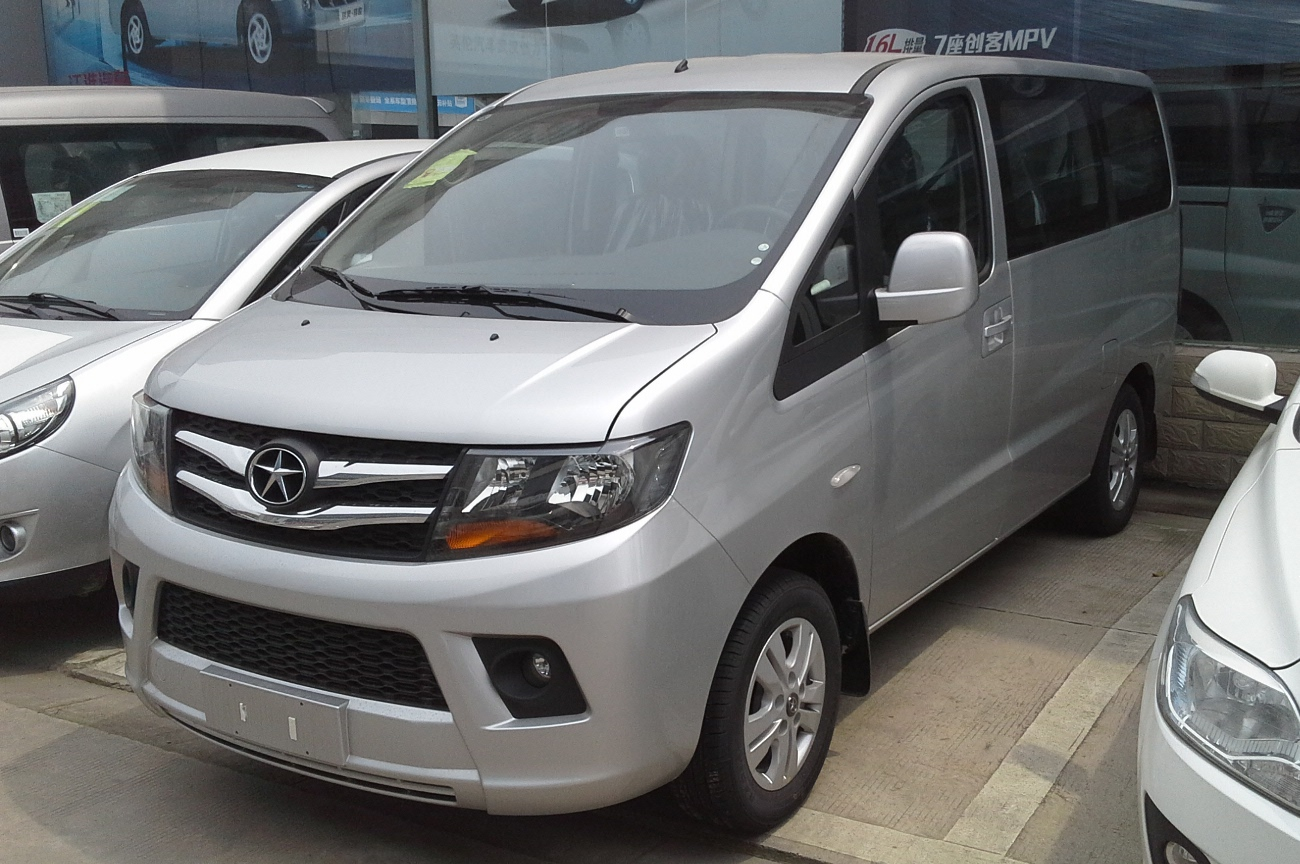
- JAC Refine M3 (pre-facelift)

Overview
- Manufacturer: JAC Group
- Also called: JAC Refine E3 (electric version); JAC Sunray City; Kaiyi V7 (Cowin V7); Sollers SF1 (Russia)
- Production: 2014–present
- Model years: 2015–present
- Assembly: China: Hefei

Body and chassis
- Class: Compact MPV (M)
- Body style: 5-door minivan

Powertrain
- Engine: Petrol: 1.6 L HFC4GB3-3D I4; 2.0 L HFC4GA3-D/HFC4GA3-3D I4; Petrol plug-in hybrid: 2.0 L LJM20A I4
- Electric motor: Permanent magnet synchronous (PHEV)
- Transmission: 5-speed manual DHT automatic (PHEV)
- Battery: 17.5 kWh LFP Gotion (PHEV)
- Electric range: 63 km (39 mi) (PHEV) CLTC

Dimensions
- Wheelbase: 111 in (2,810 mm); 122 in (3,110 mm) (M3L)
- Length: 183 in (4,645 mm); 200–203 in (5,075–5,145 mm) (M3L)
- Width: 69 in (1,740 mm); 69 in (1,765 mm) (M3L)
- Height: 75 in (1,900 mm)

The JAC Refine M3 is a compact MPV produced by JAC Group.

== Overview ==
The Refine M3 was introduced as a near-production concept during the 2014 Beijing Auto Show.

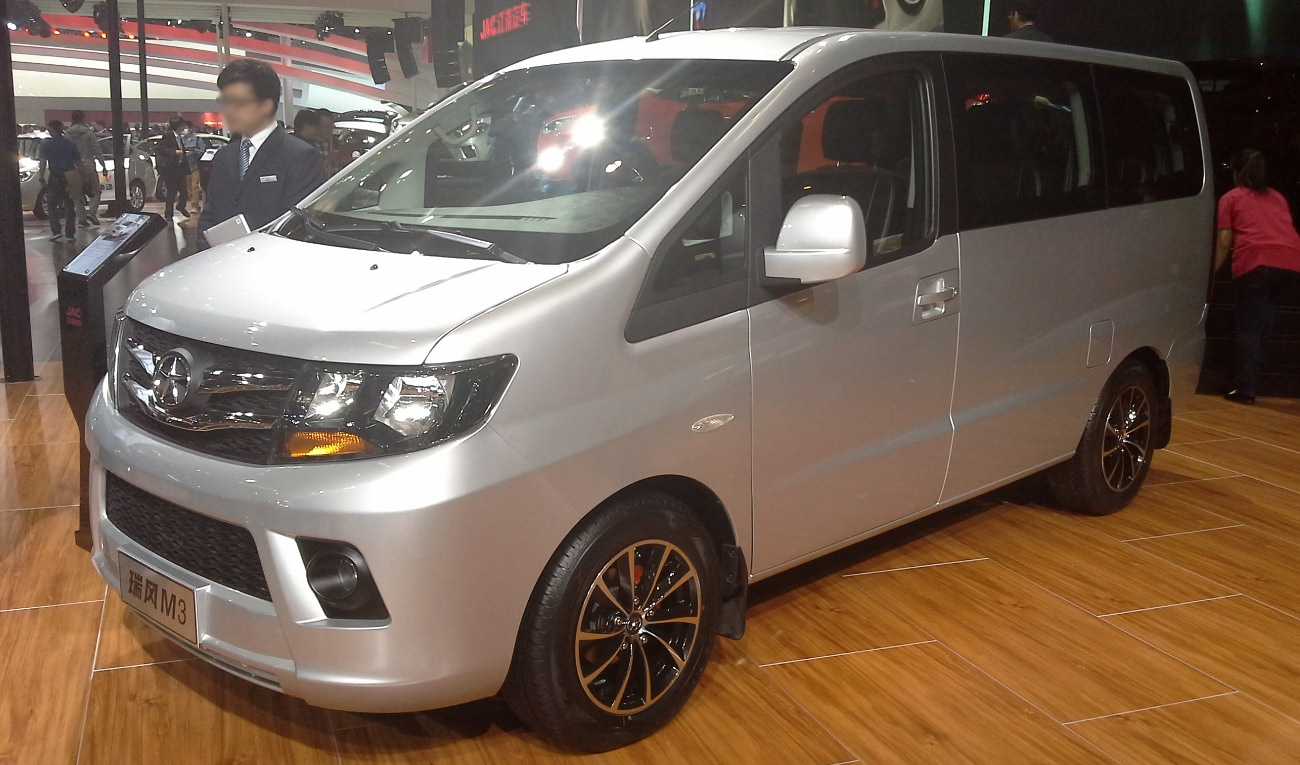
JAC Refine M3 Concept (Auto China 2014)

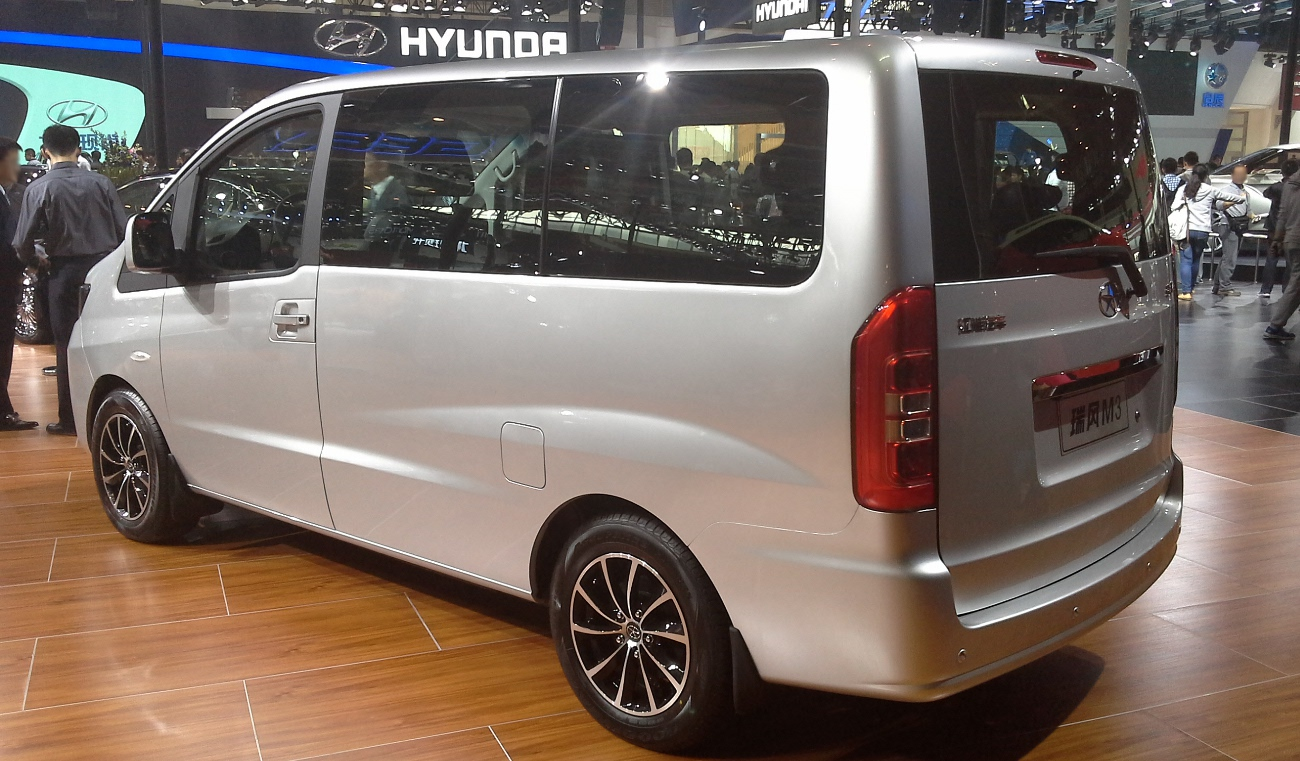
Rear view

The production version was revealed in 2015 positioning above the Refine M2 with prices ranging from 69,800 yuan to 74,800 yuan. At launch, the Refine M3 is powered by a 1.6-liter petrol inline-four engine with 120hp and 150nm mated to a five-speed manual gearbox. A 2.0-liter petrol engine producing 143hp and 180nm was added to the line-up later in 2015. The Refine M3 is controversial when it comes to styling as it heavily resembles the Nissan NV200 from the side profile. A face-lift version was launched later updating the front fascia to be in line with the rest of the Refine MPV products.

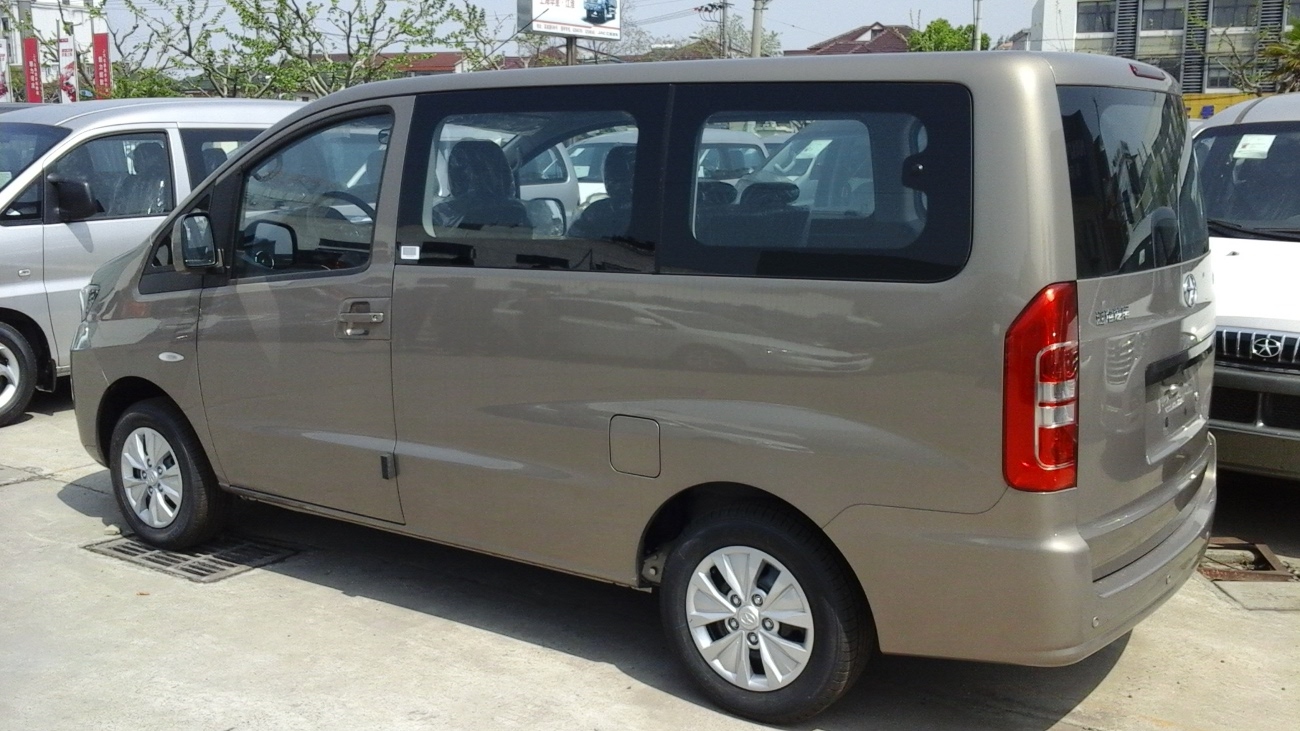
Rear view

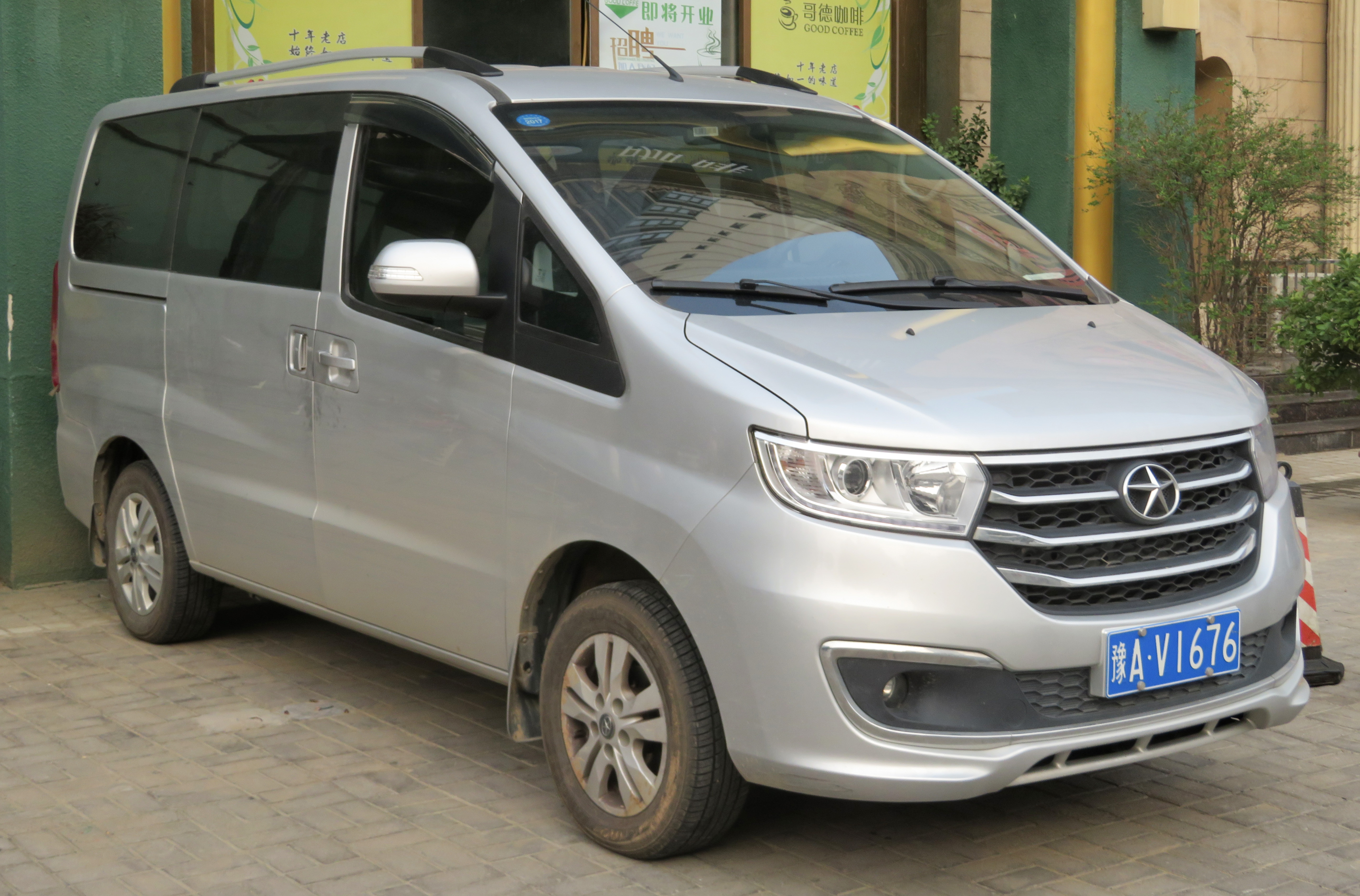
JAC Refine M3 2018 (facelift)

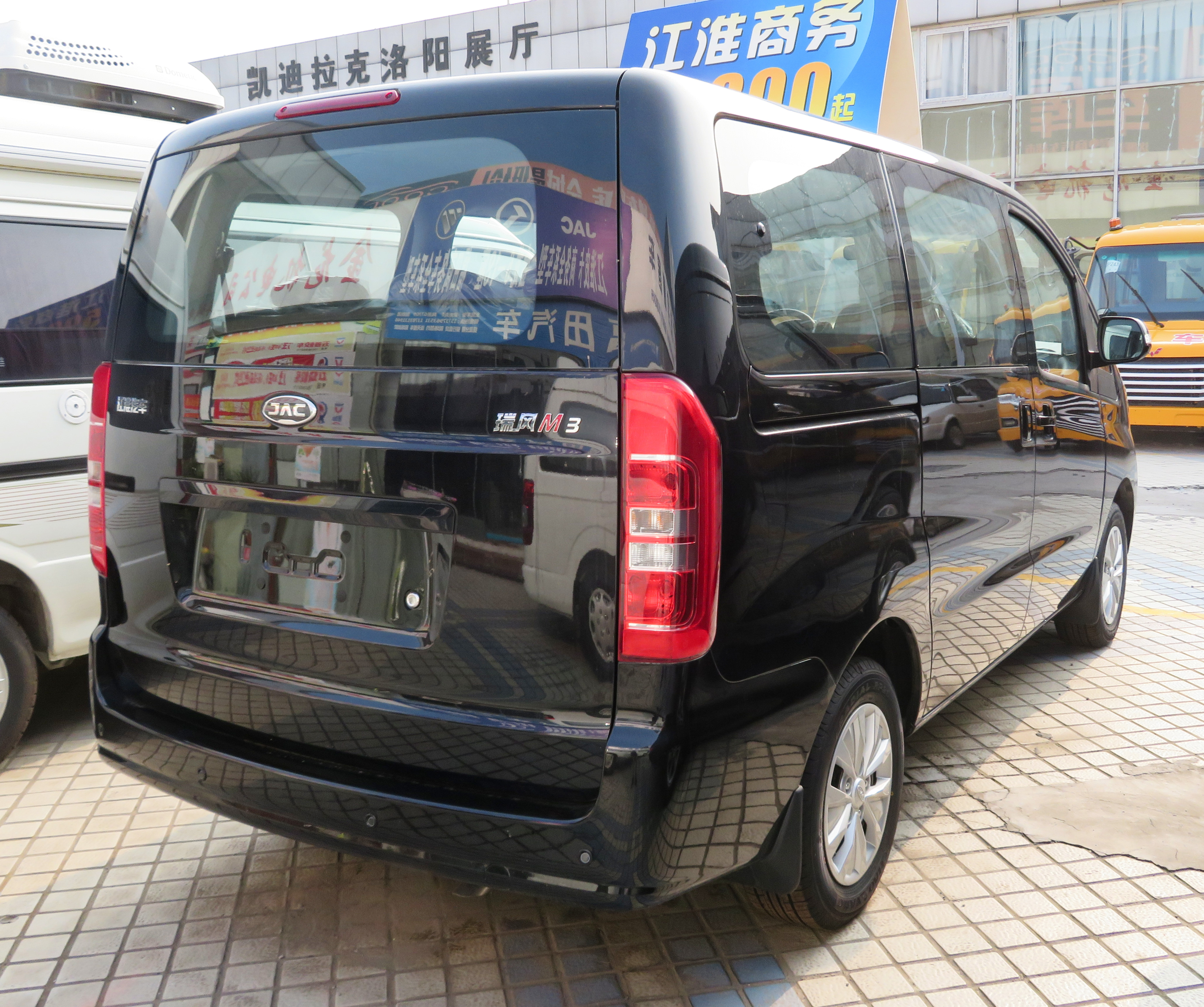
Rear view

== JAC Refine M3L ==
The JAC Motors was officially released as the JAC Refine M3L at the 2019 Chengdu Auto Show. The Refine M3L is a long-wheelbase version of the regular Refine M3. The wheelbase of the Refine M3L is 300mm longer than the standard version Refine M3 while the rear overhand and width was also enlarged making up to a final length of 5075mm to 5145mm, a width of 1765mm, and a wheelbase of 3110mm. The interior space of the Refine M3L is more versatile and support 9-seat layout. Based on market positioning and customer needs, the Refine M3L will continue to launch IKEA, Commercial, and Logistics versions for different target markets. Power of the Refine M3L comes from a LJ4A18Q6 1.8-liter naturally aspirated engine producing 133 ps and a peak torque of 182 Nm. Additionally, the M3L also offers ABS plus EBD, airbags, tire pressure monitoring and warning, and optional body stability systems.

== JAC Refine E3 ==
The JAC Refine E3 is the electric variant of the Refine M3. It is available with either a 41.86kWh or a larger 70.56–78kWh Lithium Iron Phosphate (LFP) battery supporting a CLTC driving Range varying from approximately 252km up to 415km on a single charge. The powertrain is a permanent-magnet synchronous rear electric motor that outputs 130kW (177hp) and 320N·m of torque.

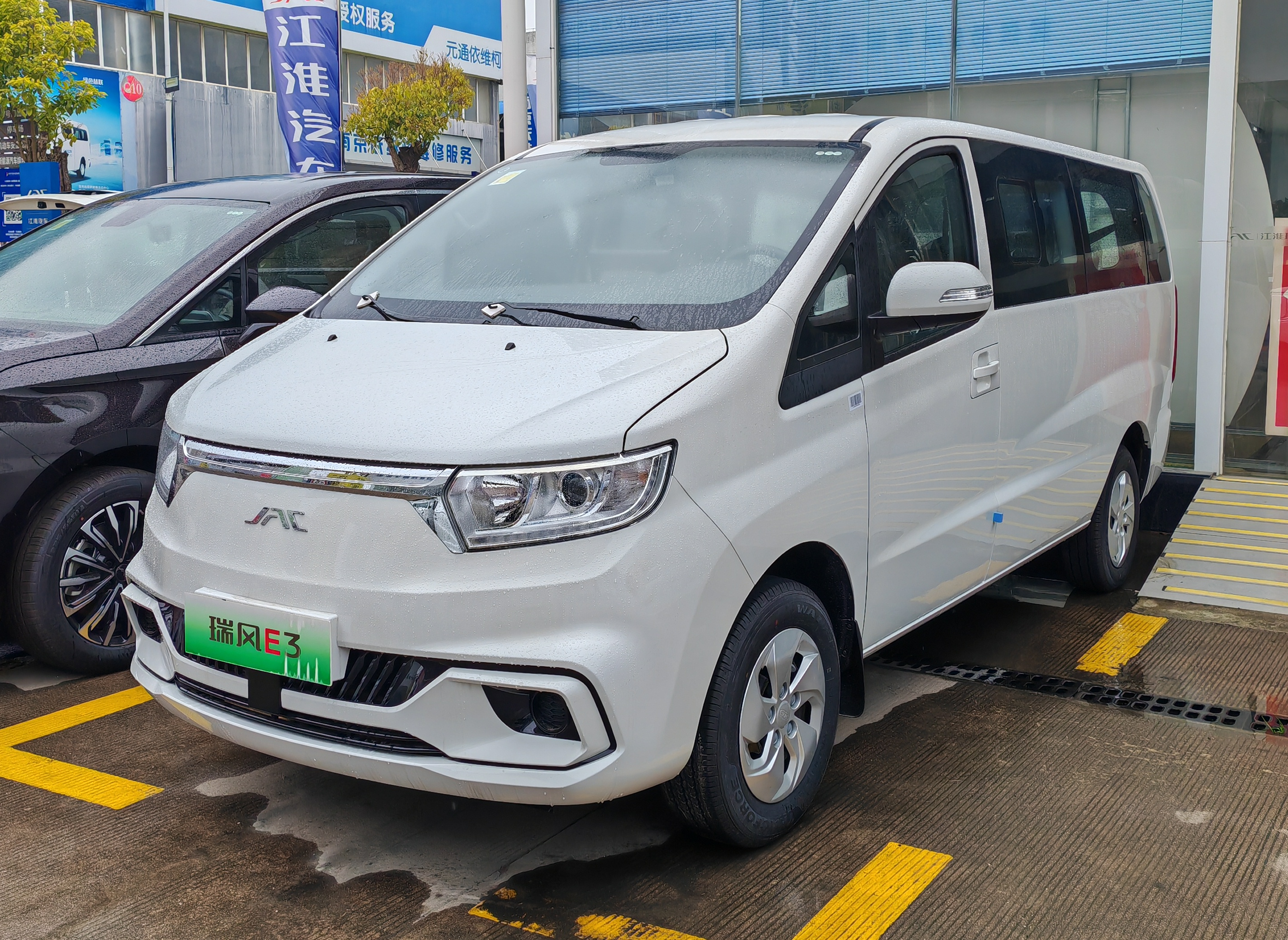
JAC Refine E3

== See also ==
Chinese-made NV200 clones:

- Gonow Xinglang - First Chinese-made NV200 clone in 2013.
- BYD M3 DM - Third Chinese-made NV200 clone in 2014.

Original Japanese-made van:

- Nissan NV200
