= M3 motorway =

M3 motorway may refer to:

- M3 motorway or Riverside Expressway, part of the Pacific Motorway in Brisbane, Queensland, Australia
- M3 motorway (Great Britain), a motorway in England
- M3 motorway (Hungary), a motorway in Hungary
- M3 motorway in the Republic of Ireland, part of the N3 national primary road
- M3 motorway (Northern Ireland), an urban motorway in Belfast, Northern Ireland
- M3 motorway (Pakistan)

== See also ==
- M-3 (Michigan highway), a state highway in the Detroit metropolitan area
- M3 (Cape Town), an expressway in Cape Town, South Africa
- M3 highway (Russia), another name for the Ukraine Highway in Russia
- Eastern Freeway (Melbourne) or EastLink (Melbourne) in Victoria, Australia, both of which are numbered as M3
