= JAC Refine M2 =

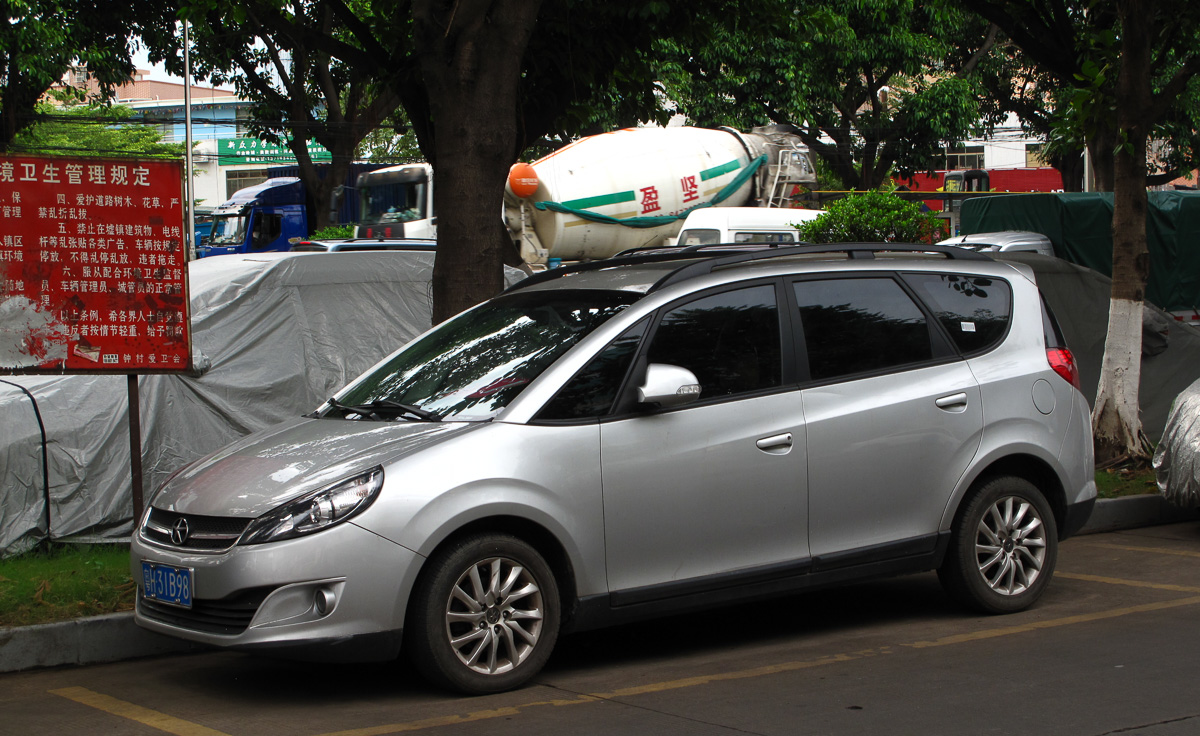

Overview
- Manufacturer: JAC Motors
- Also called: JAC Heyue RS; JAC J6
- Production: 2011–2018

Body and chassis
- Body style: 5-door minivan

Powertrain
- Engine: 1.5L I4; 1.8L I4
- Transmission: 4-speed automatic 5-speed manual

Dimensions
- Wheelbase: 107 in (2,710 mm)
- Length: 179 in (4,550 mm)
- Width: 70 in (1,775 mm)
- Height: 63 in (1,600 mm)

The JAC Refine M2 is a compact MPV produced by JAC. Previously named the JAC Heyue RS, the product was moved from the Heyue series to the newly established Refine series just like many of the other products in the Refine series.

== History ==
The original JAC Heyue RS was revealed in 2011 with prices ranging from 72,800 yuan to 93,800 yuan. Later a facelift was revealed in 2012 significantly changing the front and rear.

=== Powertrain ===
The standard Heyue compact MPV is powered by a 1.5 liter engine, while the Heyue RS is powered by a 1.8 liter engine with 105kW and 165 nm.

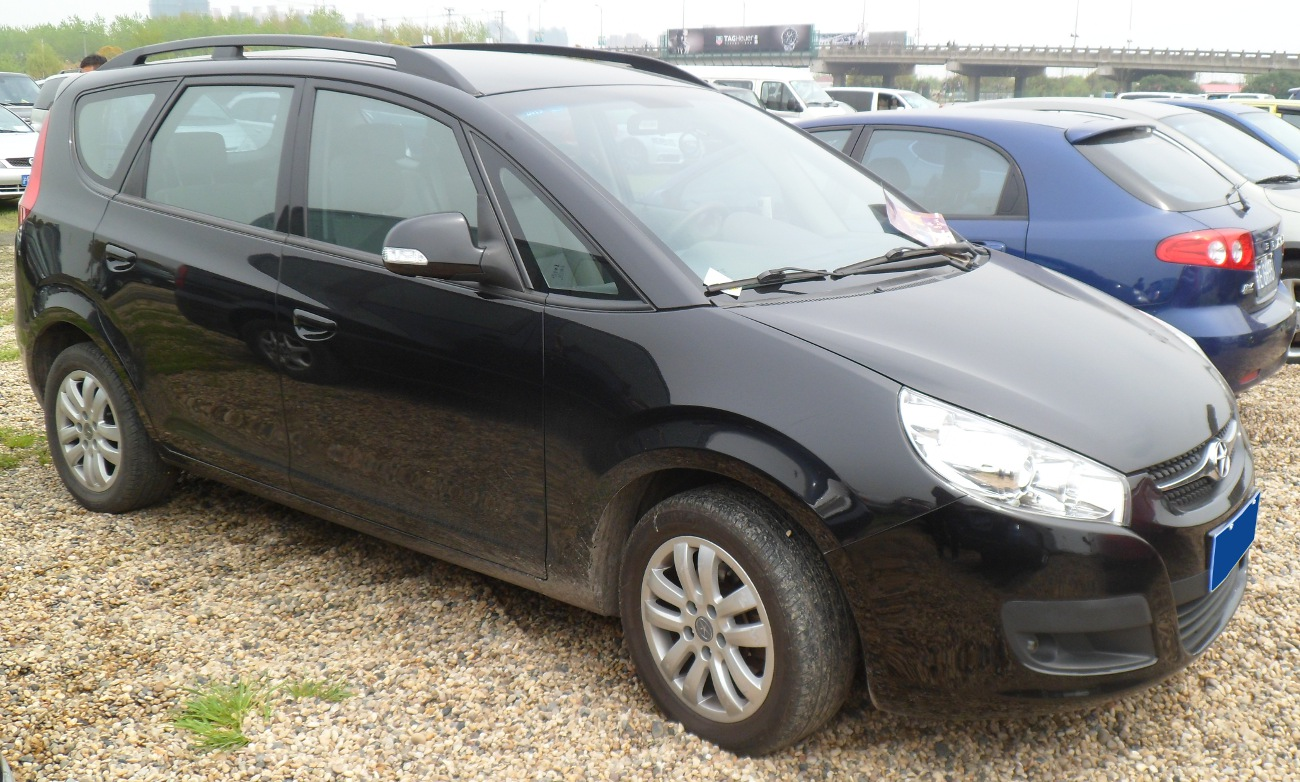
Heyue RS pre-facelift front

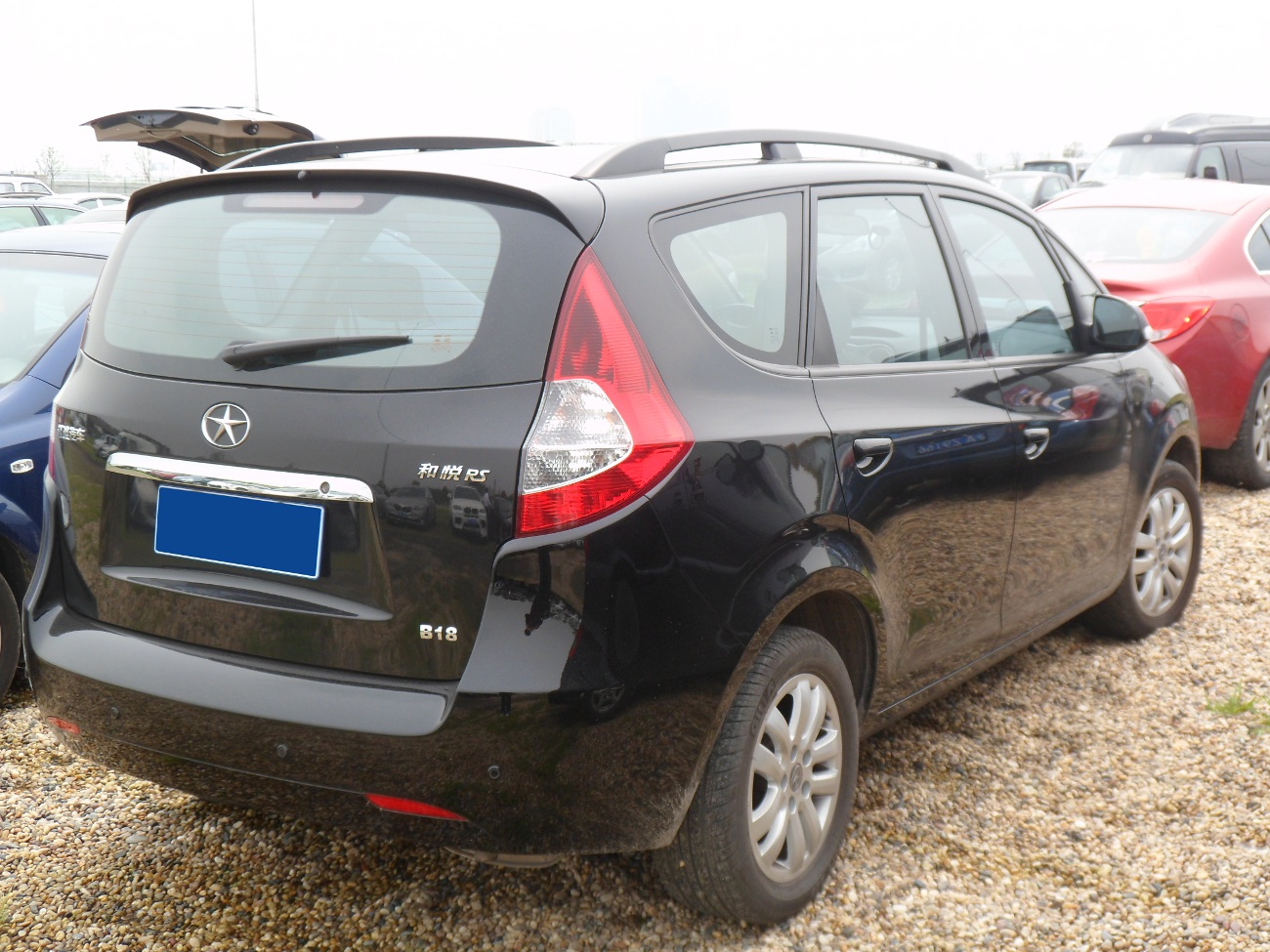
Heyue RS pre-facelift rear

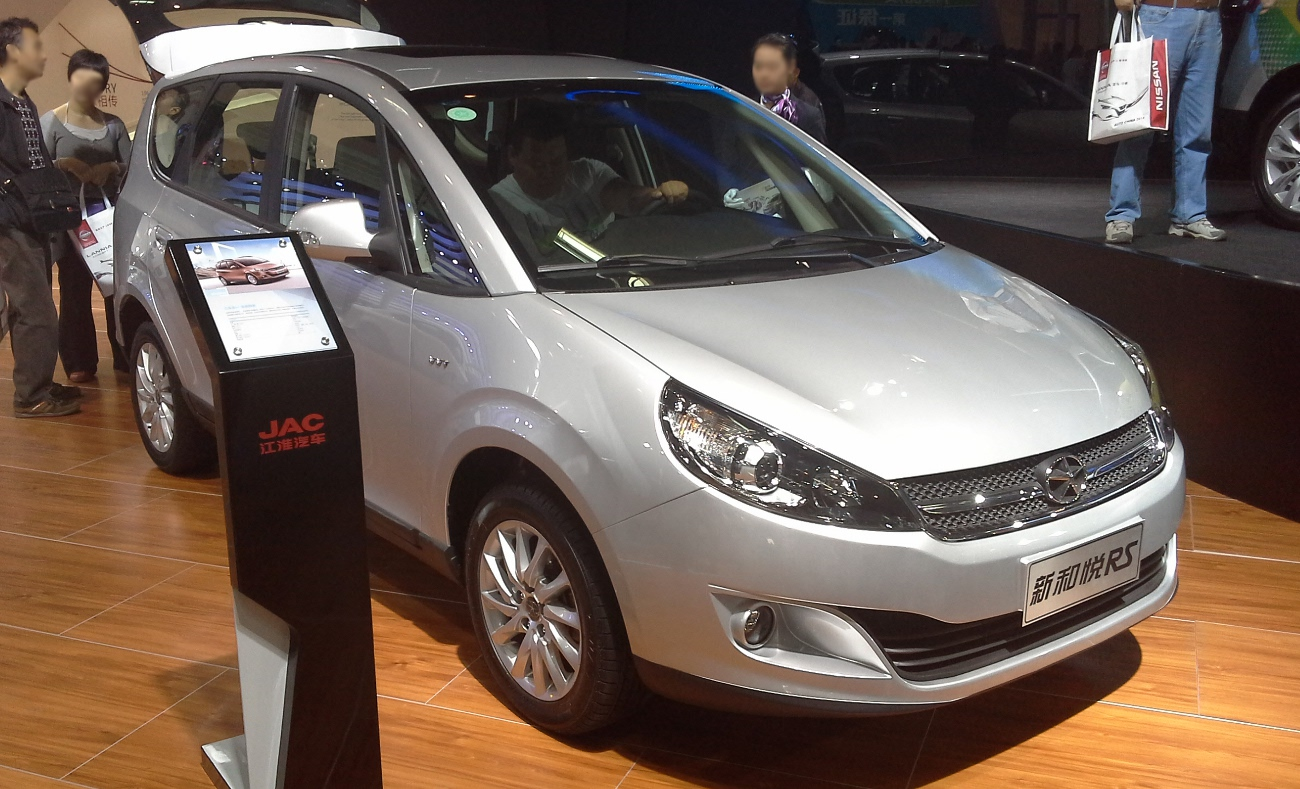
Refine M2 (Heyue RS facelift) front

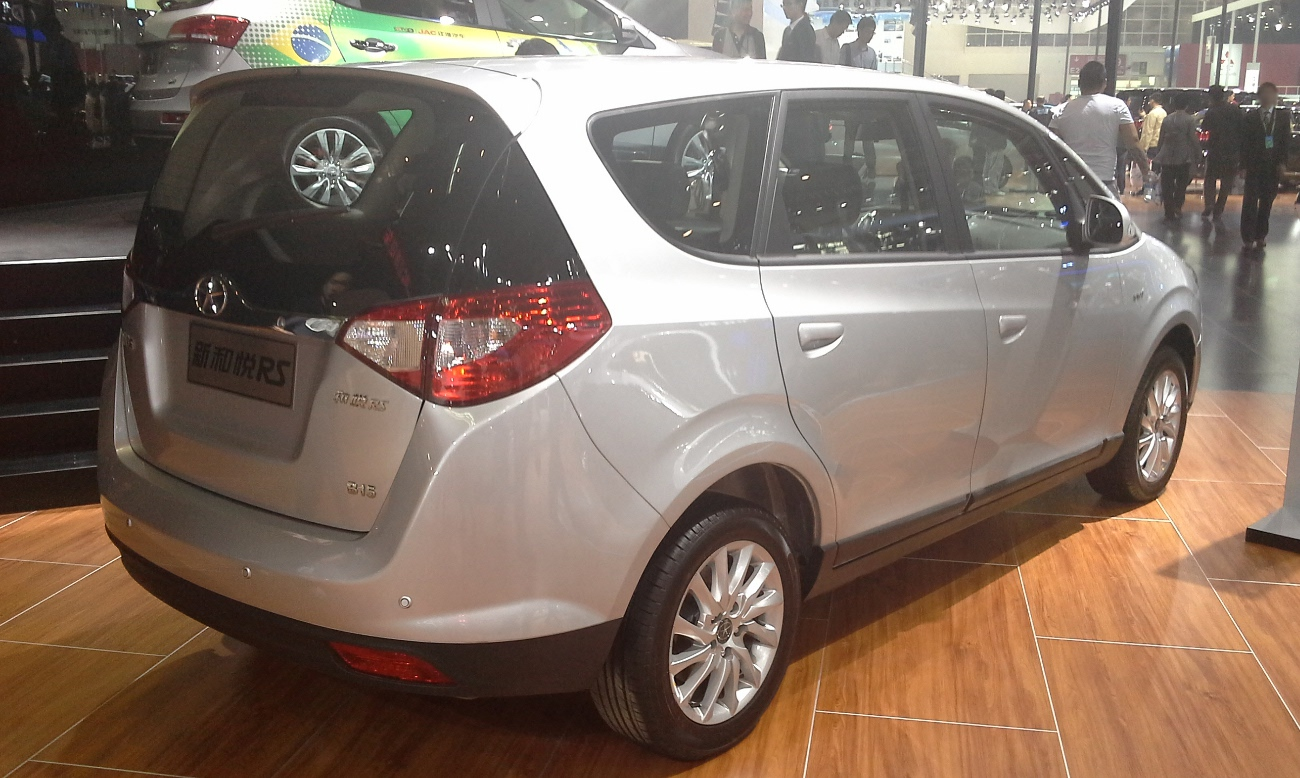
Refine M2 (Heyue RS facelift) rear

== Sales ==
Year	Brazil
2011	2,479
2012	2,694
2013	1,471
2014	871
2015	291
2016	58
2017	32
2018	7
