= Izh 2126 =

Izh 2126 "Oda"
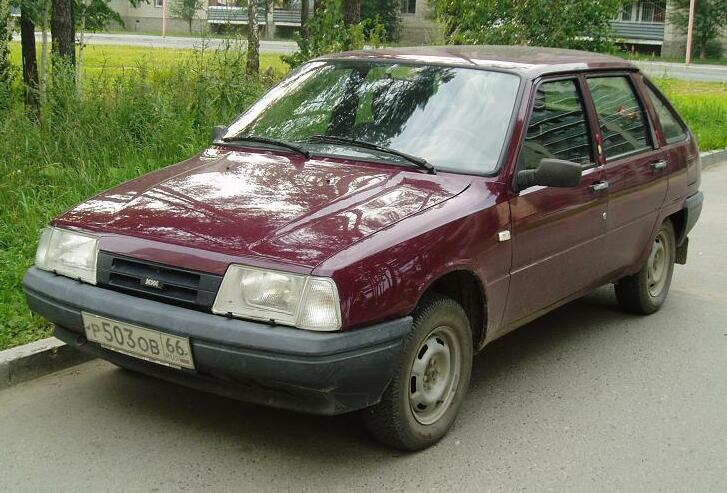

Overview
- Manufacturer: IZh
- Also called: Lada Oda
- Production: 1990–2005
- Assembly: Soviet Union/Russia: Izhevsk

Body and chassis
- Class: Compact car
- Body style: 5-door hatchback (2126 Oda); 5-door station wagon (21261 Fabula); 2-door pick-up (27171); 3-door panel van (2717 Kombi)
- Layout: Front-engine, rear-wheel drive / four-wheel drive (Izh-2116 4x4)
- Related: Lada Samara; Moskvitch Aleko

Powertrain
- Engine: 1.6L 1,568 cc (VAZ-2106); 1.7L 1,699 cc (UZAM-3317); 1.9L 1,945 cc (UZAM-3320)

Chronology
- Predecessor: Izh 2125

The Izh 2126, also known as the "Oda" (Russian: Ода, for ode), is a compact hatchback produced by the Soviet automotive maker IZh (later Russian "OAO Izhmash", and eventually "IzhAuto") between 1990 and 2005.

== History ==
The Oda was designed to serve as a practical replacement to the 1982 Izh 2125 Kombi, and was the last of the Izhevsk-designed vehicles. A pick-up truck/panel van variant, known as Izh 2717, was also produced from 1991 to 2005. The first prototype appeared in 1977, but production was delayed for several years.

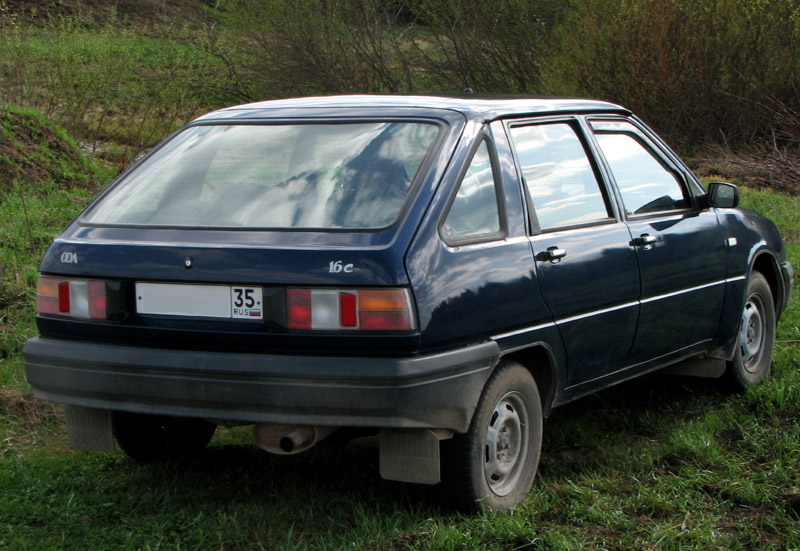
Rear view

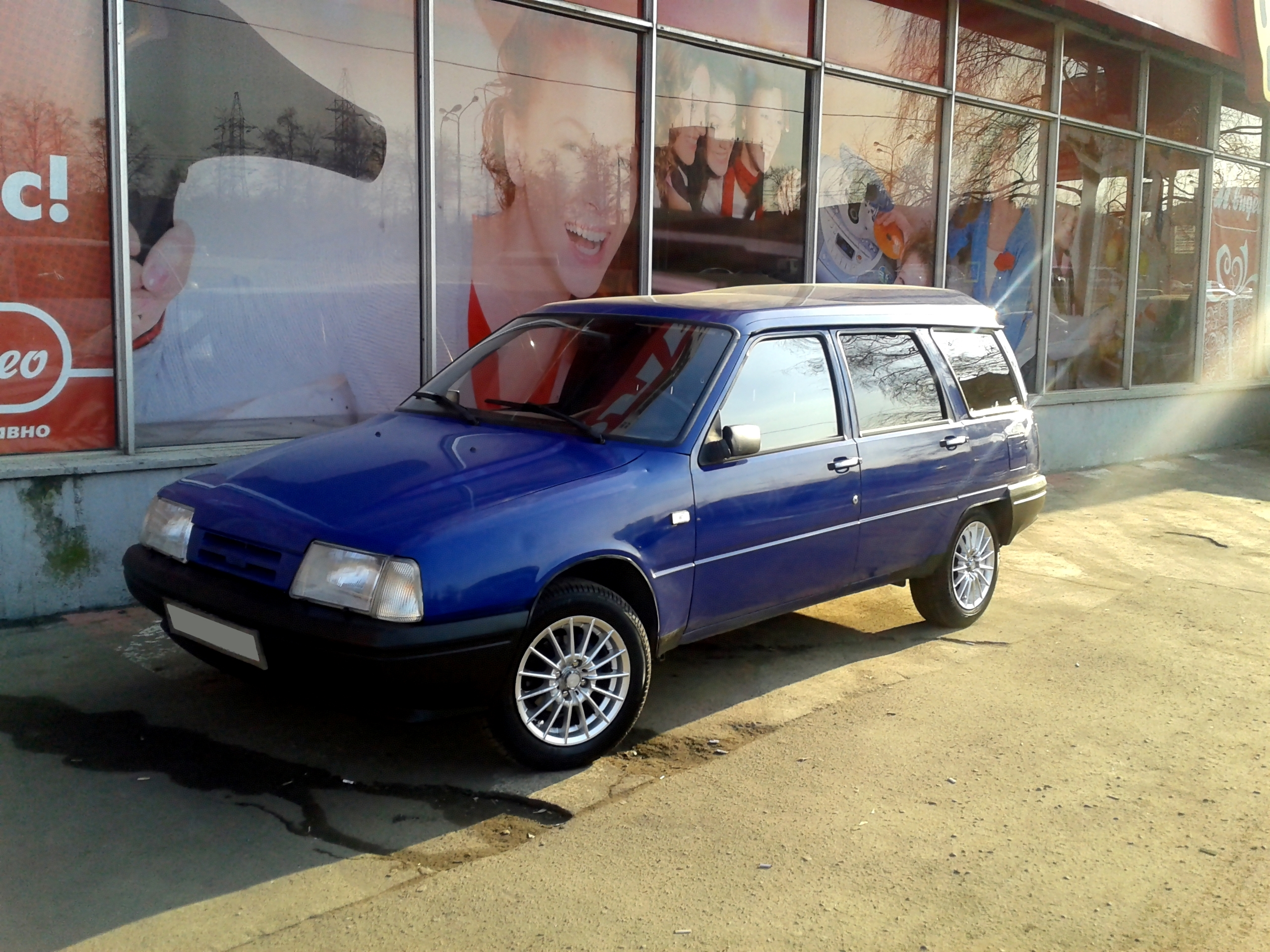
IZH-21261

Early prototypes, conceived in the late 1980s, implemented the base of Moskvitch Aleko, with notable borrowings in the body style, while the powertrain featured an upgraded 2125 Kombi engine and transmission. As planned, the Izh Oda entered production in late 1991 alongside the Kombi. Also like the Kombi, it was also planned for export release, but this never occurred.

In the wake of the dissolution of the USSR, AZLK (effectively IZH's parent factory at the time) began losing significant revenue before being privatised, resulting in the decision for IZH to convert the production of about half its lines to other industries (such as the production of firearms) in order to keep its automotive market running. As such, the early years of production saw limited numbers, with roughly 5,000 Izh 2126 models released between 1992 and 1995.

Starting 1996, IZH dropped the Moskvitch brand and merged with AutoVAZ, forming the "IzhAuto" company. The merger allowed the Oda to be updated with VAZ-derived features, such as the Lada 110's interior design and front-wheel drive, as well as the Samara's 2106 engine. This led to a boost in consumer demand, and in 1997, all of the previous Moskvitch-based models were discontinued, while the main line switched to production of both the 2126 and the 2717 only.

The best selling years of this model were from 1998 to 2002, as the cost of foreign vehicles was still prohibitively expensive to the average Russian consumer, and many domestically produced vehicles in the economy car class (such as Lada Sputnik) were seen as outdated or lacking in features for their cost. The Oda also briefly sold in Kazakhstan, Ukraine and Belarus around 2003, which was a promising future for both IzhAuto's models.

In early 2005, the Russian government overtook the country's part in the European emission standards, for which other Russian car manufacturers redesigned their vehicles. IzhAuto, however, was lacking in available funding to participate in the program, which forced the company to discontinue all of its models. Due to their financial circumstances, updating the designs of their models to meet the new Russian emission standards was not possible. The last Odas were completed in September of the same year.

Starting in 2008, parts of former Izh 2126/2717 production lines have been readapted for Lada Priora hatchback production. In 2014, most of the production plant has undergone major reconstruction to also accept the assembly of the hatchback variant of Lada Granta, as well as upcoming Lada XRAY and Lada Vesta starting 2016.

In 2001 the aging car, with its design dating back to 1977, was awarded zero stars out of a possible four by the Russian ARCAP safety assessment program.

== Production ==
A total of 230.781 vehicle was produced at the Izh plant:

- Izh 2126 Oda (1990–2005): 141.510 units
- Izh 27171 pick-up (1995–2005): 3695 units
- Izh 2117 Kombi (1998–2005): 73.442 units
- Izh 21261 Fabula (2003–2005): 12.134 units
