= Moskvitch 410 =

Soviet sedan car (1957–1961)

Moskvitch 410/411
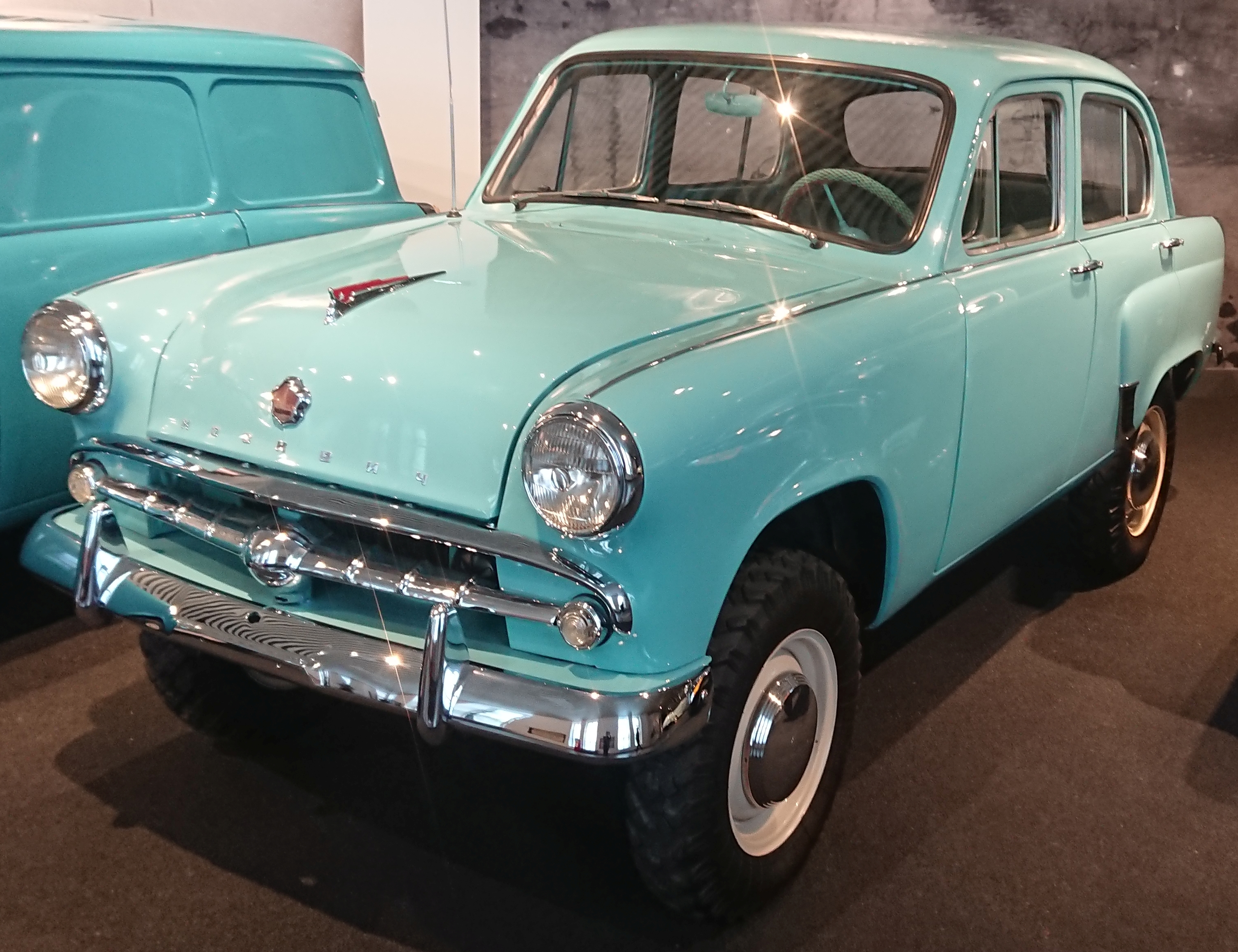

Overview
- Manufacturer: Moskvitch
- Production: 1957–1958 (410); 1959–1961 (411); 9095 produced
- Assembly: Moscow, USSR

Body and chassis
- Class: Small family car
- Body style: 4-door sedan (410); 4-door station wagon (411)
- Layout: F4 layout
- Related: Moskvitch 402

Powertrain
- Engine: 1.2L MZMA-402 I4 (1957); 1.3L MZMA-407 I4 (1958–1961)
- Transmission: 3-speed manual + 2-speed rear gearbox (1957–1960); 4-speed manual + 2-speed rear gearbox (1960–1961)

The Moskvitch 410 is a limited production car made by Soviet manufacturer MZMA from 1957 to 1961. Initially conceived as an economical and comfortable means of transport for agricultural machines' repairing teams, the 410 presented itself as a four wheel drive version of the Moskvitch 402 with a more powerful engine and higher ground clearance. In 1958, however, MZMA produced an upgraded station wagon variant on the same wheelbase, called Moskvitch 411. In total, only 7580 of model 410 and 1515 of model 411 were made.

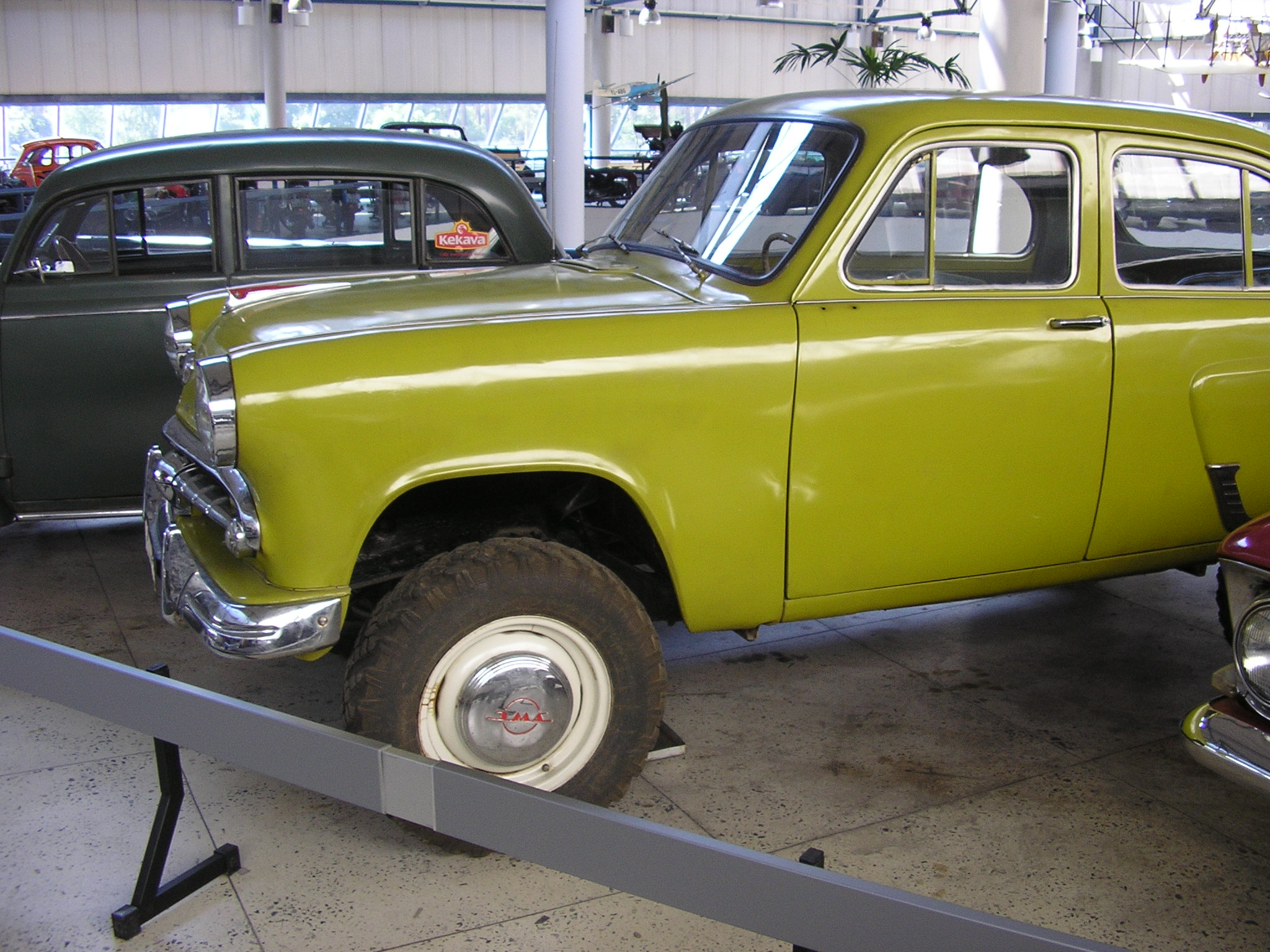
1958 Moskvich 410N at Riga Motor Museum.

The 410 was powered by a 35 hp (26 kW) engine, but in 1958 upgraded to the 410N (in Russian: 410Н), fitted with a more modern 45 hp (34 kW) unit, from Moskvitch 407. The 411, as well as its three-door variant 431, both featured 60 hp (45 kW) engines and a weight increase to accommodate the C-segment. The production of both cars ceased in late 1961 as MZMA was aiming to adapt its main production of Moskvitch 407 for upscale market.

The ground clearance was 220 mm (8.7 in) under axles and 430 mm under a floor, it could cross water up to 0.3 metres (11.8 in) deep, and in first gear it could climb 33 degrees. The early version (1957-1959) had a 3-speed manual + 2-speed auxiliary gearbox which in 1960 was replaced by a 4-speed manual + 2 speed auxiliary gearbox. The top speed was 85 km/h (53 mph).

== Models ==
- Moskvitch 410 - Original series with flathead engine, produced 1957 to 1958.
- Moskvitch 410N - Upgraded version of 410 with OHV engine, produced 1958 to 1961.
- Moskvitch 411 - Station wagon (estate) version of 410, produced 1958 to 1961.
- Moskvitch 431 - Three-door station wagon prototype.
