= Moskvitch 402 =

Soviet compact car (1956–1965)

Moskvitch 402/403/407
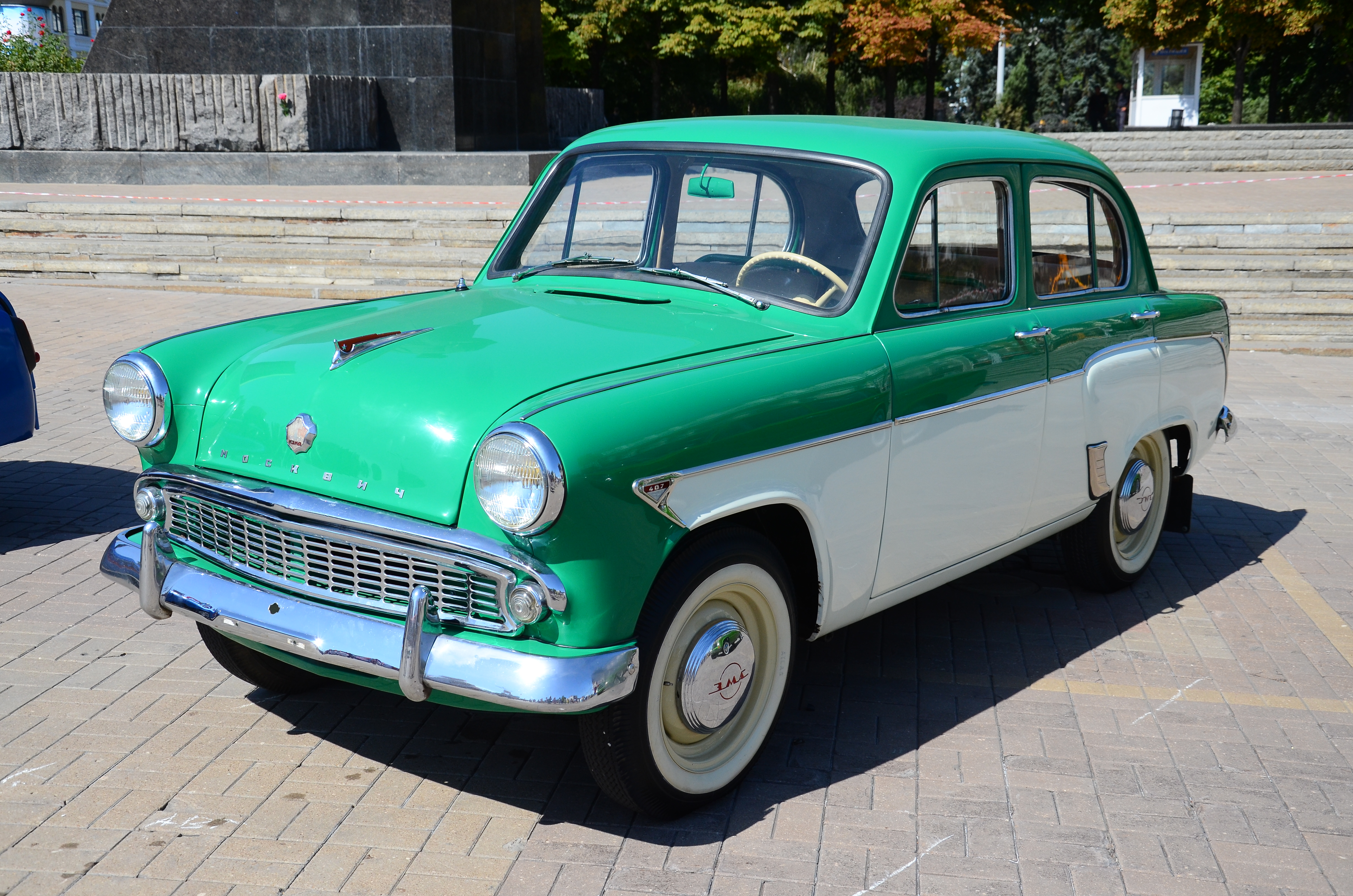

Overview
- Manufacturer: MZMA
- Production: 1956–1965

Body and chassis
- Class: Small family car (C)
- Body style: 4-door sedan; 5-door estate; 3-door sedan delivery
- Layout: FR layout
- Related: Moskvitch 410

Powertrain
- Engine: 1.2L MZMA-402 I4 (402); 1.3L MZMA-407 I4 (403 and 407)
- Transmission: 3-speed manual (1956–1960); 4-speed manual (1960–1965)

Dimensions
- Wheelbase: 2,370 mm (93.3 in)
- Length: 4,055 mm (159.6 in)
- Width: 1,540 mm (60.6 in)
- Curb weight: 910 kg (2,006 lb)

Chronology
- Predecessor: Moskvitch 400-420
- Successor: Moskvitch 408 (for 402/407); Moskvitch 412 (for 403)

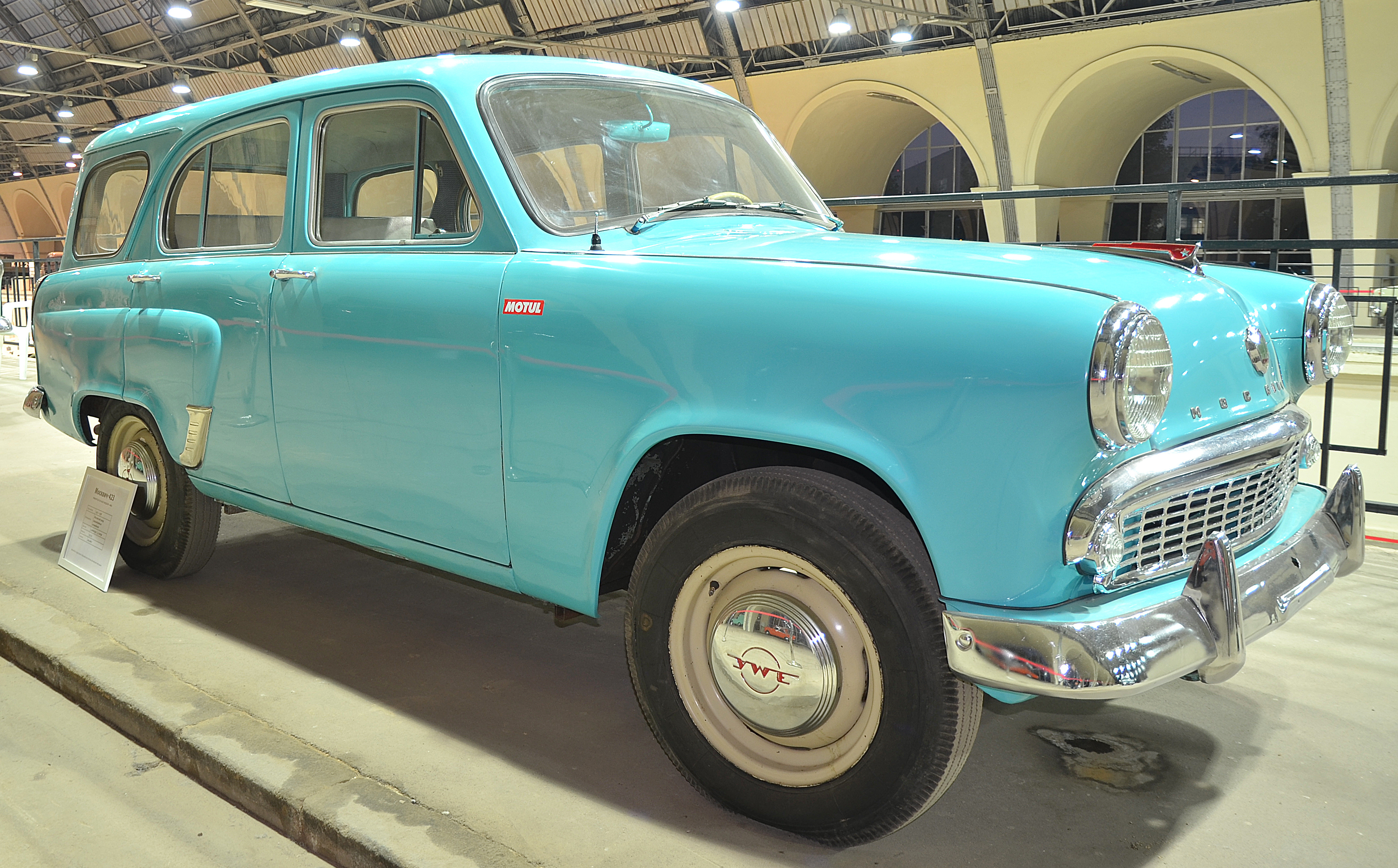
Moskvitch-423

The Moskvitch 402 is a compact car manufactured by the former Soviet automobile maker MZMA, first time introduced in 1956 as a second generation of the Moskvitch series. In comparison with its predecessor, the Moskvitch-401, the M-402 model featured many improvements which included independent suspension with double wishbones, telescopic shock absorbers, 12-volt electrics, more solid and comfortable car body, more modern trunk, heater, standard car radio, wider viewing range for the driver, etc.

== Design ==
The styling of the Moskvitch-402 followed the fashion set by similar-sized cars of its time such as the Hillman Minx, FIAT 1100, Ford Prefect 100E, Jowett Javelin, and Ford Consul Mk1, as well as by the larger GAZ-21 Volga, whose designers took part in the creation of this car. The M-402 was the first Moskvitch designed in the Soviet Union and not based on any foreign model. It utilized a 35 hp (26 kW; 35 PS) 1,222 cc (74.6 cu in) inline four-cylinder flathead engine derived from the 1,074 cc (65.5 cu in) of its predecessors. The top speed was 88–90 kilometres per hour (55–56 mph), a slight increase over the M-401 series, mostly due to considerable reductions in body weight; it could achieve 9 L/100 km (26 mpg_{‑US}; 31 mpg_{‑imp}). In 1958, among other changes, the engine was replaced with MZMA's OHV development, which allowed the car to obtain a maximum speed increase up to 115 kilometres per hour (71 mph) and significantly reduced the level of noise. At 4,055 mm (159.6 in) overall, it was 200 mm (7.9 in) longer than the 401. Though the gearchange had moved to the steering column, the gearbox was the same three-speed manual. Electrics changed from six volt to twelve, a change already being made in the United States. Radio, cigarette lighter, and demister were standard, at a time when the demister was not so in the United Kingdom.

The estate (402-423) appeared in 1957, with folding rear seats and a 250 kg (550 lb) payload. Proposed three-door and sedan delivery models were not produced.

Exported to several Western countries, the M-402 in Norway had an advantage over the Ford Anglia or Prefect, being both more available and less subject to import duty.

Limited production of four-wheel drive variants of the M-402 (the M-410 saloon) was built in 1957–1958, using transfer case and axles of the GAZ-69 and Pobeda steering. Its performance was good: ground clearance was the same as that of the GAZ-69, 220 mm (8.7 in); it could cross water 300 mm (12 in) deep; climb a 33° slope; and reach 56 kilometres per hour (35 mph).

The final Moskvitch-402 was produced in July 1957; there were 94,080 in all (including 18,019 for export).

== M-407 ==
With the new M-407-series 45 hp (34 kW; 46 PS) 1,358 cc (82.9 cu in) overhead valve engine, in 1958, the M-402 became the Moskvitch-407. A four-speed transmission with synchromesh appeared in December 1959, in place of the three-speed.

Also, there was a more powerful version of 407, delivering 67 hp, that could reach up to 145 km/h, reaching 100 km/h in about 19 seconds. This model was only for the soviet Police and KGB, not for sales to public. These performances were about the same with the M-412, launched about 8 years later. Some were sold to public when withdrawn from regular Police service.

The M-407 was offered as an estate (407-423N), delivery (407-430), medical team model (407B), and taxi (407T). The delivery simply had the rear windows of the estate not cut out and the rear doors welded shut; it was only available to official groups.

A M-407 came third in class at the 1000 Lakes Rally in 1957.

Like the M-402, there were four-wheel drive M-407s, too, beginning with the M-407-410N in June 1958 and the M-407-411N estate in August. At first, these had the three-speed, changing to the four-speed in 1960. A total of 11,890 four-wheel drive 402s and 407s were built by the end of production in January 1961, a result of Moskvitch being unable to keep up with demand for its mainstream M-407s.

In 1961, the M-407 was further upgraded with an even more powerful M-407D1-D2 engine (allowing to handle the fourth speed on a manual transmission), self-adjusting brake cylinders and hydraulic clutch drive, improved front suspension for easier driving, and a completely restructured dashboard. This model, manufactured as the Moskvitch 403, served as a transition between the second and the third generation Moskvitches, debuting in 1964, with the mechanical components of the Moskvitch 408 (which had not yet appeared) and the body of the M-402. The M-403E and M-403IE were intended for export. In 1963, an estate variant, the 424, appeared (with the 424E the export model). The M-403 lasted only until July 1965, with 133,523 cars built (50,612 for export).

The M-402 was discontinued by August 1959, with the M-407 production ending in October 1963 (with 359,980 built, 120,903 for export).

The M-407 was the first Soviet automotive export to be truly successful in the West. Up to half of all M-407 production was exported for a number of years, mainly to the Eastern Bloc countries, Norway, Finland, and France. In parts of Western Europe, it was rebranded the Elite, to avoid conflict with Peugeot, which had trademarked names with middle "0"s. A large number of the cars sold in Western Europe were assembled by Sobimpex (known as Scaldia from 1965) in Seneffe, Belgium. Owned by a Romanian-born Belgian, Joseph Beherman, Scaldia was the first to assemble Soviet automobiles within the EEC. To keep up with Western standards of speed and fuel economy, Beherman also offered a Perkins 4.99 diesel engine of 1.6 litre and 43 hp (32 kW), which was only slightly slower than the petrol-engined model but considerably more economical. The cars received Belgian tires, while Deluxe models were fitted with European-made interiors and chrome brightwork. Test production began in 1962, with full series production commencing in March 1964. Production was of the M-407 and M-423, even though the newer M-403 had arrived in some markets.

The Moskvitch-402 and 407 could be considered as the first step in Soviet and Russian automotive history towards producing customer-adapted trim levels for various uses. While the M-407 provided greater driving comfort at bigger expenses, other trim levels included the M-407-424 station wagon available for the general public, M-431 delivery pick-up/ambulance van and even the 410/411 attempt of creating an SUV-based sedan/station wagon.

== M-403 ==
M-403 is actually derived from the 402 and 407 models but with some updates. It had another grille at the front, other tail lights, other equipment. It is also a transition model from 407 to the more modern 408 and later 412, though some parts are shared. While it kept the original 45 hp motor, some later models were equipped with the improved motor of 50 hp and the gearbox that were later found on the 408. These improvements also guaranteed a higher top speed, although with some road handling issues due to some outdated solutions still used. Some owners said that it can be considered a 407 with 408 features (beside motor, a better electric system, improved brakes mounted later on 408). It had quite a short production, from mid 1963 till early 1965. Production ended due to outdated design, 408 was already in production, was more confortable and faster, and 408 proved successful both in Soviet Union, Eastern Bloc but also in exports to West Europe. Also, the production line needed to be concentrated on M-408 and derivatives, to face the higher demand for them.

== Trims and body styles ==
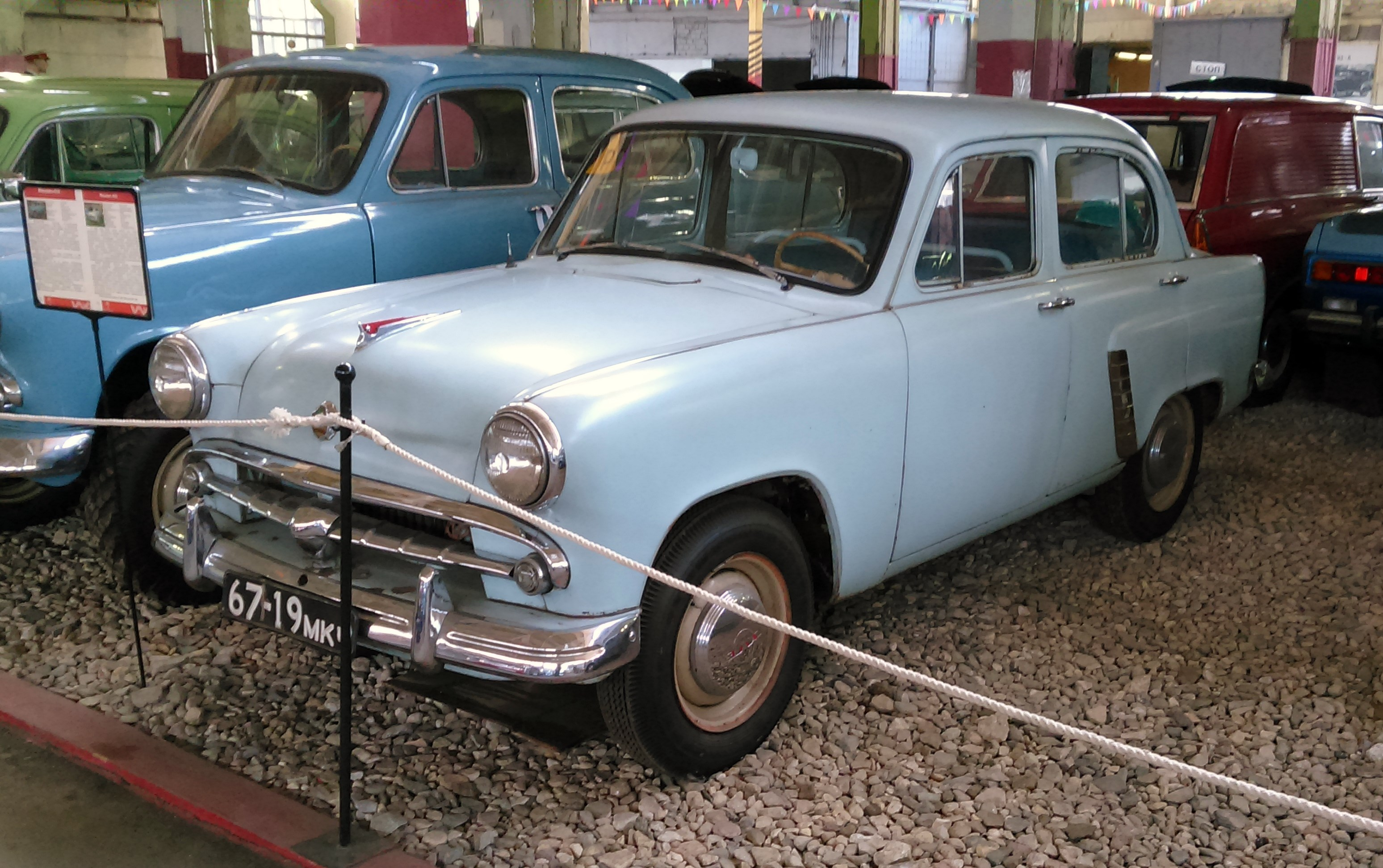
Moskvitch-402

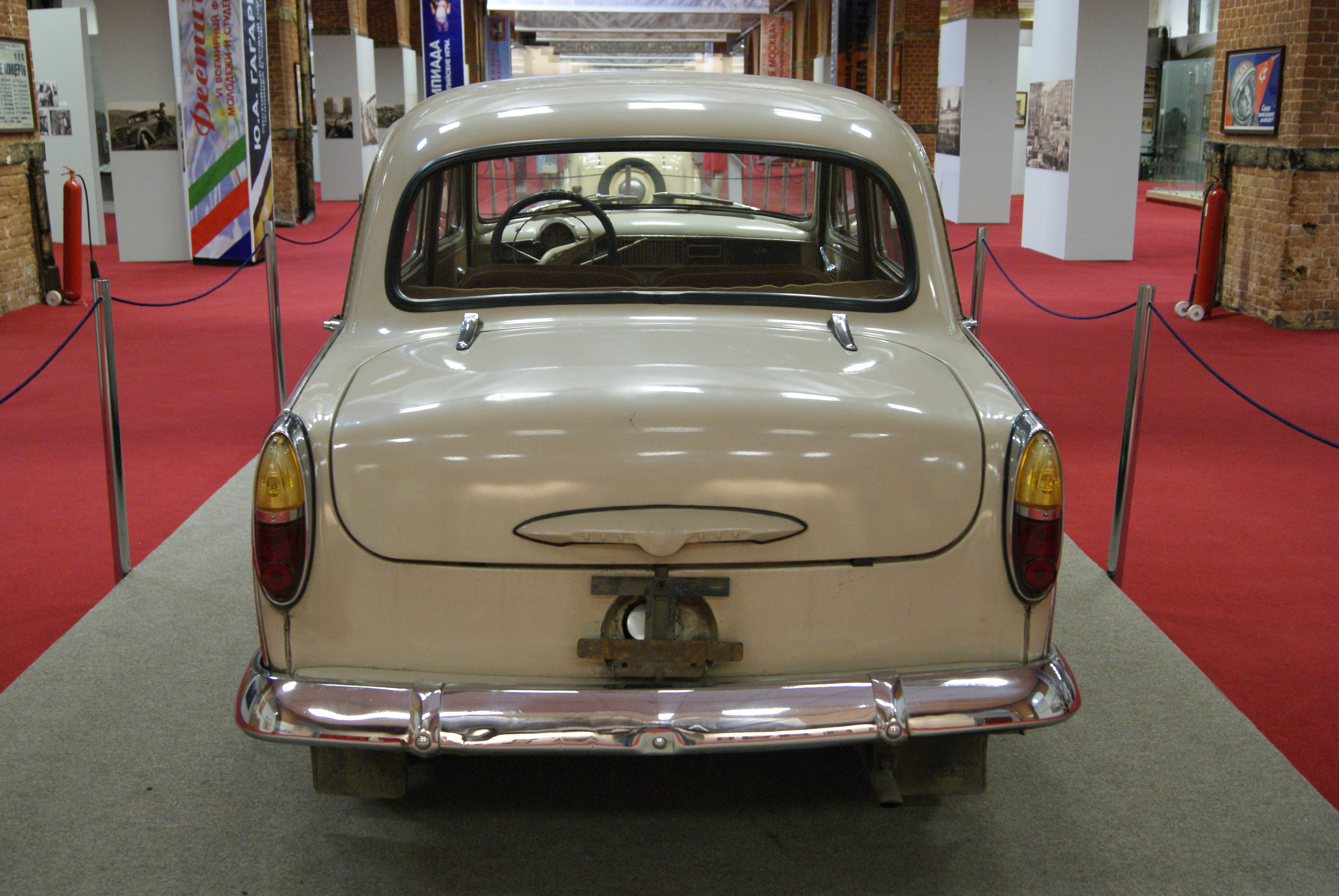
Moskvitch-403 (rear view). Early models of the Moskvitch-408 had similarly upright taillights

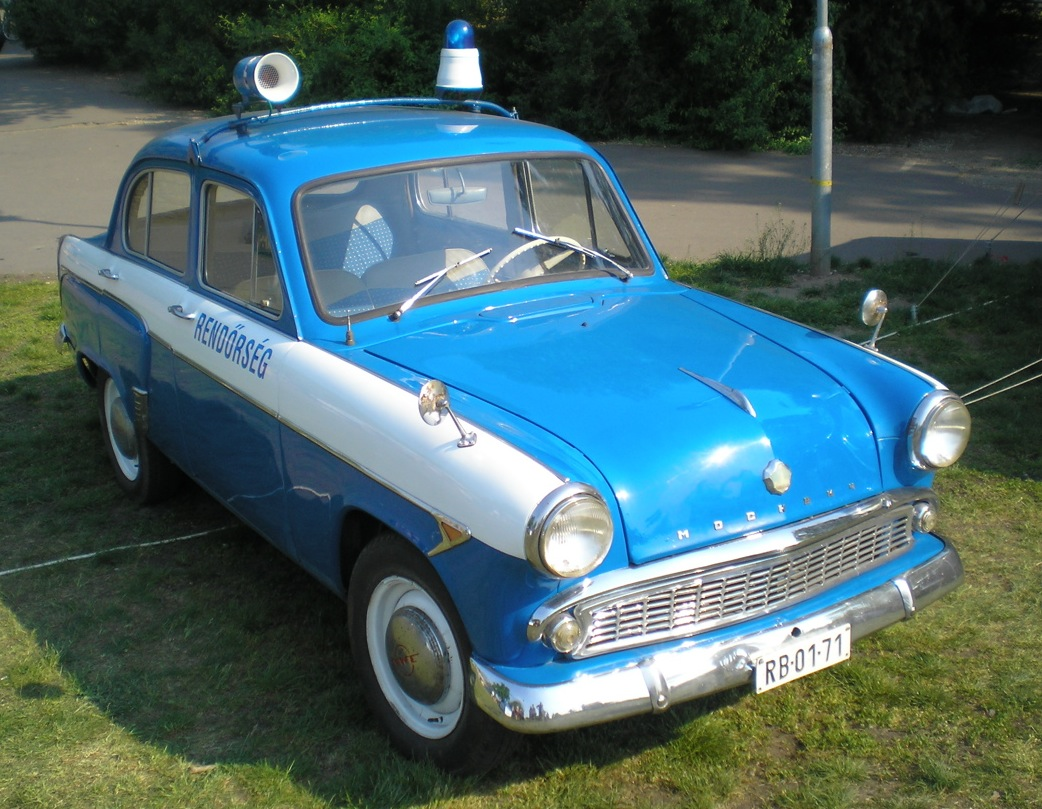
Moskvitch-407 (police car)

- Moskvitch 402 — the original series, produced from 1956 to 1958.
  - Moskvitch 402B – version of 402 for disabled persons
  - Moskvitch 402M – medical transport version of 402
  - Moskvitch 402T – taxicab version of 402
  - Moskvitch 410 — first Soviet crossover, briefly produced between 1957 and 1958. Based on the 402.
  - Moskvitch 423 — second generation station wagon (after Moskvitch 422-422K), produced between 1957 and 1958.
  - Moskvitch A9 — a 402-based minivan prototype, produced in 1957.
  - Moskvitch 428 — a delivery pick-up prototype based on the 402, cancelled in favor of the 430.
- Moskvitch 407 — same series with modified engine and frontal grille, produced from 1958 to 1964.
  - Moskvitch 407B – version for disabled persons
  - Moskvitch 407M – medical dispatch version (for transport of medical staff and equipment, but not for patients)
  - Moskvitch 407T – taxicab version
  - Moskvitch 410N — upgraded 410 with the old 407 engine, produced from 1958 to 1961.
  - Moskvitch 411 — a station wagon crossover, created by combining the 423 body with the 410N chassis, produced from 1959 to 1961.
  - Moskvitch 423N — upgraded version of 423 with 407 engine, produced 1958 through 1963.
    - Moskvitch 423Yu – version of 423N for warmer climates
    - Moskvitch 423Ye – export version of 423N
  - Moskvitch 430 – two-door panel van version of 423N. Produced from 1958.
  - Moskvitch 431 – prototype crossover version of 430. Produced in 1960.
- Moskvitch 403 — improved version of the 407, with notable interior accommodations. Produced from 1961 to 1965.
  - Moskvitch 403B – version of 403 for disabled persons
  - Moskvitch 403M – medical transport version of 403
  - Moskvitch 403T – taxicab version of 403
  - Moskvitch 403E — export version of the 403, produced from 1962 to 1965.
  - Moskvitch 424 — the 423 model redesigned to feature a convertible passengers/cargo rear compartment, possible unification of 423 and 430 models released from 1963 to 1965.
    - Moskvitch 424Yu – version of 424 for warmer climates
    - Moskvitch 424Ye – export version of 424, produced from 1962 to 1965.
  - Moskvitch 424E – station wagon version of 424 for export.
  - Moskvitch 432 — panel van version of 403
    - Moskvitch 432E – export version of 432
- Moskvitch 407 coupe (Moskvitch 409) — a 407-based sports car, produced in 1962.

== Sources ==
- Thompson, Andy. Cars of the Soviet Union. Somerset, UK: Haynes Publishing, 2008.
- Flory, J. "Kelly", Jr. American Cars 1946-1959. Jefferson, NC: McFarland & Coy, 2008.
