= Moskvitch 408 =

Soviet small family car

Moskvitch-408/Izh-408
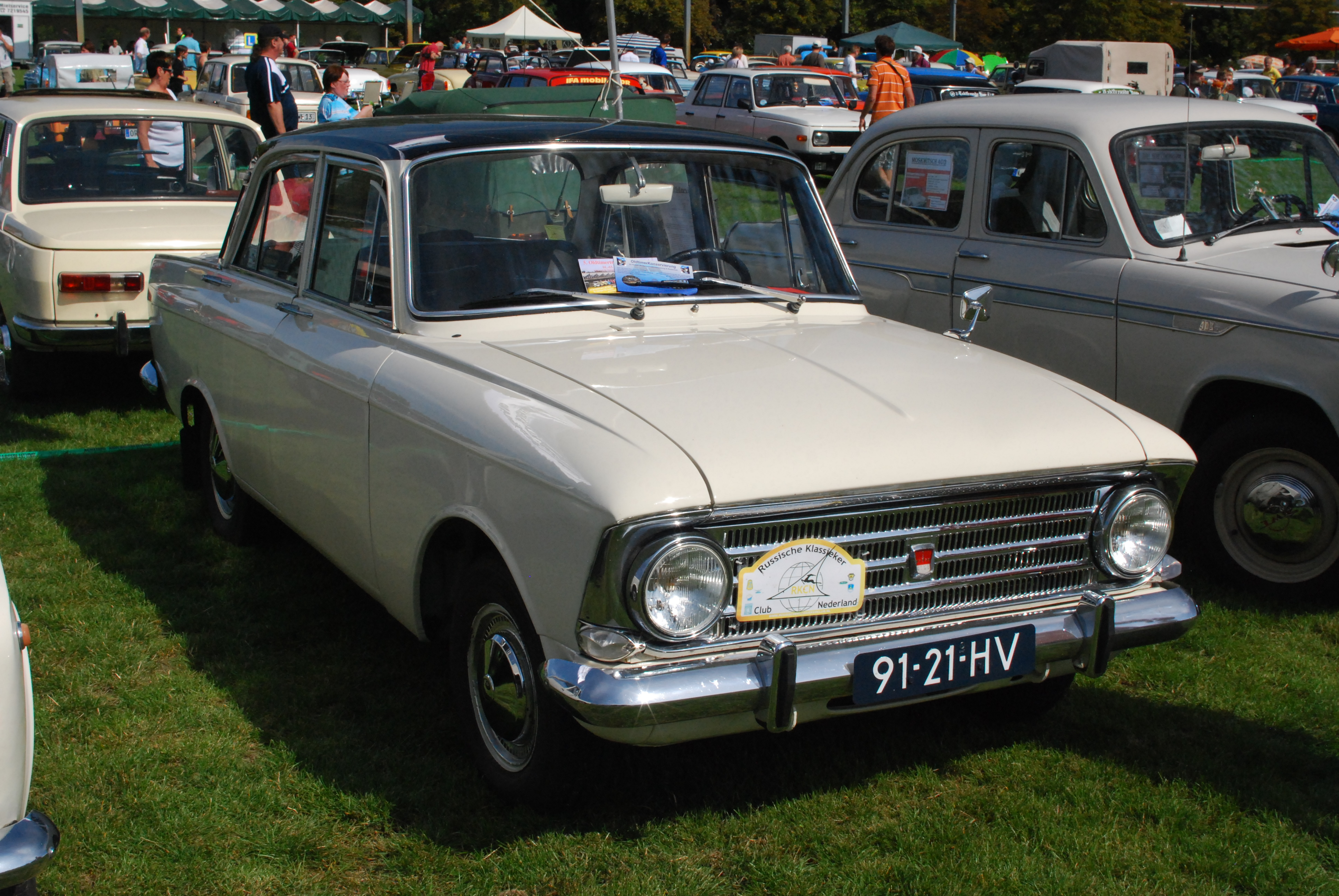

Overview
- Manufacturer: MZMA (1964–1967); AZLK (1967–1976); IZh (1966–1967)
- Also called: Elite/Elite 1300 (Europe); Carat (Norway); Scaldia 1300/1600 Diesel (Belgium)
- Production: 1964–1976 (Moskvitch); 1966–1967 (Izh)
- Assembly: Moscow, Russia (Moskvich/AZLK); Izhevsk, Russia (IZh); Brussels, Belgium (Scaldia-Volga); Lovech, Bulgaria (Balkancar)

Body and chassis
- Class: Small family car
- Body style: 4-door saloon; 5-door estate; 3-door panel van
- Layout: FR layout
- Related: Moskvitch 412

Powertrain
- Engine: 1357 cc MZMA-408 I4; 1760 cc Perkins 4.108 diesel I4
- Transmission: 4-speed manual

Dimensions
- Wheelbase: 2,400 mm (94.5 in)
- Length: 4,090 mm (161.0 in)
- Width: 1,550 mm (61.0 in)
- Curb weight: 945 kg (2,083 lb) (1964-1969); 1,045 kg (2,304 lb); (1969-1976)

Chronology
- Predecessor: Moskvitch 402/403/407
- Successor: Moskvitch 412

The Moskvitch-408 (also referred to as the Moskvich-408, and M-408) series is a small family car produced by the Soviet car manufacturer MZMA/AZLK between 1964 and 1975. The first prototype was made in 1960.

The M-408, the first of the series, replaced the second generation Moskvitch 407 as the main production model; it had a longer wheelbase than the 407. Design work started in 1959, and the first prototype appeared in March 1961. The first production 408 was built 1 August 1964, and the 408 was given its official debut on October 21. First marketed body styles of the main version were a four-door saloon (base), five-door estate (the model M-426, an upgrade of second generation M-423 and M-424), and a three-door sedan delivery (the M-433, an upgrade of the second generation M-432 delivery pick-up).

The IZh-408 was a duplicate version of the car made by IZh factory in Izhevsk from 1966 to 1967. It was then replaced in production by the M-412.

In 1976, alongside the M-412, the series were succeeded by the third generation M-2140 series.

== Production series ==
There were two distinct series of the M-408, which both used the same name. On 20 August 1966, Moskvitch produced its 100,000th M-408.

The first series of cars were produced between 1964 and 1969 in Moscow. These automobiles had vertical rear lights, two or four round headlights, a front bench seat, and a 4-speed manual transmission with column mounted gear lever. The length of the standard model was 4,090 mm (161.0 in).

The second series was produced between 1969 and 1976. It had the same engine and transmission as its predecessor, but an updated body fitted with rectangular headlights and horizontal rear lights, with triangular turn signal markers mounted on tailfins. Also it had separated bucket seats and the transmission used a floor-mounted gear lever.

Between 1966 and 1967, the car was also produced by the IZh military factory in the city of Izhevsk, carrying the IZh-Moskvitch-408 name — though usually called simply "IZh". This car was a rebadged version of the MZMA Moskvitch-408. It was replaced in production with the IZh-412, a copy of the M-412, starting in 1967 and up to 1976.

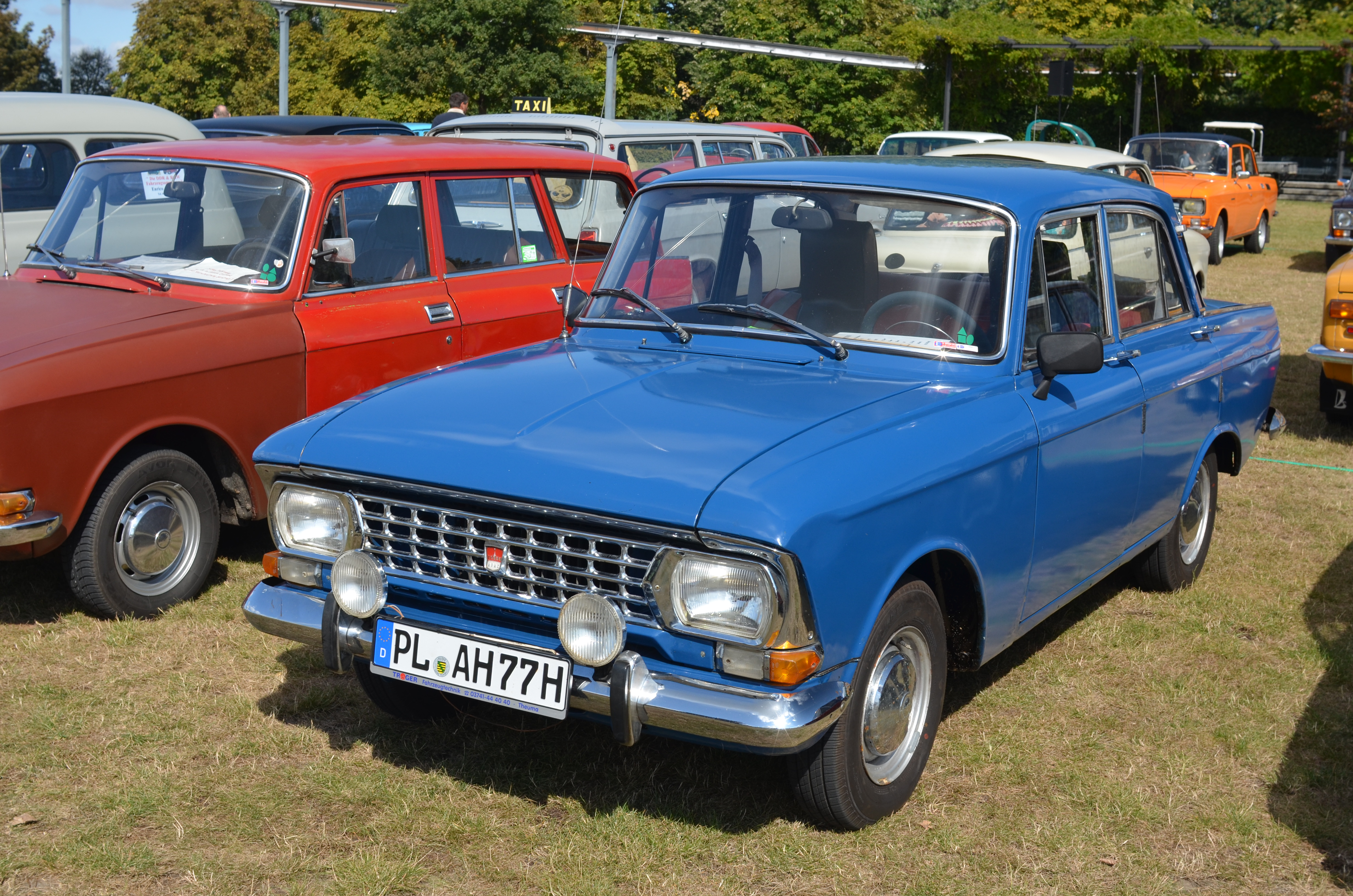
Moskvitch-408 second series

=== Development ===
The M-433 debuted in mid-December 1966, early models having a dividing bulkhead with a small behind the driver; later, the height was reduced so the driver could reach the cargo box. The rear door was split in two halves, top and bottom, while the solid sides were corrugated, rather than smooth as was typical in Western deliveries.

The M-426 appeared in March 1967; like the delivery version, it had stiffer rear springs.

In 1967, the M-408 models were facelifted with a different grille and logo design, also featured on the co-produced Moskvitch 412 model. Both cars shared similar exterior design, with a slightly modified interior and new engine for the M-412. In 1969, after a complete revamp of the body design occurred, the company introduced new taillights, tailfins and somewhat thicker interior dashboards. Later on, a more advanced car built on the same platform would be known as the M-2138/40. Moskvitch designed a prototype fastback convertible in March 1964, the M-408 Tourist, with aluminum body panels and vertical taillights. Only two were built.

== Appearance and interior ==
The car had modern features for 1964: squared-off body with flat roof panel and sharp tailfins, panoramic rear window and semi-panoramic windshield. Deluxe versions had then-fashionable quad headlights and (some series) two-tone paint. Since the layout of the first prototypes was created on the basis of the preceding M-407, the rear end design of the pre-facelift models inherited such characteristic features of the previous Moskvitch series as tailfins decorated with chrome trims, narrow taillights, a recognisable trunk handle, and a fuel tank flap in the middle, behind the number plate.

The interior featured a stylish trapezoidal instrument cluster, column-mounted gear shift lever (until 1973), effective heater and had a then-common practical artificial leather (vinyl) upholstery (colour-coded).

== Technical details ==
The M-408 was a conventional rear-wheel drive economy car powered by a 1357 cc OHV straight-four, producing 50 hp (37 kW) at 4750 rpm (60.5 SAE hp). After 1967, the assembly of the engines was done by UZAM in Ufa. One two-barrel down-draft carburettor was used. Export versions had a slight increase in power, up to 54 hp (40 kW), slightly reduced emisissions and slightly higher top speed. The car was initially equipped with self-adjusting manual drum brakes, then from 1969 with power brakes with a hydrovacuum servo and a split circuit braking system.

This Moskvitch was the first Soviet-built car to have deliberate safety equipment (since 1969): crumple zones, a safer steering column, a soft grip steering wheel cover, soft interior parts, seat belts, a padded dashboard, and a split circuit braking system.

== Sales ==
The car sold well in both the Soviet Union and other Eastern Bloc countries and was sold for export. In the USSR, the M-408/412 was the second best selling Moskvitch for the whole 1970s decade, bested only by its successor, the M-2140. In order to make it more competitive, the car was often upgraded during the time of its production and equipped with better gearboxes, more powerful 75 hp (SAE) motors, hydrovacuum brake boosters, etc.

Export models (408E) had quadruple headlights. The car was sold in France as the Moskvitch 1300, as the Moskvitsh Elite (408)/Elite De Luxe (408E)/Elite 1300 in Finland and as the Moskvich Carat in Norway. It was powered, since 1966 by 1,357 cc (82.8 cu in) straight four petrol engine, producing 54 hp (40 kW). It had a top speed of 80 mph (130 km/h), which was faster than the contemporary Volga. "More worth than its price", was its slogan for export sales. It proved a good value in Britain, Finland, and Norway, for instance, and in 1968, 55 percent of production was for export.

It was also assembled by Scaldia-Volga SA in Brussels, Belgium. In Belgium the car was sold as the Scaldia 1300/1400, although Scaldia also installed Perkins' 1.8-litre 4.108 engine in the Scaldia Diesel beginning in 1968. This model offered 52 hp (38 kW) SAE, but lacked the twin headlamps of the petrol-engined export 408. It offered a 120 km/h (75 mph) top speed, not a dramatic change from the classic 408 engine, but offered better fuel economy. The 1.6-liter, 44 hp (32 kW) Perkins 4.99 engine was mounted between 1965 and early 1966, when it was replaced by the 1.8-liter version. This smaller engine was also mounted on the Moskvich 407.

== Differences from M-412 ==
The M-408 and the M-412 were produced at the same time until December 1975/January 1976, when they were replaced with the Moskvitch-2140/2138. The M-412 was a more upmarket version, powered by a 1500 cc, 75 hp (55 kW) OHC slant-four engine. Introduced in 1967, the original Moskvitch 412 of 1967–1969 had externally identical to the contemporary M-408, both had two or four round headlights.

The 1970–1976 M-408IE and M-412IE also had identical bodies, and the M-412 received the same changes as the M-408 did in December 1969. Again, the only differences between them were the engines (1300 and 1500 cc respectively), which makes them impossible to distinguish, since from the facelift onward, all Moskvitch-408/412 sedans manufactured by AZLK always had a Latin "Moskvich" logo on the trunk lid, without the actual model number. Another difference was that the M-412's speedometer read up to 160 km/h while that of the 408 only reached 140 km/h. The gear lever of the early M-412 was column-mounted, since it had a front bench and shared its gearbox with the M-408. Since late 1968, the lever was floor-mounted because a newer gearbox was used to improve performances and make a better use of the new engine and bucket seats were adopted. By comparison, the Izh Moskvitch-412 had the floor-mounted lever and bucket seats from its introduction.

While running, the most notable difference between 408 and 412 is the sound of the engine, 412 being more silent and smooth than 408. Also, the exhaust pipe of 412 was slightly larger in diameter. First M-412 series, between 1967 and 1969 are a rare sight today, because they were manufactured in lower numbers than M-408, and it was more expensive and barely exported as the Ufa motor plant could not supply enough M-412 engines. The Moskvitch-408 had an oil bath air cleaner until the end of the series, even when this engine was passed to the 2138/2140 series, whereas the Moskvitch-412 had a dry type air cleaner, although first series, until late 1968 also had an oil bath air cleaner.

In December 1966, the Izhevsk factory introduced the Izh Moskvitch-408, which was a badge-engineered copy of the M-408. It didn't last long and was discontinued in early 1968, soon after the Izh Moskvitch-412 entered production in December 1967. Izh never built any 408-engined Moskvitch models after that, all of its original designs (the Izh-2125 Kombi and the Izh-2715 series) used exclusively the UZAM-412 engine too.

== Models ==
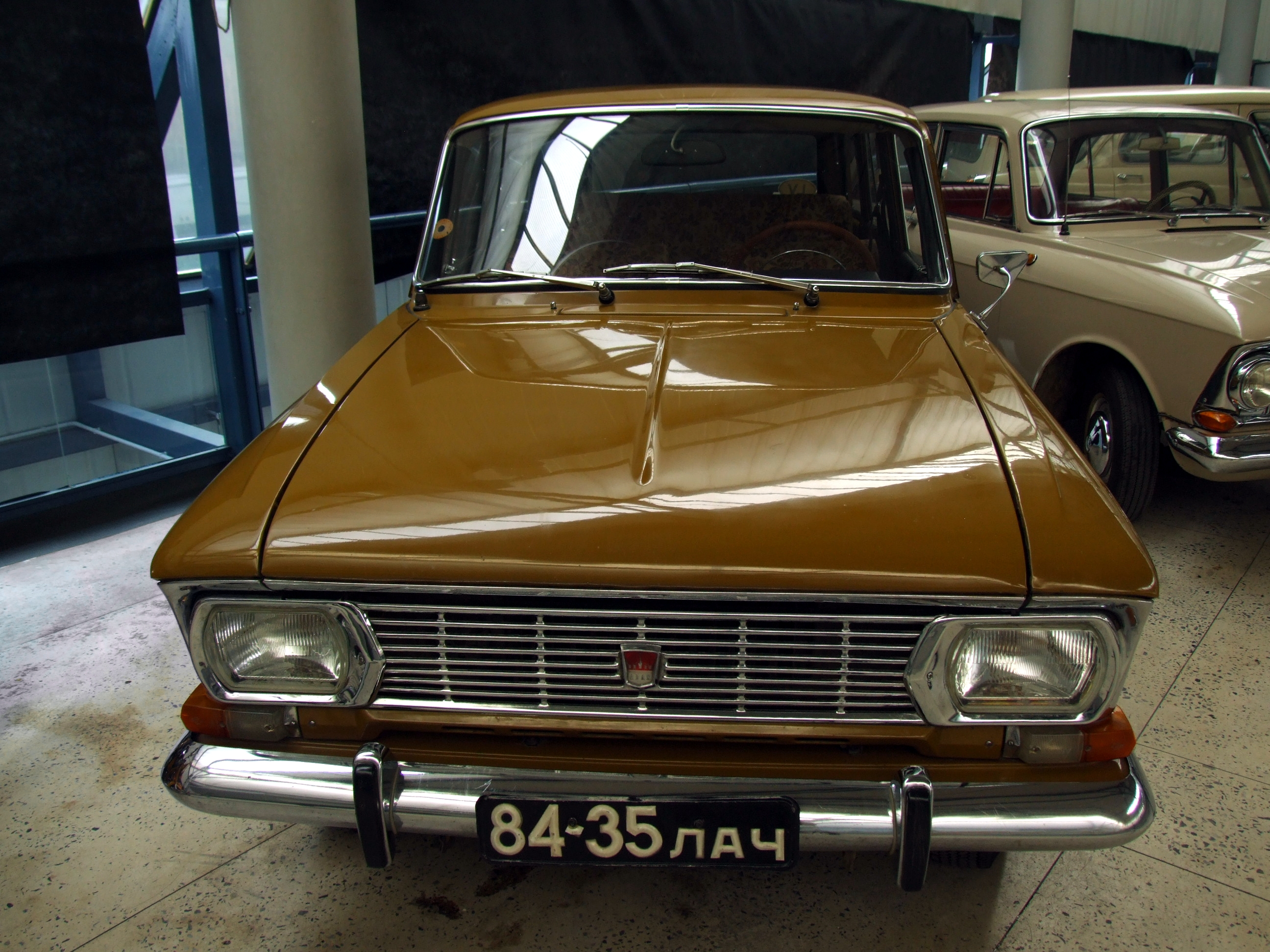
Moskvitch-426E

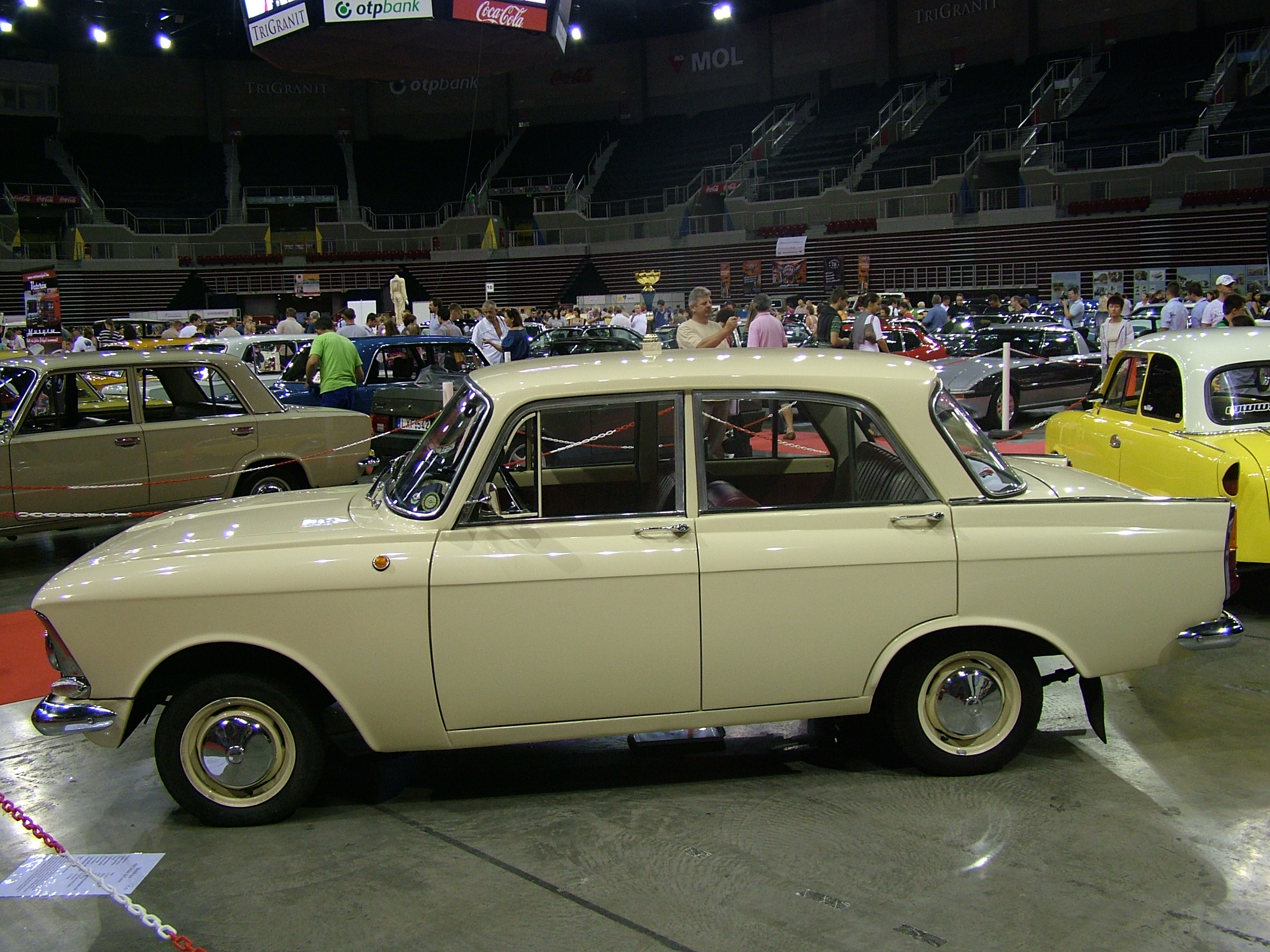
Moskvitch 408

- M-408: 4-door sedan (1964-1976)
- M-426: 5-door station wagon (1967–1976)
- M-433: 3-door station wagon-based panel van (1966–1976)
- M-408E/426E/433E: 1964-1969 export variants, with different adaptations for different markets, most notably four round headlamps instead of two.
- M-408IE/426IE/433IE: index for all 1970-1976 cars, both domestic and export, as the standards became unified.
- M-408YU/426YU/433YU: for export variants (both series) adapted for countries with hotter climate (Ю — "южный", southern).
- M-408P/426P/433P: for export variants (both series) with right-hand drive, mainly, and possibly exclusively, for the British market.
- M-408PYU/426PYU/433PYU: right-hand-drive variants for hotter climate; might not have entered production, as the UK appears to be the sole right-hand-drive market served by AZLK.
- M-408B: sedan with hand controls (both series), no 412-engined counterpart. Unlike the SMZ microcars and the disability variants of the ZAZ Zaporozhets, which were leased for free, it was leased for a one-time payment.
- M-408M: medical dispatch sedan (both series). Beyond the standard medical livery, it had no differences from the retail sedan, as it was solely used as a transport for house calls.
- M-408T/426T: taxi variants of the sedan and the station wagon. The Moskvitch-408T appears to have been planned but never actually entering production beyond a pilot series, it was mentioned only in the early repair manuals with no detailed specifications, and appeared in a photo in a single 1965 Za Rulem issue; the Moskvitch-426T appeared only in the repair manuals with no known evidence of actually being manufactured. The "Moskvitch-412T" appears to be a modern conjecture, no Soviet period documentation mentions it.
- M-408 Tourist: experimental 2+2 2-door convertible (with removable hard top), 2 examples built in 1964; fitted with aluminium body and electronically controlled fuel injection system.

Exported cars (with an -E suffix, i.e. Moskvitch 408E) usually had higher-compression engines, a small increase in power, up to 54 hp (40 kW), slightly reduced emissions, additional chrome trim and four round headlights instead of two (until the change to rectangular lights in 1969). Since 1968 all 408 intended for export outside of the Warsaw Bloc were equipped with the 54 hp version, although in the Soviet Union and in Eastern Europe the 50 hp model was still also available. Top speed was slightly higher, 130 km/h (81 mph), while acceleration from 0 – 100 km/h (62 mph) was slightly reduced to 27 seconds from 29 seconds.

== Illustrations ==
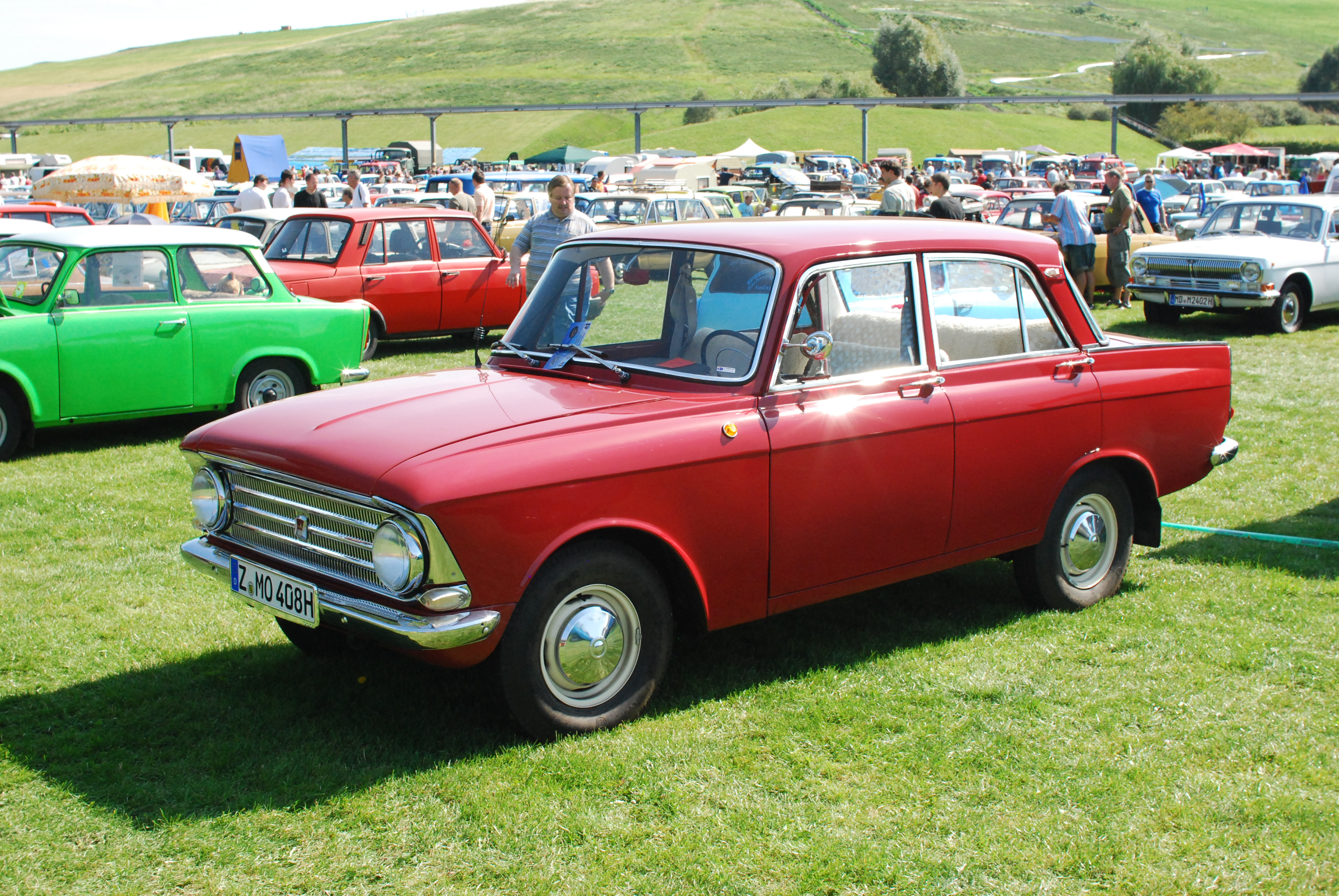
Early Moskvitch-408

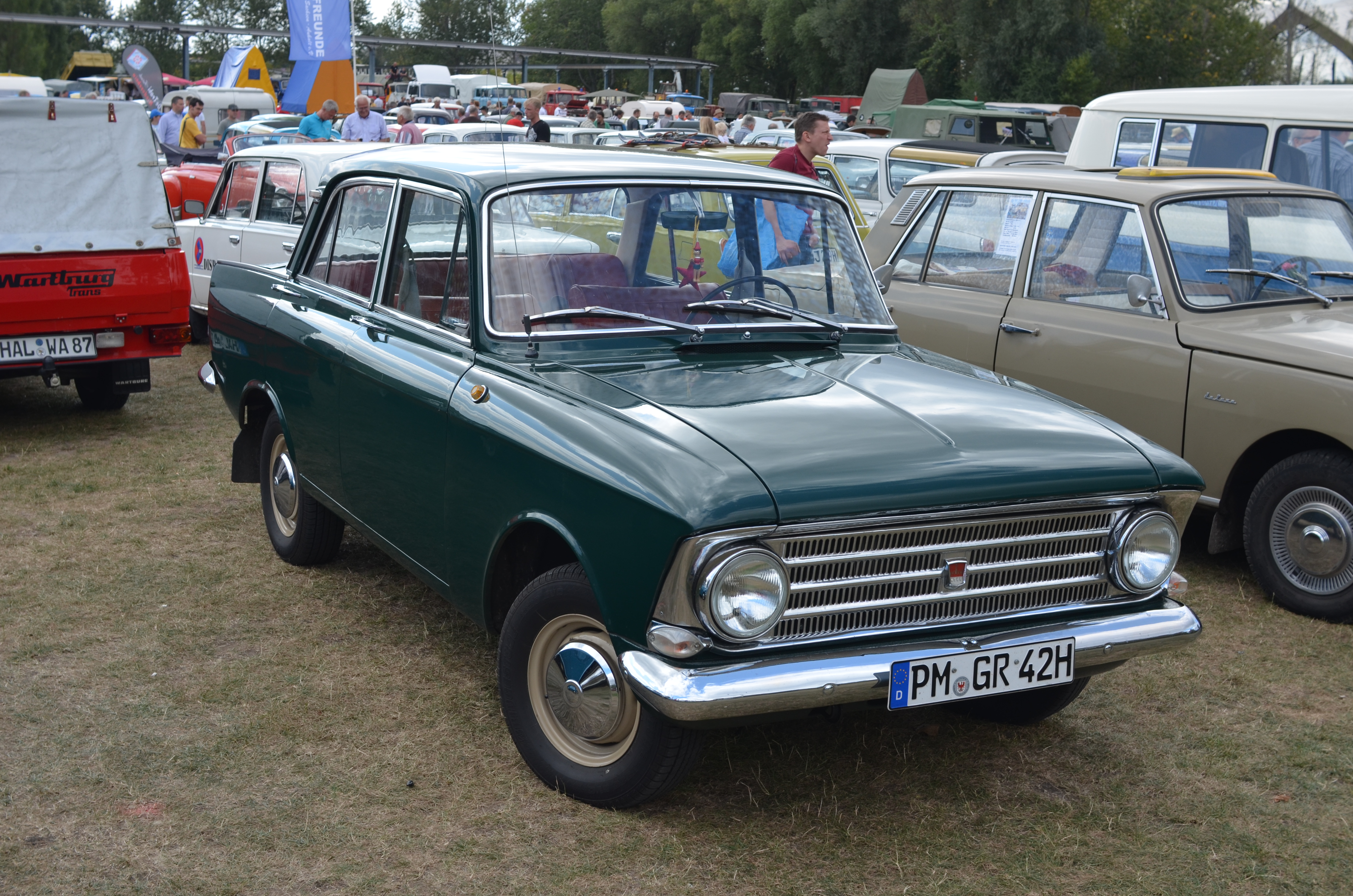

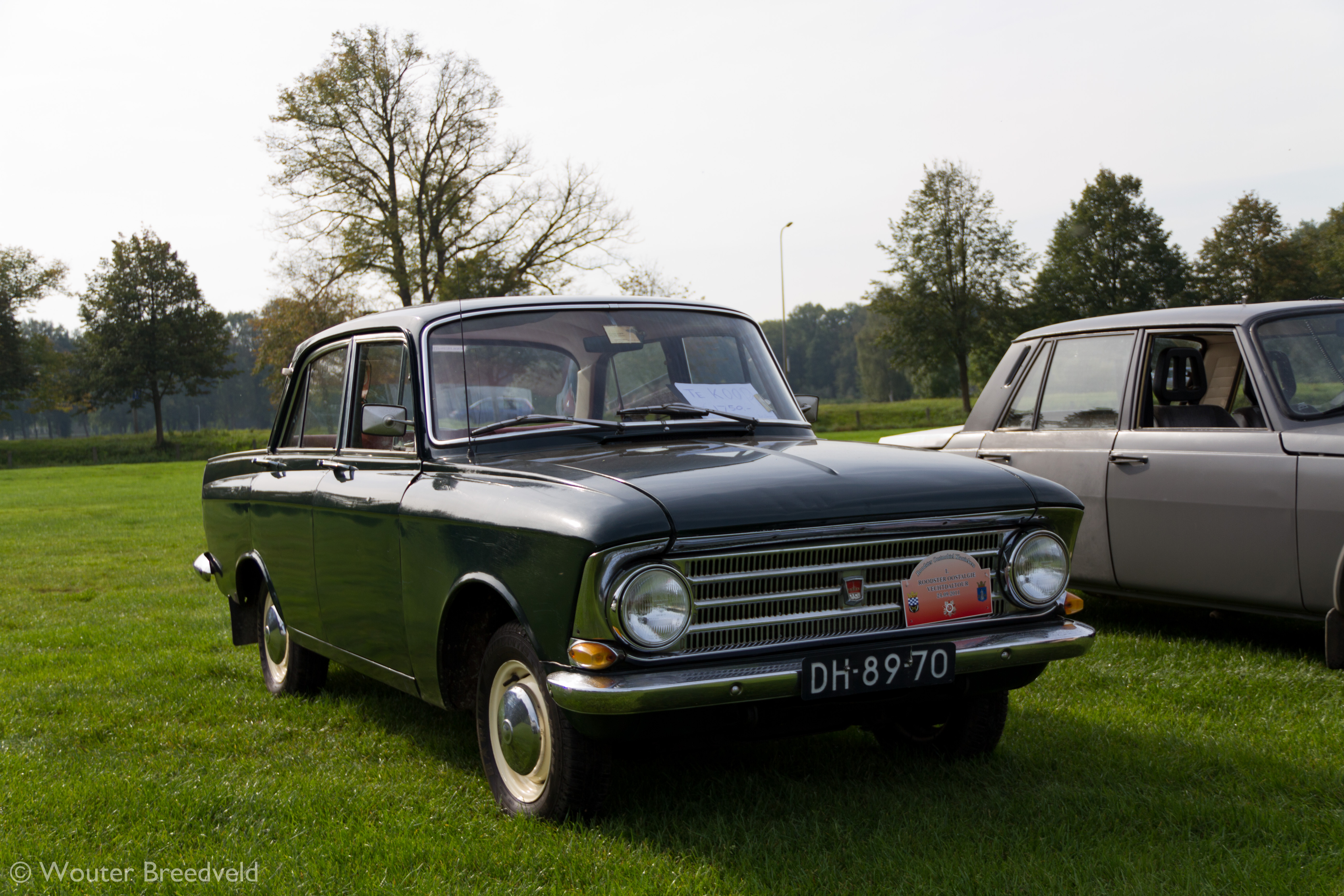

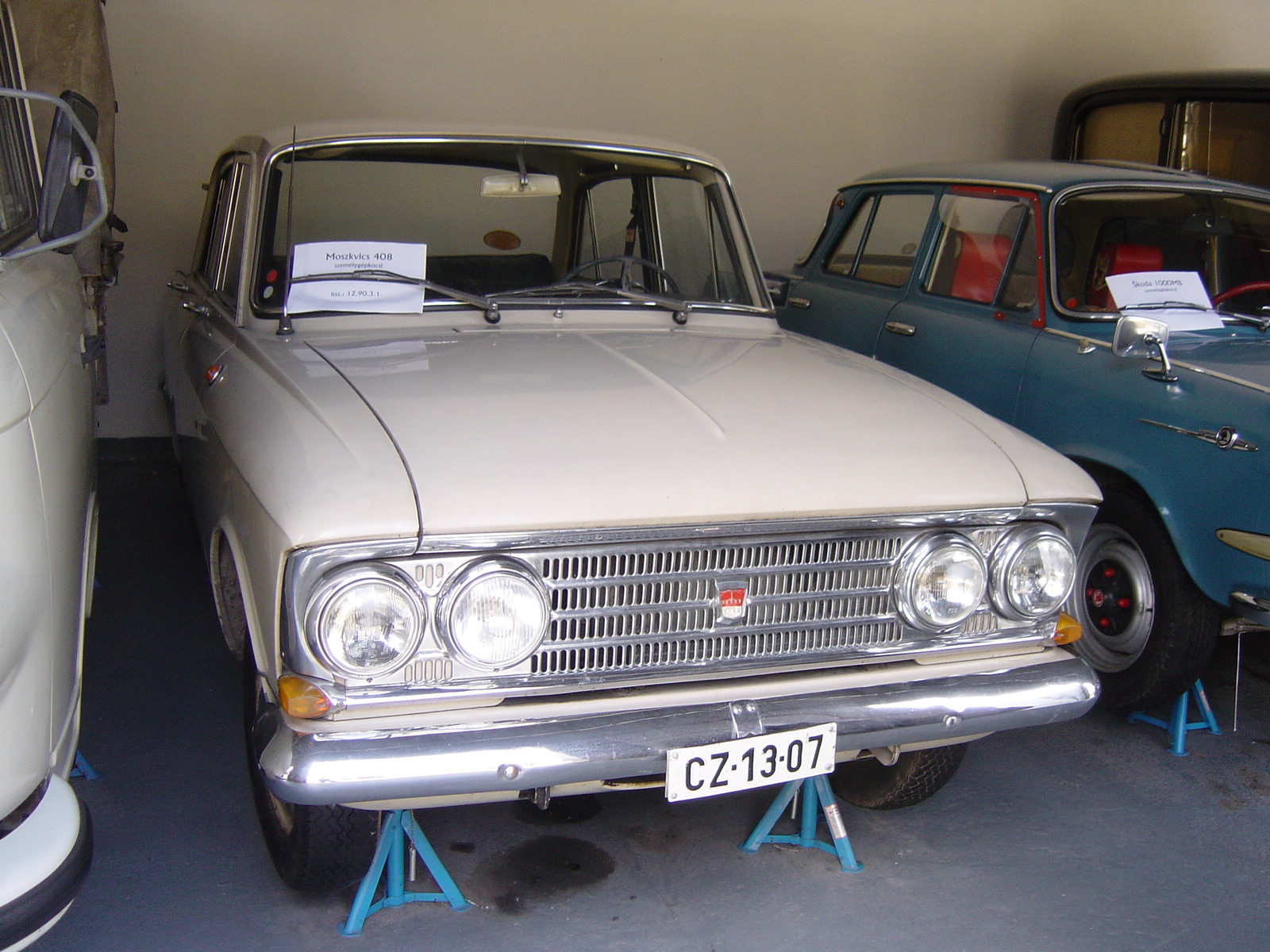
Quad headlight model M-408E was produced between 1964 and 1969 for the international market only

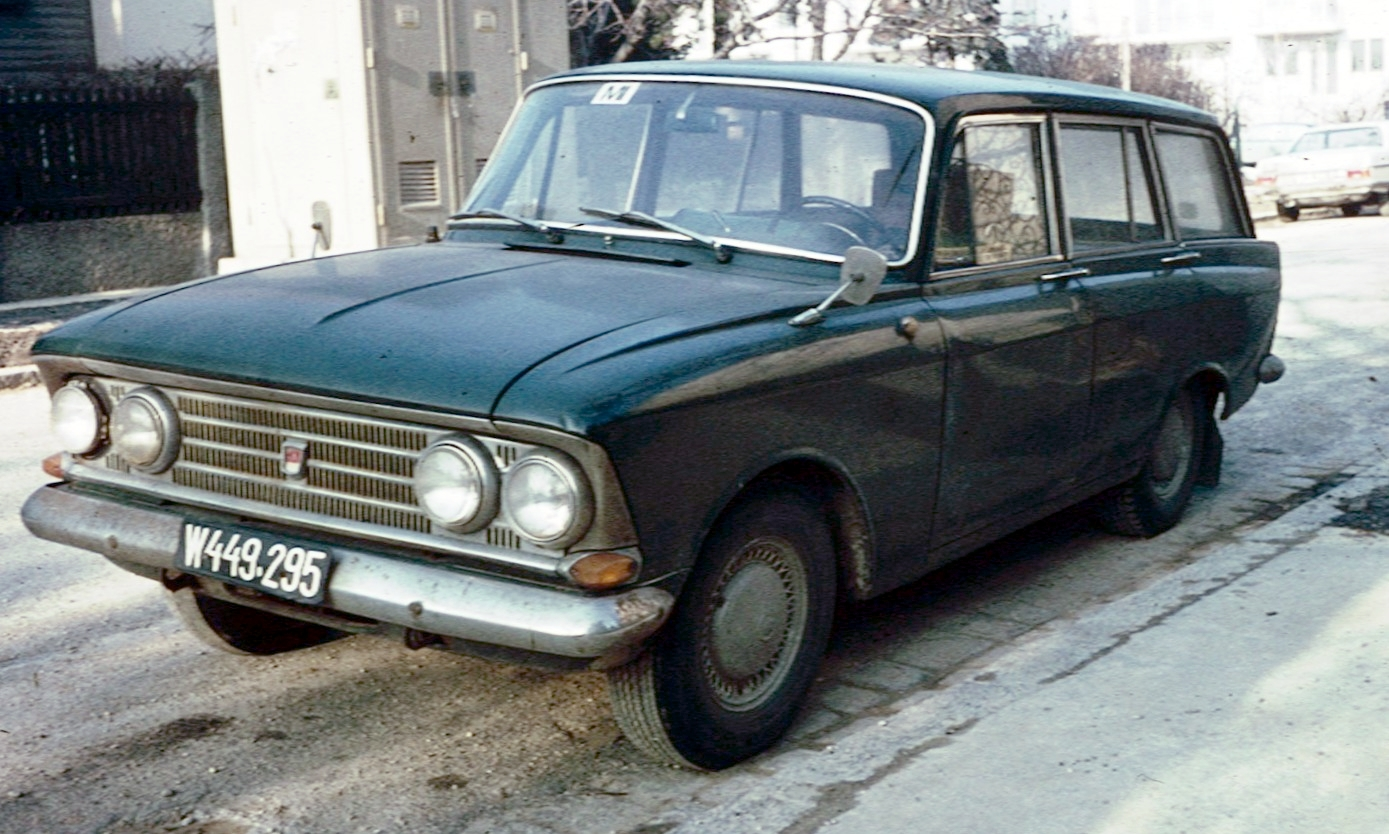
Moskvitch-426 in Vienna

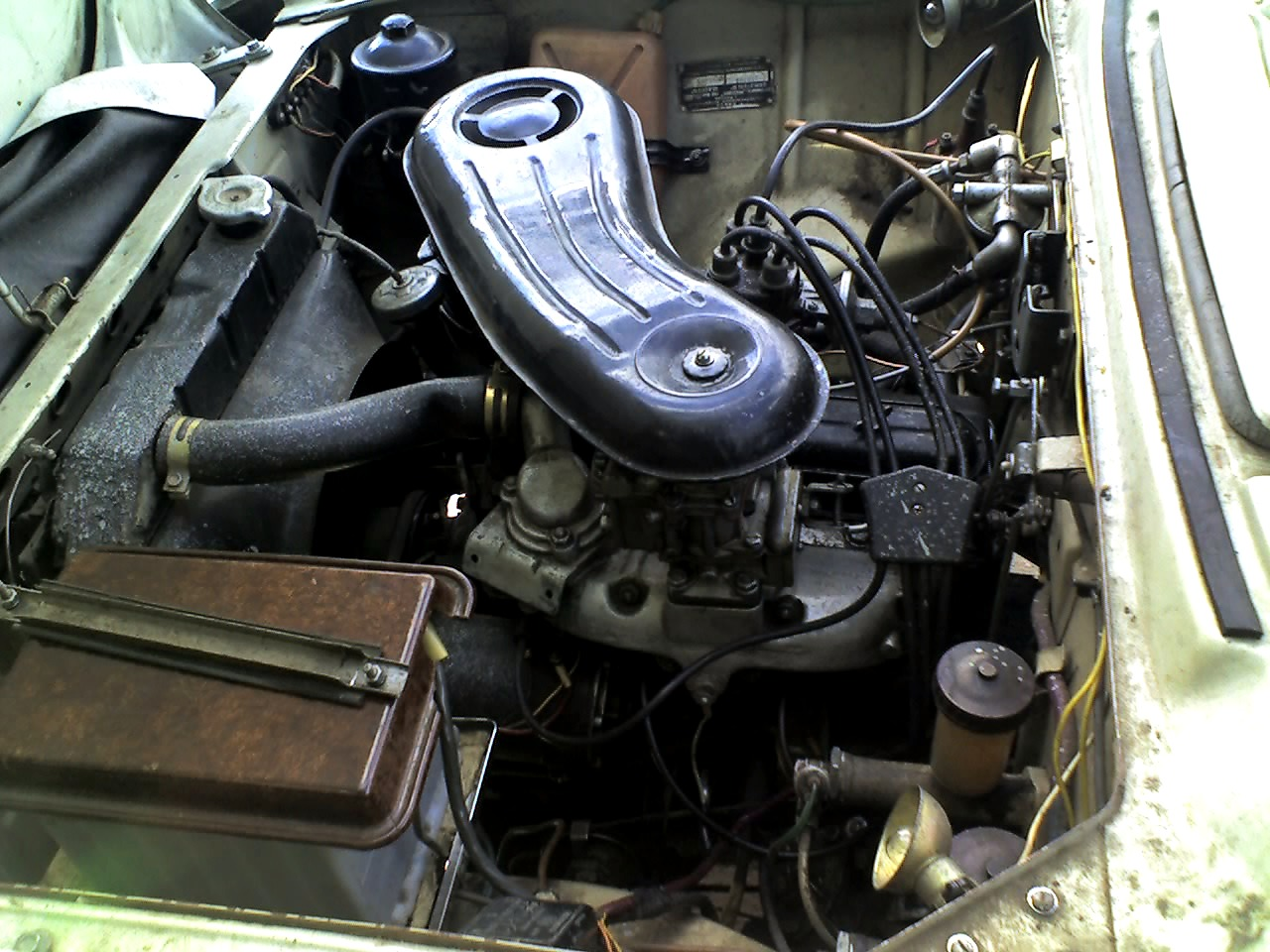
M-408 engine, left side.

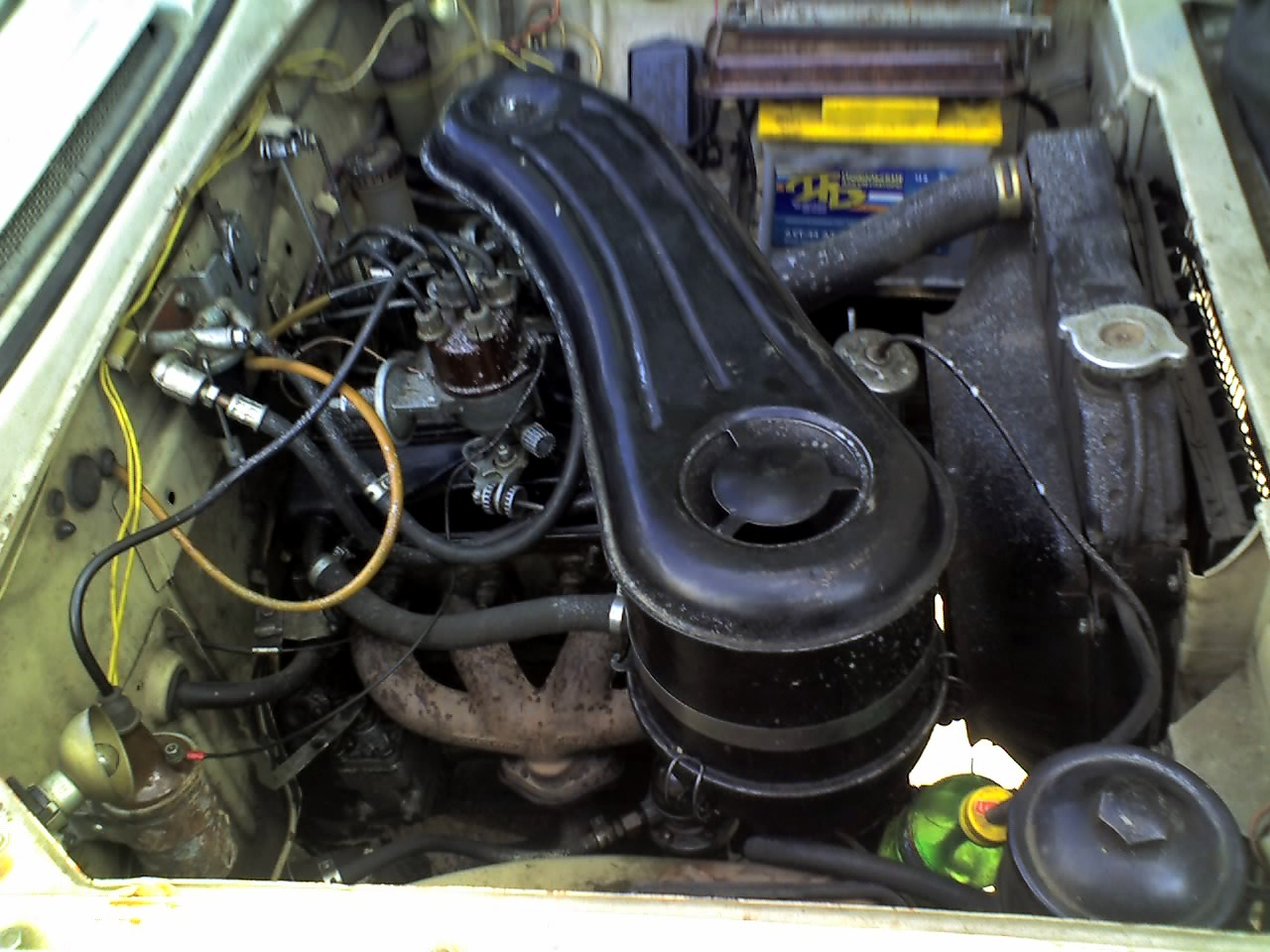
M-408 engine, right side.

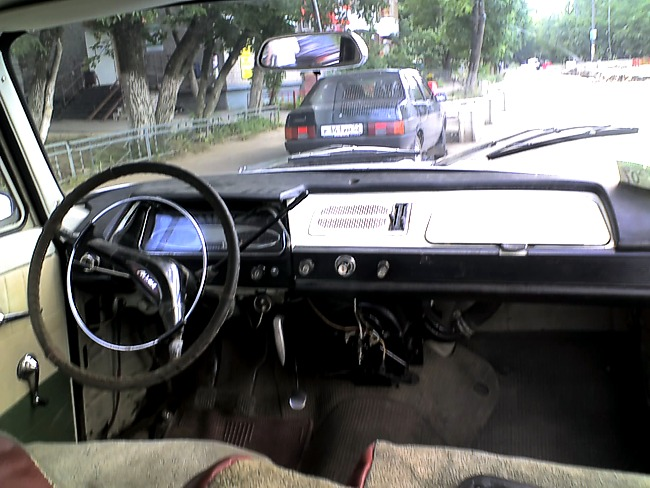
Interior of the pre-1969 version.

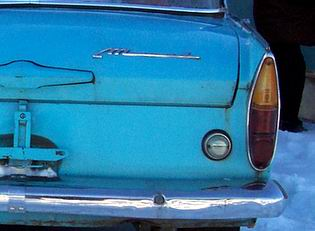
Pre-1969 tail design

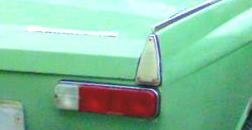
Post-1969 tail lights

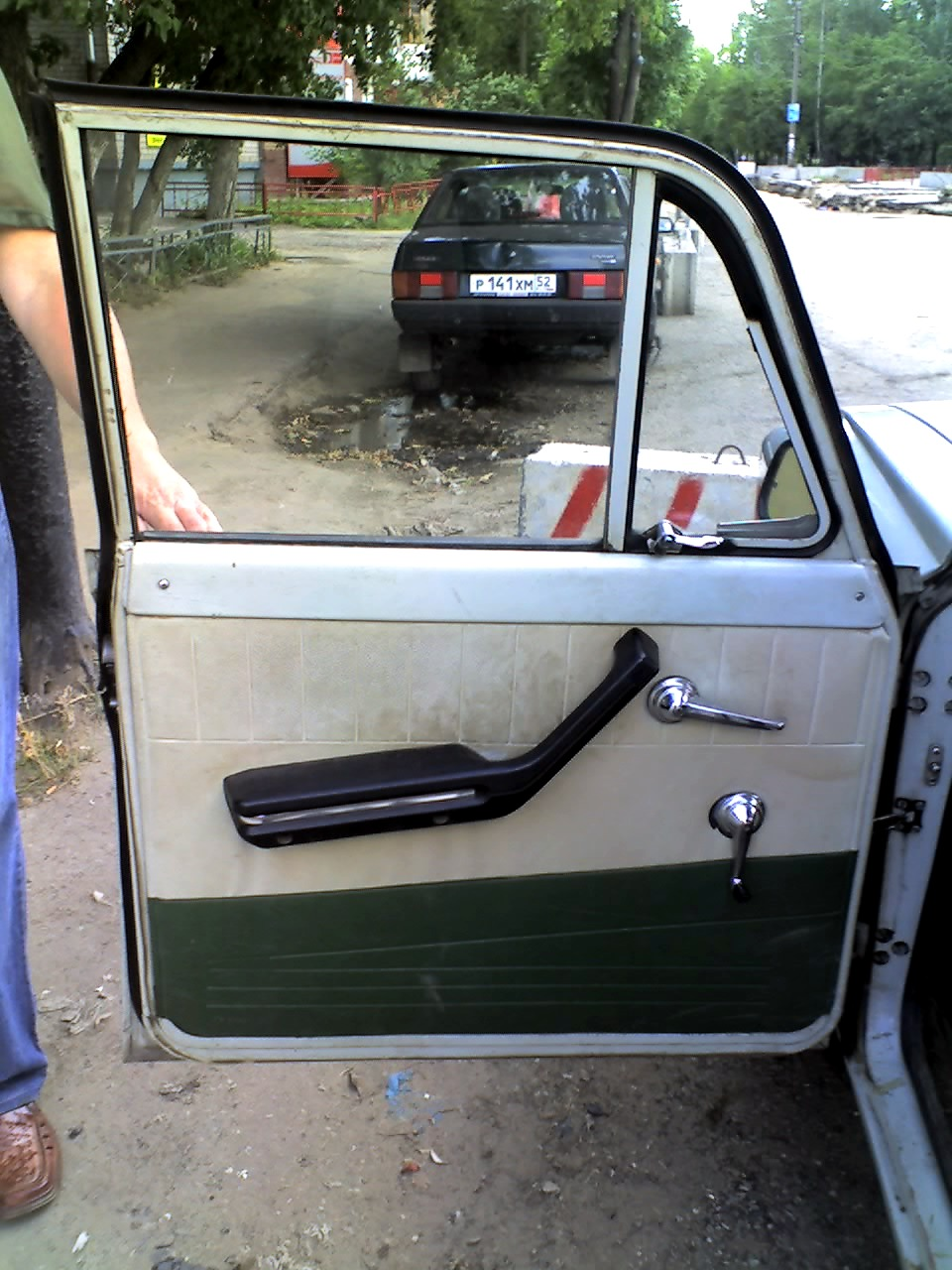

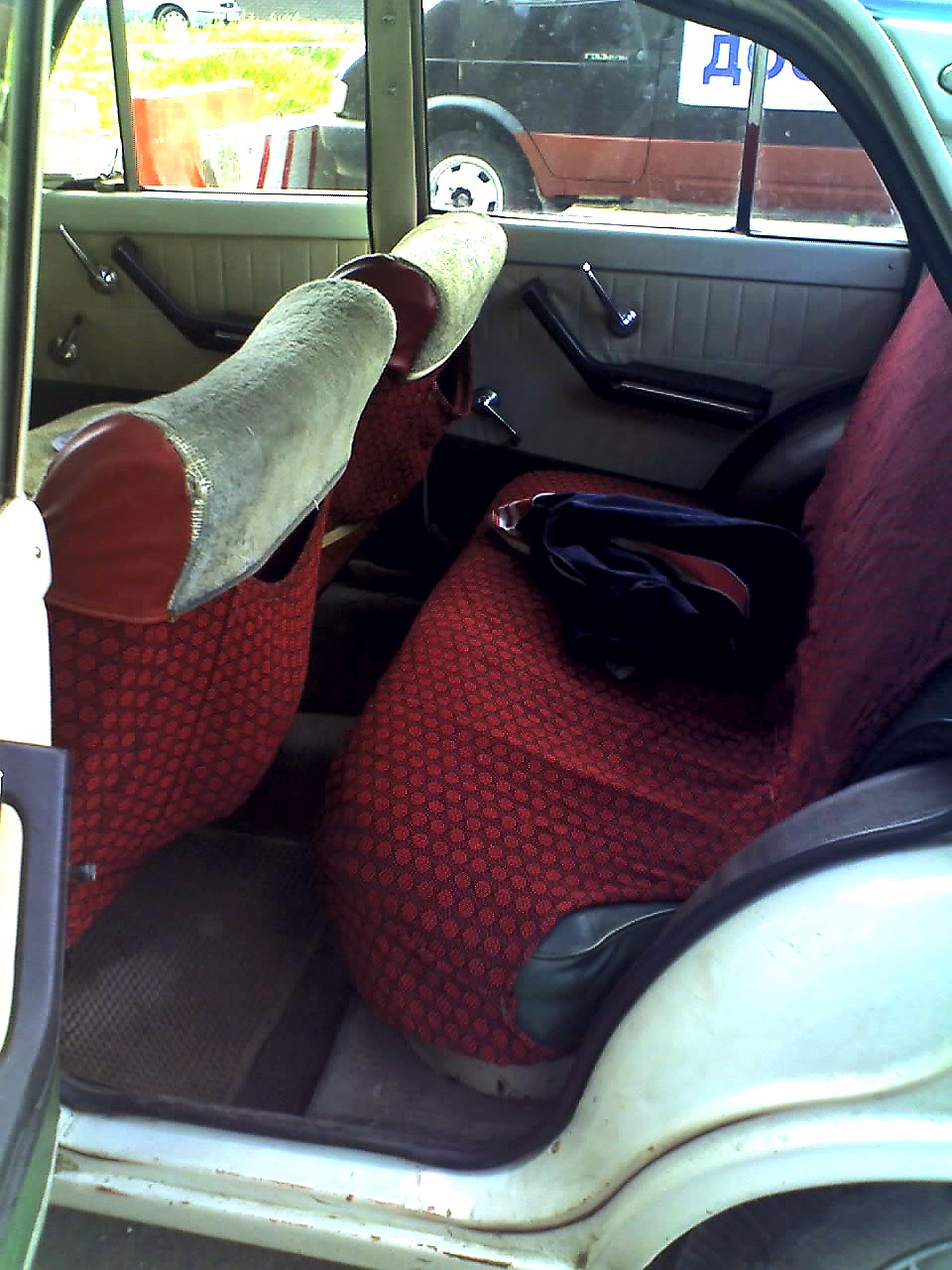

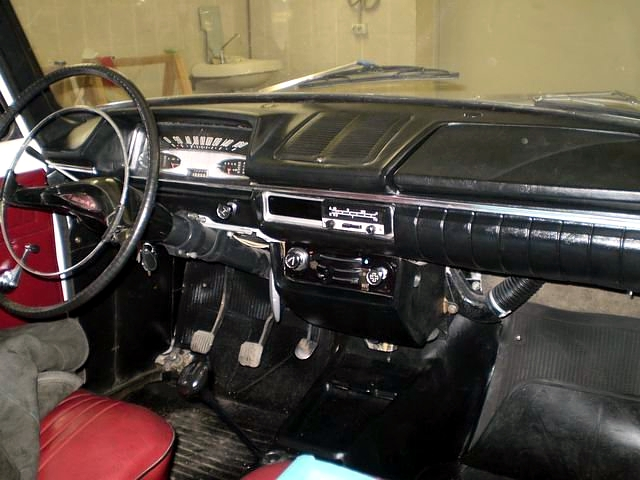
1970s interior, with separate front seats, central gear selector and fully padded dash board

== In popular culture ==
- The Moskvitch 408 is featured prominently in the 2023 video game Atomic Heart as a drivable vehicle. Other unplayable vehicles can also be seen in the game.
