= Lada Izhevsk =

Carmaker based in Izhevsk, Russia

Lada Izhevsk Automotive Plant LLC
- Native name: ООО Лада Ижевский Автомобильный Завод
- Romanized name: OOO Lada Izhevskiy Avtomobil'nyy Zavod
- Formerly: IzhAvto
- Company type: Subsidiary
- Industry: Automotive
- Founded: 1965; 60 years ago
- Headquarters: Izhevsk, Russia
- Key people: Alexander Bogachev (General director)
- Number of employees: 1100 (2023)
- Parent: AvtoVAZ
- Website: www.ladaizhevsk.ru

Lada Izhevsk is a subsidiary of the carmaking company AvtoVAZ (since 2011) based in Izhevsk, Russia. It was formerly a subsidiary of Izmash under the IzhAvto brand. The company was given its current name in 2017.

== History ==
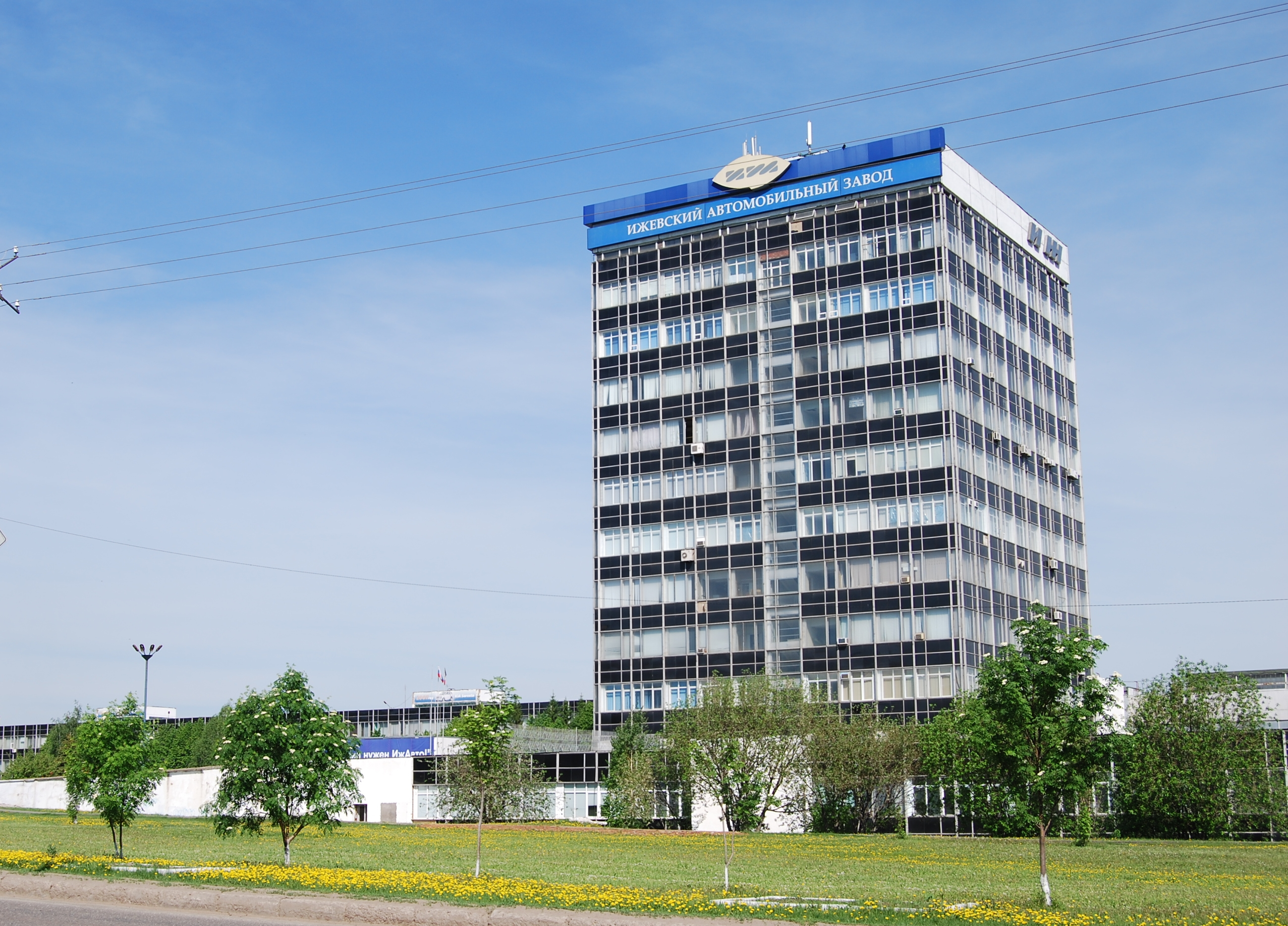
IzhAvto headquarters

The Izhevsk car factory was established in 1965. The company started on 12 December 1966 with assembling copies of Moskvitch models 408 (as the IZh 408) with parts shipped in. By the end of the year, 300 had been completed, with the number reaching 4,000 by December 1967. In December 1967, the Moskvitch 412 replaced the 408 on the assembly line (as the IZh 412).

Styling began to diverge from the AZLK originals beginning in 1970, when IZh kept two round headlamps instead of adopting Moskvitch's rectangular ones, and got a different grille. In 1971, the IZh-built 412 was redesignated 412IE. The IZh-built 412s had a reputation for being better quality than the Moskvitch originals.

In 1970, IZh designed a prototype five-door hatchback and a delivery on the 412 platform. The delivery in 1972 became the IZh 2715; it was powered by a 1,478 cc (90.2 cu in) inline four, had twin rear doors and a box-like cargo area (akin to a cube van ) and could carry a 350 kg (770 lb) load. It and a pickup (what hot rodders would call a pickoupe), announced as the 27151 in 1974, were very popular, both officially in production until 1997, with the final examples built as late as 2001. Pickups were occasionally bought as far away as South America and South Africa, but were forbidden to private owners in the Soviet Union. The 2715 delivery was used by the Soviet post office. A windowed version with rear bed seats, the 27156, appeared in 1987. Top speed was 109 km/h (68 mph) and "roadholding on wet and slippery roads rather minimal". The hatchback reached the market in 1975 as the 2125 Kombi, and it gave IZh another winning model.

=== Post-Soviet era ===
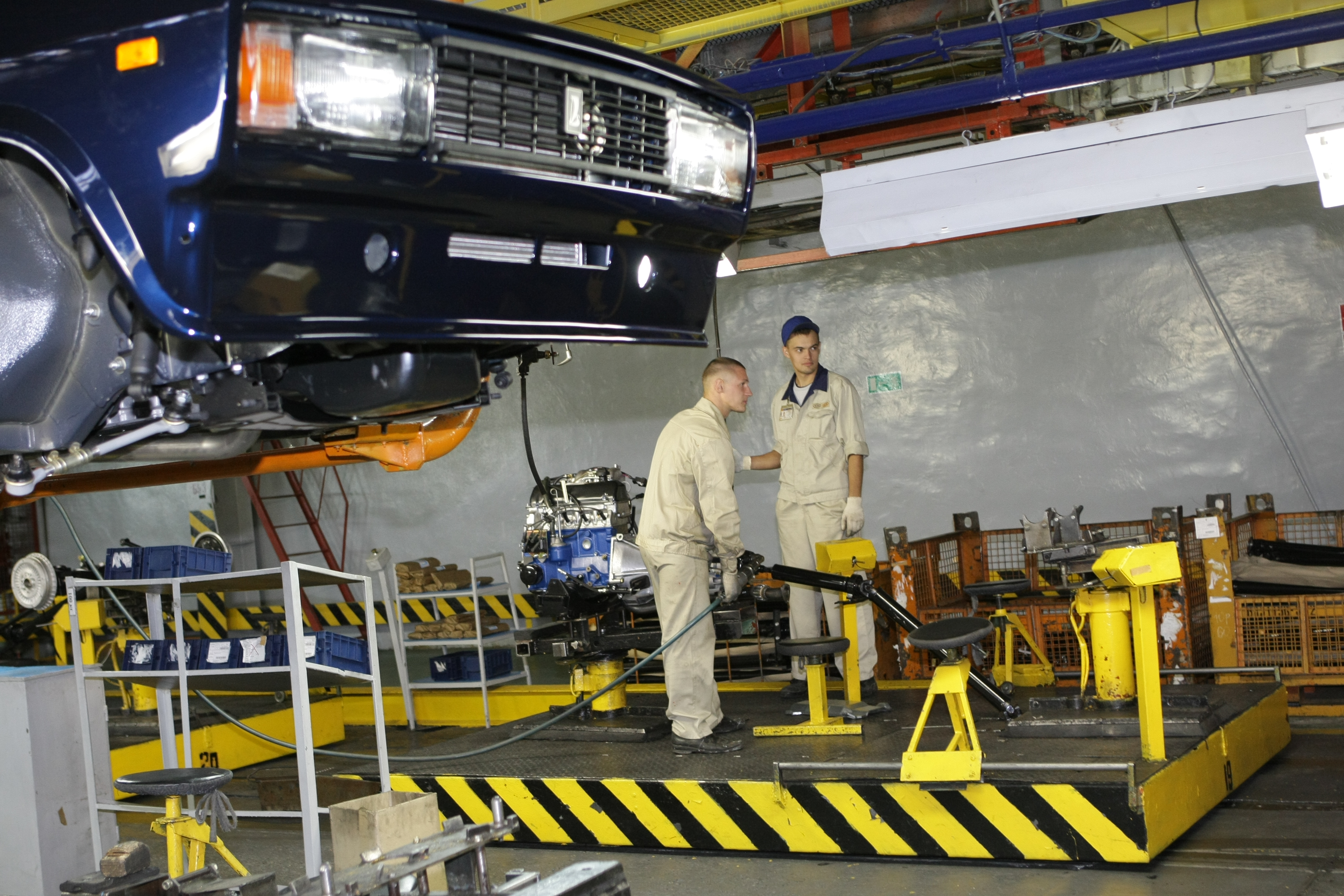
IzhAvto in 2010

In the 1990s production declined due to a lack of financing and improper managerial practices, and by 1999 the plant was producing fewer than 10,000 vehicles a year. The company became an independent subsidiary of the weapons manufacturer Izhmash in 1996, when it was established as a separate company named DAO "Izhmash-Avto". It was ultimately acquired by the SOK Group in 2000. By 2003, the plant produced 94,200 cars including the Zhiguli and the Izh Oda. The Kia Spectra sedan was produced for the Korean carmaker under a 2005 partnership agreement. IzhAvto filed for bankruptcy in 2009.

=== Subsidiary of AVTOVAZ ===
Since its acquisition by AvtoVAZ in 2010, the plant has produced Nissan and Lada models, including Lada Granta, Nissan Sentra and Nissan Tiida. The plant also became a production site of the Lada Vesta, which debuted in 2015. The decision to manufacture the Vesta in Izhevsk was taken by former AvtoVAZ CEO Bo Andersson, due to a higher perceived quality of production in the plant, compared to the group's main factory in Tolyatti. The plant built the 5 millionth car in December 2017.

In February 2022, LADA Izhevsk launched into production the new generation of LADA Vesta, but later, in accordance with AVTOVAZ new industrial strategy https://www.lada.ru/en/press-releases/120467, the production of this car was transferred to Togliatti: in March 2023 AVTOVAZ announced the start of production on LADA Vesta NG on its main production site.

In August 2022, the decision to produce electric version of LADA Largus at Izhevsk site of AVTOVAZ was taken, it is planned to start of the production of LADA e-Largus in the end of 2023 https://www.lada.ru/en/press-releases/121683

In August 2023, AVTOVAZ decided to transfer the LADA Largus family production to the Izhevsk manufacturing site. The transfer project is scheduled to complete in 2HY 2024.https://www.lada.ru/en/press-releases/121683

== Owners ==
As of spring 2012 the assets of IzhAvto were controlled by AvtoVAZ through its subsidiary United Automobile Group. On February 24, 2014 Mikhail Sergeevich Ryabov, who served as Vice President for Products and Programs at AvtoVAZ, was appointed the new CEO of United Automobile Group LLC.

On April 24, 2017 the production site of AVTOVAZ Group in Izhevsk was renamed from United Automobile Group LLC to LADA Izhevsk Automobile Plant LLC (abbreviated as LADA Izhevsk LLC).

On November 1, 2018 Denis Nosov, Director of Plastic Products Production (PPI) PJSC AVTOVAZ in Tolyatti, appointed General Director of LADA Izhevsk Automobile Plant.

Since February 22, 2023 Alexander Bogachev has taken over the position of General Director of the Lada Izhevsk automobile plant.
