= AZLK =

Soviet and Russian automobile manufacturer

- Type: Government-owned (1929–1991, 2022–present), privately owned (1991–2010)
- Industry: Automotive
- Founded: 1930
- Successor: Moskvitch OAO
- Headquarters: Moscow, Russia
- Products: cars, SUVs, pickup trucks, sports vehicles, vans, war machines
- Website: www.azlk.ru

AZLK (Russian: АЗЛК - Автомобильный завод имени Ленинского Комсомола, romanized: Avtomobilny zavod imeni Leninskogo Komsomola, lit. 'Lenin Komsomol Automobile Plant') is a Soviet and Russian automobile manufacturer (Moscow), the maker of the Moskvitch brand.

== History ==
Founded in 1930 as KIM, or Communist Youth International, the plant became MZMA (Moscow Small Car Factory) in 1939, before finally changing its name to the more familiar Avtomobilny zavod imeni Leninskogo Komsomola (AZLK), literally "Lenin Komsomol Automobile Plant" in 1969.

Beginning in 1939, the factory's passenger cars were sold under the Moskvitch (Muscovite, a person whose origin or place of residence is Moscow) brand. The plant was originally under the authority of Gorkovsky Avtomobilny Zavod (GAZ – Gorky Automobile Factory) founded at about the same time, but by 1939 it was operationally independent.

AZLK's role in the Soviet automotive industry was the production of small cars, which could be classified as anywhere from compact to mid-size. AvtoVAZ and IZh were also charged with producing vehicles in the same category as AZLK, while GAZ handled the large car and full-size segment.

Following privatization in 1991, AZLK adopted Moskvitch as its corporate name, as it had already been used on all of the company's cars dating to 1939.

=== 1929–1941 ===
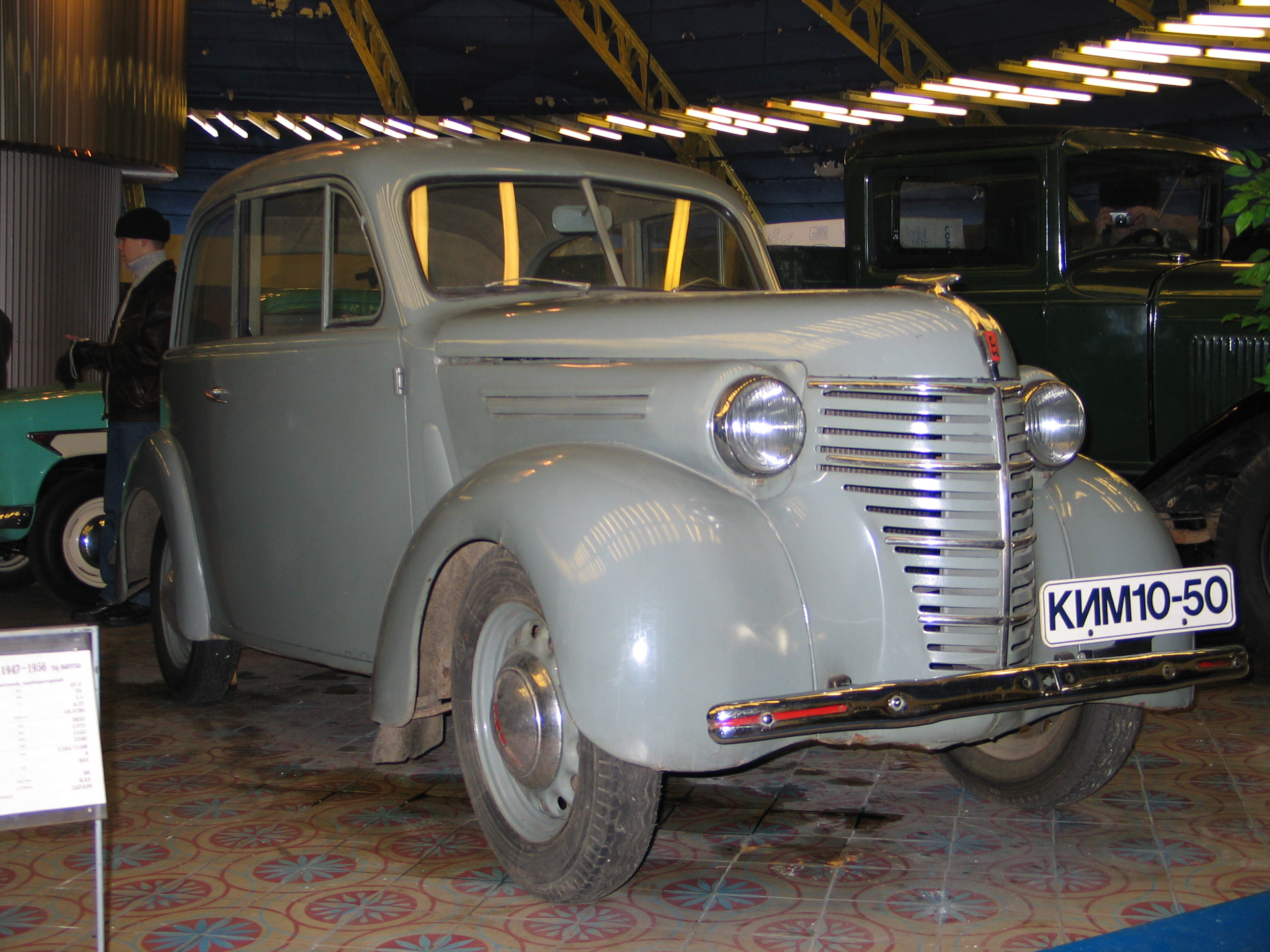
KIM 10-50

The construction of the plant called Moscow Car Assembly Factory (Russian: Московский автосборочный завод) began in 1929. In 1930 the production of Ford A and Ford AA from parts that were provided by the Ford Motor Company began. In December 1930 the plant was named KIM (Zavod imeni Kommunsticheskogo Internatsionala Molodyozhi, Russian: КИМ (Завод имени Коммунистического Интернационала Молодёжи) - Communist Youth International, literally "Factory named after Communist Youth International"), from 1930 to 1939 its official name was Moscow Car Assembly Factory named after KIM (Московский автосборочный завод имени КИМ) and then from 1939 until the beginning of the Great Patriotic War it was called Moscow Car Factory named after KIM (Московский автомобильный завод имени КИМ). In 1933, the production of the Ford A and Ford AA ceased. On August 1, 1933, the factory became a subsidiary of GAZ and produced GAZ AA using parts from GAZ. In 1939, KIM was no longer the subsidiary of GAZ and in the following year it started to produce their first own and original model, the KIM 10-50 (two-door saloon), inspired by the Ford Prefect. There was also a convertible known as the KIM 10–51. Around 500 cars of both versions were made before the beginning of the Great Patriotic War. In the early 1941, approximately 2 prototypes of the KIM 10-52 were built. It was a four-door saloon which was the major difference between the KIM 10-52 and the KIM 10–50. There were plans for mass production of this car but they were interrupted by the beginning of the war.

=== Post-war years ===
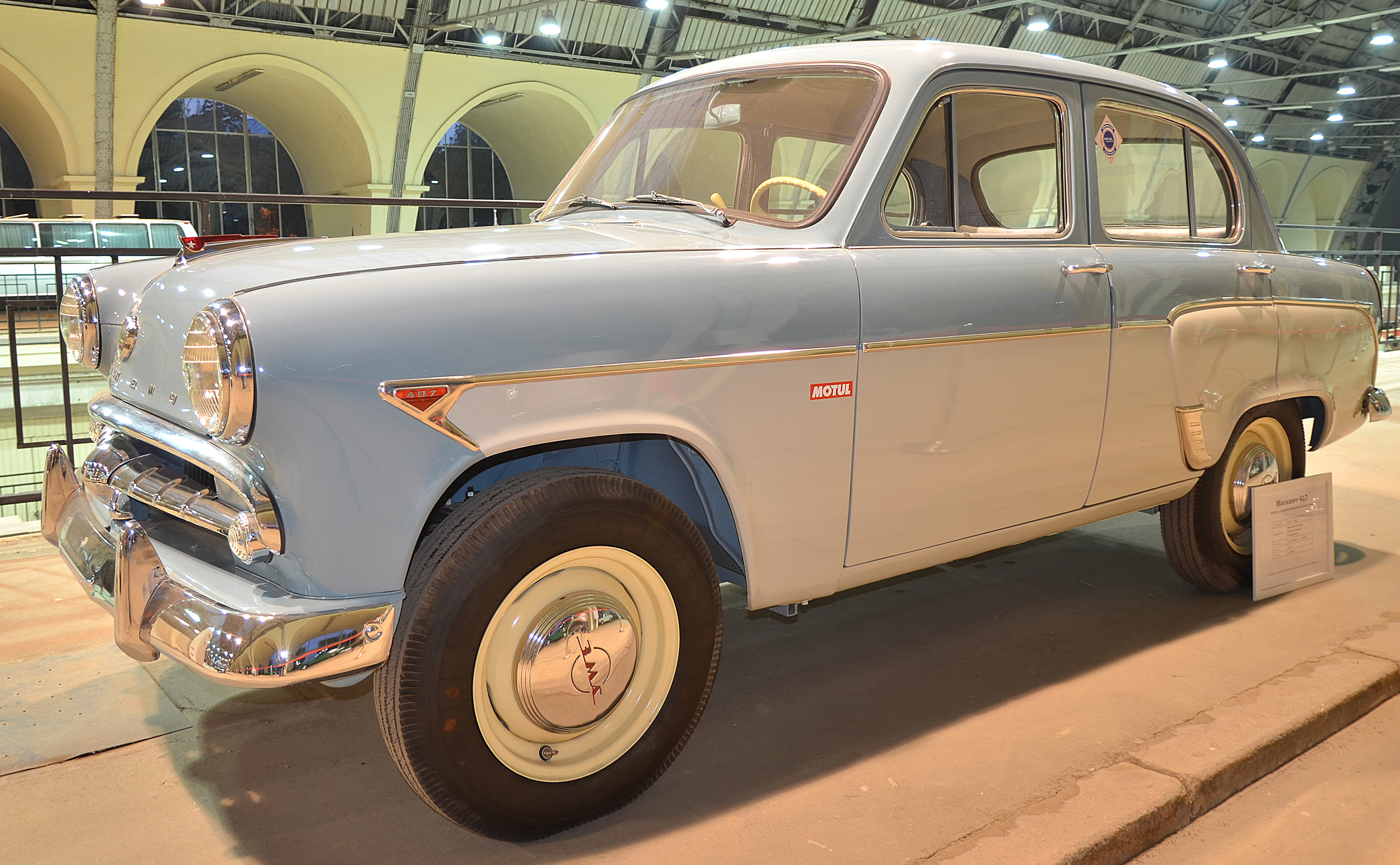
Moskvitch-402

In May 1945, the Council of People's Commissars of the USSR adopted a decision on the production of small cars named "Moskvich". The plant was renamed to the "Small Car Plant" (PCA), and later again to "Moscow Plant of Small Cars" (MZMA, Moskovskiy Zavod Malolitrazhniy Avtomobiliy). In agreement with Opel, the plant started to produce the Moskvich-400 passenger car based on the Opel Kadett. In 1956, MZMA launched into production its own and highly successful model, the Moskvitch-402, that was followed by the upgraded and restyled versions known as the M-403 and M-407 and later by the brand new Moskvitch-408 series. On May 18, 1967, the company produced its one millionth car. The same year, the first new Moskvitch 412 appeared. The M-407 was the first Soviet automotive export to be truly successful in the West. Up to half of all M-407 production was exported for a number of years, mainly to the Eastern Bloc countries, Norway, Finland, and France. Later models also proved a good value in Britain, Finland, and Norway, for instance, and in 1968, 55% of production was for export.

The name of the company was changed from MZMA to AZLK in October 1968 in honour of the Lenin Komsomol's fiftieth anniversary.

During the 1960s, AZLK proposed the M-415 and M-416 four-wheel drive vehicles. They were not proceeded with, either.

In 1970, AZLK updated the M-412's styling, with the 353. Using M-412 mechanicals, it was larger but recognizably related. The 355 of 1972 was larger still, with 23 cm (9.1 in) greater length, 14 cm (5.5 in) more wheelbase, and 8 cm (3.1 in) more width. This made both the interior and the boot noticeably larger. The 355 was further developed into the 356 between 1973 and 1975, with "much bolder front end styling", new suspension, and an enlarged 1,799 cc (109.8 cu in) version of the DM engine with twin Zenith carburetors, giving 103 hp (77 kW; 104 PS), with a Borg-Warner transmission planned. 1600cc and 1700cc engines were also planned. None was built.

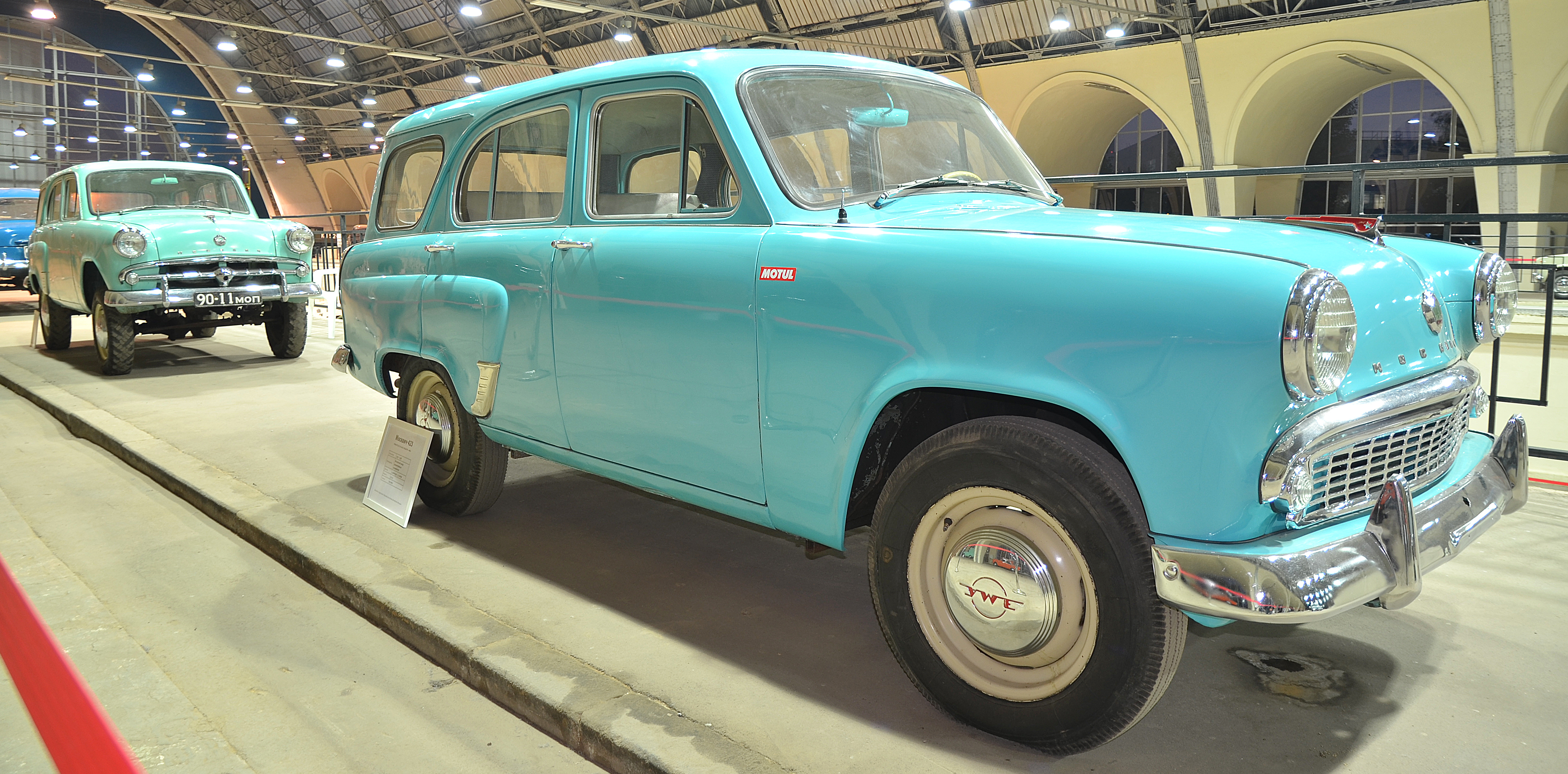
Moskvitch-423

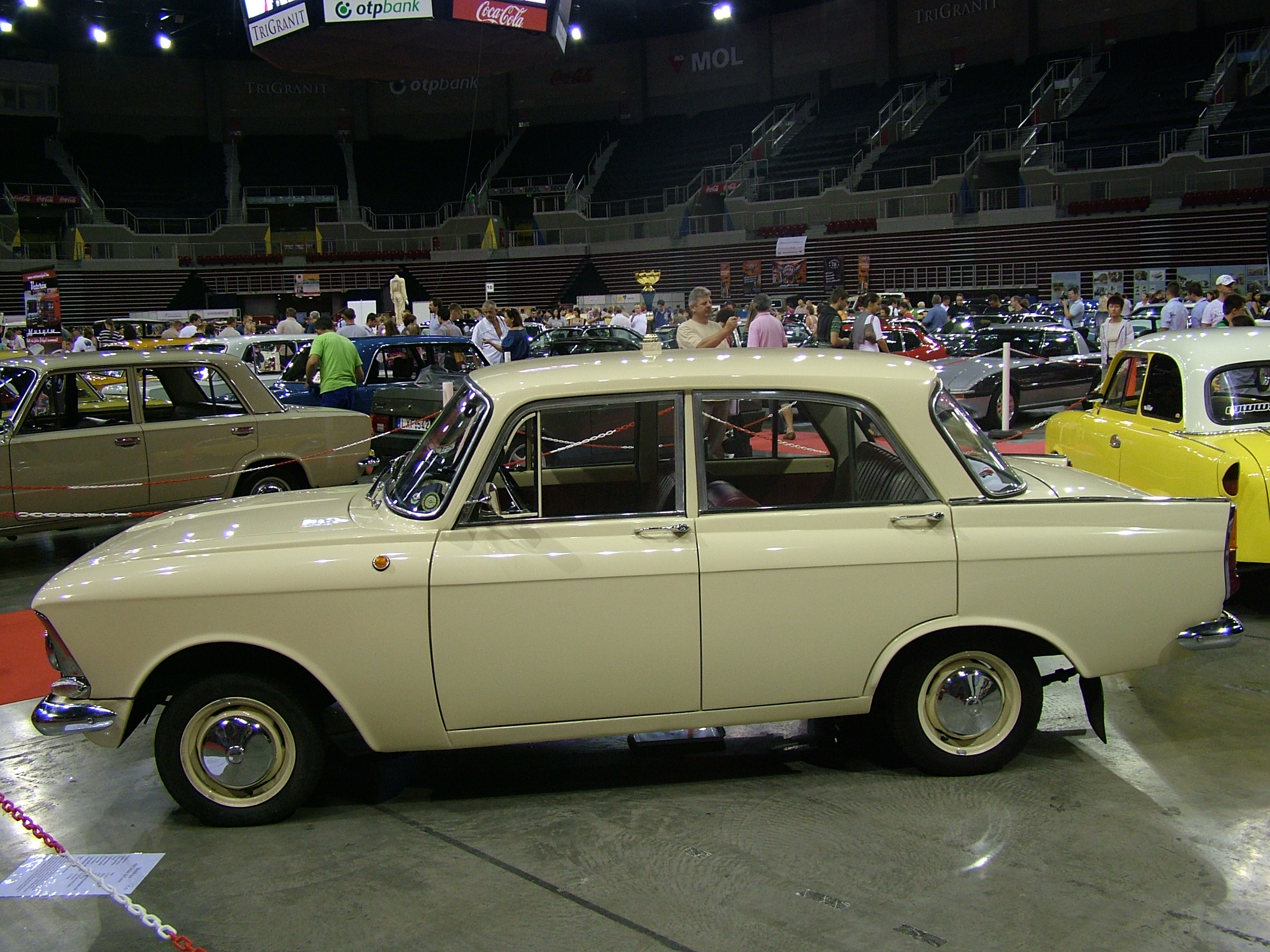
Moskvitch-408

AZLK in August 1974 sold its two millionth unit.

In order to replace the 408 and M-412, in 1975 Moskvitch designed a four-door fastback C1 (Series One), with a 1,702 cc (103.9 cu in) version of the DM straight four, offering 81 hp (60 kW; 82 PS), to give a top speed of 93 mph (150 km/h). Unlike the M-412, it had MacPherson struts in front and independent trailing arms in back. It did not reach the company's goals and was never built, but inspired the four door C2 in 1976, which never passed the mockup stage, and the C3, which was very similar but a five-door hatchback. The engine would have been fitted at an angle from the vertical (like the Chrysler slant six). None of these projects reached production.

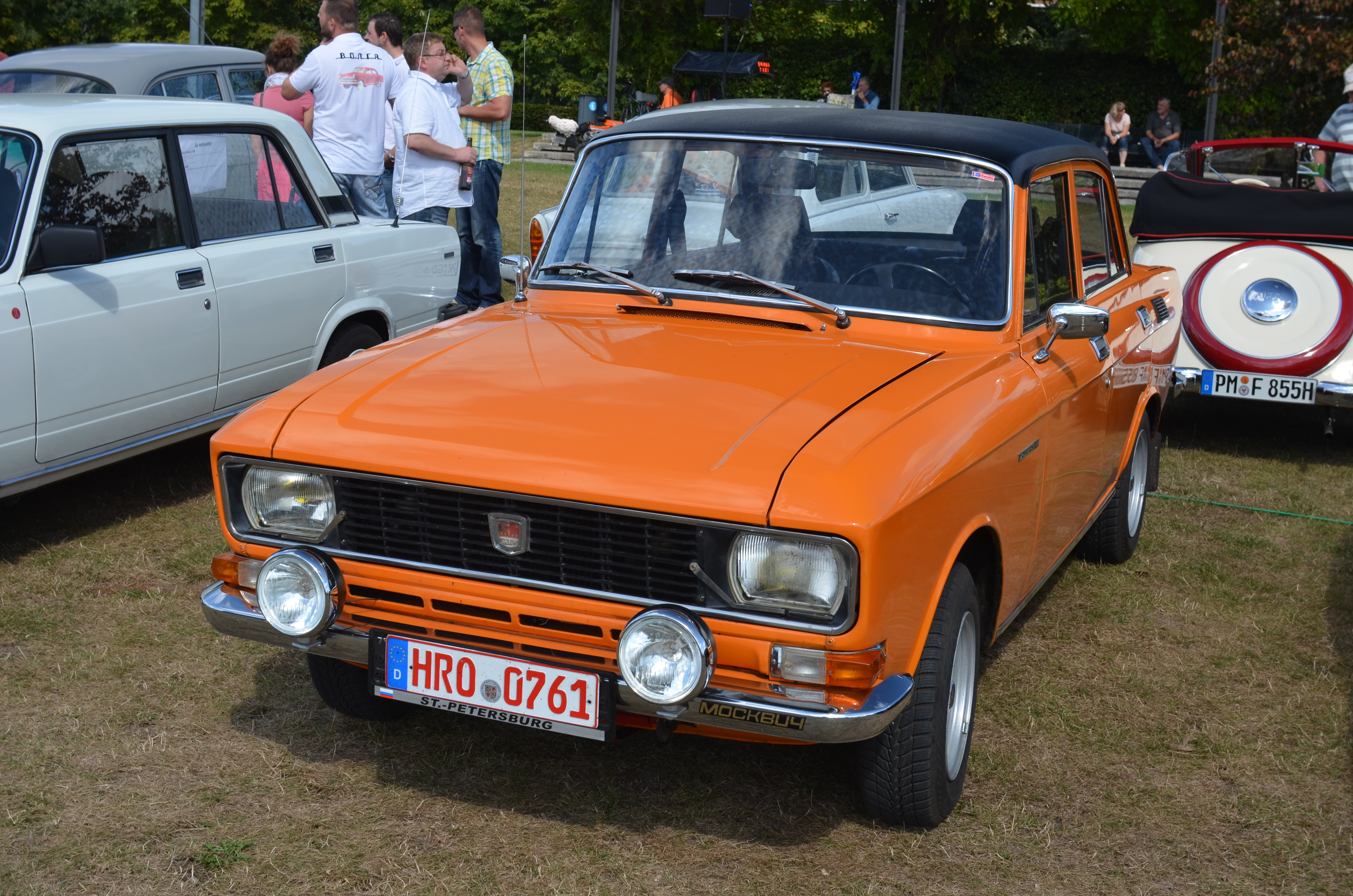
Moskvitch-2140

The M-408 and M-412 were discontinued in December 1975, replaced by facelifted variants, the 50 hp (37 kW; 51 PS) 1,358 cc (82.9 cu in) 2138 (1360) and 75 hp (56 kW; 76 PS) 1,478 cc (90.2 cu in) 2140 (1500), which entered production the next month. In fact, the M-2138 and M-2140 were built in stages: M-412 bodies with the boot lid, rear wings, and tail of the M-2140; then M-2140 bodies with M-412 doors; and then, early in 1976, all-M-2140s. These "hybrid" models are now very rare. The M-21381 and M-21401 were offered as ambulance models, also, as well as the right-hand drive M-21402. In addition, there was a "rural" M-21406, with a low-compression 68 hp (51 kW; 69 PS) engine. (This same engine, in the standard model, earned the designation M-2140D.)

They were joined in 1976 by the 1,358 cc (82.9 cu in)-powered 2136 and 1,478 cc (90.2 cu in)-engined M-2137 estate; these were sold in much smaller numbers, the M-2136 surviving only until 1977. There were also two sedan delivery variants, the M-2733 (1,358 cc (82.9 cu in)) and M-2734 (1,478 cc (90.2 cu in)). A small number of pickups (M-27334 and M-27344, with (1,358 cc (82.9 cu in)) and (1,478 cc (90.2 cu in)), respectively); these weren't produced for a long time, either. By the 1980s, the deliveries had virtually disappeared, as well, because AZLK simply could not keep up with a demand for saloons.

Although the M-2138 and M-2140 were sold in Eastern Europe and exported to Belgium and Finland, where they were sold under the Scaldia marque, they were being gradually pushed off the market by a large variety of cars offered by AvtoVAZ. In response, Moskvitch launched into production a brand new and much more modern rear-wheel drive car with a roomy interior in 1986, the Moskvitch-2141, that was often upgraded and restyled during the period of its production.

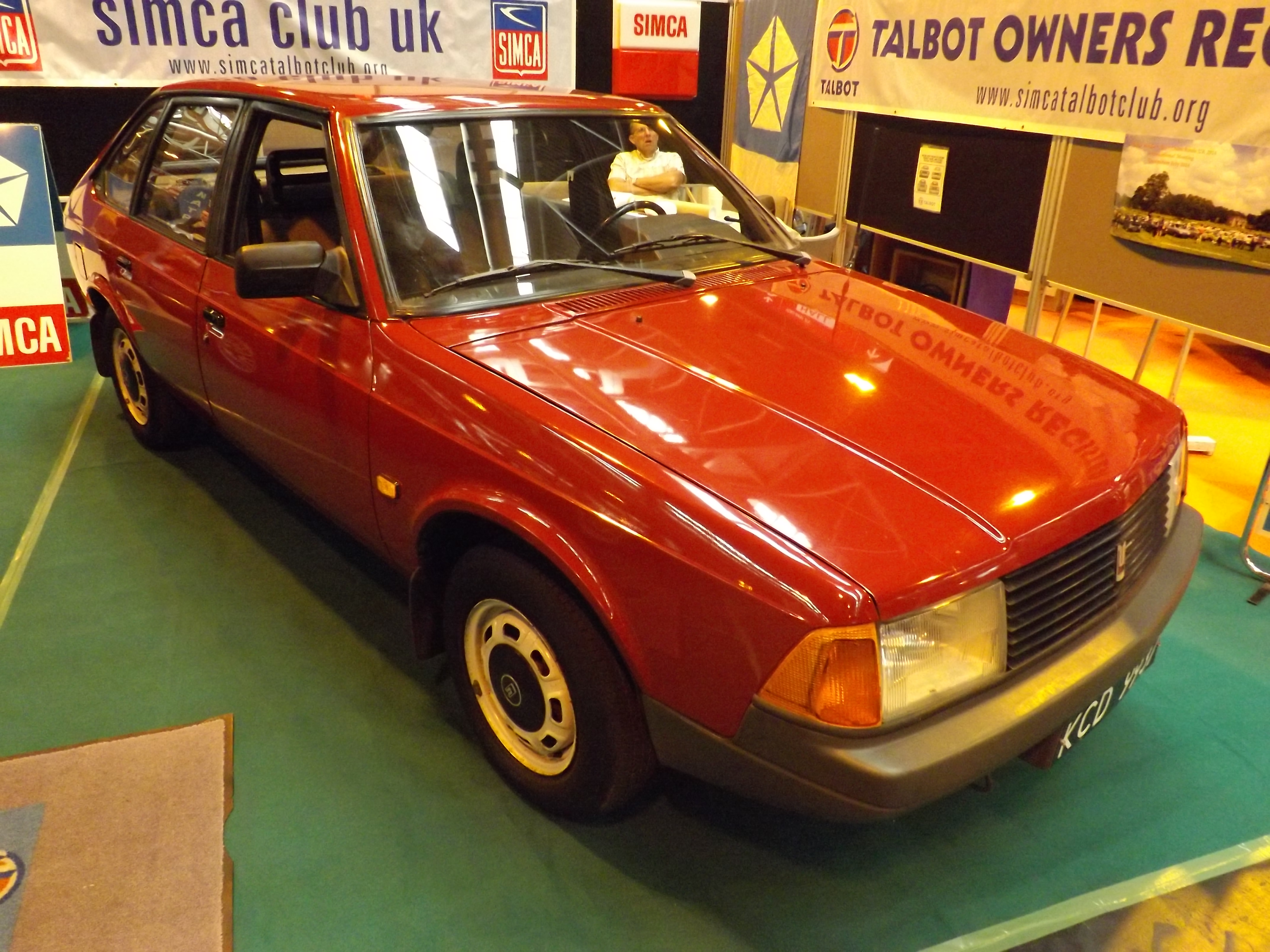
Moskvitch-2141

=== Post-Soviet period ===
In the early 1990s AZLK still remained one of the largest auto companies in the USSR. Design and experimental work was prepared to create a new model car (sedan M-2142) and an engine plant.

As of 2022, the brand restarted production in the Russian market with the use of licensed Chinese vehicles making use of a factory that was once owned by Renault.

== Alternative names ==
- Moskvitch Stock Venture (Russian: АО Москвич, from 1991 until bankruptcy in 2006)
- AZLK (Russian: АЗЛК, from 1968 to 1991, the abbreviation means Automobile Plant named after the Leninist Komsomol)
- ZMA, or MZMA (Russian: ЗМА, Russian: МЗМА, from 1945 to 1968, the abbreviation stands for (Moscow) Plant of Small Automobiles)
- KIM (Russian: КИМ, from 1939 to 1941, the name means Moscow Automobile Plant named after the Young Communist International)
