= Moskvitch 433/434 =

Van variants of the Moskvitch 408 and 412

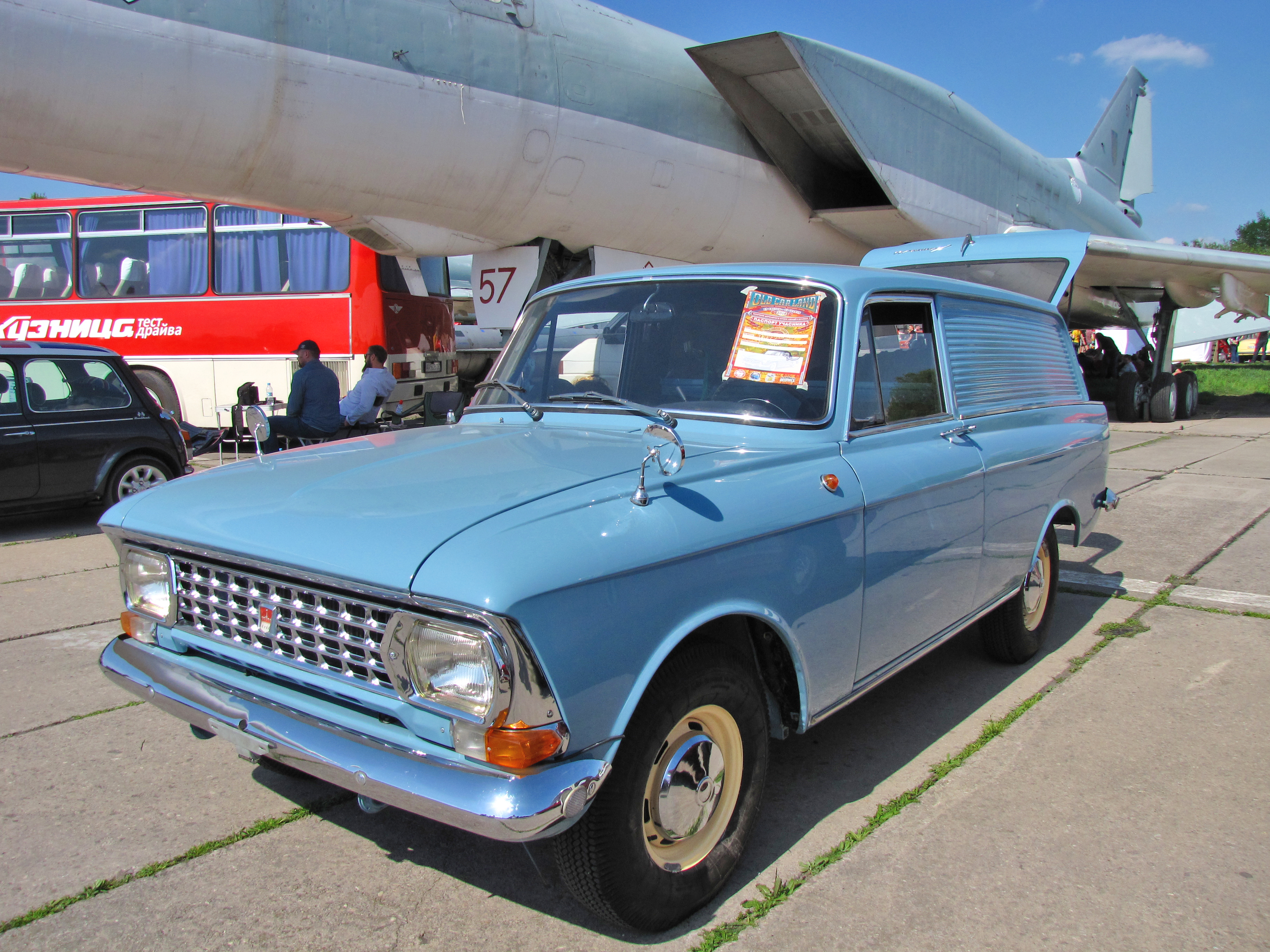
- Moskvitch 433P (for left-hand traffic)

Overview
- Manufacturer: MZMA/AZLK
- Production: 1966–1976
- Assembly: Moscow, Soviet Union; Izhevsk, Soviet Union

Body and chassis
- Class: light commercial vehicle
- Body style: 3-door panel van
- Related: Moskvitch 408, Moskvitch 412, Moskvitch 2733/2734, Moskvitch 426/427

Powertrain
- Engine: straight engine, carbureted: 433: 1,358 cm³, 50 hp; 434: 1,478 cm³, 75 hp
- Transmission: 4-speed manual
- Hybrid drivetrain: front-mounted longitudinal engine, rear-wheel drive

Dimensions
- Wheelbase: 2,400 mm (94 in)
- Length: 4,166 mm (164.0 in)
- Width: 1,550 mm (61 in)
- Height: approx. 1,480 mm (58 in)
- Curb weight: 1,045 kg (2,304 lb)

Chronology
- Predecessor: Moskvitch 430/432
- Successor: Moskvitch 2733/2734; Izh 2715

Moskvitch 433 and 434 were light commercial vehicles with a panel van body produced by the Soviet MZMA/AZLK factories from 1966 to 1976. They were variants of the Moskvitch 408 and Moskvitch 412 passenger cars, distinguished primarily by their engines.

== History and design ==
The Moskvitch 433 was a van derivative of the Moskvitch 408 passenger car, which introduced the third generation of Moskvitch vehicles in the mid-1960s. It replaced the earlier Moskvitch 432 van, based on a 1950s model. Production of the van variant began in late 1966, two years after the sedan 408 debuted. Its powertrain featured the same outdated and relatively weak 1,358 cm³ engine, derived from the pre-war German Opel Kadett K38. From late 1968, the Moskvitch 434 was produced concurrently, equipped with a more powerful 1,470 cm³ engine delivering 75 hp, sourced from the new Moskvitch 412 and inspired by a BMW engine.

The vans' body resembled the Moskvitch 426/427 station wagon but was a three-door design. Instead of side windows in the cargo area, they had full-length, horizontally ribbed metal panels that added structural rigidity. Initially, the rear door was split, with sections opening upward and downward (typically without a window in the upper part). From late 1972, it was replaced with a single upward-opening door with a window. A partition with a small window (later partial) separated the driver's compartment from the cargo area. Unlike the estate, the spare wheel was stored behind the right front seat, allowing a slightly lower cargo floor.

The vans had reinforced rear suspension compared to the station wagon, using leaf springs of the same length (shorter than the sedan's) but with different leaf sizes and rear mounting. Like the station wagon, they adopted the main gear from the older 432 model with a 4.55 ratio and slightly larger 6.50×13" tyres. The cargo floor was 550 mm high, with a maximum length of 1,615 mm, width of 1,230 mm (935 mm between wheel arches), and height ranging from 800 to 890 mm. The cargo volume was 1.5 m³, with a payload capacity of 400 kg on paved roads and 250 kg on rough roads.

Both models were produced simultaneously due to limited production of the 1.5-litre engine. The simpler 1.4-litre engine was better suited for less populated regions with limited service networks. Externally, the 433 and 434 were identical, like the 408 and 412 passenger cars. Early models had two (or four for export) round headlights. Unlike sedans and station wagons, the vans standardly featured two wing-mounted side mirrors. Both models underwent gradual upgrades in line with the sedans. The front bench seat was replaced with individual seats, and the gear lever and handbrake were relocated from the steering column and dashboard to the floor.

In early 1970, the front bodywork was modernised, following the sedans. Round headlights were replaced with rectangular ones in hexagonal chrome frames. To meet European safety trends, the new body included front crumple zones. From February 1969, the metal dashboard and interior elements received soft polyurethane padding, and by 1971, the entire dashboard was polyurethane-covered.

== Production and use ==
The Moskvitch 433 and 434 vans were manufactured at the AZLK plant in Moscow until the first quarter of 1976, when they were succeeded by the updated 2733/2734 models. Additionally, from 1968 to 1973, the Moskvitch 434 was produced at the Izhmash plant in Izhevsk, differing slightly with a unique radiator grille and retaining round headlights. Approximately 104,000 units were built in Moscow and over 35,000 in Izhevsk. In 1972, Izhevsk's production of the 434 peaked at 17,721 units, but from 1973, it was replaced by the Izh 2715, a taller van with greater payload, also based on the Moskvitch 412. Compared to the Izh 2715, the Moskvitch vans offered better cargo compartment sealing, suitable for certain goods, and lower fuel consumption due to a more aerodynamic body.

In the Soviet Union, vans were classified as means of production and were not sold to private individuals but allocated to state enterprises, socialised trade, services, and organisations. From 1975 to the late 1980s, private registration of such vehicles was prohibited. Nicknamed pirozhok (little pie) for their role in delivering food items, the Moskvitch vans were also exported, primarily to Eastern Bloc countries but also to Western markets, where their low price was competitive. In 1969, a Moskvitch 433 in the UK cost £475, compared to £699 for the station wagon. Export versions included better-equipped models (designated E), right-hand-drive variants for left-hand traffic (P), and versions for warm climates (Ju, meaning "southern").

Non-standard pickup variants of the Moskvitch 433 and 434 were also created, often converted from vans for internal factory transport (using defective bodies, including sedans) or modified by Western importers for market needs. The factory pickup variant of the 434 was officially designated Moskvitch 434G.

== Bibliography ==
- "Moskwicz-408" Москвич-408 [Moskvitch-408]. Awtoliegendy SSSR (in Russian). 12. Moscow: DeAgostini. 2009. ISSN 2071-095X.
- "Moskwicz-433/434" Москвич-433/434 [Moskvitch-433/434]. Awtoliegendy SSSR (in Russian). 92. Moscow: DeAgostini. 2012. ISSN 2071-095X.
- Jonies, Siergiej (2014). "Moskwicz-2734" Москвич-2734 [Moskvitch-2734]. Awtoliegendy SSSR (in Russian). 137. Moscow: DeAgostini. ISSN 2071-095X.
