= Izh 2125 =

Izh 2125/21251 Kombi
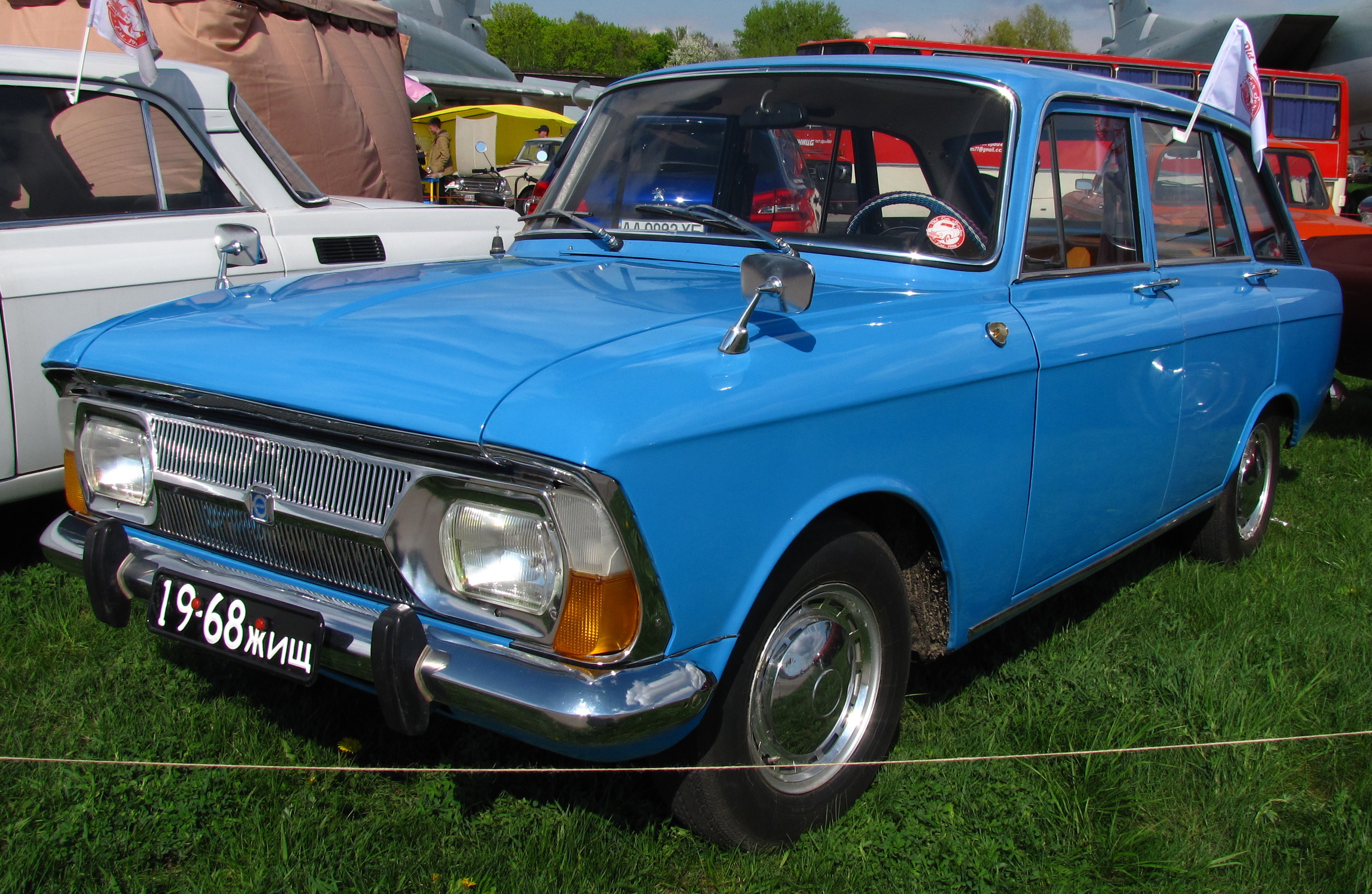

Overview
- Manufacturer: IZh
- Also called: Moskvitch 1500 Kombi
- Production: 1973–1997
- Assembly: Soviet Union/Russia: Izhevsk

Body and chassis
- Class: Small family car
- Body style: 5-door liftback
- Related: Izh 412; Izh 2715

Powertrain
- Engine: UZAM 412

Chronology
- Successor: Izh 2126

The Izh-2125 "Kombi" (Russian: ИЖ-2125 Комби, short for "combination") is a small family car produced by the Soviet/Russian car manufacturer IZh from 1973 to 1997. It is the first liftback of Russian/Soviet origin. It was based on an Izhevsk-modified Moskvitch 412, with the first prototype released in 1966 as a small family car. Modern retrospectives often consider the Izh-2125 to be the first Soviet hatchback, released about a decade before the well-known VAZ-2108 Lada Samara, though the car actually possesses a station wagon body with heavily sloped D-pillar; in modern Russian literature the car is usually referred to as a liftback. In Soviet literature, "Kombi" was used both as the Izh-2125's own nameplate, added as a badge to its tailgate after the 1982 facelift, and as the definition of its body style at the same time, which was also used for other cars with similar architecture like the Saab 900 combi coupé line.

== History ==
The Kombi was a notable sales success within the USSR between 1974 and 1980 due to its durability, off-road capability, and increased carrying capacity. It was the first Izh car sold for export. Its popularity was also helped by limited competition – station wagon variants of the Lada, Moscow-built Moskvitch, and Volga were in short supply and not as easy to buy as the Kombi.

In 1978, the Kombi underwent a minor revision, receiving front disc brakes along with the Izh Moskvitch-412, which have been standard for AZLK's 2140-series Moskvitch models since their debut in 1976; additionally, the grille was now painted black, though its actual design and the rectangular headlights inside of it remained unchanged. From this point onward, the Kombi was sometimes known as "Izh-21251" in internal documentation, repair manuals and other official materials, though it was not renamed in marketing and public-facing documentation for four more years. In February 1982, the Kombi received a facelift, along with the Izh-produced Moskvitch-412 and Izh 2715 panel van, officially and fully renamed into Izh-21251. The chrome grille with East German VER headlights (the exact same units as the Wartburg 353 used; the Izh-2125 was the only Izhevsk model to use them) was replaced with a black-painted metal grille with round headlights, the original logo with white circle in a blue square was replaced with a "ИЖ" wordmark in white font, the side markers/turn signals units were also slightly changed, and the car received new recessed door handles, identical to those on the Moskvitch 2140 line, but positioned lower on the door panel.

The modernised Izh 2125 sold into the 1990s. As the Soviet Union collapsed, IZh was first privatized as the open joint stock company "Izhevsk" and slowly started converting their automotive production lines to other kinds of manufacture, such as firearms. In 1995–96, when AZLK's revenue decreased drastically, the company was partially reacquired by AutoVAZ and renamed "IZhAuto". AvtoVAZ managers then discontinued all of Izh's previous models and ran their own ones into production. An all-new hatchback was introduced, called the Izh 2126 "Oda," and it ultimately replaced the Kombi.

== Kalashnikov CV-1 ==
On August 23, 2018, the arms manufacturer Kalashnikov presented an electric car with exterior design closely based on that of the Izh-2125. The range on one charge was claimed to be 350 km, but nothing else was ever heard of this.

== Gallery ==
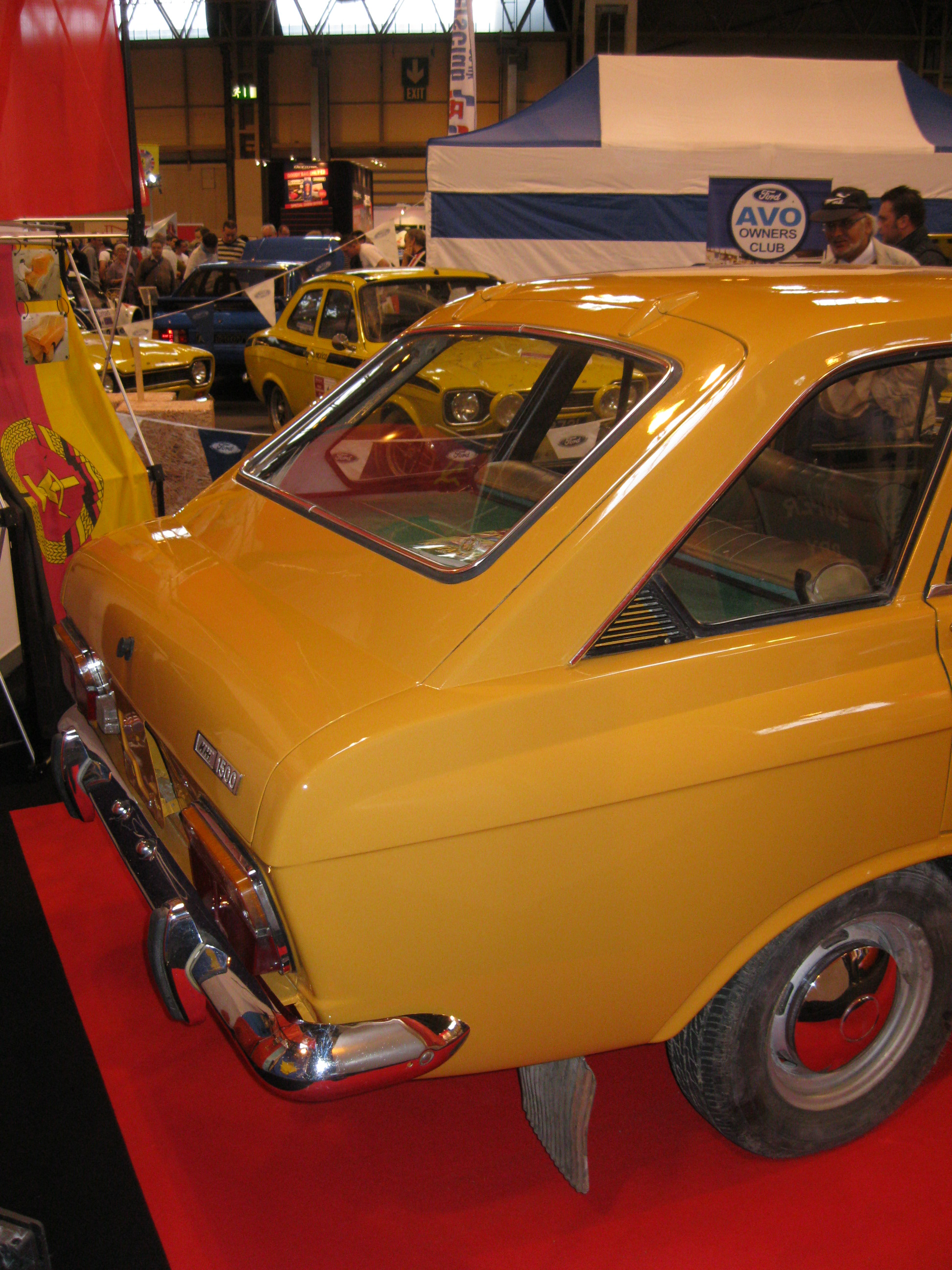
Rear view. The rear was identical on all models. The badge says "ИЖ 1500", which indicates that this is a pre-facelift model.

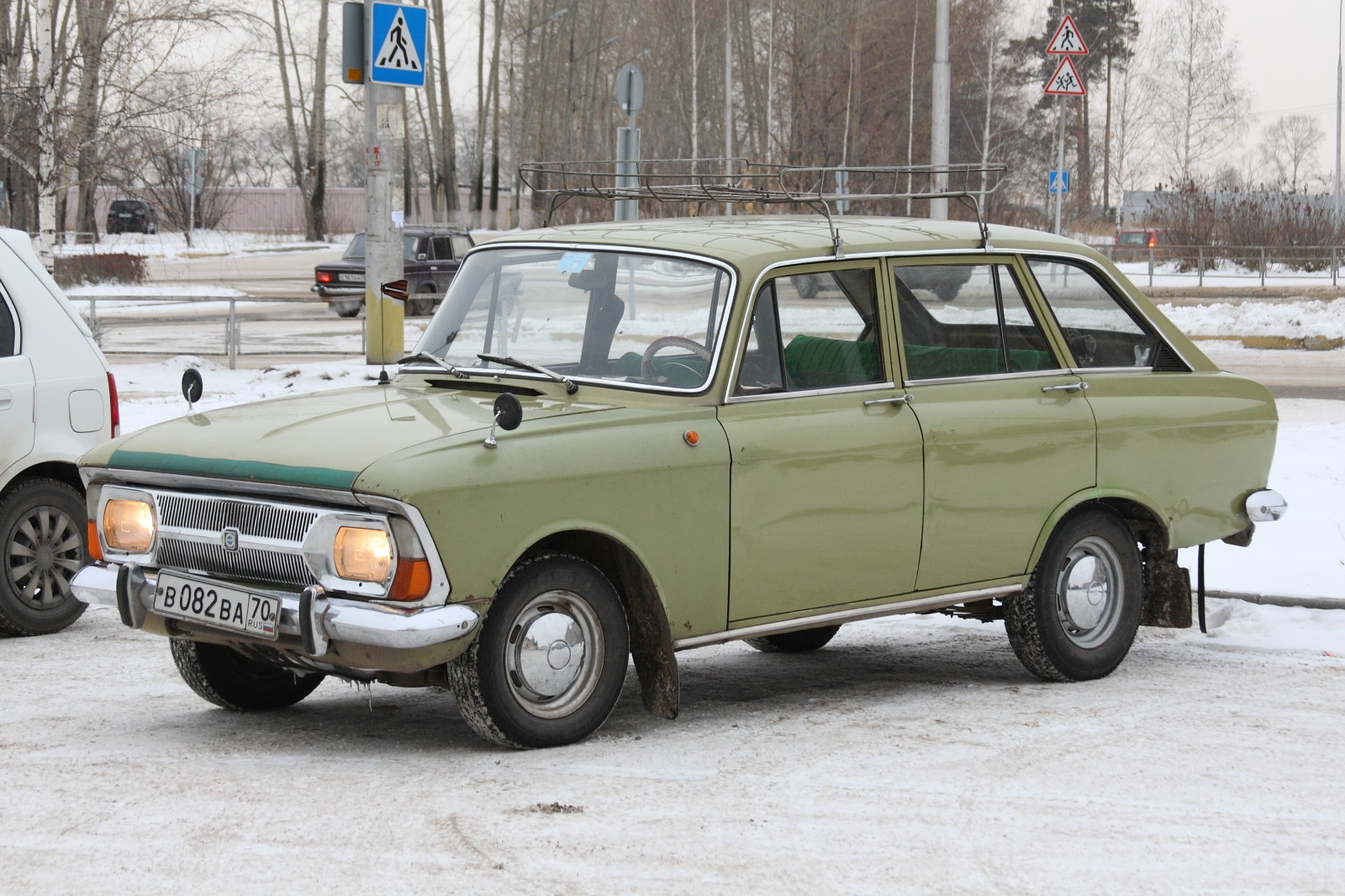
Pre-1982 Izh-2125, showing a chrome grille similar to that of the 412, but unlike it, the Kombi had vertical side markers/turn signals units from its debut, not the 1982 facelift. The round mirrors are a very early type used in 1973–1975.

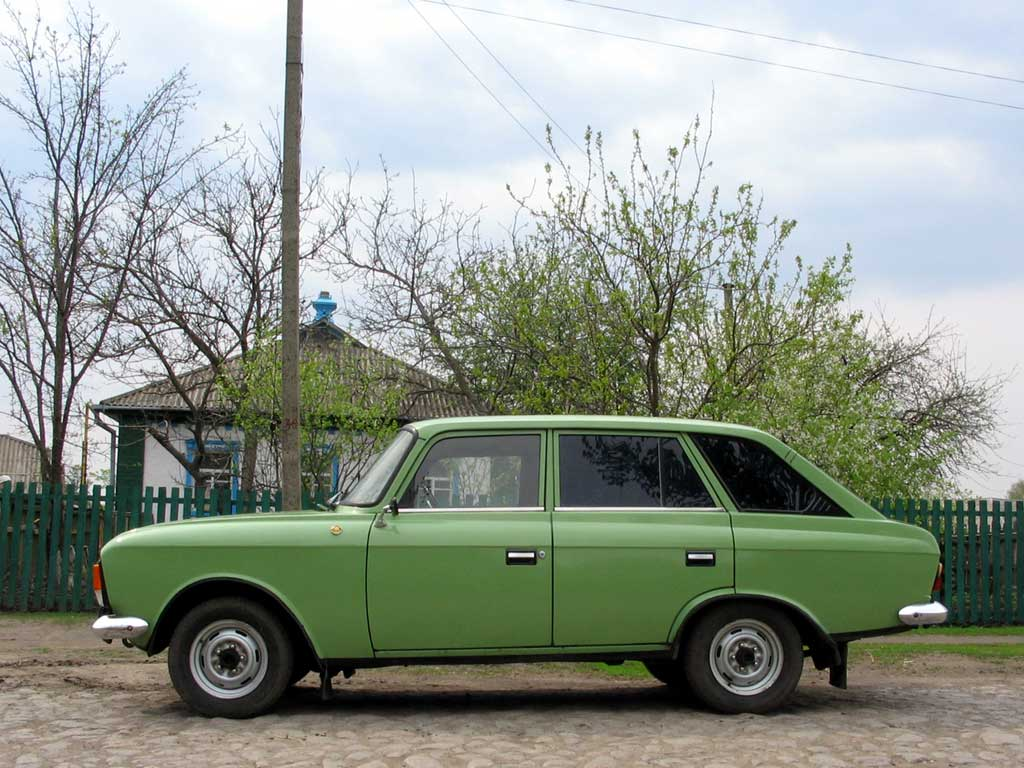
Post-1982 Izh-21251, with recessed door handles.

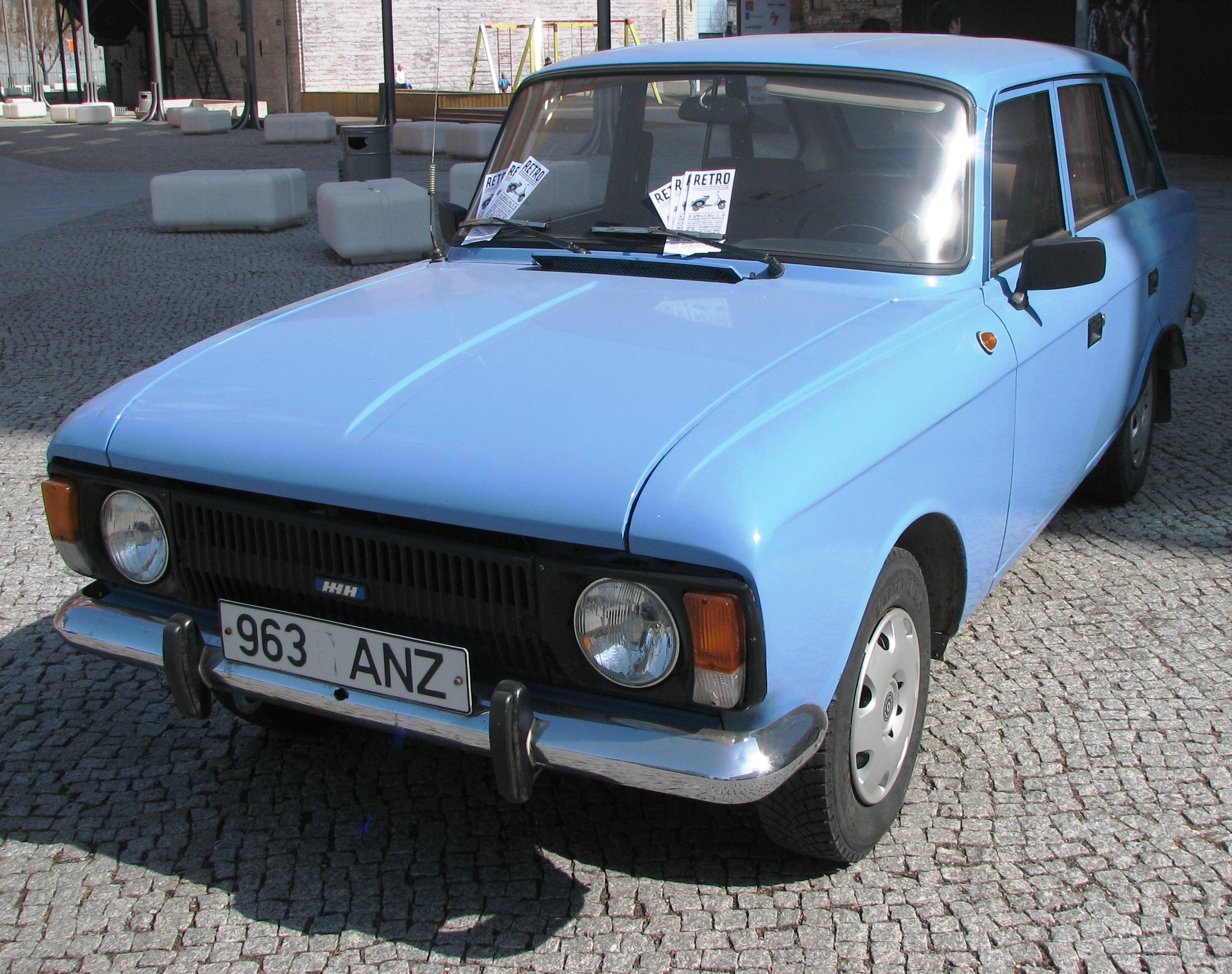
Post-1982 (Izh-21251) grille, where the metal elements were painted black and the round headlights replaced the rectangular units.
