= Izh 2715 =

Family of light commercial vehicles produced by Lada Izhevsk

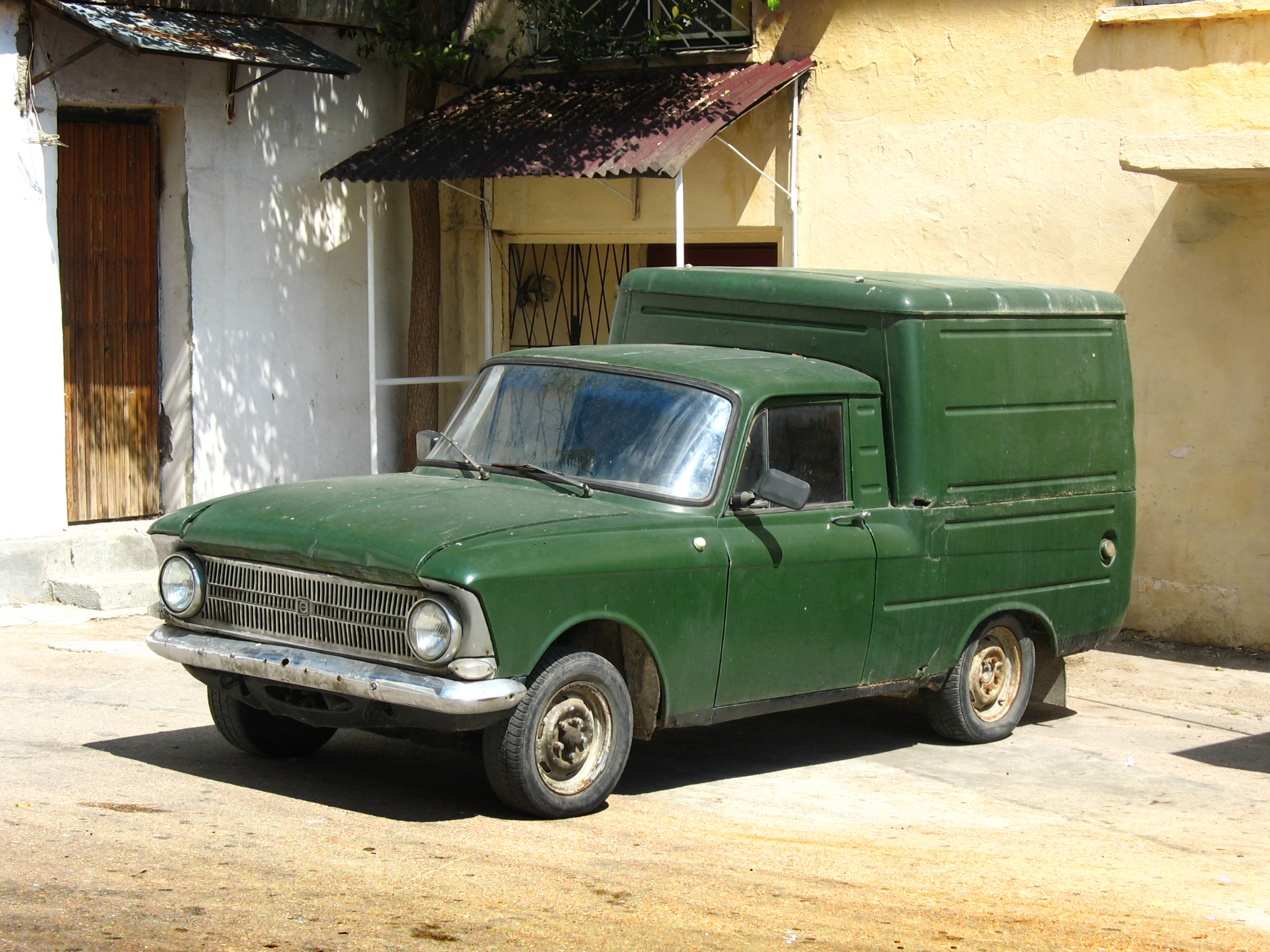
- Izh 2715

Overview
- Manufacturer: IZh
- Also called: Izh 1500 GR; Moskvitch 1500 Gr; Elite Pick Up
- Production: 1972–2001
- Assembly: Soviet Union/Russia: Izhevsk

Body and chassis
- Class: light commercial vehicle
- Body style: 3-door panel van 2-door pickup truck
- Related: Moskvitch 412

Powertrain
- Engine: petrol engine, 1,478 cm³, 75 or 67 hp
- Transmission: 4-speed, manual
- Hybrid drivetrain: longitudinal front engine, rear-wheel drive

Dimensions
- Wheelbase: 2,400 mm (94 in)
- Length: 4,130 mm (163 in)
- Width: 1,590 mm (63 in)
- Height: panel van: 1,825 mm (71.9 in) pickup truck: 1,470 mm (58 in)
- Curb weight: 1,015 kg (2,238 lb)

Chronology
- Predecessor: Moskvitch 433/434
- Successor: Izh 2717

The Izh 2715 (Russian: ИЖ-2715) is a family of light commercial vehicles with panel van and pickup truck body styles, produced by the Soviet, and later Russian, Lada Izhevsk (IzhAvto, initially Izhmash) with minimal changes over a span of 29 years, from 1972 to 2001. They were structurally based on the Moskvitch 412 passenger car and powered by a 1.5-liter engine. These vehicles were the most common light commercial vehicles in the Soviet Union and, from the late 1980s, were also available to private users. They were also exported to other countries, including Western nations.

== Development history ==
=== Emergence of the van and the start of production ===
Between 1968 and 1973, Lada Izhevsk in Izhevsk produced the Moskvitch 433/434 van, which was developed by the Moscow-based Moskvitch factory and based on the Moskvitch 412 passenger car, also produced at the plant. This van featured a three-door body style similar to the station wagon version (Moskvitch 426/427), with a low roofline and a rear hatch that opened upwards, making it difficult to access the cargo area and reducing the vehicle's practicality. The engineers in Izhevsk independently initiated efforts to enhance the vehicle’s usability, and by 1970, prototypes of a utility vehicle based on the Moskvitch were developed. These prototypes featured a body cut off just behind the driver's cabin, above the rear wheels, and replaced with a rectangular cuboid structure (Izh-6F) or a cargo bed (Izh-6G). However, this van had a high center of gravity and required further modifications.

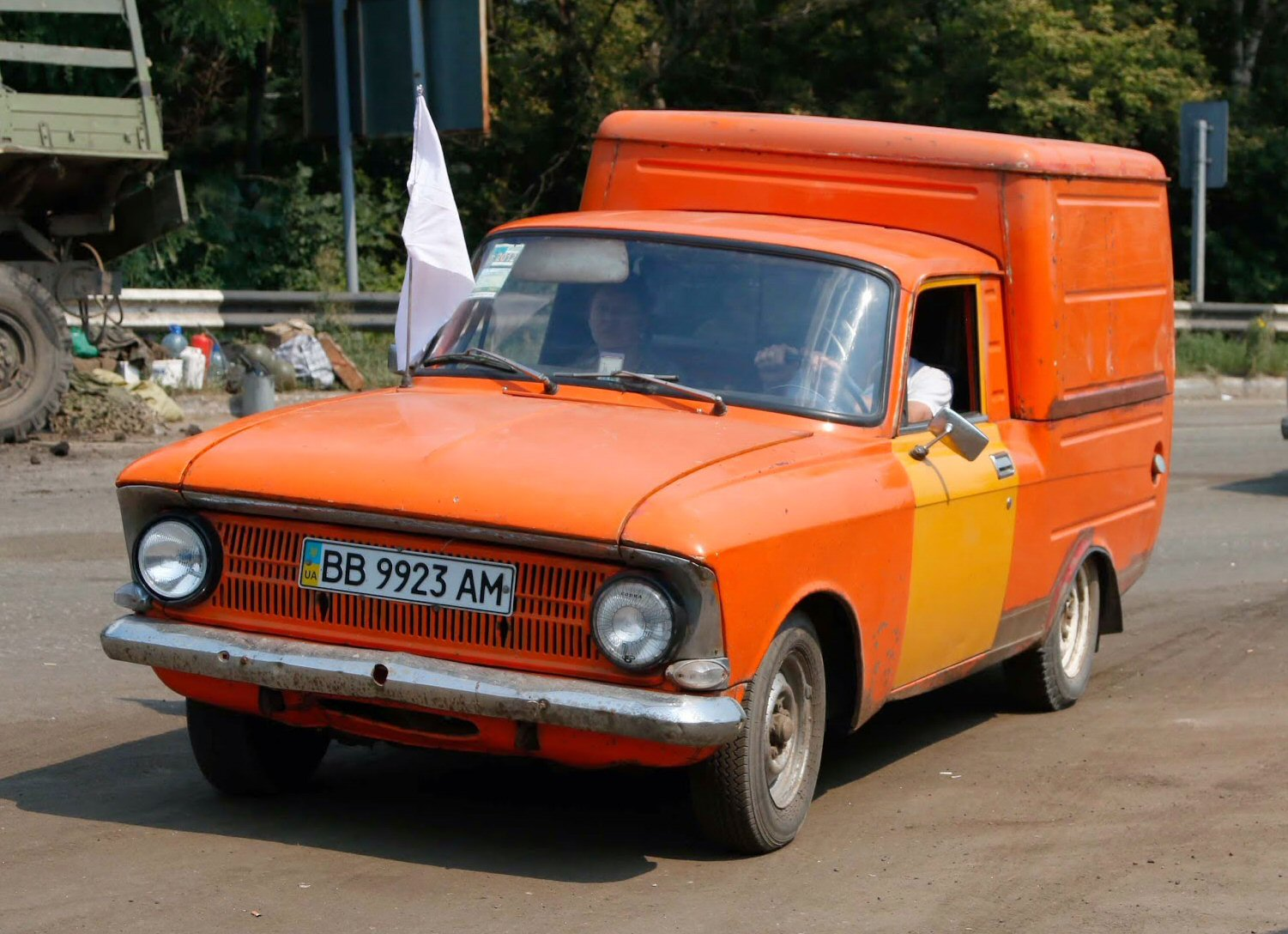
Early Izh 2715-production (with doors from a later model)

After refinement, the new van-bodied vehicle was put into production under the designation Izh-2715, in line with the new model numbering system. Unlike the prototypes, the cargo compartment was an integral part of the lower body. The upper housing was a separate part, attached at the end of assembly, a necessity due to the desire to produce the commercial vehicles on production lines designed for Moskvitch-412 sedans. Although the cargo compartment was not wider than the body, its sides rose almost vertically at the rear, allowing for significant widening compared to the driver’s cabin and the Moskvitch-434’s cargo area. The roof over the cargo compartment was raised, and the rear featured symmetrical double doors, with an opening height of 1,060 mm and a width of 1,040 mm. The cargo space volume was 2.6 m³, with a height of 1,170 mm (compared to 1.5 m³ and 875 mm in the Moskvitch). On the downside, the Izh had less body rigidity and cargo compartment sealing, making it less suitable for certain goods. There was a partition with a window between the cabin and the cargo area, and the spare wheel was stored behind the passenger seat. The vehicle had a payload capacity of between 350 and 400 kg. If necessary, the upper part of the cargo compartment housing could be removed along with the rear doors, converting it into a pickup body without a rear tailgate, although this was rarely done in practice. The upper part of the serial vans’ housing was reinforced with three horizontal recessed grooves, and the lower side panels had two reinforcement grooves (introduced after the trial series). The power source was the 1.5-liter UZAM-412 gasoline engine, producing 75 hp, manufactured by the Ufa Engine Industrial Association in Ufa, the same engine used in the Moskvitch-412 and all of its derivatives. The vehicle's floor and suspension were not significantly altered or reinforced compared to the passenger model.

From November 1972 to the end of the year, the first batch of 829 Izh-2715 vehicles was produced, with mass production beginning in 1973 (33,271 units), and by 1974, production had increased to 45,800 units. The Izh-2715 and Izh-27151 were originally badged as "ИЖ 1500 ГР" (ГР from "грузовой", cargo) on the rear doors and the tailgate respectively, but the badge was discontinued in circa 1977-1978, and from that point onward, the cars had "ИЖ 2715" or "ИЖ 27151" directly embossed into the metal on the same places.

=== Izh-27151 pickup truck ===
The Izh-27151 pickup truck version with a tailgate was also launched in 1974. The need for its development was primarily driven by export demands, as pickup trucks were less practical in the Soviet Union due to weaker protection of goods from weather conditions and theft. Production of the pickup truck was significantly lower than that of the van (e.g., 4,200 units in 1974, 5,000 in 1975). The nominal payload was set at 400 kg, but in practice, it could reach from 500 to 600 kg. A window was placed in the rear wall of the cabin, secured with a vertical grille. Some export vehicles (both vans and pickups) were better finished, with rectangular headlights (similar to those of the Moskvitch 412) and a chrome grille and bumper, while vehicles for the domestic market generally had round headlights and body-colored grilles and bumpers. For export, pickups were labeled as Moskvitch 1500 GR, and for Western markets, they were branded as Elite Pick Up. The pickup's platform measured 1,655 mm in length and 1,440 mm in width, with a distance of 940 mm between the wheel wells, and the floor height was 565 mm.

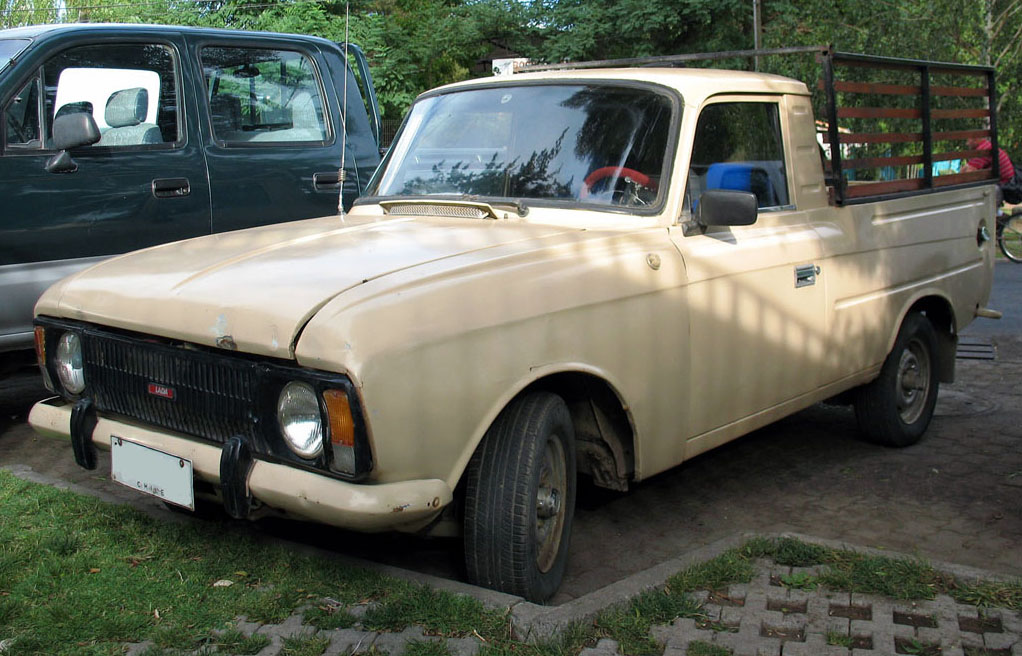
Izh-27151-01 pickup version in Chile (the vehicle was sold under the Lada brand in some markets)

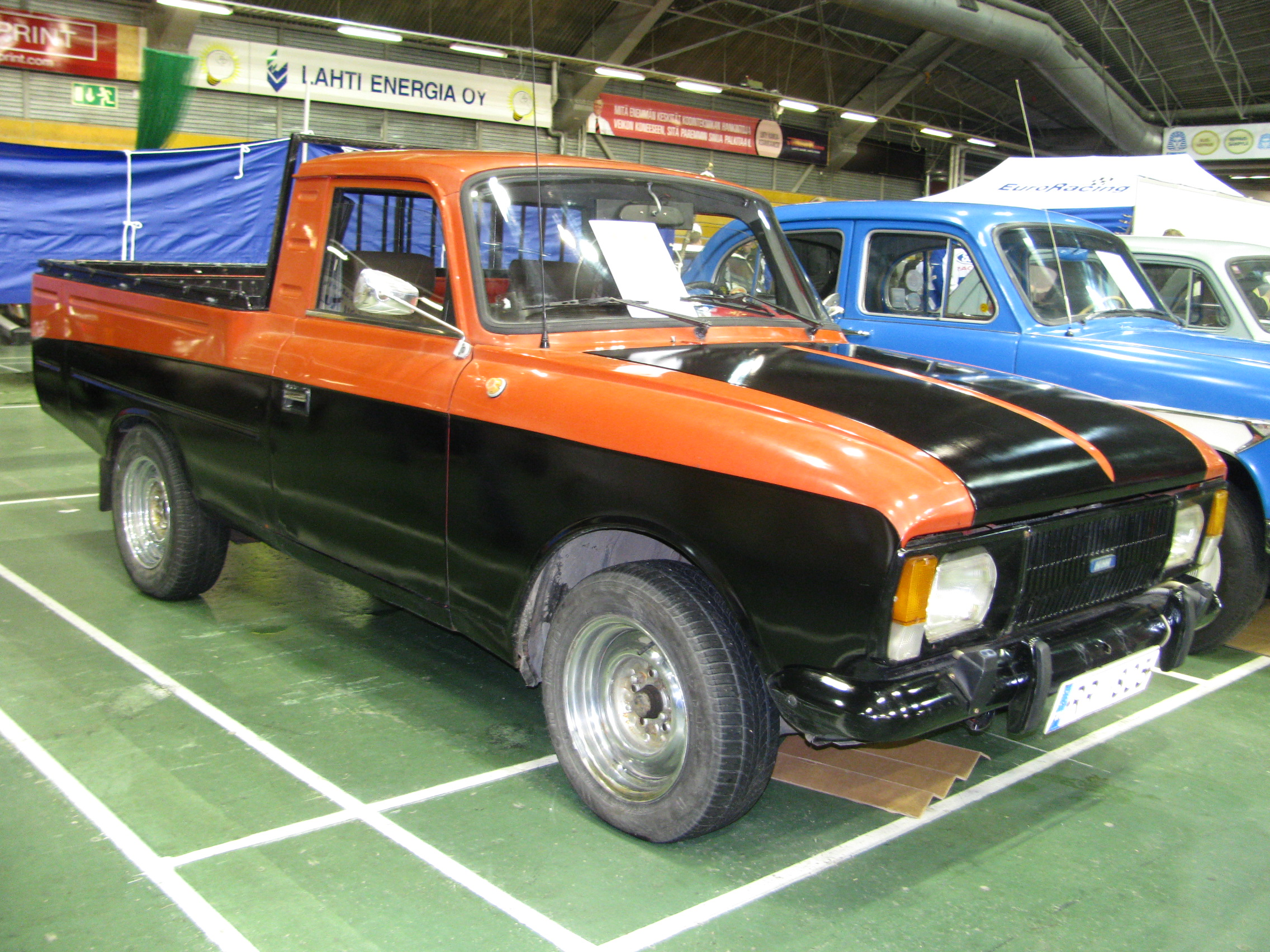
Extended pickup (Izh-27151-013-01) in Finland, with rectangular headlights

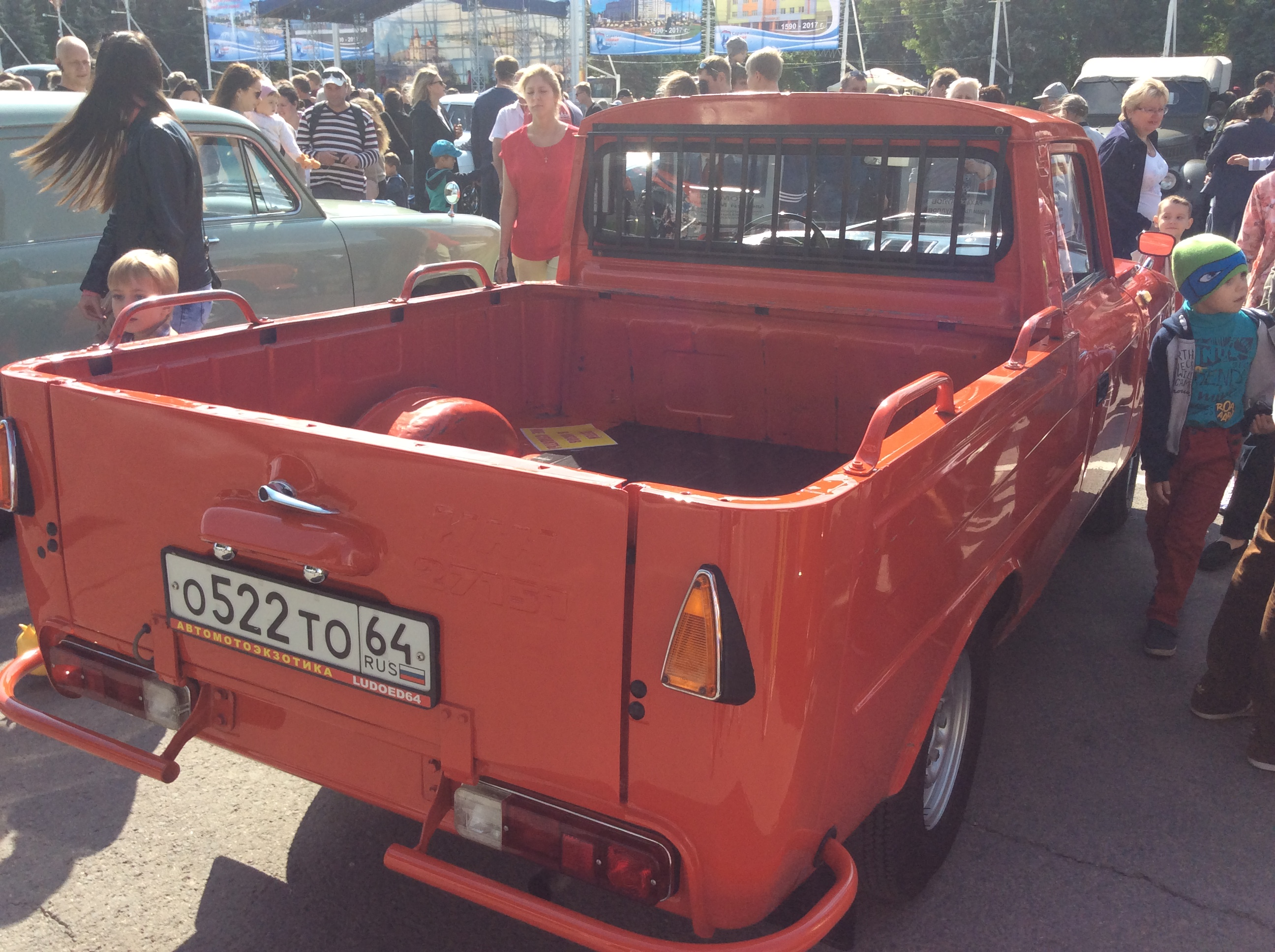
Cargo bed of the Izh 27151

=== Second generation – 1980s and 1990s ===
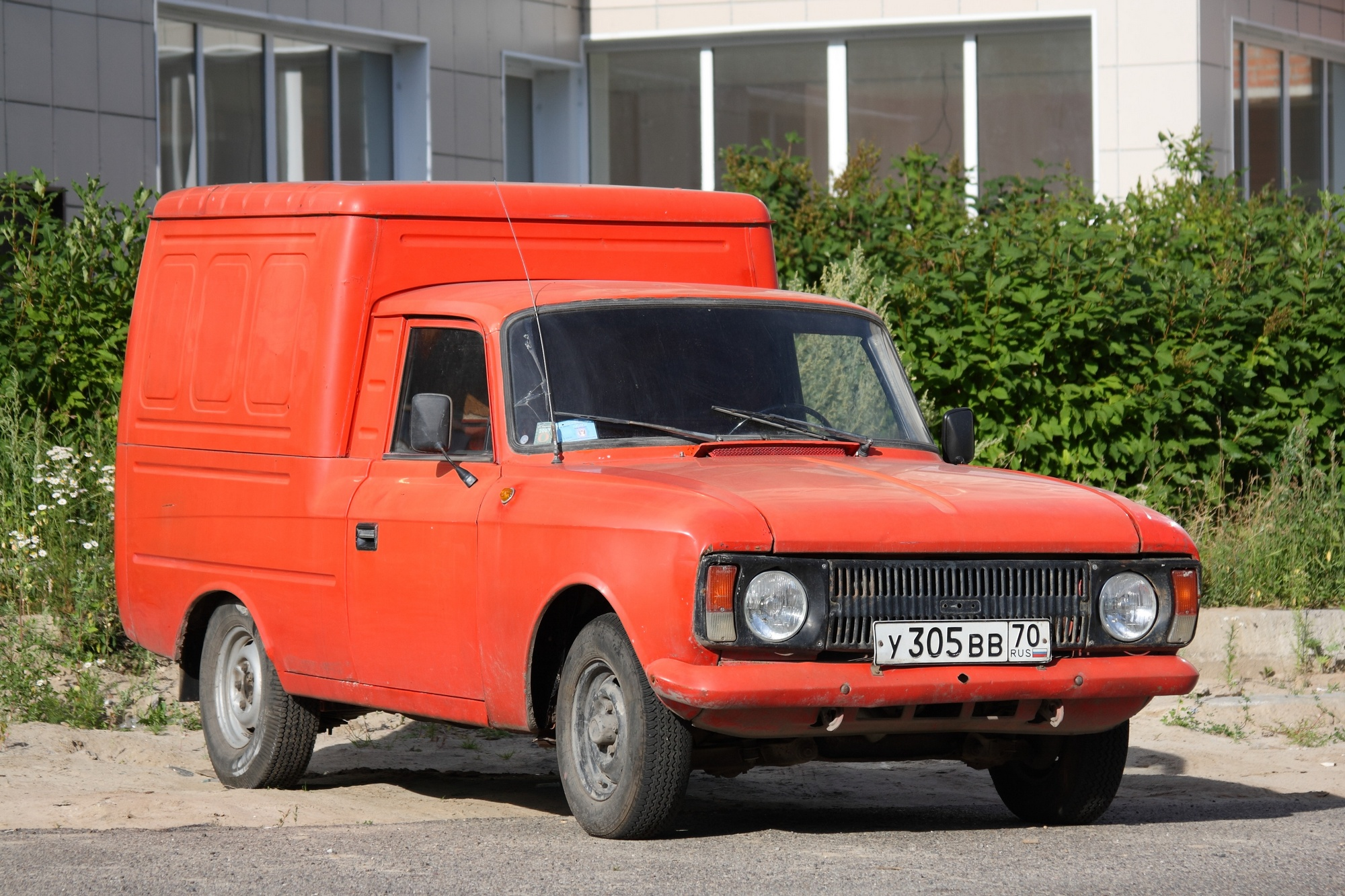
Izh-2715-01

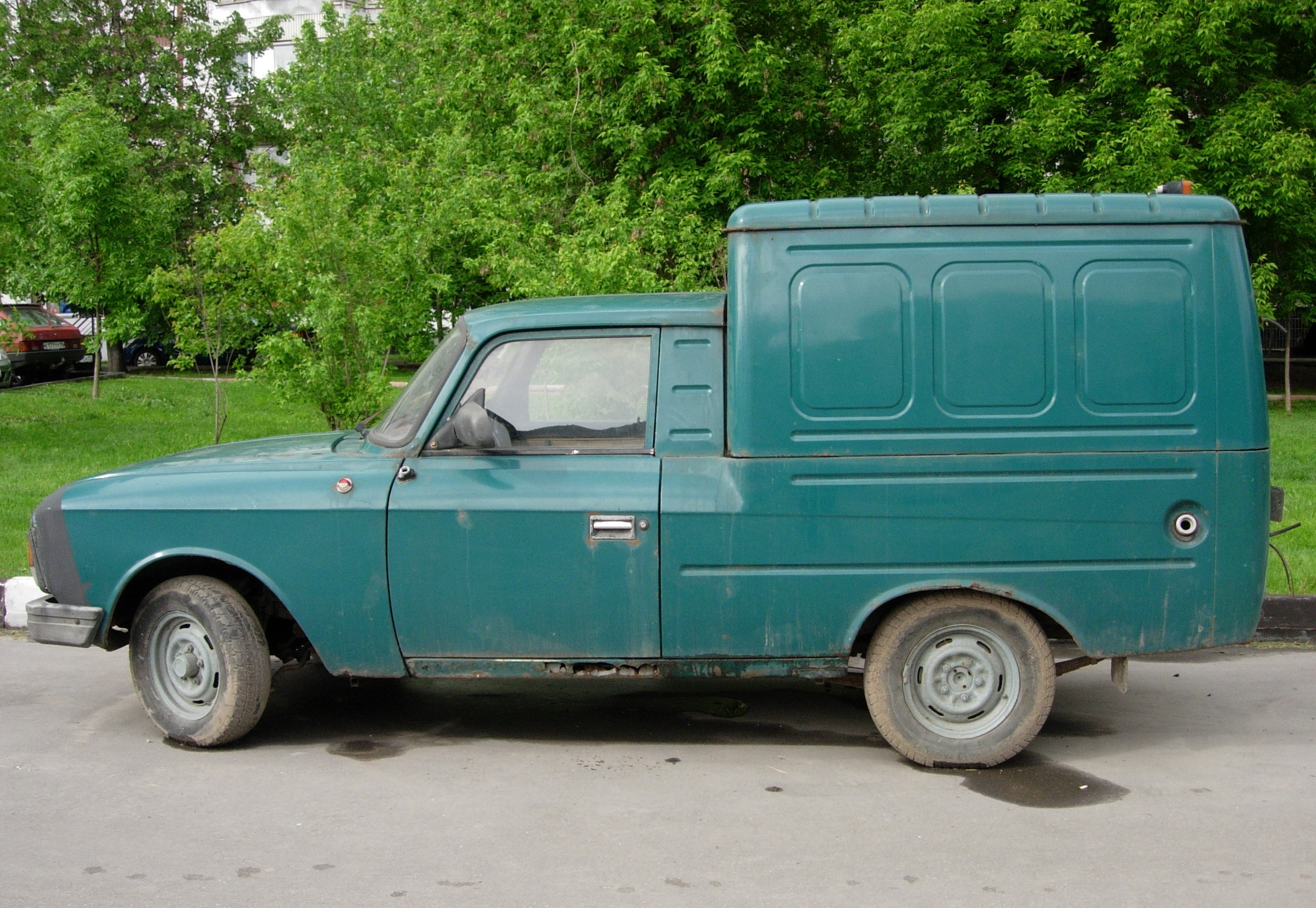
Izh-2715-01 with late 1990s plastic bumpers

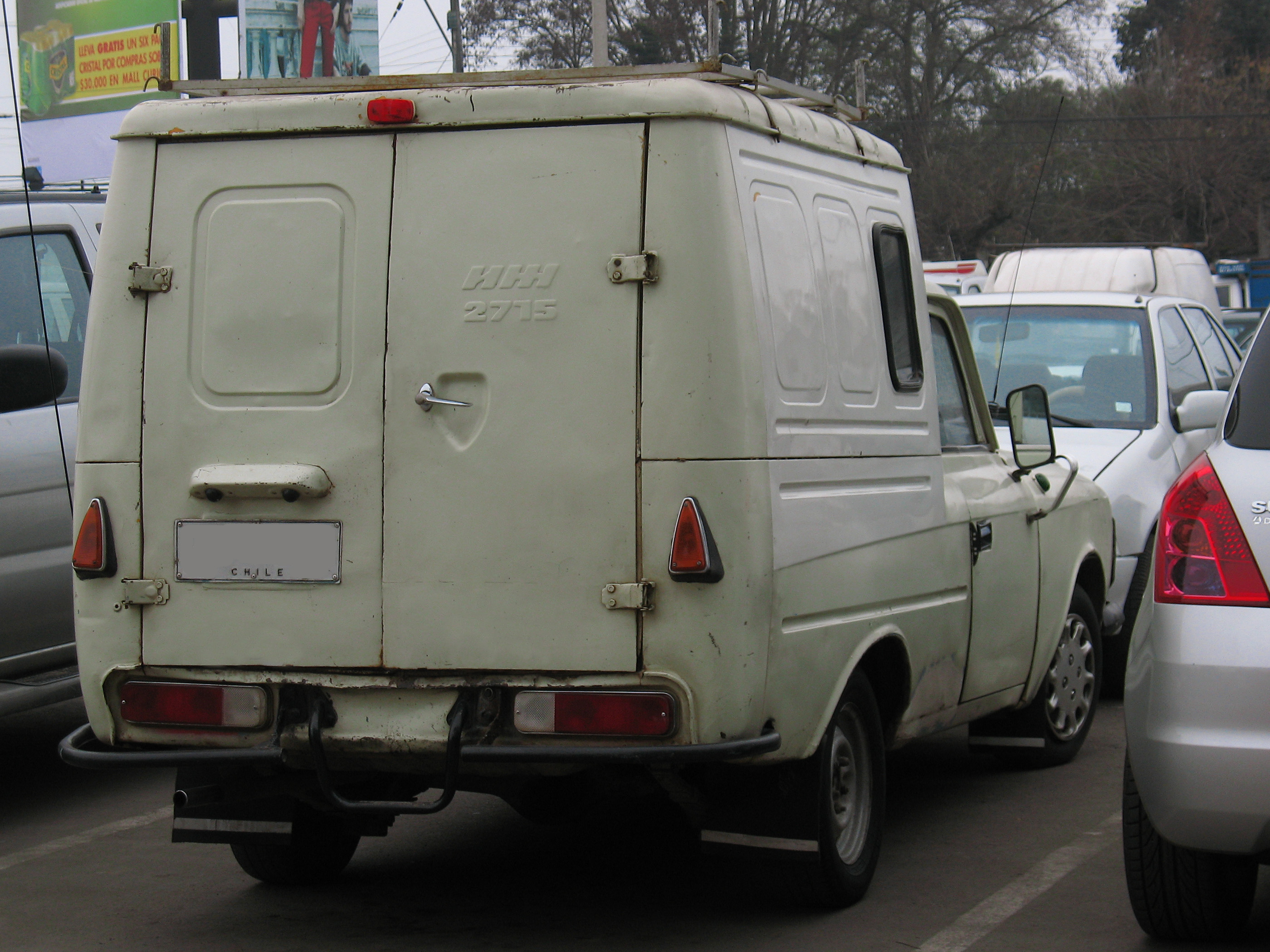
Izh-2715-01 from mid-late 1980s, before the taillight rearrangement, with an aftermarket window sourced from UAZ-452 on the side of the cargo compartment

In 1982, the vehicles underwent a limited modernization, following the updates made to the base Moskvitch-412 sedan produced in Izhevsk. The updated vehicles received factory designations Izh 2715-01 (van) and Izh 27151-01 (pickup). The front end appearance was modernized, with a black-painted sheet metal grille, and the turn signals and parking lights were placed vertically beside the grille instead of below the round headlights. Recessed door handles were introduced, using the same design as on the Moskvitch 2140, but positioned lower on the door panel. The electrical system and braking system were improved, with the latter becoming dual-circuit. Interior updates included more comfortable seats and the relocation of the light switch from the floor to the steering column. The payload capacity increased by 50 kg. The standard engine became the detuned UZAM-412DE version, with 67 hp, adapted for lower-quality A-76 gasoline, except for some specific domestic batches and the export versions, which retained the previous UZAM-412 engine for AI-93. Export versions of pickups and vans still sometimes rectangular headlights, which were extremely rarely used by the export versions of the facelifted 412 and Kombi. In the same year, a pickup with an extended cargo bed, designated Izh 27151-013-01, was introduced, mainly for Finland and Latin American markets, and produced in small series until 1997. Instead of receiving a completely new bed mold, the Izh-2715-013-01 simply had a 400mm overhang grafted onto the rear end of the existing bed, with the tailgate consequently relocated, which increased the bed length from 1650mm to 2050mm. When fully loaded, this version had worse handling due to the lightened front wheels caused by the unbalanced rear overhang. Exported extended pickups typically came with rectangular headlights. In the early 1990s, an extended van version was developed, intended among other things for use as an ambulance, but this version did not enter production.

The vehicles underwent further minor changes starting in the 1980s. Single-panel windows were introduced, eliminating the vent glasses, and the side mirrors were moved from the fenders to the doors. On the cargo compartment, the three horizontal reinforcement grooves were replaced with three vertical rectangular embossed sections ("faux windows"), and a similar "faux window" was added to the left half of the rear double doors. In the early 1990s, the rear bumpers, previously consisting of two sections of bent pipes on the corners of the body, were replaced by a single long straight pipe, which also served as a step. The taillight units were rearranged: the triangular turn signals on the rear pillars were eliminated, instead they were added to the main horizontal taillight units, replacing the reversing lights, which, conversely, were replaced with a single reversing light (the same unit as on the Izh 2125 Kombi) positioned centrally between the main units. From 1995, a plastic front bumper was introduced, but due to its susceptibility to damage, owners often replaced it with the old metal bumpers.

Despite the introduction of the more modern Izh-2717 van in the 1990s, which initially had quality issues and was one and a half times more expensive, the Izh 2715 remained in production until 2001 due to continued demand. Even in 2000, the company Agropromprogress developed a refrigerated body version, which was the cheapest such vehicle on the Russian market.

=== Izh 27156 ===
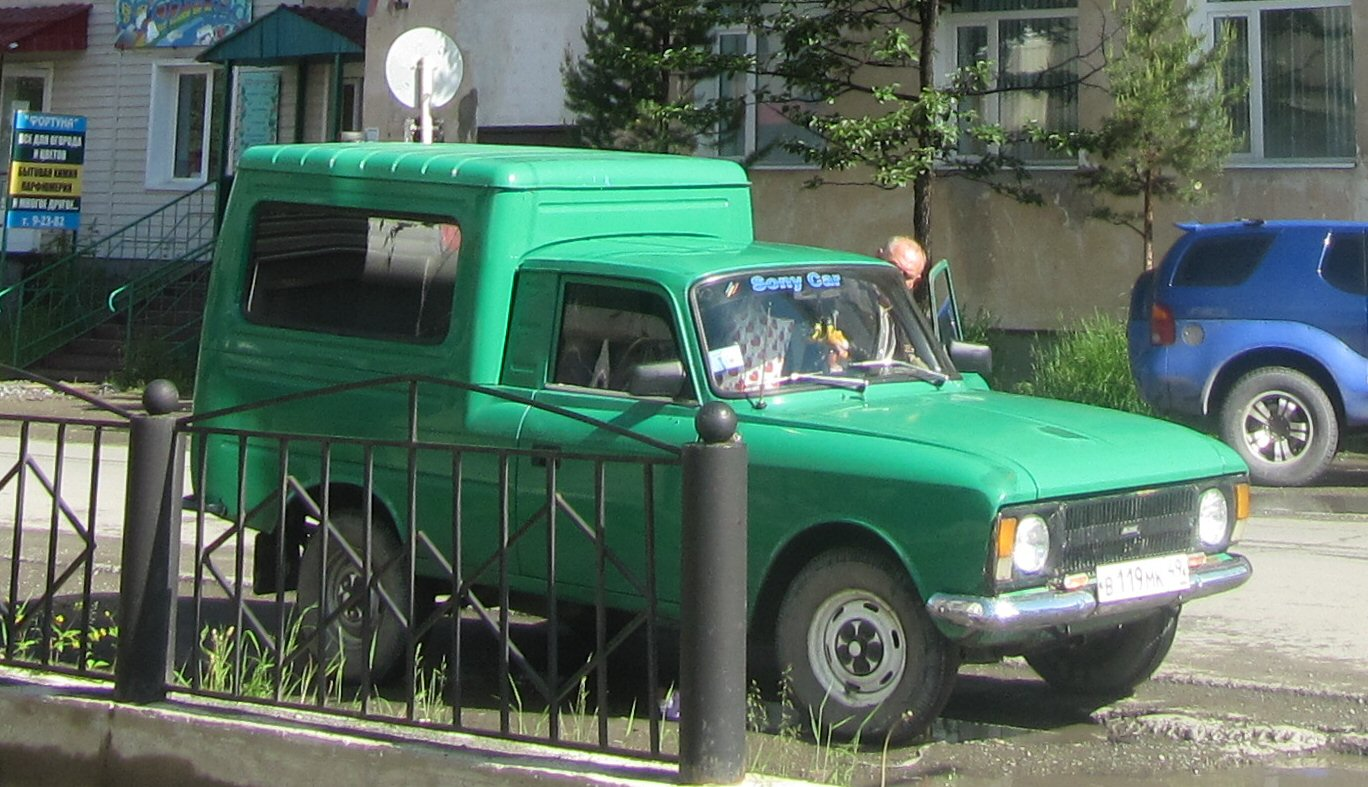
Cargo-passenger Izh 27156

Starting in the end of 1988, around the time when the minor late 1980s revisions were carried out, the cargo-passenger version Izh-27156 was also introduced. It differed by the addition of two folding two-person benches with backrests along the walls in the cargo compartment, which was equipped with large, partially sliding side windows, and an additional window was added in the left rear door. The window in the partition between the driver's cabin and the passenger-cargo compartment was also partially sliding.Unlike the Izh-2715 and Izh-27151, the Izh-27156, due to its status as a "cargo-passenger vehicle" (грузопассажирский автомобиль, a category typically reserved for station wagons), could be legally owned by regular Soviet citizens, though the production numbers were initially too low to cause significant demand. The inspiration for this variant was the French Matra Rancho. However, operational drawbacks included the lack of heating in the rear section and the infiltration of exhaust fumes and rain through leaky doors and windows. Despite these issues, this version proved to be a practical model during the economic transformation of the early 1990s, and its production increased from 536 units in 1990 to 4,260 in 1994. It was the first vehicle of this kind in the Soviet Union/Russia, and by the end of production in 2001, a total of 19,994 units had been manufactured. Some of the more basic vehicles of this model from the 1990s, due to difficulties in sourcing parts, lacked rear side glazing. Even earlier, however, some standard vans had been modified by users with the addition of various windows, often by mounting the UAZ-452 side windows in place of the embossed "faux windows", which exactly matched their dimensions.

== Sales and operation ==
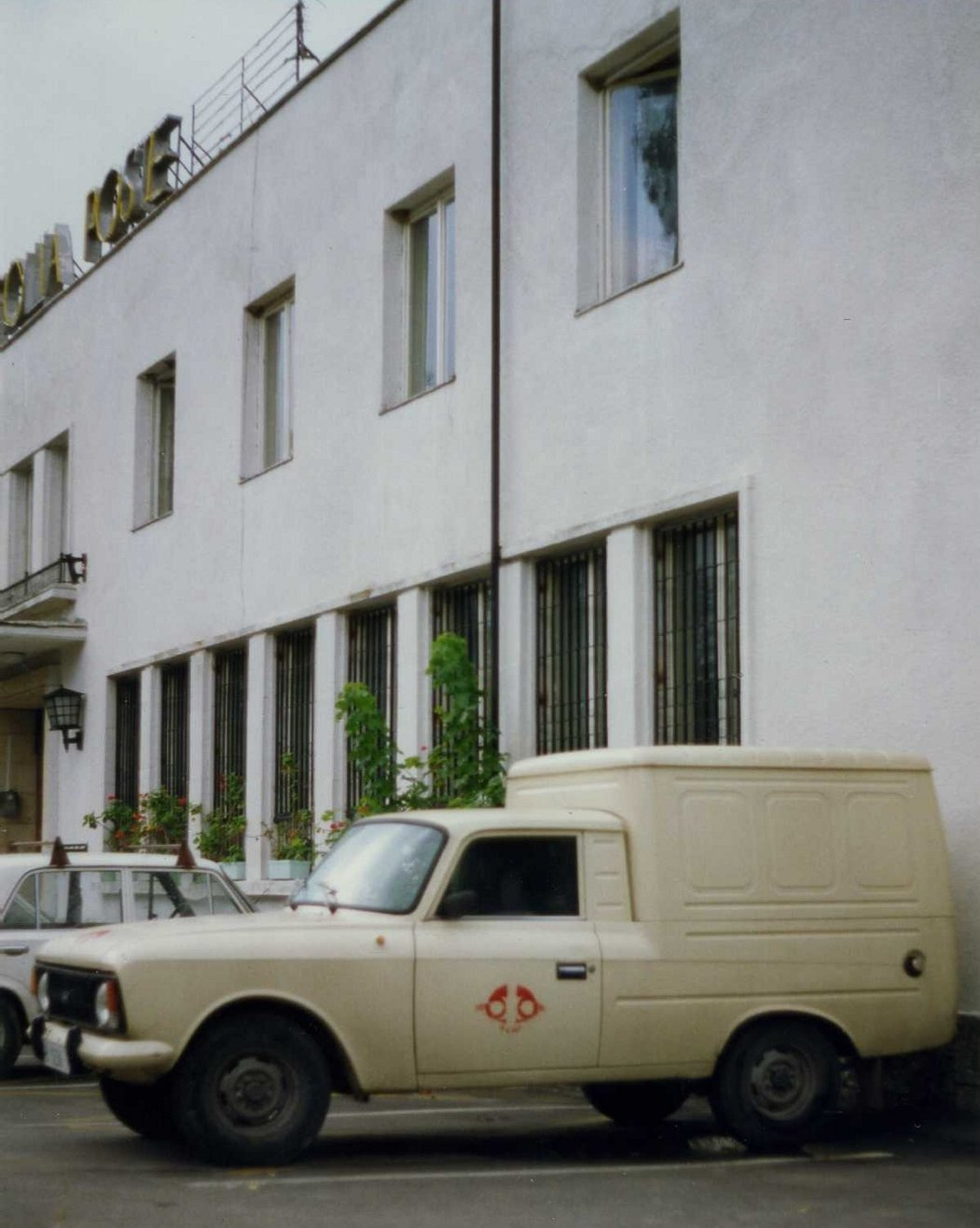
Izh 27151 in use by the Bulgarian postal service, 1993

Due to their practicality, the mass-produced Izh vans became widely used across the Soviet Union. Because of their body shape, evoking a shoe with a high bootleg, they were popularly called kabluk or kabluchok (каблук/каблучок – heel/little heel), mainly in Russia and other former Soviet states. They were also nicknamed pirozhok (пирожок – little pie), due to being often used to deliver baked goods; this nickname was mainly used in Ukraine and parts of Russia that border it, including Krasnodar and Voronezh. Originally, the "pirozhok" nickname was used for the Moskvitch-433/434/2734 station wagon-based panel vans, but as they gradually disappeared from the streets into an almost total extinction (mainly due to the Soviet policy of scrapping a commercial vehicle after accumulating 250,000 km), the Izh-2715, which retook their role, inherited the nickname. Both nicknames are often used for other cars with the same body style, including later models like the ZAZ-11055 Tavria Pickup, and the comparable Western models like the earlier generations of the Volkswagen Caddy.

A distinctive feature of the Soviet communist economy was that vans and pickups could not be sold to private users, as they were considered means of production. They were only used as service vehicles in various institutions, state-owned enterprises, and socialized commerce. From 1975 until the late 1980s, there was even a ban on registering such vehicles for private use. The vans also found widespread use in socialized services, managed by special ministries at the republic level. There were also specialized variants; for example, since 1982, RBTM workshop vehicles were produced in Ryazan for repair teams working on electronic and household equipment. These vehicles were also exported to some socialist countries that did not produce such vehicles, as well as to the West (including and Finland), Latin America, and Africa, where they were somewhat successful due to their low price and durable construction.

It wasn't until the second half of the 1980s, following partial free-market reforms associated with perestroika, that certain cargo-passenger vehicles were allowed for private use in the Soviet Union. The model designed for this purpose was the cargo-passenger Izh 27156, classified as a passenger car, though it was only produced in small quantities starting in 1988. Shortly thereafter, with the change in the political system, all restrictions on the ownership of commercial vehicles were lifted. During the economic transformation of the early 1990s, the affordable Izh vans gained significant popularity, serving as tools for running businesses and small-scale trade (including cross-border trade). Despite the general decline in production, these models helped the IzhAvto plant survive through the 1990s.

== Technical data ==
Izh 2715:

- Body: unibody, steel, 2-door, 2-seater
- Dimensions (length/width/height): 4,130/1,590/1,825 mm (1,470 mm for pickup)
- Wheelbase: 2,400 mm
- Track (front/rear): 1,270/1,270 mm
- Cargo compartment dimensions (length/width/height): 1,600/1,440/1,160 mm
- Curb weight: 1,015 kg (Izh 27156: 1,095 kg)
- Gross vehicle weight: 1,615 kg
- Ground clearance under axles: 160 mm
- Engine: UZAM-412DE – carbureted, 4-stroke, 4-cylinder inline, OHC, liquid-cooled, longitudinally mounted in the front, rear-wheel drive
- Displacement: 1,478 cm³
- Bore/Stroke: 82/70 mm
- Maximum power: 67 hp (or 75 hp) at 5,800 rpm
- Maximum torque: 100 Nm at 3,500 rpm
- Compression ratio: 7.2:1
- Carburetor: K-126N or DAAZ-2140
- Transmission: 4-speed manual, synchronized forward gears
- Final drive: hypoid gear, ratio 4.22:1
- Front suspension: independent, transverse arms with coil springs, hydraulic telescopic shock absorbers
- Rear suspension: dependent, rigid axle on longitudinal semi-elliptic leaf springs, hydraulic telescopic shock absorbers
- Brakes: front disc, rear drum, hydraulic, vacuum-assisted, dual-circuit; mechanical handbrake on rear wheels
- Tires: 165–330 (6.45–13)
- Top speed: 125 km/h
- Fuel consumption: 6.9 l/100 km at 80 km/h
- 0-100 km/h acceleration: 19 seconds

== See also ==
- Izh 2125

== Bibliography ==
- Andriyev, Konstantin (2013). "Izh-27151". Awtoliegendy SSSR (in Russian) (103). Moscow: DeAgostini. ISSN 2071-095X.
- "Izh-2715". Awtoliegendy SSSR I Socstran (in Russian) (187). Moscow: DeAgostini. 2016. ISSN 2071-095X.
- "Izh-27156". Awtoliegendy SSSR (in Russian) (76). Moscow: DeAgostini. 2011. ISSN 2071-095X.
- "Izh-412-028". Awtoliegendy SSSR (in Russian) (85). Moscow: DeAgostini. 2012. ISSN 2071-095X.
