= Moskvitch 412 =

Soviet/Russian small family car

Moskvitch-412/Izh-412
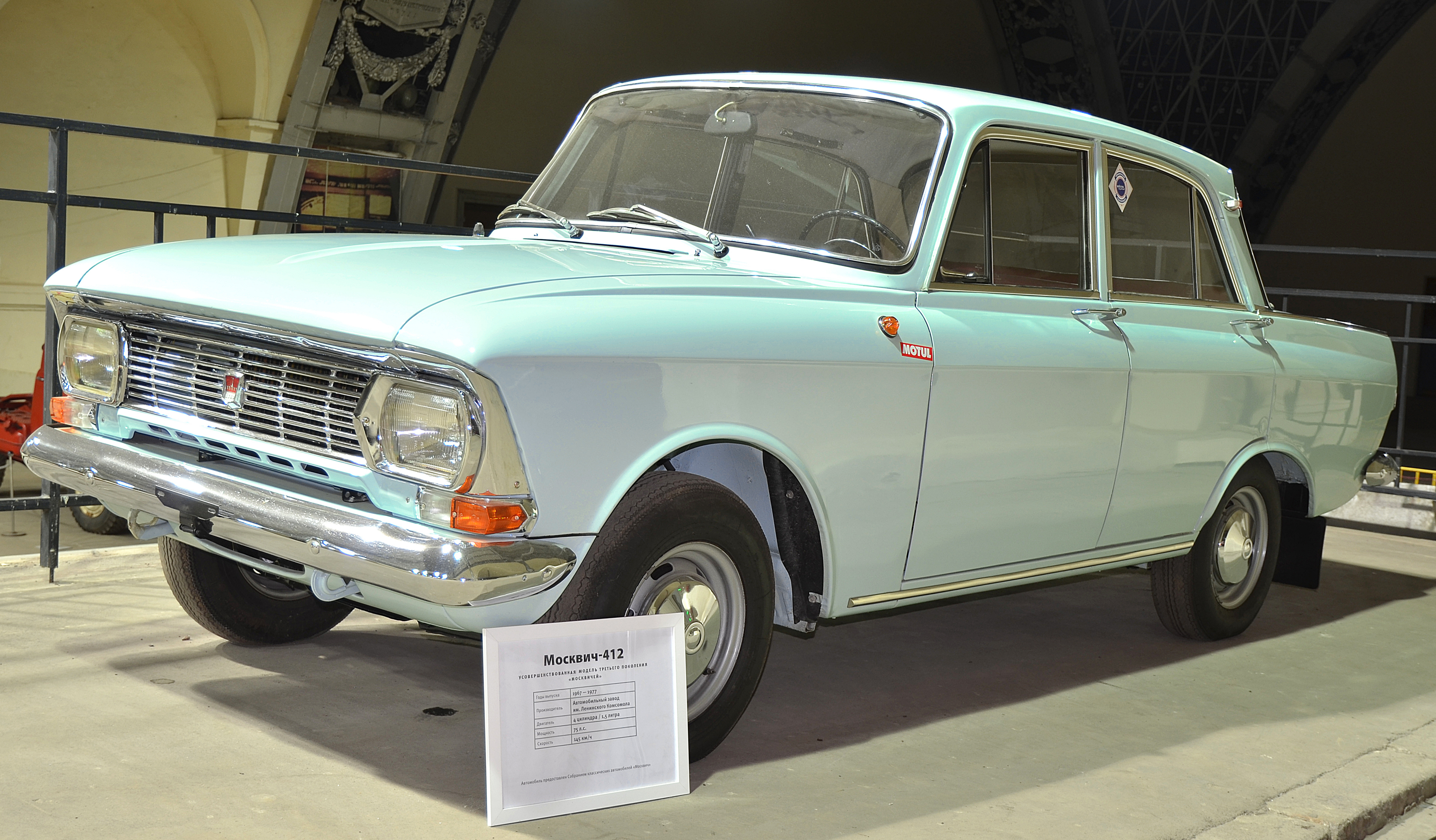

Overview
- Manufacturer: MZMA/AZLK; IZh
- Also called: Moskvich 1500 (UK, 1974); Moskvitsh Elite 1500 M (Finland)
- Production: 1967–1975 as "Moskvitch-412/427/434"; 1967–1997 as "IZh-412" (derived models produced in Izhevsk until 1997); 1972–2001 as "IZh-2715"
- Assembly: Soviet Union: Moscow (Moskvitch); Soviet Union/Russia: Izhevsk (IZh)

Body and chassis
- Class: Small family car
- Body style: 4-door sedan; 3- and 5-door station wagon; 3-door van; 2-door pick-up
- Layout: FR layout
- Related: Moskvitch 408

Powertrain
- Engine: 1478 cc UZAM-412 I4
- Transmission: 4-speed manual

Dimensions
- Wheelbase: 2,400 mm (94.5 in)
- Length: 4,115 mm (162.0 in)
- Width: 1,550 mm (61.0 in)
- Curb weight: 1,045 kg (2,304 lb)

Chronology
- Predecessor: Moskvitch 408
- Successor: Moskvitch 2140 (for Moskvitch); Izh 2125 Kombi (for Izh)

The Moskvitch 412 (Moskvich 412, Москвич-412, M-412) is a small family car produced by Soviet/Russian manufacturer MZMA/AZLK in Moscow from 1967 to 1975, and by IZh in Izhevsk from 1967 to 1997 (also known as Izh Moskvich-412 officially and "Izh-412" commonly). It was a more powerful and prestigious version of the M-408 model, offering more features for a higher price.

== Design ==
The Moskvitch 412 derived from the Moskvitch 408, differing in more powerful 1.5 engine. The earliest engines for the 412 were built in 1964. The Moskvitch 412 had a slanted (to a tilt of 20 degrees) inline-four engine with a block, head, and inlet manifold cast in aluminium alloy to keep the engine weight down, and a hemispherical combustion chamber. Steel cylinder liners were replaceable to enable easy repair of the engine instead of having to replace it entirely. Since it was of an OHC design, it was taller than the OHV MZMA-408 engine it replaced, which is why it was mounted at a slant. The UZAM-412 had a capacity of 1,478 cc (90.2 cu in) c.c. and developed 75 horsepower. Its more powerful version, the Moskvitch-412-2V, had 100 h.p. and was installed on sports cars. The 1,478 cc (90.2 cu in) UZAM-412 engine, with a light alloy block, was designed by Igor I. Okunev. According to some observers, it bore some similarities to the contemporary BMW M 115 motor used in the BMW 1500 model, although in other ways they are different from each other. The similarity between the two engines is purely superficial and limited only to the tilt angle of the cylinder block and between the valves and the gear of the overhead camshaft. The gearbox inherited from the M-408 was improved, with the gearbox ratios being revised to make better use of the increased power output. Until early 1969, the M-412 had the gear lever on the steering column, just like M-408, and did not have bucket seats, but a front bench, making the M-408 and M-412 very hard to distinguish. From early 1969 on, because a new improved gearbox was installed in order to make a better use of the power and torque and to improve performances, M-412 had the gear lever mounted on the floor. The M-408 had the gear lever mounted on the floor since late 1973. Initially, the M-412 was designed as a replacement for the M-408, but they ended up being built together at the same plant. The decision to keep the M-408 in production was that it was more suited to harsh conditions than the M-412; it could tolerate 76-octane fuel and could work with lower grade oils. Between 1967 and 1969, the only difference between 408 and 412 was usually the badge on the trunk lid, which said "Москвич 408" or "Москвич 412" respectively. Some export markets had additional badges on the front fenders or the grille, or changed the badge, switching the text to Latin "Moskvich" and/or replacing the model numbers with "1360"/"1500".

In the end of 1969 (November-December), both the M-412 and the related M-408 had their bodies redesigned. These were notable for being the first Moskvitch models to feature rectangular headlights instead of the older round units (two on domestic models, four on some export variants) and horizontal rear lights with triangular turn signal "arrows" above them on the vestigial tailfins, instead of vertical rear lights on full-fledged tailfins. The rectangular headlights, which were East German units manufactured by VER and shared with the Wartburg 353, were inherited by the 2138/2140 line in 1976. The first series Moskvich 412-(1967–1969) is quite rare today, as they were more expensive and thus built in lower numbers than the 408. Another notable feature, shared with the GAZ-24 Volga, were the so-called "parking signals", dual-purpose side markers (only one bulb, but with front half of the lens white and rear half red) mounted on the C-pillars on some vehicles and similar to the American "opera lights", these were discontinued early into the production of the Moskvich-2140. The designers "had paid real attention to passive safety," the car was crash-tested, met the standards of safety adopted by the UNECE, and received an international safety certificate as a result of almost five months of tests in France. It was upgraded with dual-circuit braking system with power assistance (servo), disc brakes on the front wheels since 1970 (models with front drum brakes continued to be built, but for certain markets, like western Europe, were delivered with brake discs, but even in East Europe models with brake discs at the front were available, in parallel with drum brakes versions), reinforced car-body structure, and passive safety features such as soft grip steering wheel cover, soft interior parts, seat belts, and padded dashboard. It was the first Moskvitch to pass safety-features tests in France, Bulgaria, Czechoslovakia, and Sweden in 1970–71, and in West Germany in 1972. The modernized model, both for export and domestic market, received a factory code M-412IE, confirming that it fulfils new safety requirements.

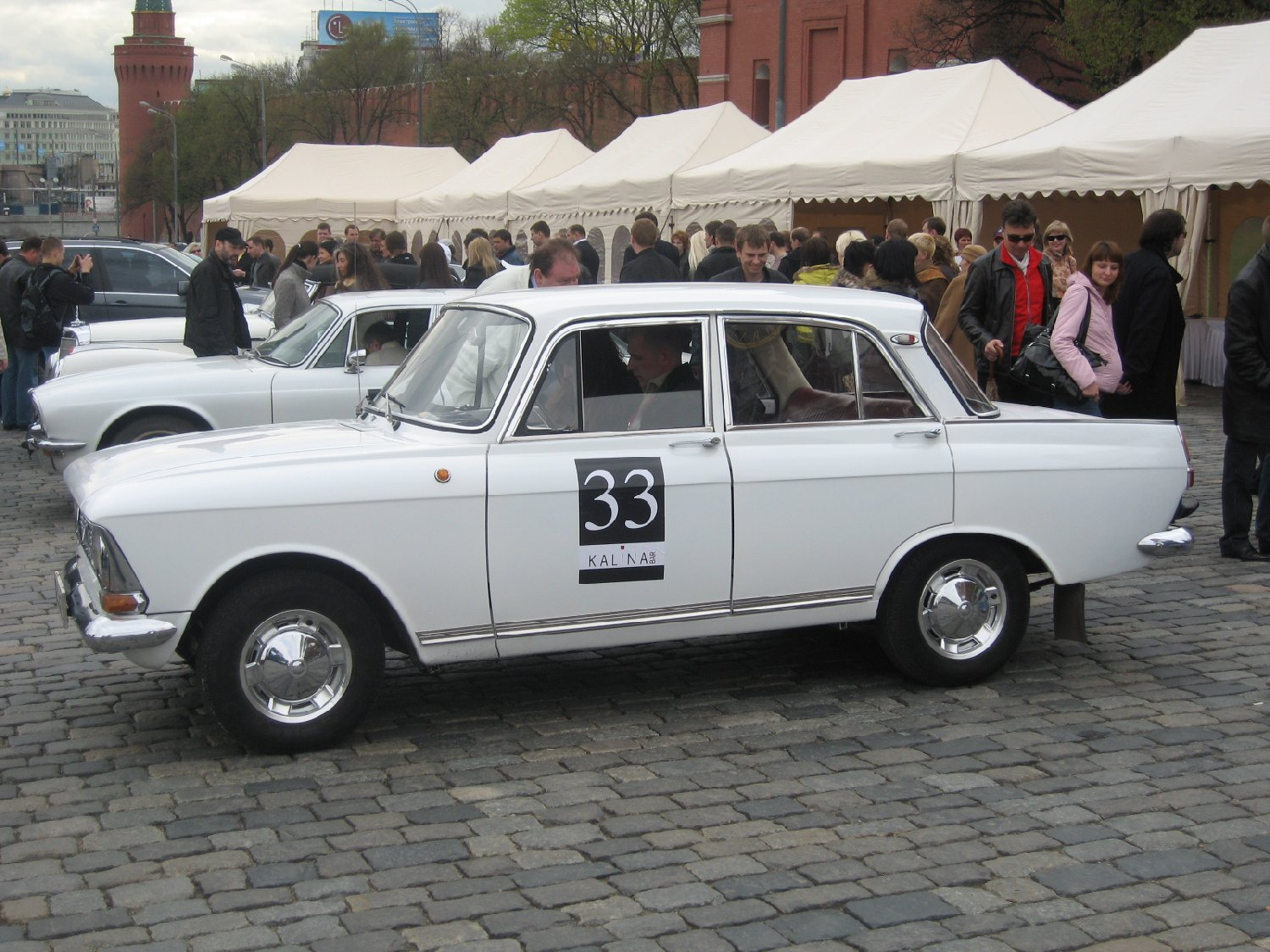
1975 Moskvitch 412IE (Elite)

SATRA Motors entered M-412s in the Group One Production Saloon Car Championship in 1972 and 1973, where it easily beat "sharp-handling but underpowered" Hillman Imps and Austin Minis. It also placed 1-2-3 in the 1973 Avon Round Britain Rally and scored a class win in the South Africa Safari Rally the same year.

== Trims and models ==
=== Moskvitch (AZLK) ===
- M-412 (1967-1976), four-door sedan and the counterpart of the Moskvitch-408.
- М-427 (1969-1976), five-door station wagon and the counterpart of the Moskvitch-426. Originally it had a two-piece tailgate, which was replaced with a conventional single-piece tailgate the second half of 1972 onward, the same applied to the M-434. Both of them maintained the tailfins and vertical taillights after the IE facelift, passing them on to their 2140-series counterparts (M-2137 and M-2734) in 1976.
- M-434 (1968-1976), three-door panel van, derived from the M-427, and the counterpart of the Moskvitch-433. It was distributed only to state organisations and fleets, being banned altogether from private ownership.

The three body styles had additional trims designated by letter suffixes after their model number:

- M-412E/426E/434E: for 1964-1969 export variants, with different adaptations for different markets, most notably four round headlamps instead of two;
- M-412IE/426IE/434IE: for all 1970-1976 cars, both domestic and export, as the standards became unified;
- M-412YU/426YU/434YU: for export variants (both series) adapted for countries with hotter climate (Ю — "южный", southern);
- M-412P/426P/434P: for export variants (both series) with right-hand drive, mainly, and possibly exclusively, for the British market;
- M-412PYU/426PYU/434PYU: right-hand-drive variants for hotter climate; might not have entered production, as the UK appears to be the sole right-hand-drive market served by AZLK;
- M-412M: for the medical dispatch variant of the Moskvitch-412 (both series). Beyond the standard medical livery, it had no differences from the retail sedan, as it was solely used as a transport for house calls.

The 412-series AZLK Moskvitch family did not have a standard pickup variant. Through circa 1974-1976, Satra Motors (the British importer of Moskvitch) converted some 434 vans into open-bed pickups by removing the upper side panels and the roof past the B-pillar. Additionally, a small number of light pickups was built by modifying defective bodies of 412-family cars with regular body styles, the bed structure and dimensions varied between different specimen. These pickups were used mainly as internal factory transports, were never distributed to citizens or state services, and never had an official index; the 2140 family continued this practice of pickup conversions through the 1970s and 1980s.

=== Izh ===
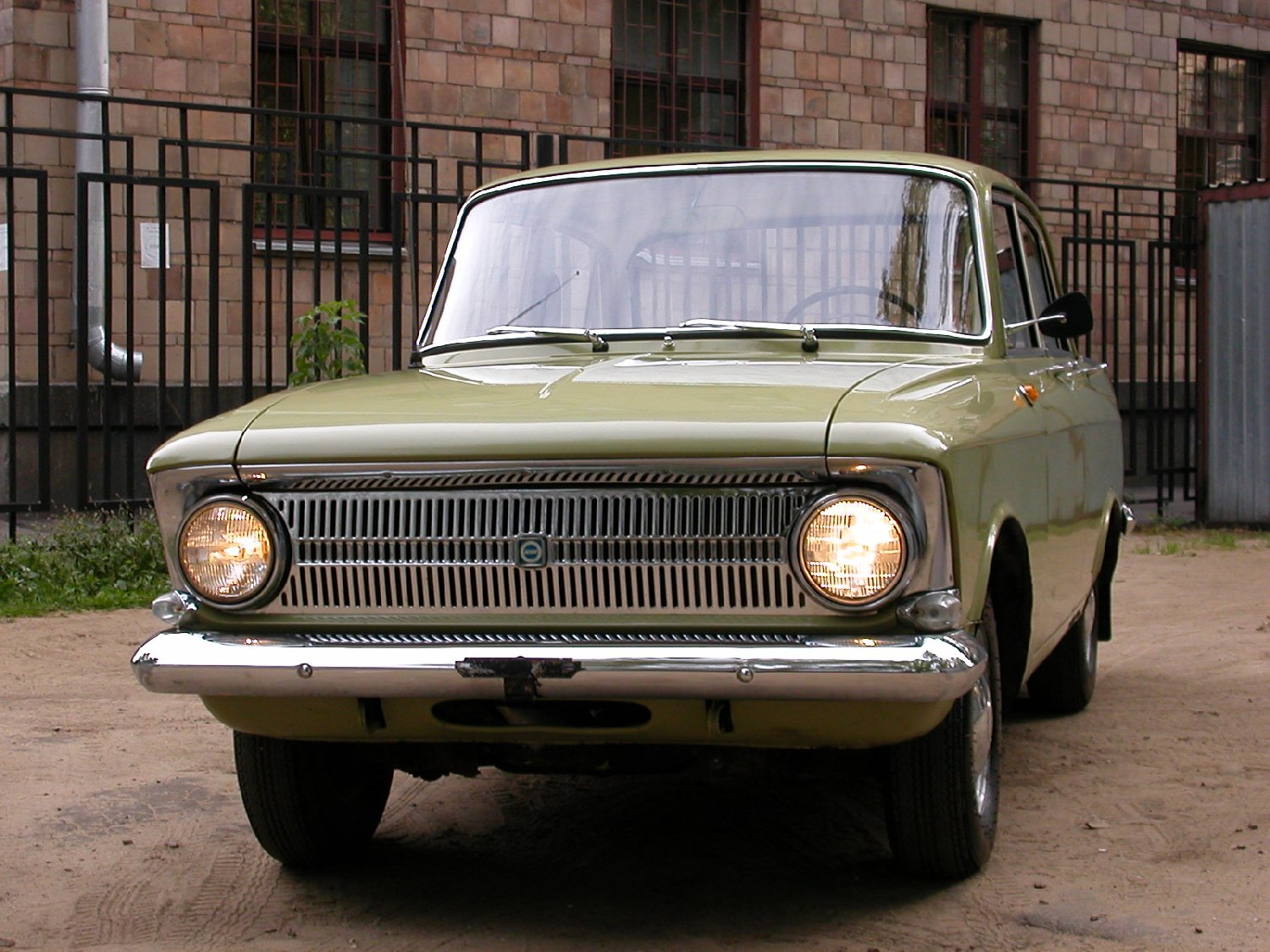
Izh Moskvitch-412 (1970s, first facelift)

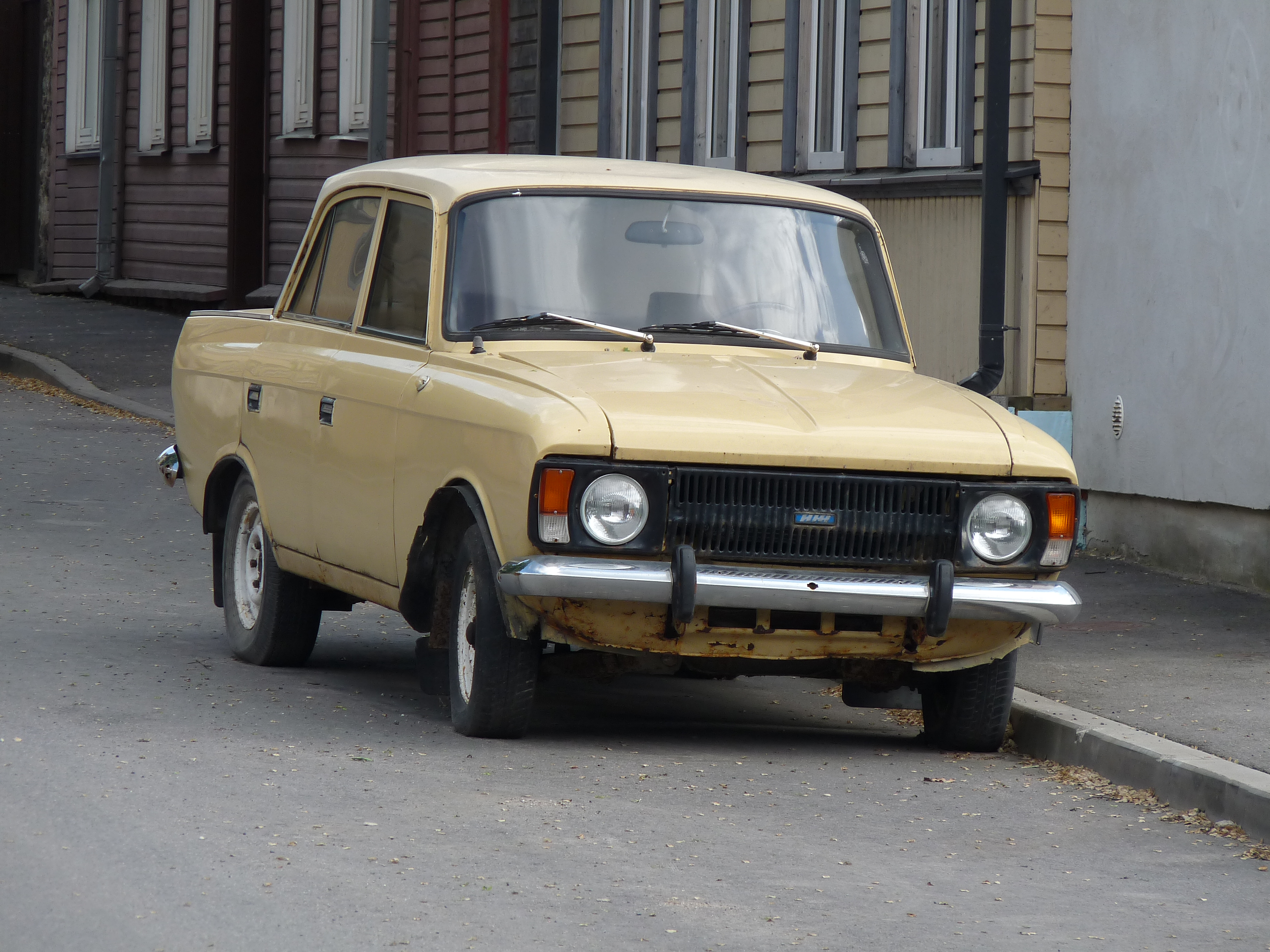
Izh Moskvitch-412IE-028 after 1982 facelift

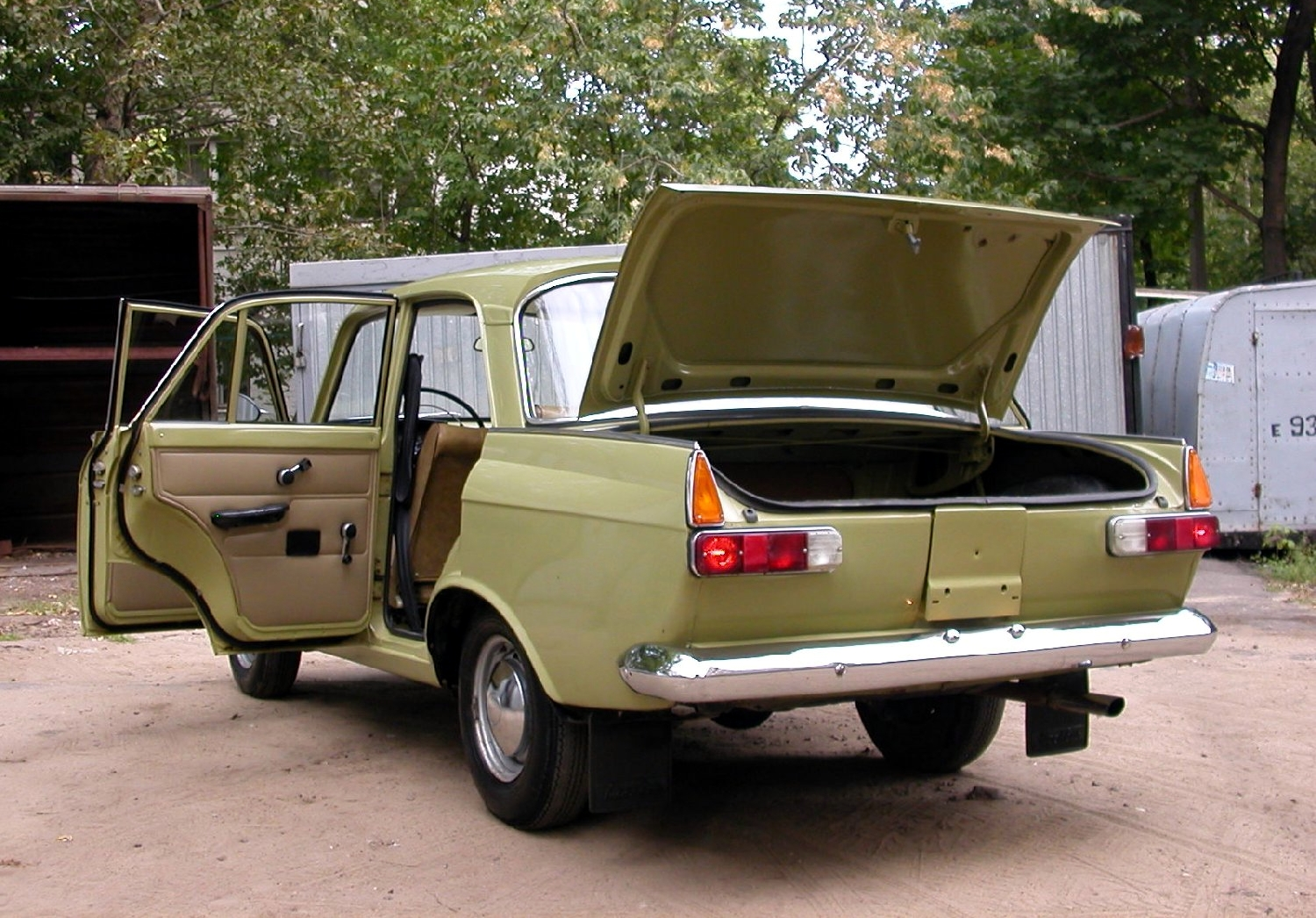
Izh/Moskvitch-412 rear view

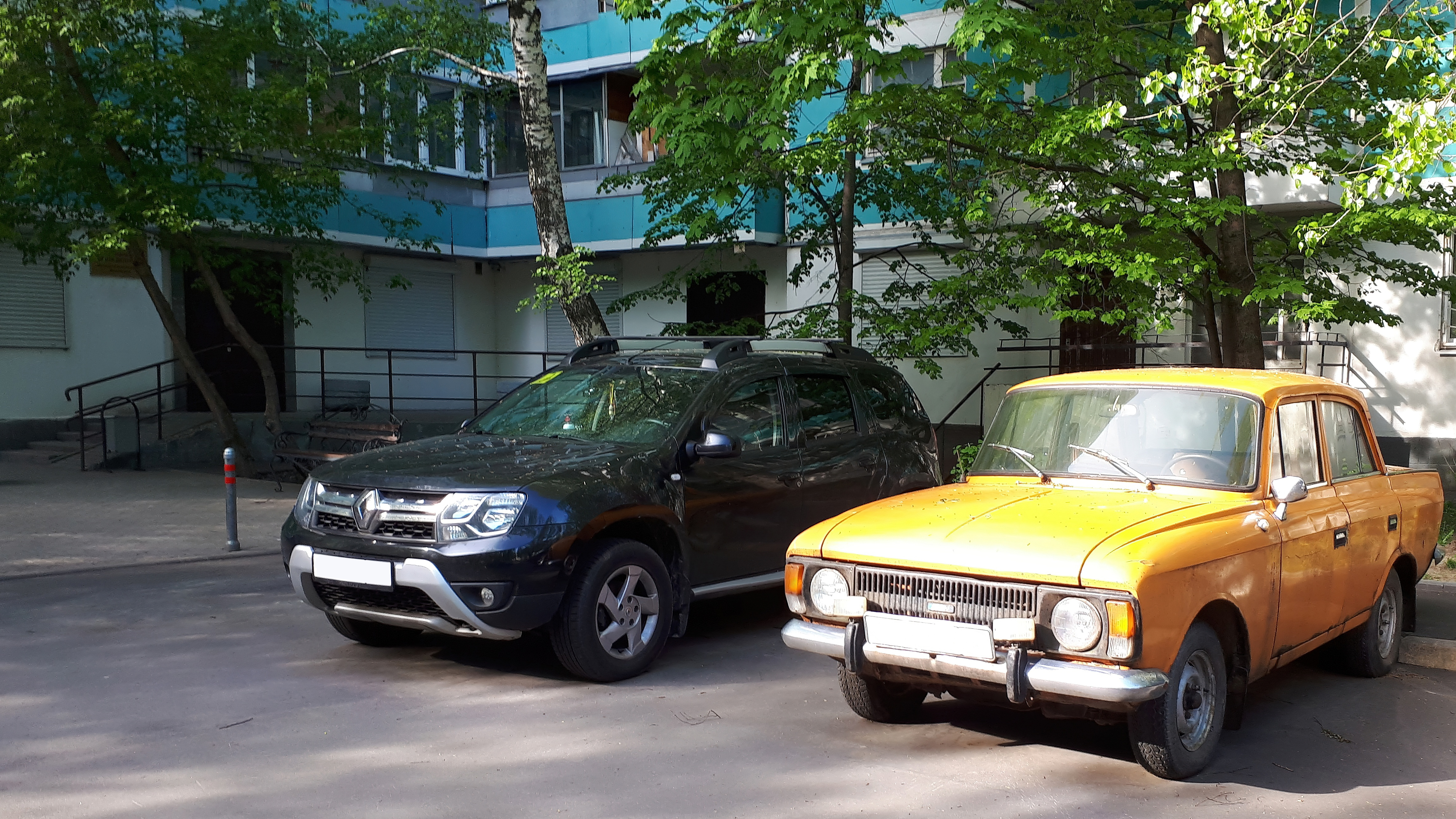
Izh Moskvitch-412IE-028 and a Renault Duster

- Izh Moskvitch-412 (1967-1997): the Izhevsk-manufactured counterpart of the Moskvitch-412. Originally it started as an outright rebadging of AZLK's model, but in 1969-1970 during the IE facelift, it received an updated front end design which still retained the round headlights, the new rear end design and other changes were applied as on AZLK's M-412. After a facelift in February 1982, it received a black-painted grille with turn signal/side marker units positioned vertically on the outer sides of the headlights, and recessed door handles identical to those used on the Moskvich-2140, but positioned lower on the door panel. This configuration (factory index "Moskvich-412IE-028", though the "028" was rarely used in marketing and press) remained in production until 1997 with minimal changes. Throughout its run, the car was always officially known, registered and marketed as "Moskvitch-412", despite having the Izh logo on the grille, "Izh-412" is unofficial folk nomenclature; the GAZ-69 had a similar case, where it remained a GAZ through its production run, despite being built in Ulyanovsk and having "УАЗ" embossed on its hood.
- Izh Moskvitch-427: the planned Izhevsk-manufactured counterpart of the Moskvitch-427. Few were assembled from AZLK-supplied CKD kits in 1970, it was canceled in favor of the Izh-2125 Kombi.
- Izh Moskvitch-434 (1968-1973): the Izhevsk-manufactured counterpart of the Moskvitch-434, originally also a rebadging, but received the Izh M-412IE front end with round headlights in 1969-1970. Discontinued in favor of the Izh-2715.
- Izh-2125 Kombi (1973-1997): the original Izhevsk-designed liftback, developed on the M-412 platform. It underwent a similar facelift to the Izh M-412 in 1982, redesignated Izh-21251, and remained in production until 1997.
- Izh-2715 (1972-2001): the successor of the Izh M-434, an original Izhevsk-designed panel van, which ditched the station wagon-based body in favor of a high-roof cargo counterpart behind the B-pillar. It underwent a similar facelift in 1982, redesignated Izh-2715-01, and remained in production until 2001.
- Izh-27151 (1974-2001): the pickup variant of the Izh-2715, which had the upper half of its cargo compartment removed, forming a pickup bed, and a tailgate replaced the rear double doors. It underwent a similar facelift in 1982, redesignated Izh-27151-01, and remained in production until 2001.

== Relationship to the M-408 ==
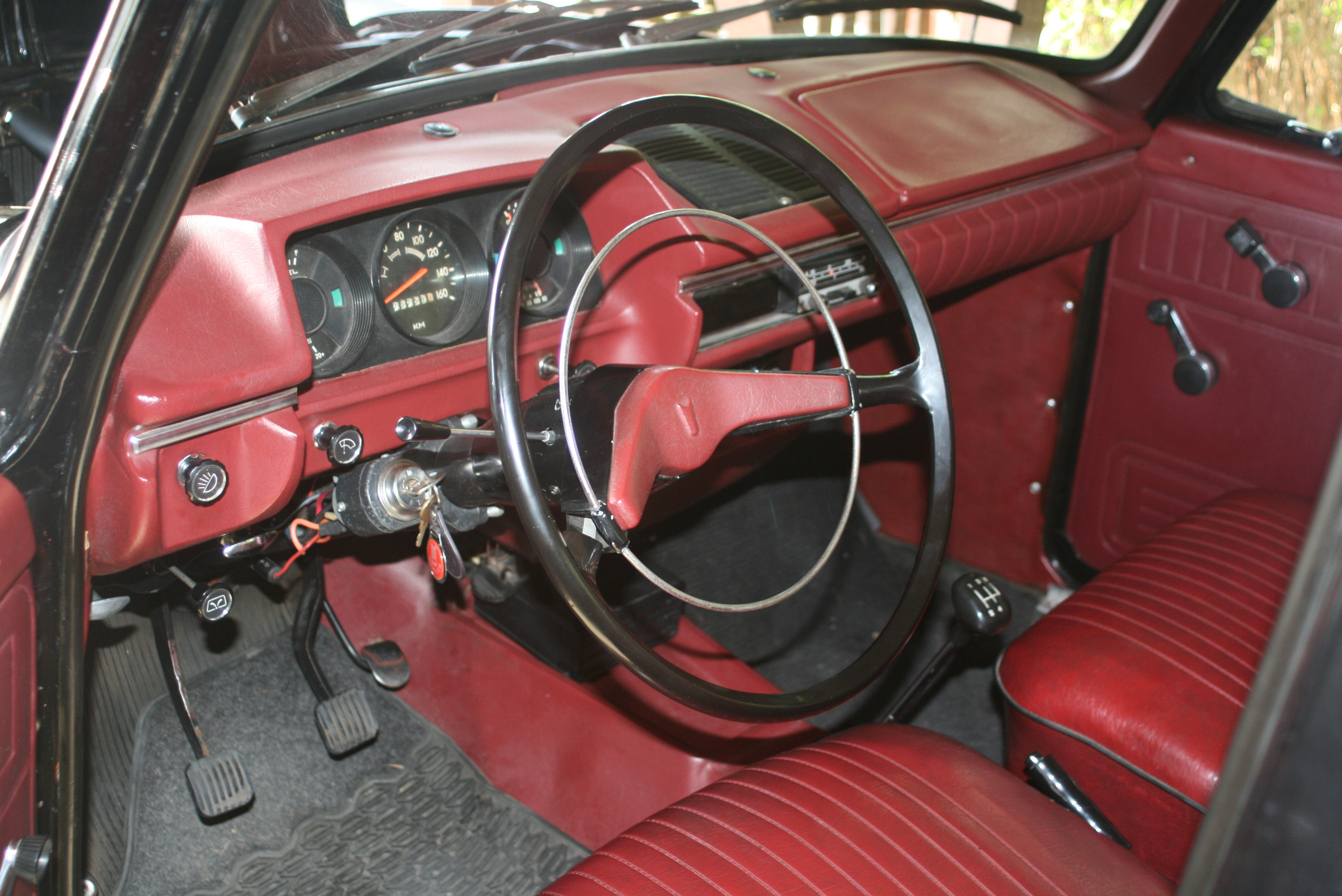
M-412 dashboard

The original M-412 of 1967–1969 had a chassis identical to that of the Moskvitch-408, which had been launched three years earlier in 1964. The only differences between the two models were the engines and the interior.

The main differences between the Moskvitch-412 and the Moskvitch-408 were:

	Moskvitch 412	Moskvitch 408
Production	1967–1976	1964–1976
Engine model	412	408
Chassis	408 (1967–1969); 412 (1969–1976)	408 (1964–1969); 412 (1969–1970)
Successor	Moskvitch 2140	Moskvitch 2138

The differences between the 412/408 chassis:

	1969–75	1967–69
Features	Square headlights; horizontal rear lights; triangular rear turn signal markers; separated front seats; floor-mounted gearshift lever (except for the 408, which had column-mounted shifter until 1973).	2 or 4 (twin) round headlights (Izh-412: 1967 –1982); vertical rear lights; front bench seat (until 1968); column-mounted gearshift lever (on the 408 until 1973, on the 412 until the fall of 1968).

== Prototype variants ==
In 1970, Moskvitch built a prototype of the M-353, a restyled hatchback version of the M-412 that was larger but recognizably related. The M-355 of 1972 was larger still, with 23 cm (9.1 in) greater length, 14 cm (5.5 in) more wheelbase, and 8 cm (3.1 in) more width. This made both the interior and the boot noticeably larger. The M-355 was further developed into the M-356 between 1973 and 1975, with "much bolder front end styling", new suspension, and an enlarged 1,799 cc (109.8 cu in) version of the Moskvitch-DM with twin Zenith carburetors, giving 103 hp (77 kW; 104 PS), with a Borg-Warner transmission planned. None were built.

== Front end variants ==
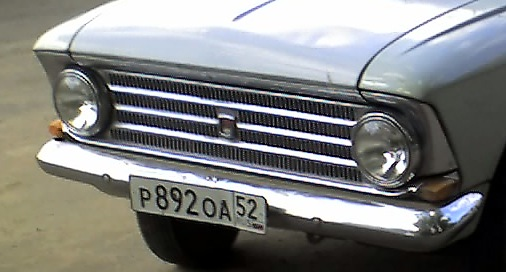
Pre-facelift (1967-1969) front end design with AZLK logo.

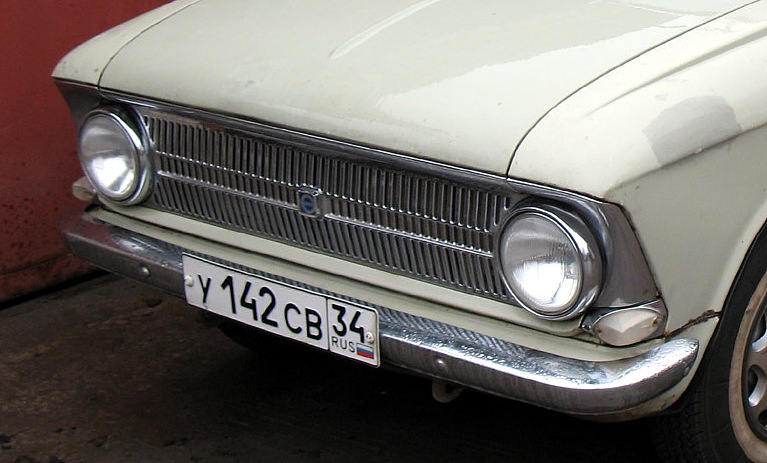
IE-era (1970-1982) front end design for Izh Moskvich-412, it has two horizontal bars as opposed to three before the facelift.

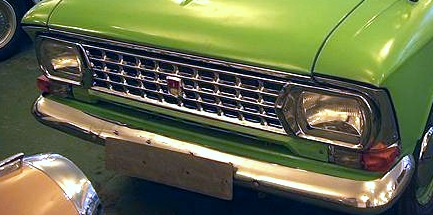
One of the IE-era front end designs, this large-cell "iron grid" grille was used through 1972-1973.

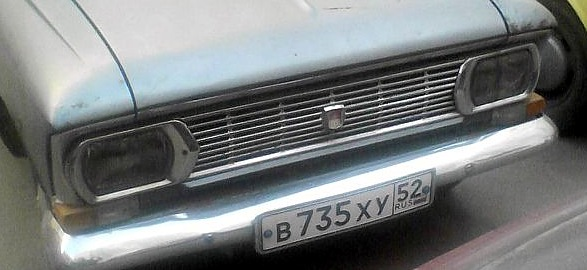
The more common IE-era front end design with the small-cell grille, used through the entire 1969-1976 run.

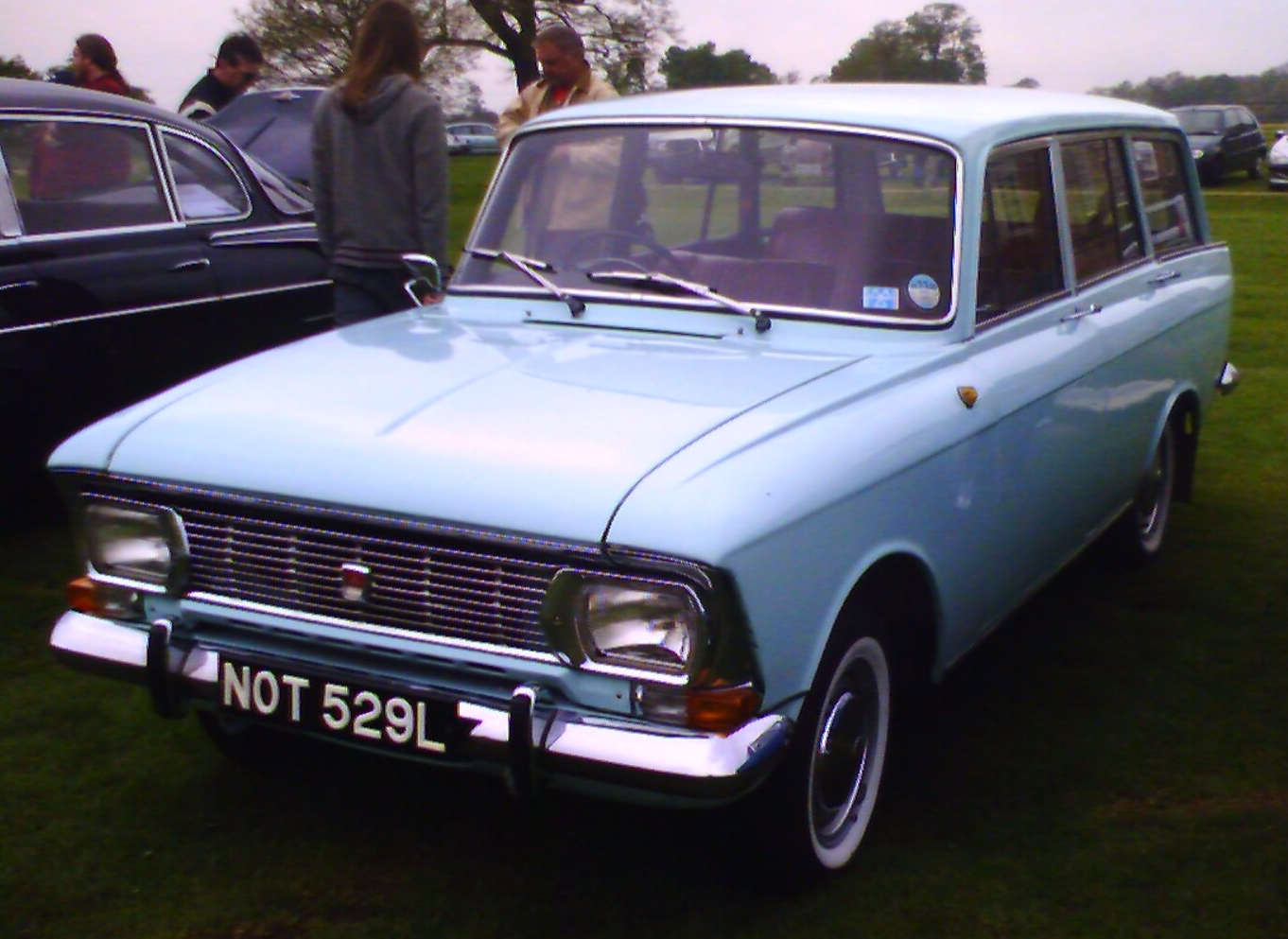
Right-hand-drive Moskvitch-427IE with the standard small-cell facelifted grille.

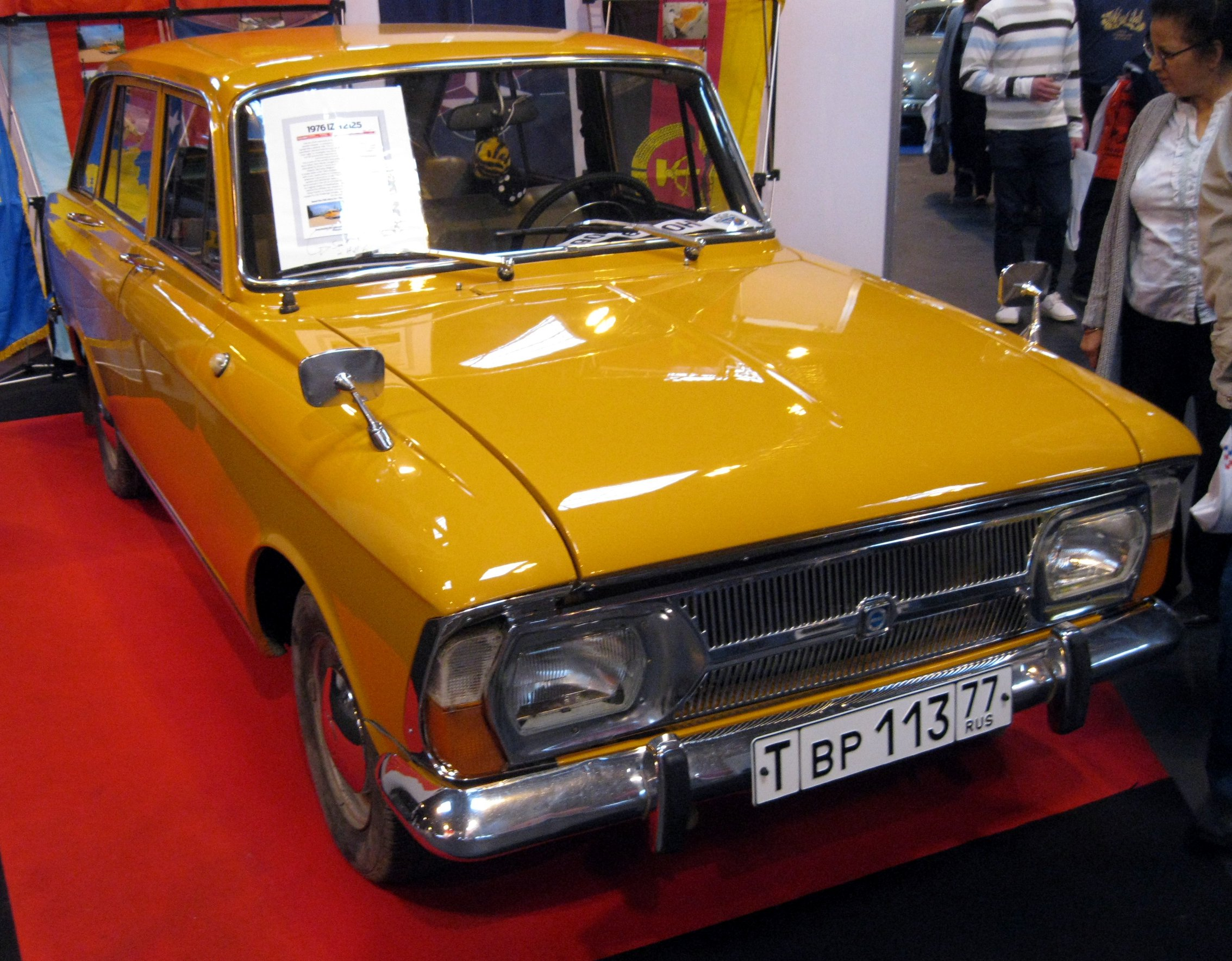
The front end design of the pre-facelift Izh-2125 Kombi (1973-1982); unlike the other M-412 variants and derivatives, its turn signal/side marker units were positioned vertically.

== Modifications ==
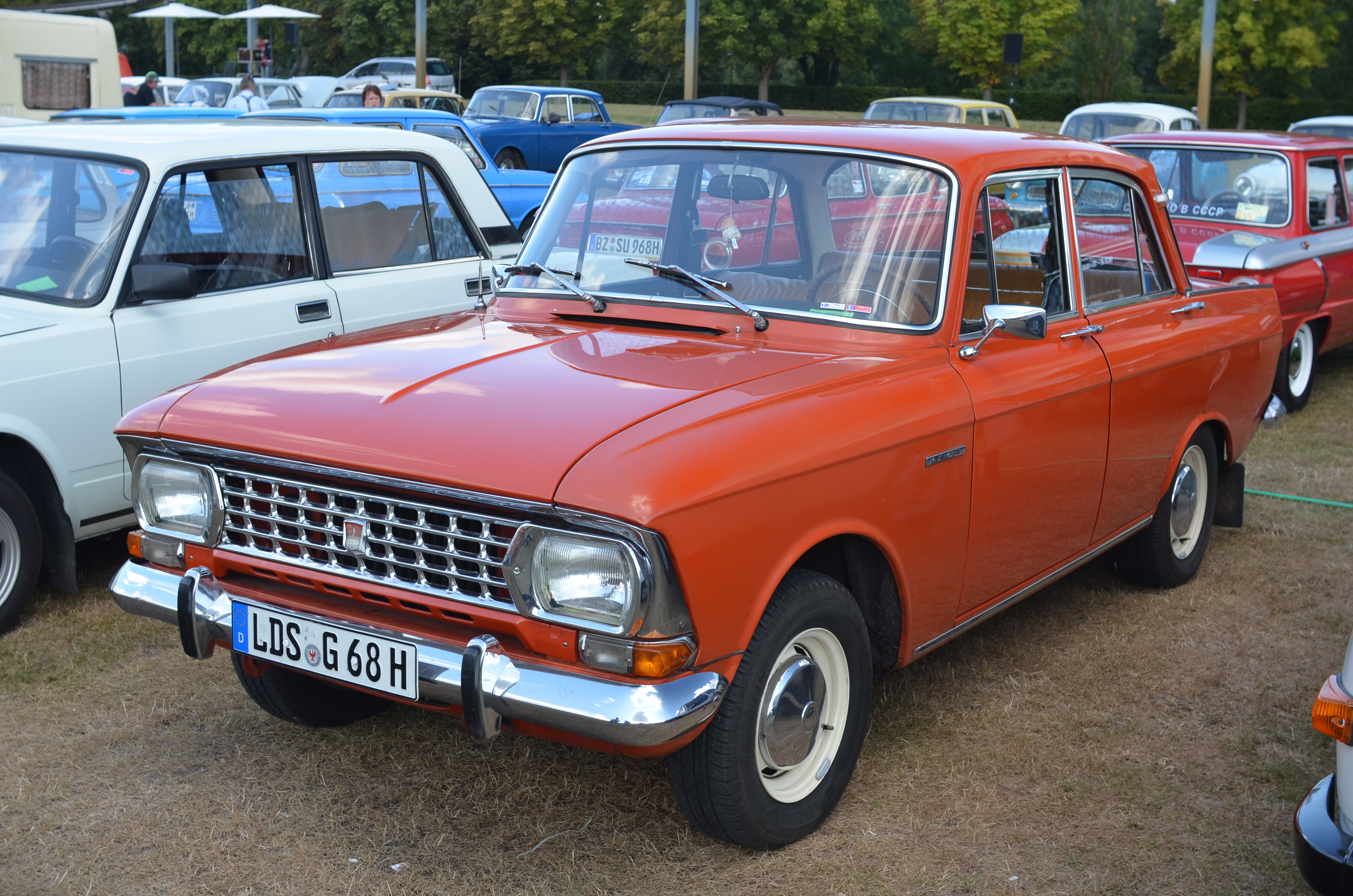
Moskvitch-412

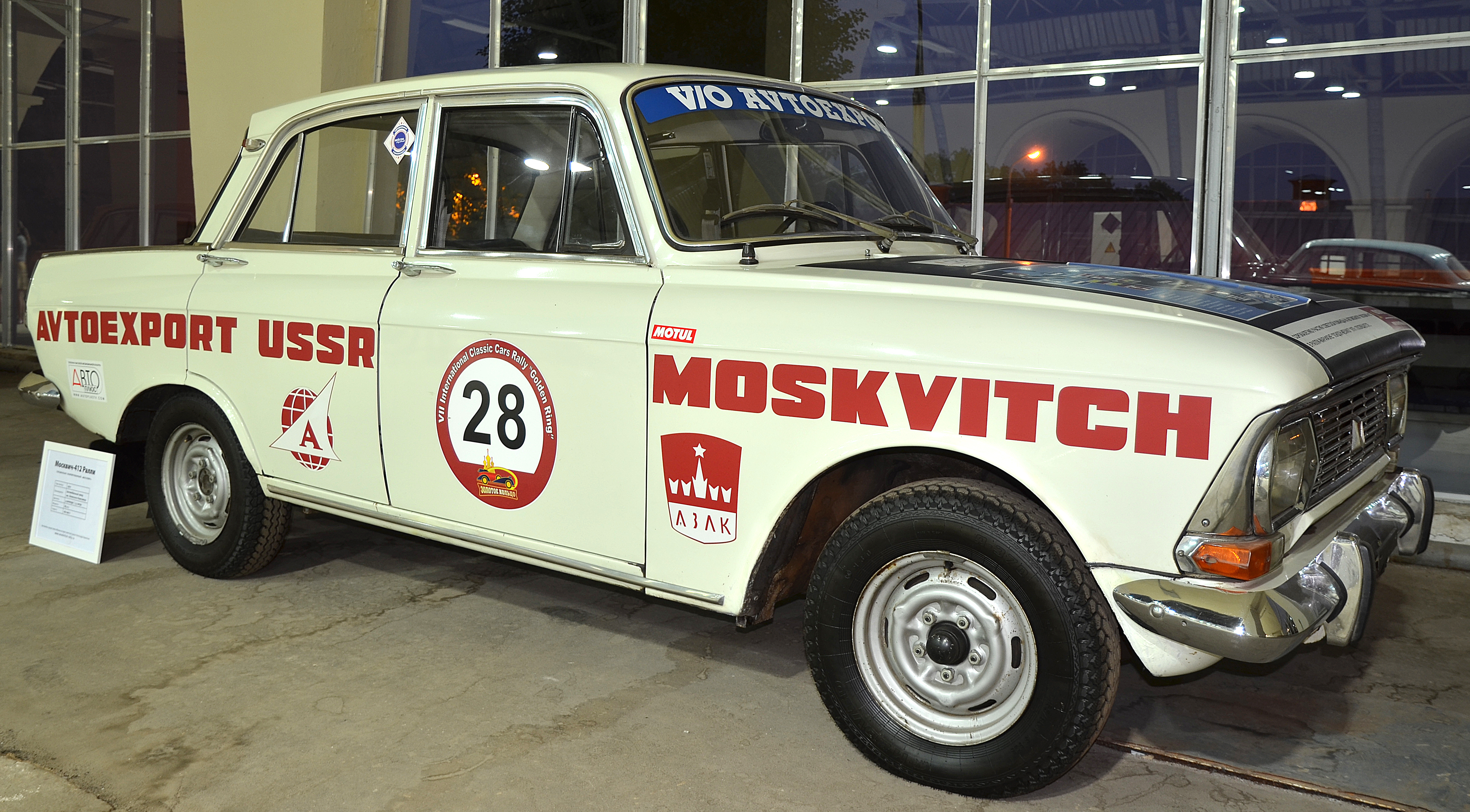
Rally car

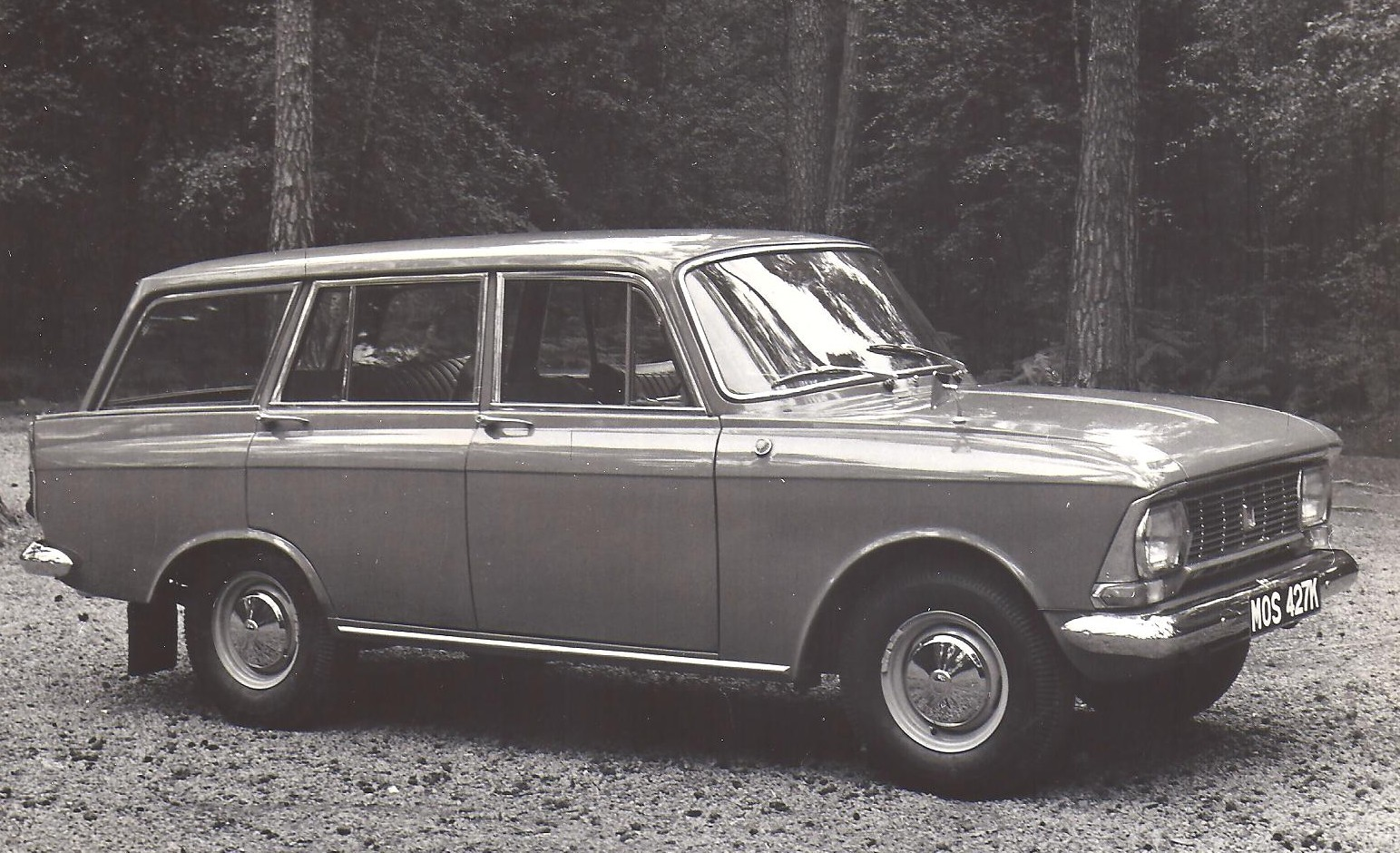
Moskvitch 427 estate

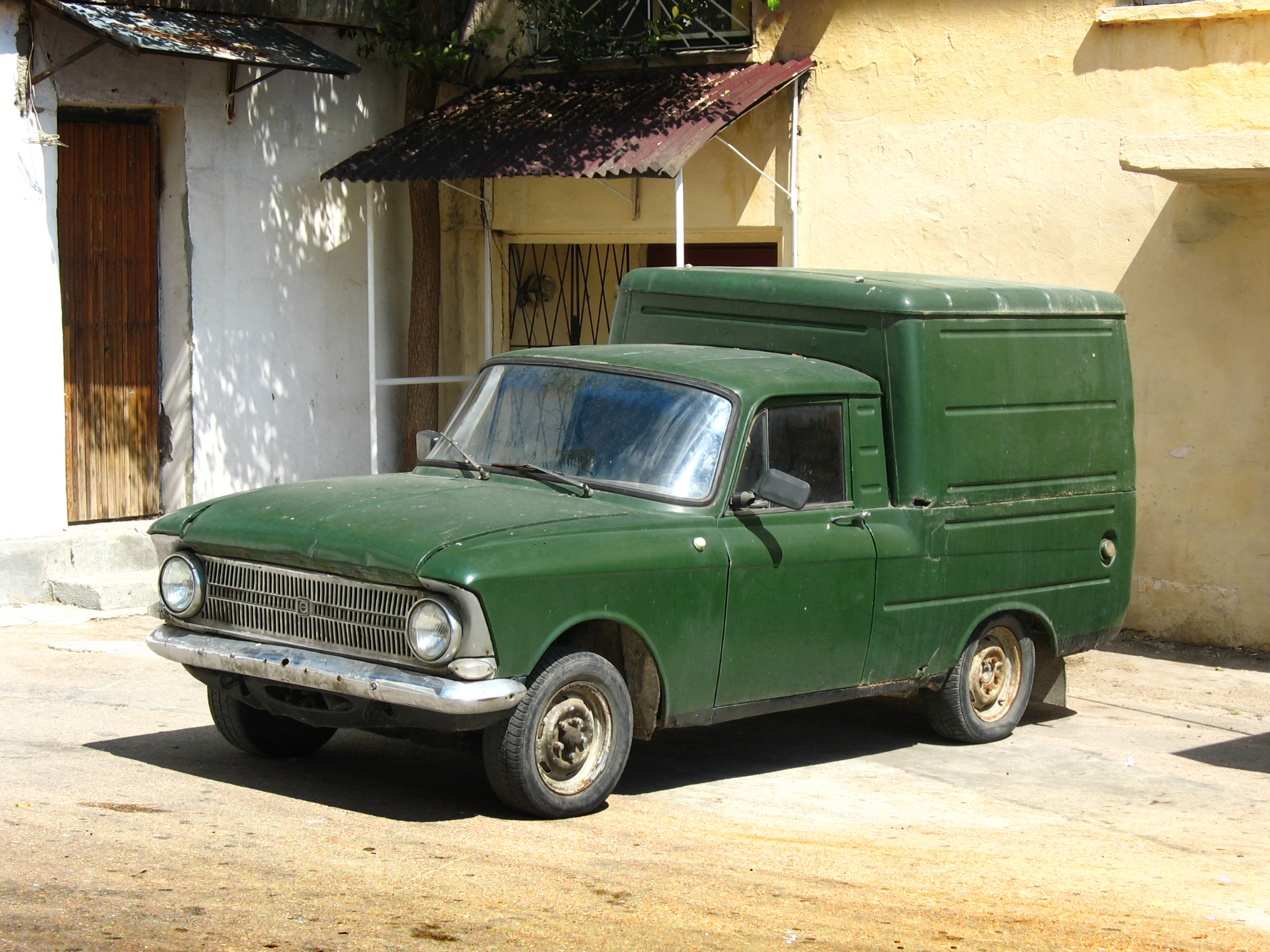
Izh-2715 van (1972–1982)

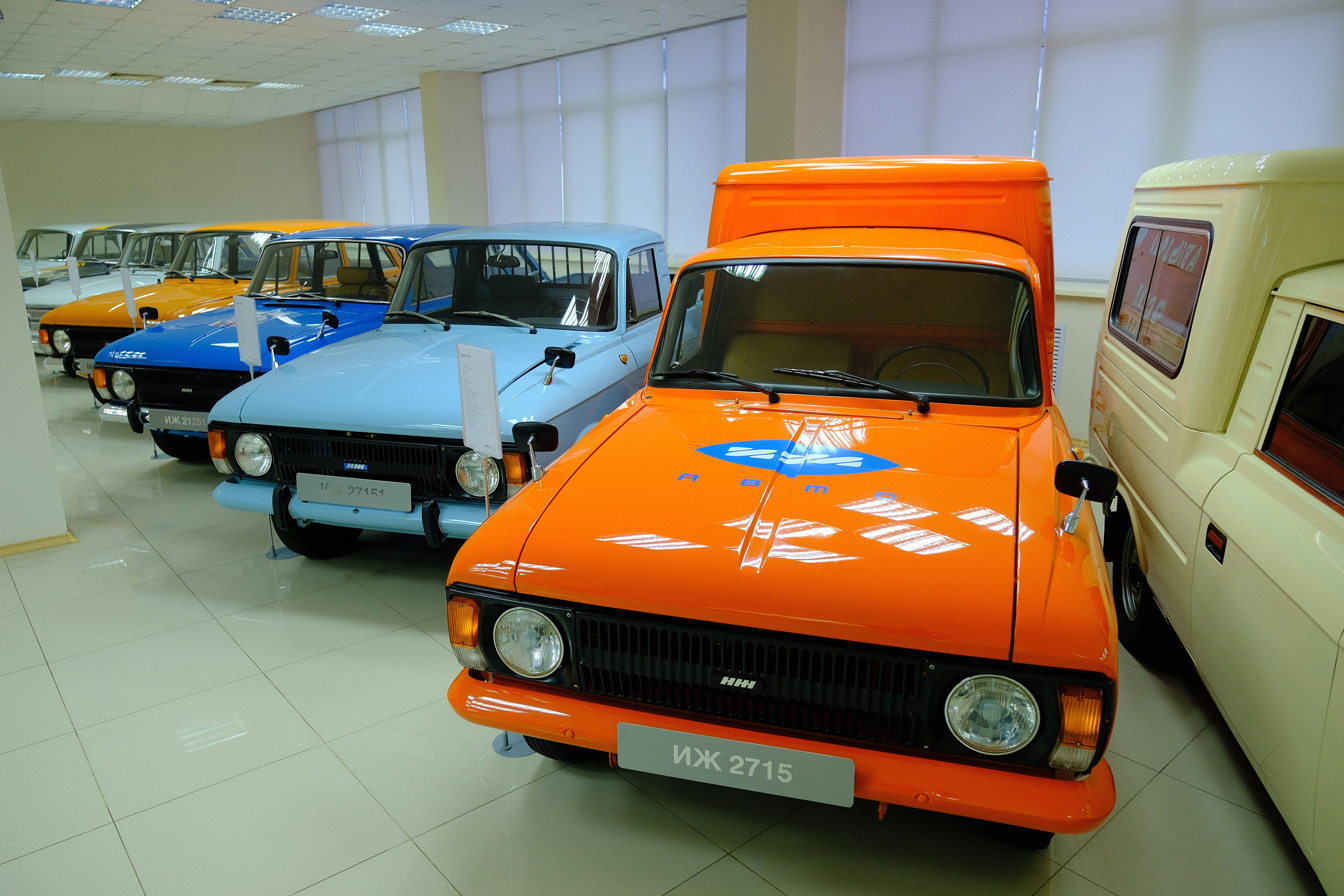
Izh-2715-01 van (1982–1997)

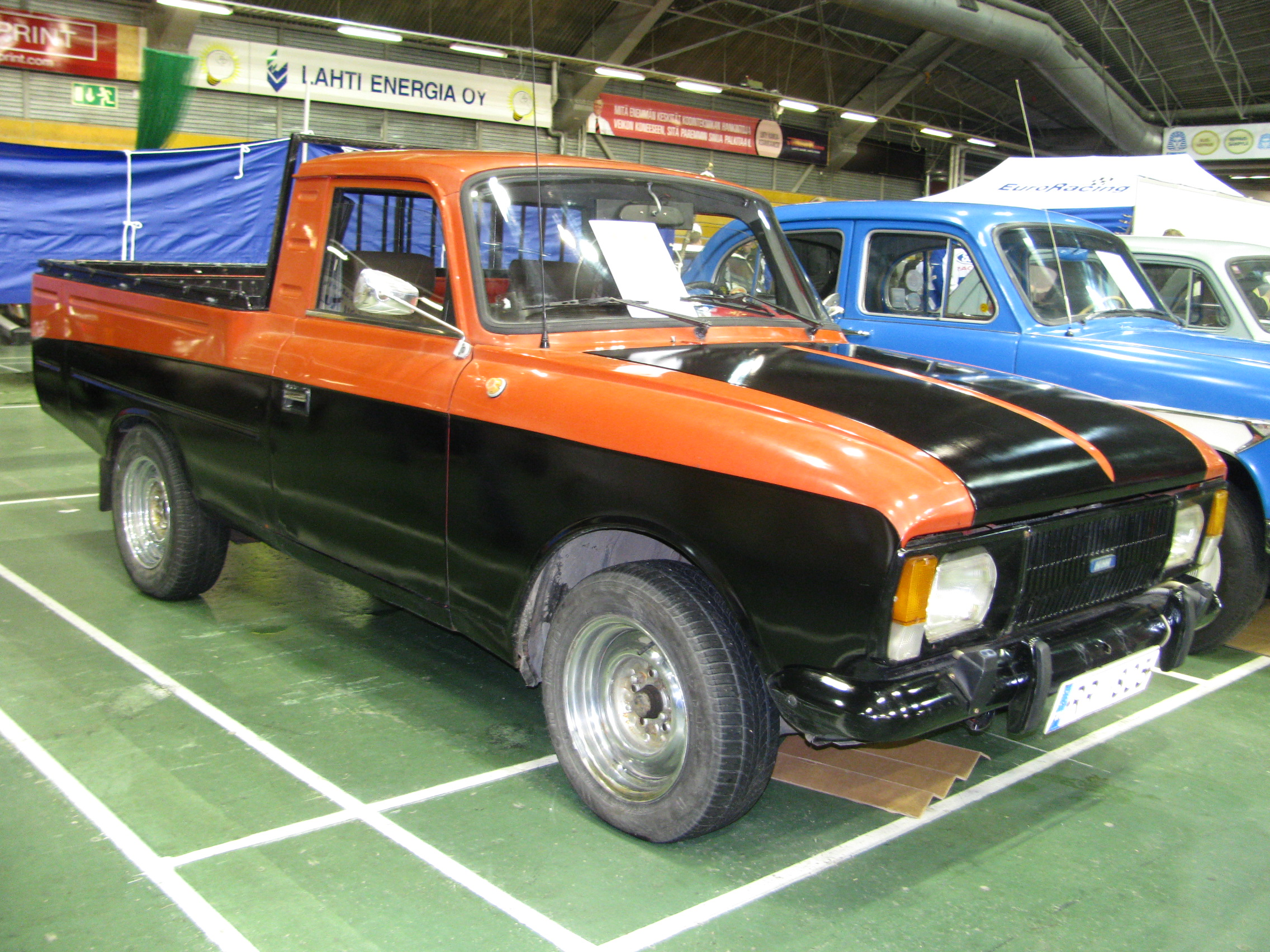
IZh-27151-013-01 Pickup truck

== Sales in the UK ==
The M-412 was launched in the United Kingdom in 1969, when the first 20 dealerships were set up and some 300 cars were sold. Sales increased annually and peaked in 1973, when 3462 cars were sold through a 268-dealer network, but collapsed to 344 in 1975. Although the car was designed with attention to passive safety and passed safety tests in France, Bulgaria, Czechoslovakia, Sweden, and West Germany, receiving an international safety certificate as a result of almost five months of tests in Montlhéry, the publication of a Consumers Association report in 1973 branding the car as "dangerously unsafe" did not help the Moskvich in the marketplace, even though its safety record was in response publicly defended by the managing director of the importing company, citing positive reviews from Moskvitch owners involved in traffic collisions. The 1973 introduction of the significantly more modern Lada 1200 was a probable major factor in the sales slump. Importer Satra's 1974 rebranding of the M-412 to the Moskvitch-1500 had no effect, forcing the company to withdraw from the UK market in 1976.
