= List of Moskvitch vehicles =

This is a list of vehicles designed or produced by AZLK, a defunct Russian carmaker best known under its Moskvitch brand.

== Vehicles by generation ==
=== First (1940–1956) ===
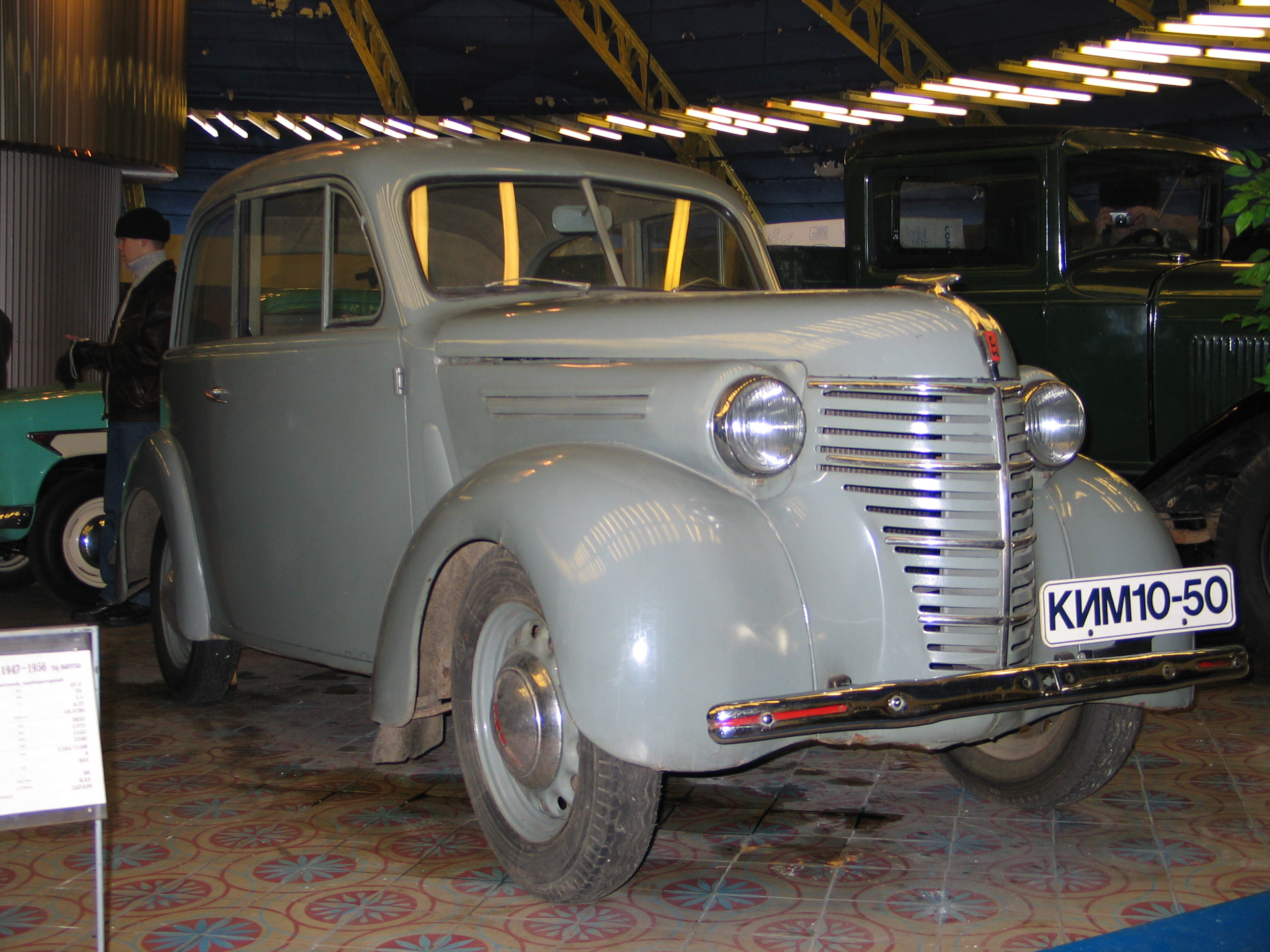
KIM-10-50

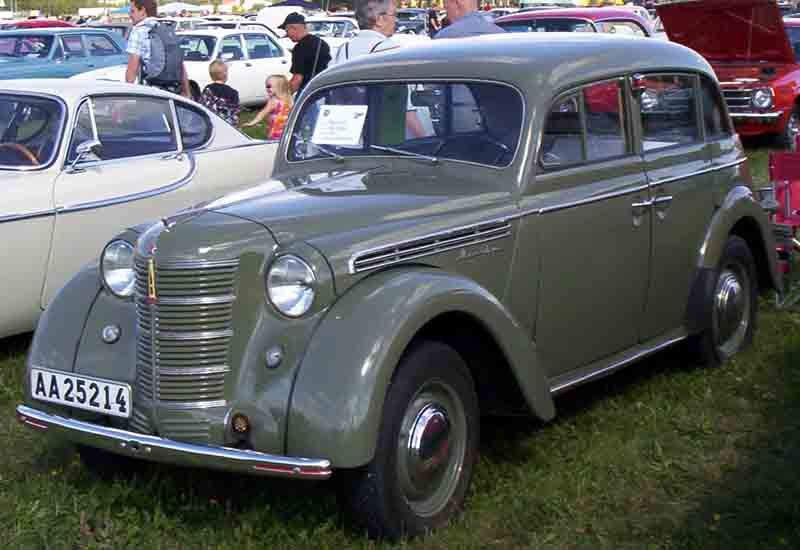
Moskvitch-400

- KIM-10-50 (1940–1941) 2-door compact car
  - KIM-10-51 (1941) the same car with a Phaeton body
  - KIM-10-52 (1945) 4-door compact car
- Moskvitch 400-420 Flathead engine, 23 hp (1946–1954) – copy of 1939 Opel Kadett K38
  - Moskvitch 400-420A (4-door convertible, priced below closed models but low sales) (1949–52)
  - Moskvitch 400-420B (version of 400 for disabled persons)
  - Moskvitch 400-420K (cab-chassis version of 400)
  - Moskvitch 400-420M (medical sedan version of 400)
  - Moskvitch 400–421 (prototype five-door version of 400–422) (1946)
  - Moskvitch 400–422 (three-door "woodie" station wagon version of 400) (1949)
  - Moskvitch 400–424 (prototype for 401)
  - Moskvitch 400E-431-442 (airplane engine starter version of 400) (1951–1953)
  - Moskvitch 400P-431-441 (prototype truck based on 400) (1951)
- Moskvitch 401–420 Flathead engine, 26 hp (1954–1956)
  - Moskvitch 401-420B (invalid car version of 401)
  - Moskvitch 401-420K (cab-chassis version of 401)
  - Moskvitch 401-420M (medical sedan version of 401)
  - Moskvitch 401–422 ("woodie" station wagon version of 401) (1954)
  - Moskvitch 401–423 (prototype redesigned version of 401) (1949–1951)
  - Moskvitch 401A1-420 (401 powered by 402 engine) (1956)

=== Second (1956–1965) ===
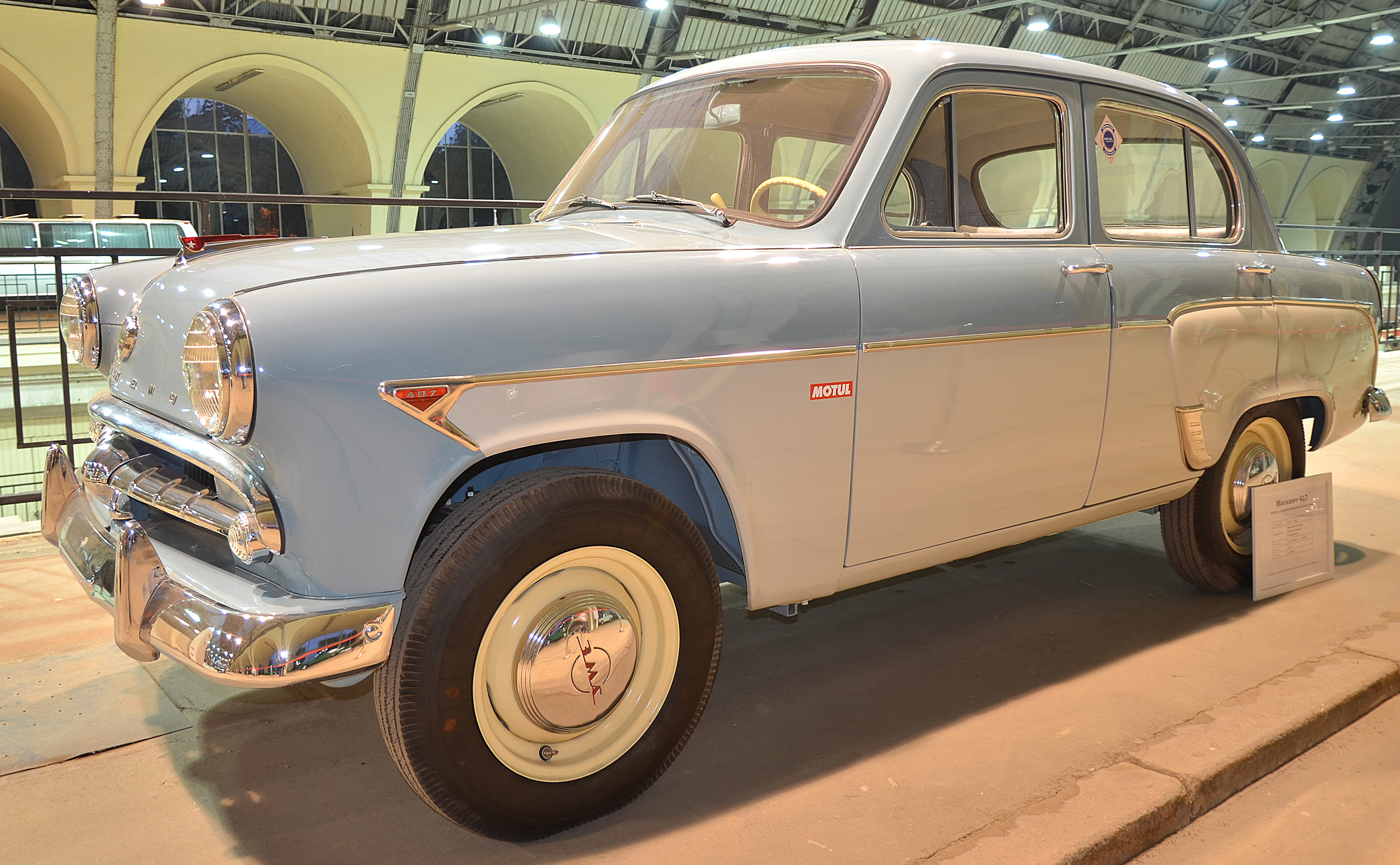
Moskvitch 402

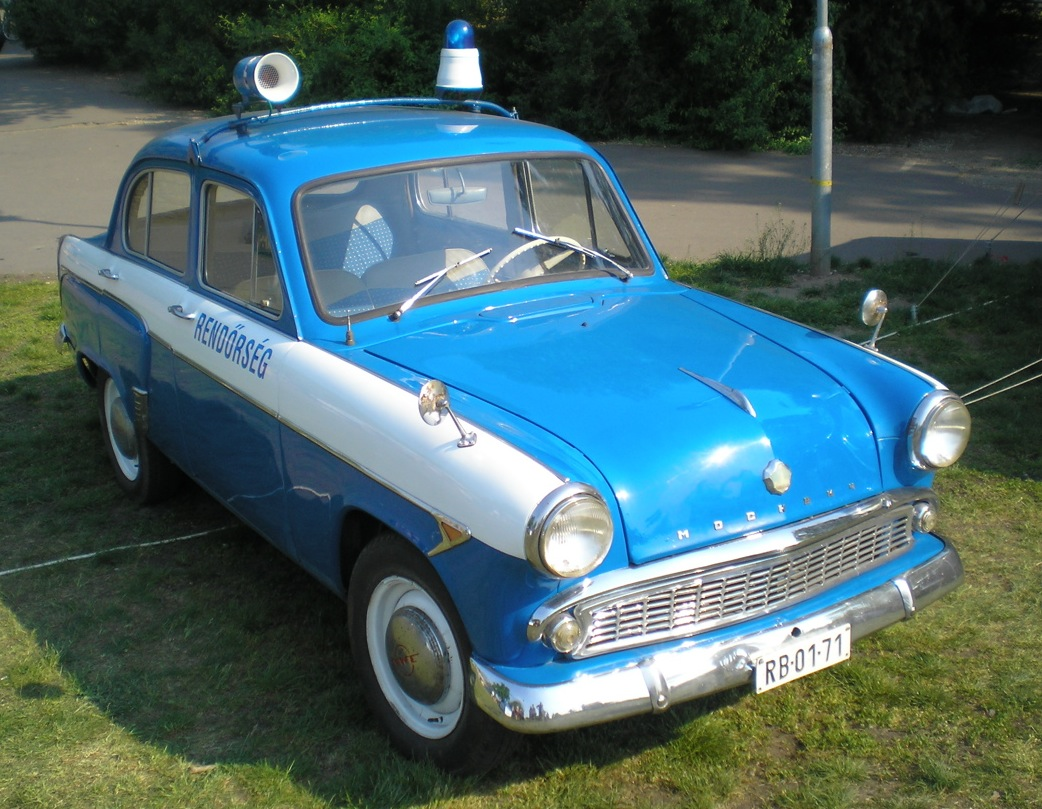
Moskvitch 407 with late-version eggcrate grille

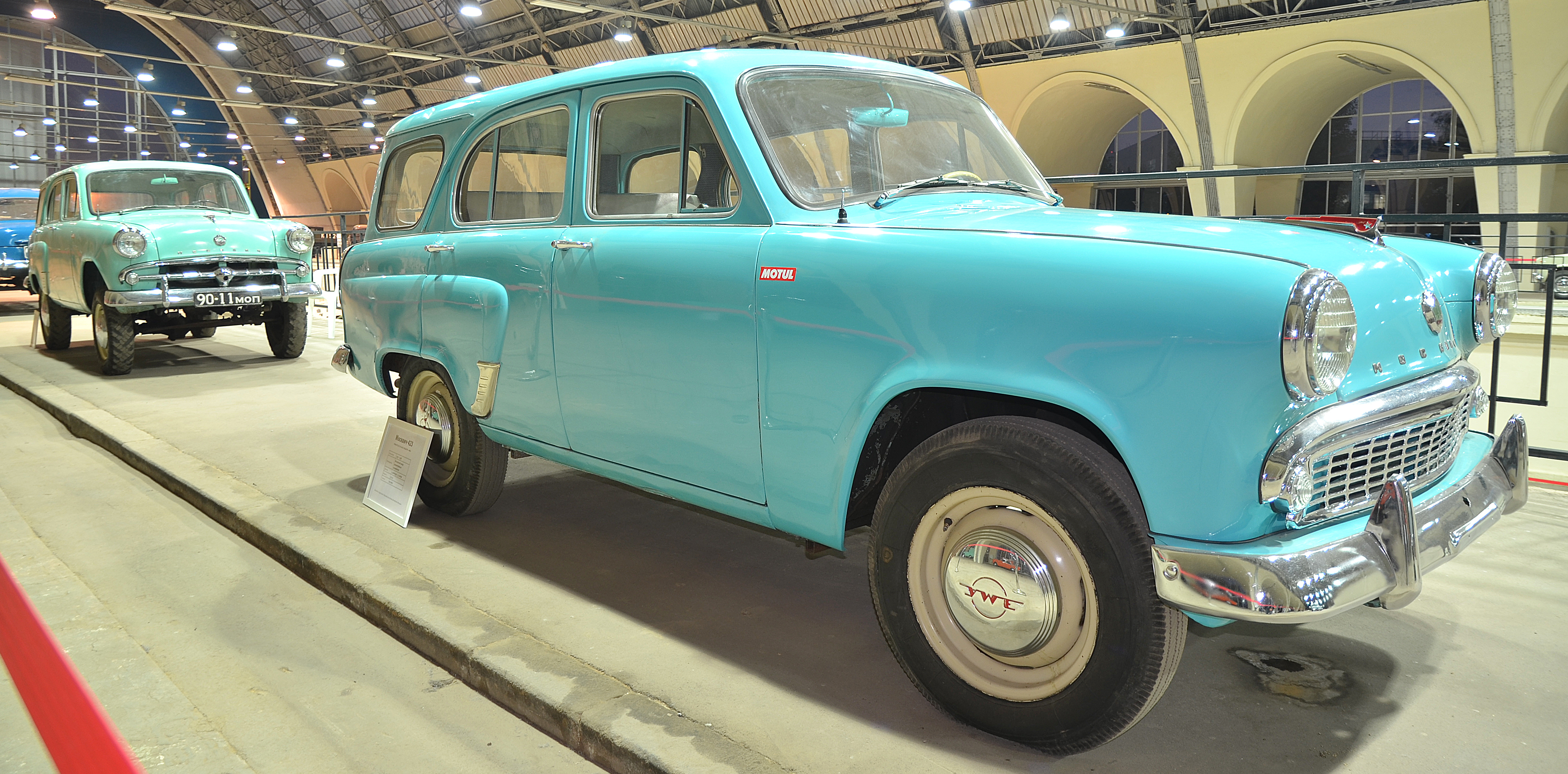
Moskvitch 423, the first Soviet non-woodie station wagon

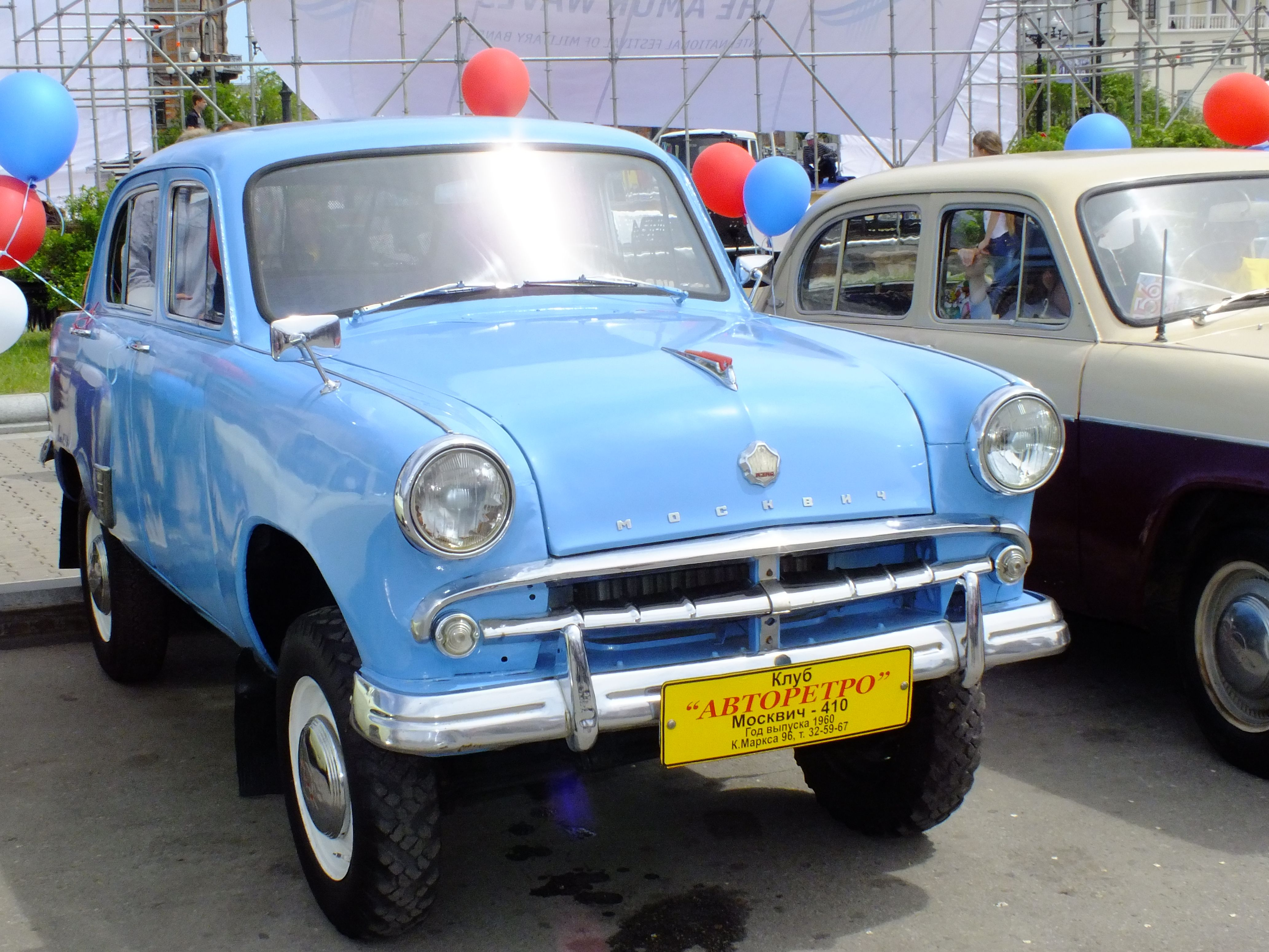
A four-wheel-drive Moskvitch 410

- Moskvitch 402 (with modified Opel flathead engine 35 hp) (1956–1958)
  - Moskvitch 423 (station wagon version of 402) (1957–1958)
  - Moskvitch 429 (two-door delivery van prototype, based on 402)
  - Moskvitch 430 (two-door delivery van version of 423) (1958)
- Moskvitch 410 (four-wheel drive version of 402) (1957–1958)
  - Moskvitch 410N (four wheel drive version of 407) (1958–1961)
  - Moskvitch 411 (station wagon version of 410) (1958–1961)
  - Moskvitch 431 (delivery van prototype, based on 410N)
- Moskvitch 407 (45 hp OHV engine) (1958–1964)
  - Moskvitch 423N (station wagon version of 407) (1958–1963)
- Moskvitch 403 (45 hp OHV engine) (1962–1965)
  - Moskvitch 424 (station wagon version of 403) (1963–1965)
  - Moskvitch 432 (delivery van version of 403) (1964)

=== Third (1965–1986) ===
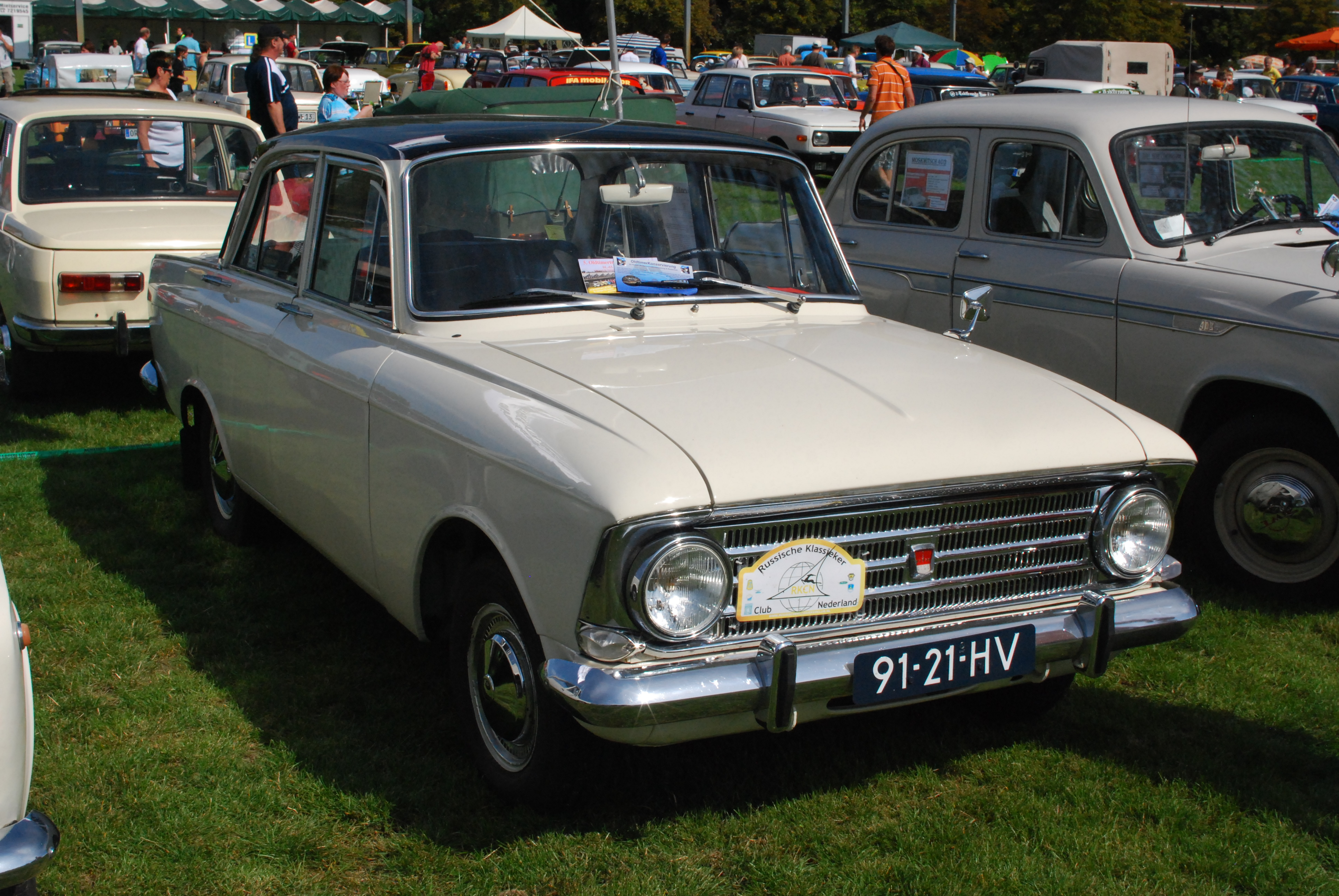
Moskvitch 408

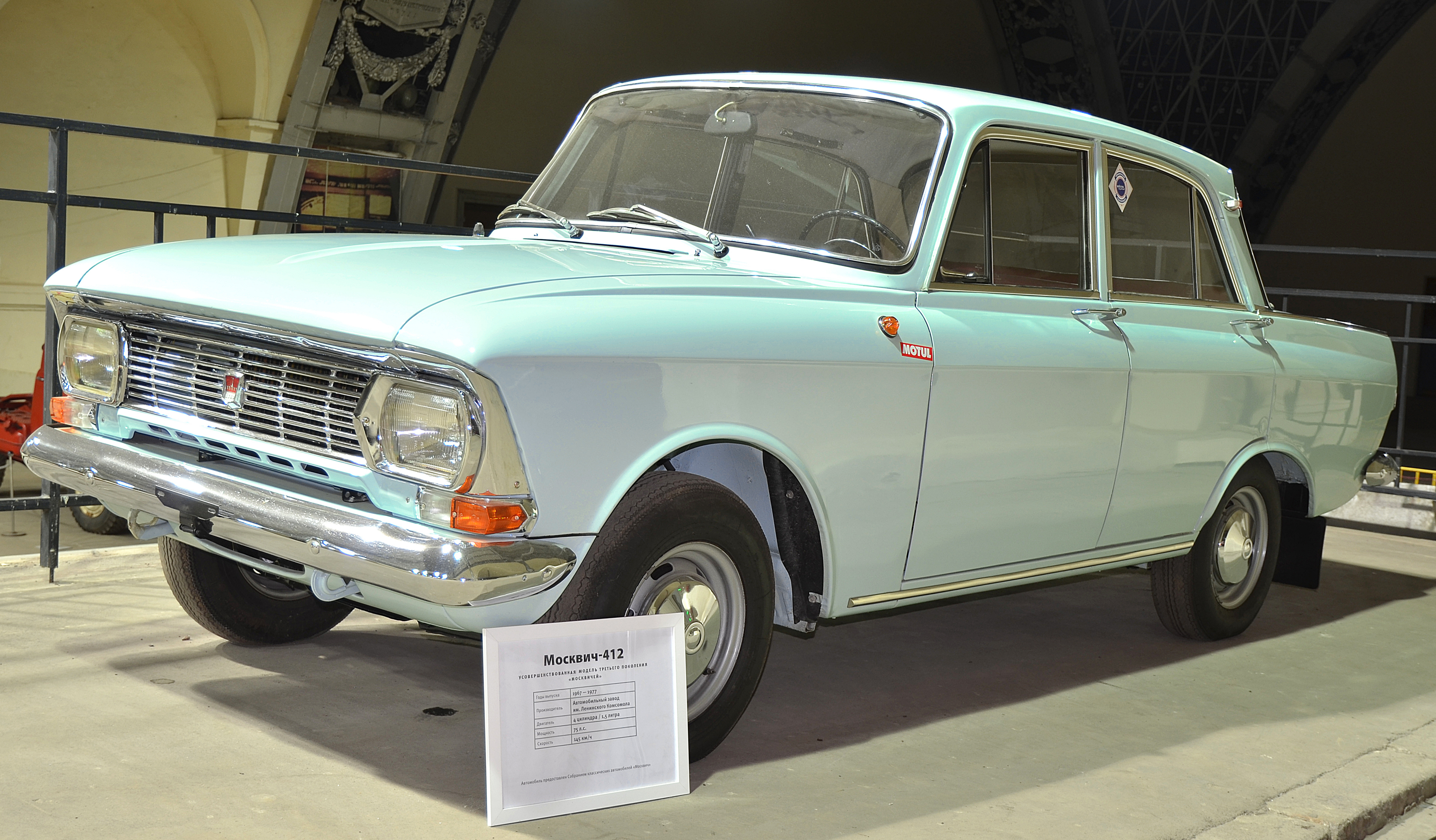
Moskvitch 412 from the late 1960s and early 1970s

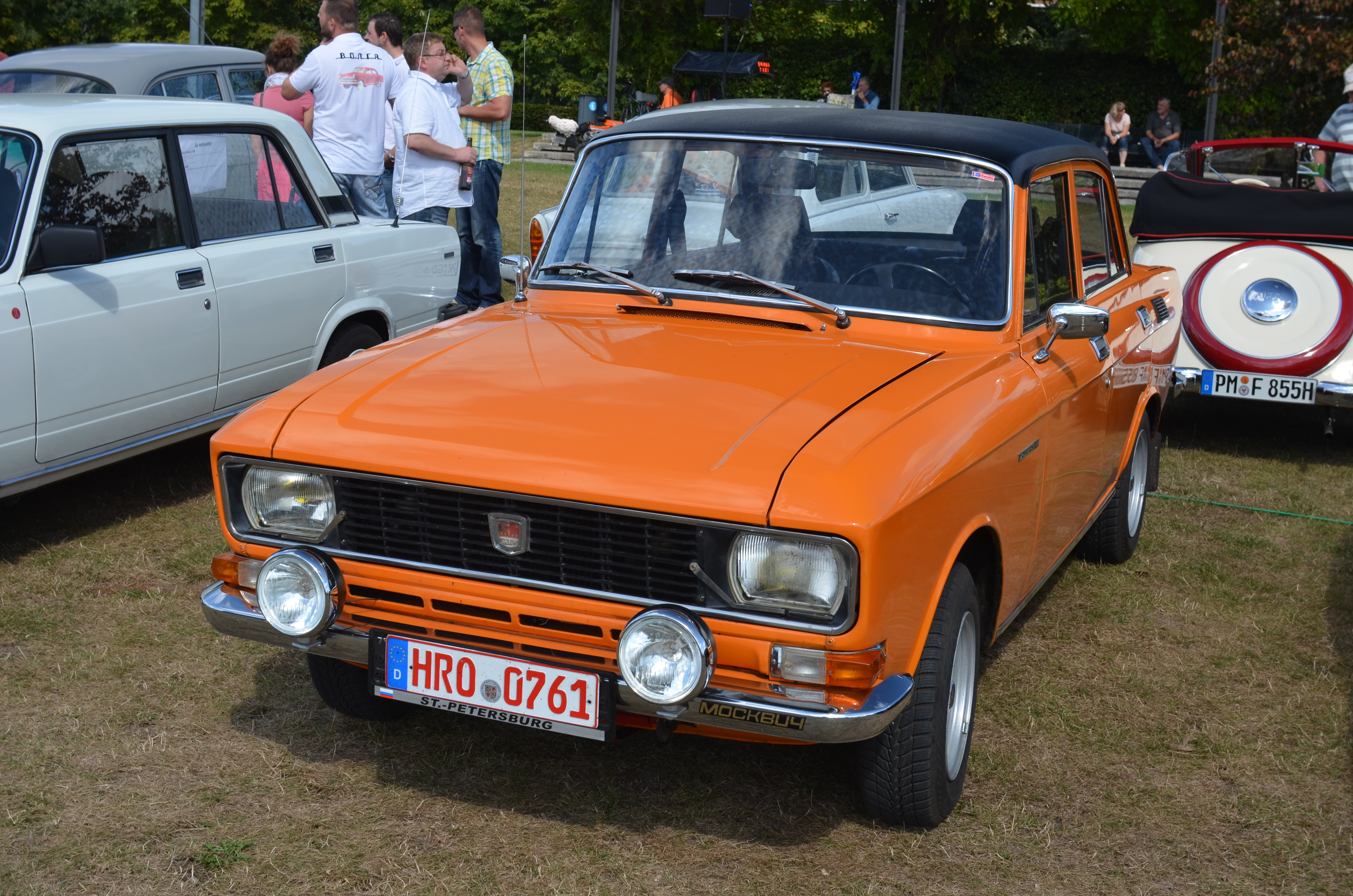
Moskvitch 2138/40

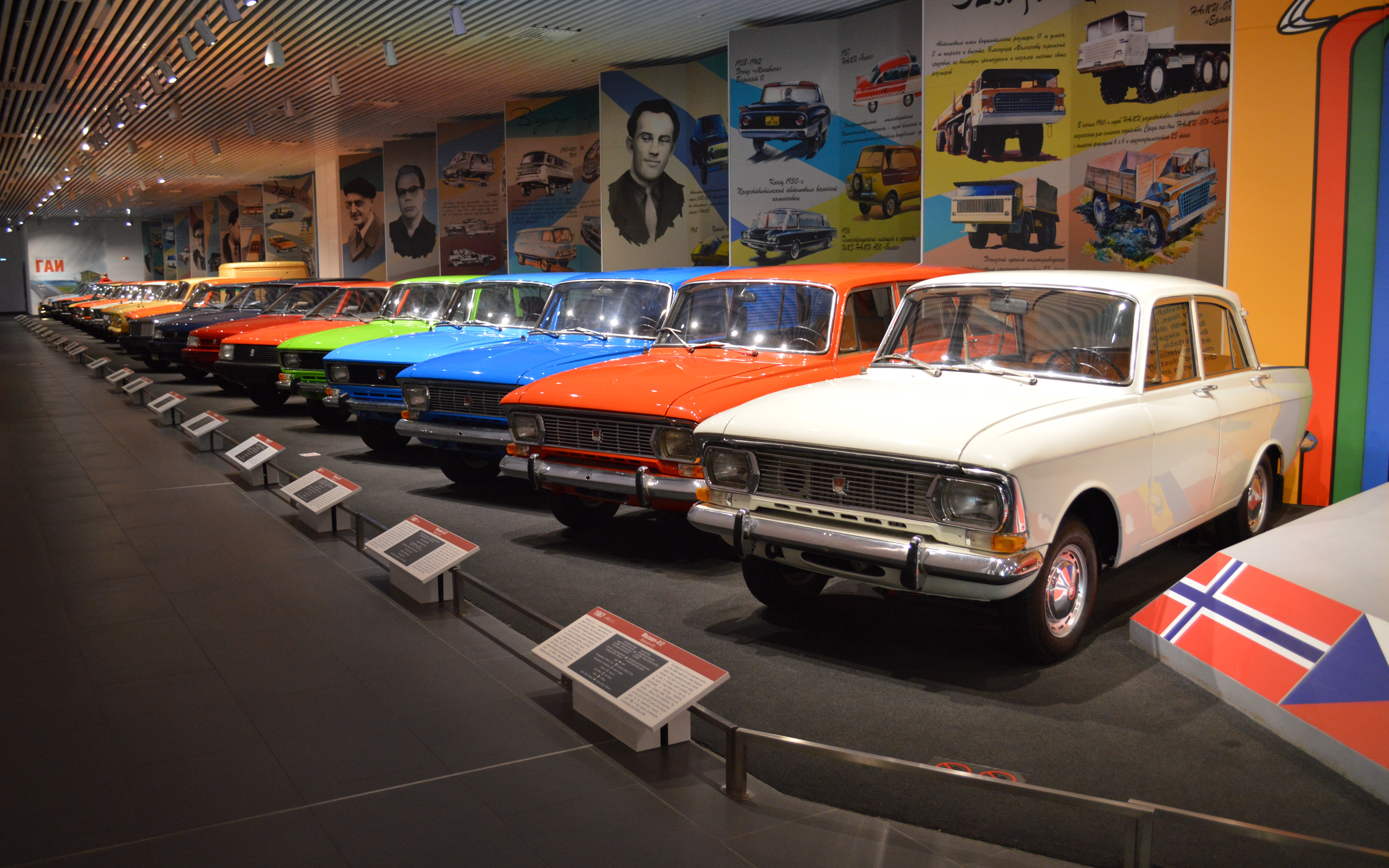
Moskvitch models, starting with 412
- Moskvitch 408 OHV 50 PS (37 kW; 49 hp), modified 1360 cc 407-engine (1964–1975)
  - Moskvitch 433 (panel van version of 408) (1966–1975)
  - Moskvitch 426 (station wagon version of 408) (1967–1975)
- Moskvitch 412 (1967–1975) (latterly known as a Moskvitch 1500 for the Western export market)
  - Moskvitch 427 (station wagon version of 412) (1967–1975)
  - Moskvitch 434 (panel van version of 412) (1967–1975)
- Moskvitch-2140 (1976–1988) (carried on the scheme of using the Moskvitch 1500 name for Western exports)
  - Moskvitch 2136 (similar to 2137, but with 408 engine) (1976)
  - Moskvitch 2137 (station wagon version of 2140) (1976–1988)
  - Moskvitch 2734 (panel van version of 2140) (1976–1981)
  - Moskvitch 2138 (similar to 2140, but with 408 engine) (1976–1982)
  - Moskvitch 2140SL (1981–1986, also known as 1500SL) (improved 2140, Super Lux was made for foreign markets)
  - Moskvitch 2733 (panel van version of 2136)
  - Moskvitch Bolivar (tow truck prototype, based on 2140)

=== Fourth (1986–2003) ===
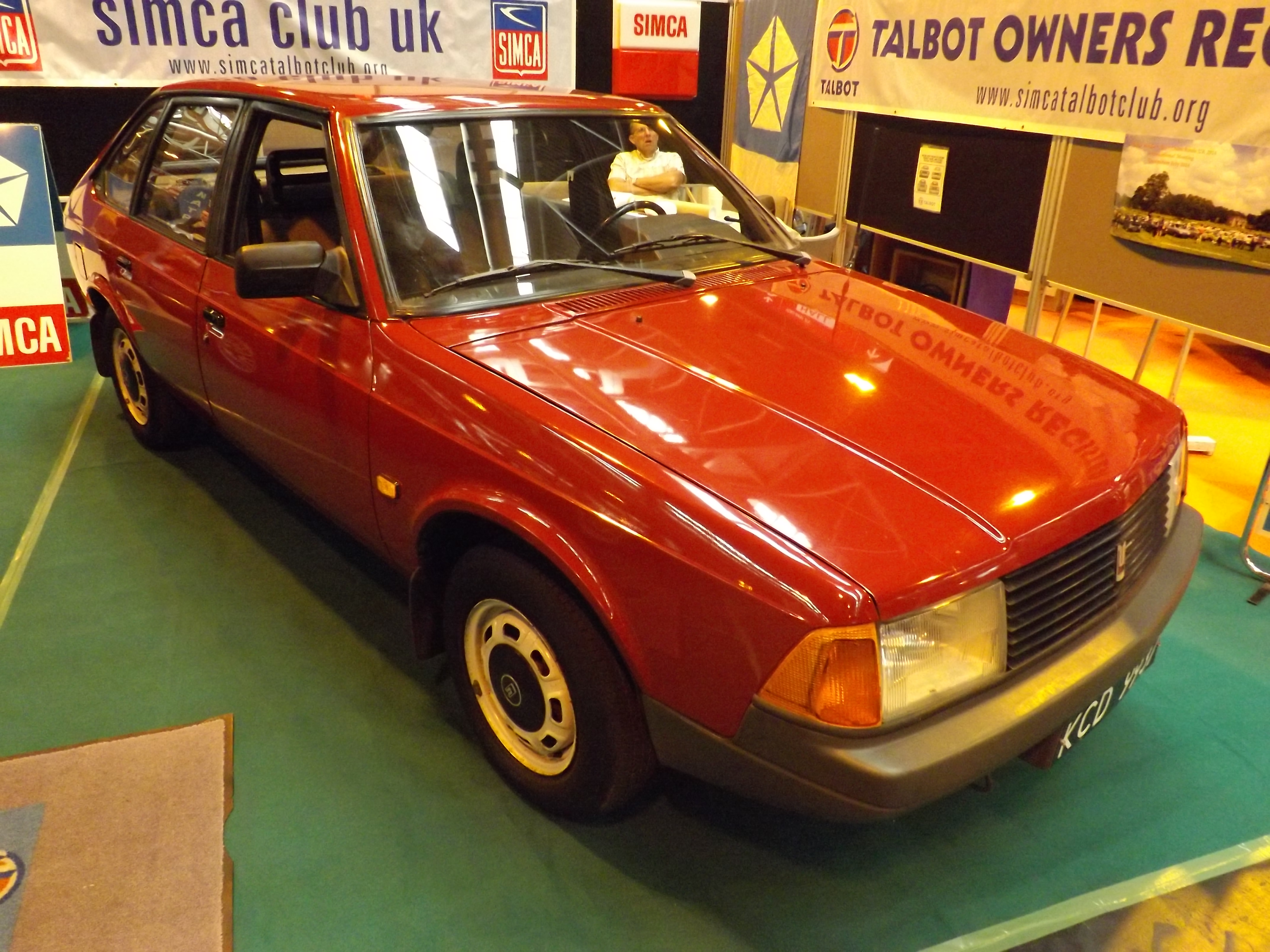
Moskvitch 2141

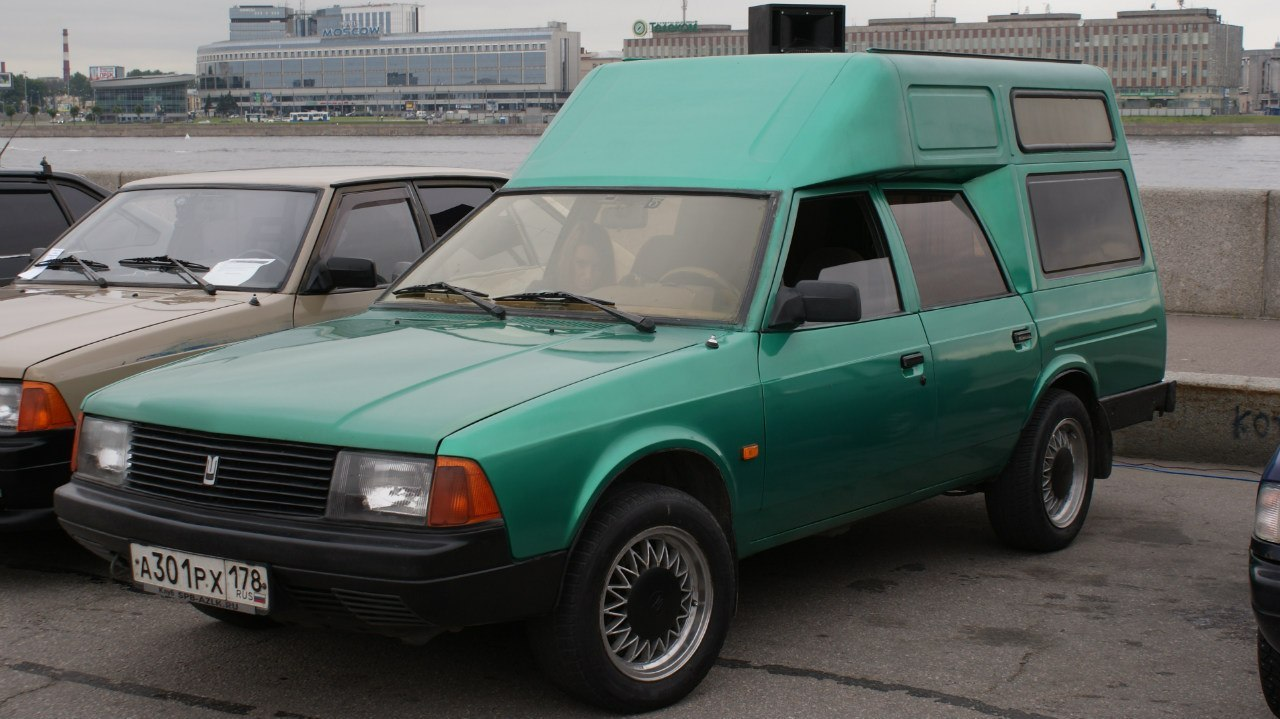
Moskvitch 2901

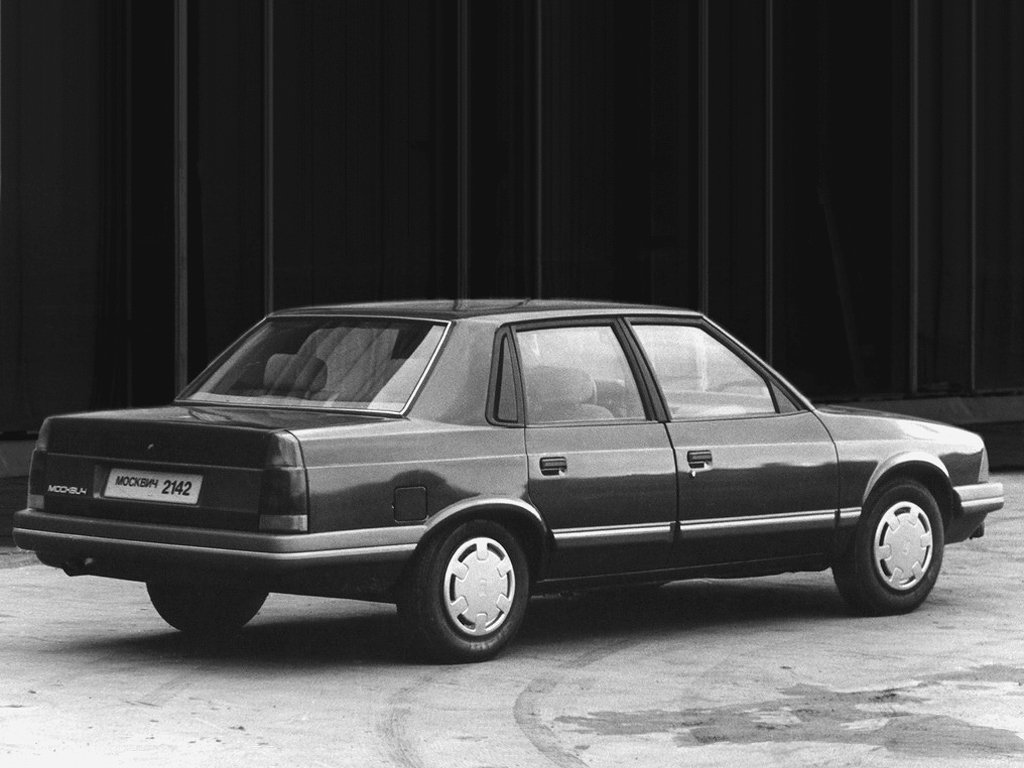
Moskvitch 2142 with sedan body (prototype)

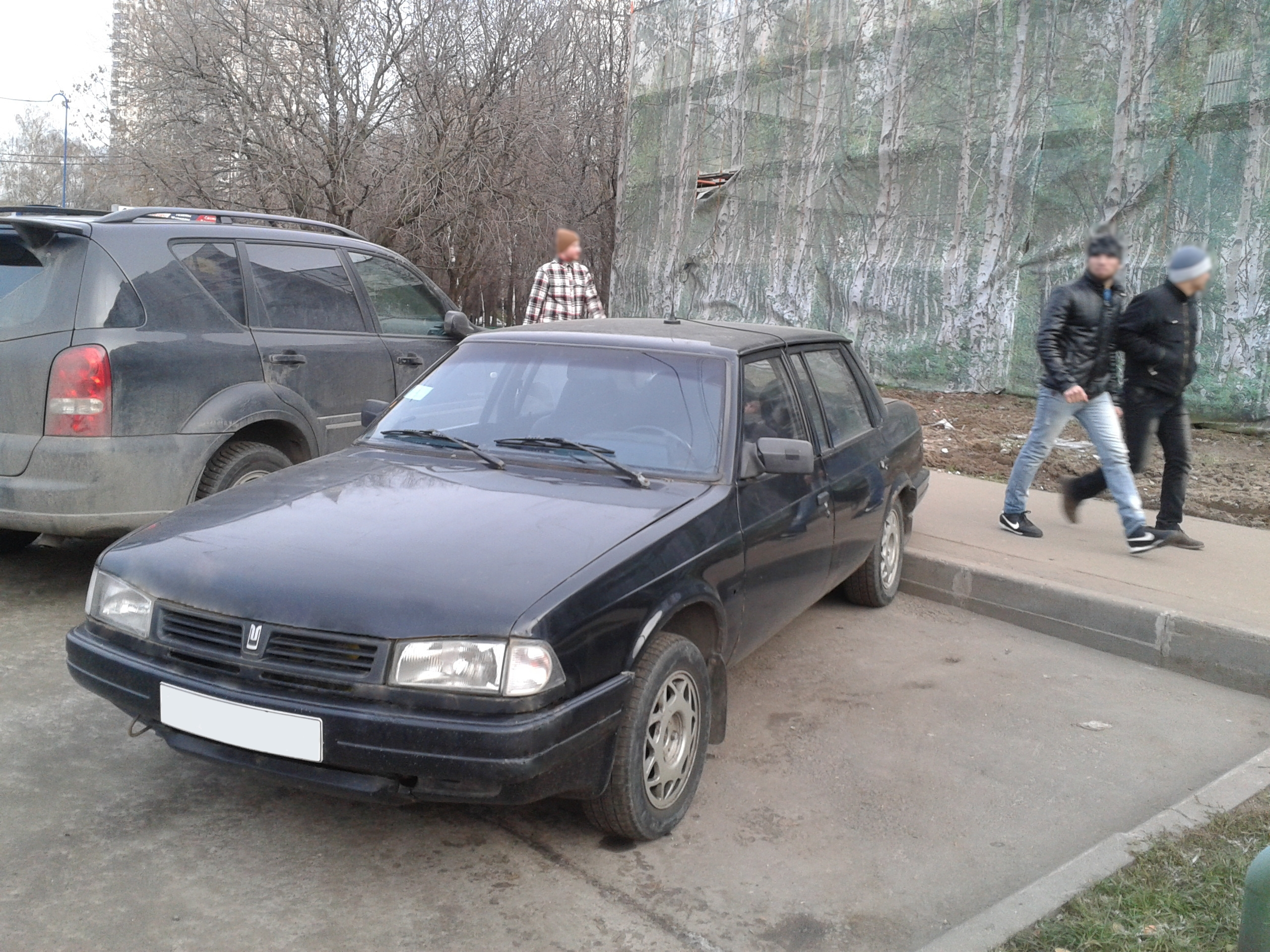
Moskvitch 2142R5

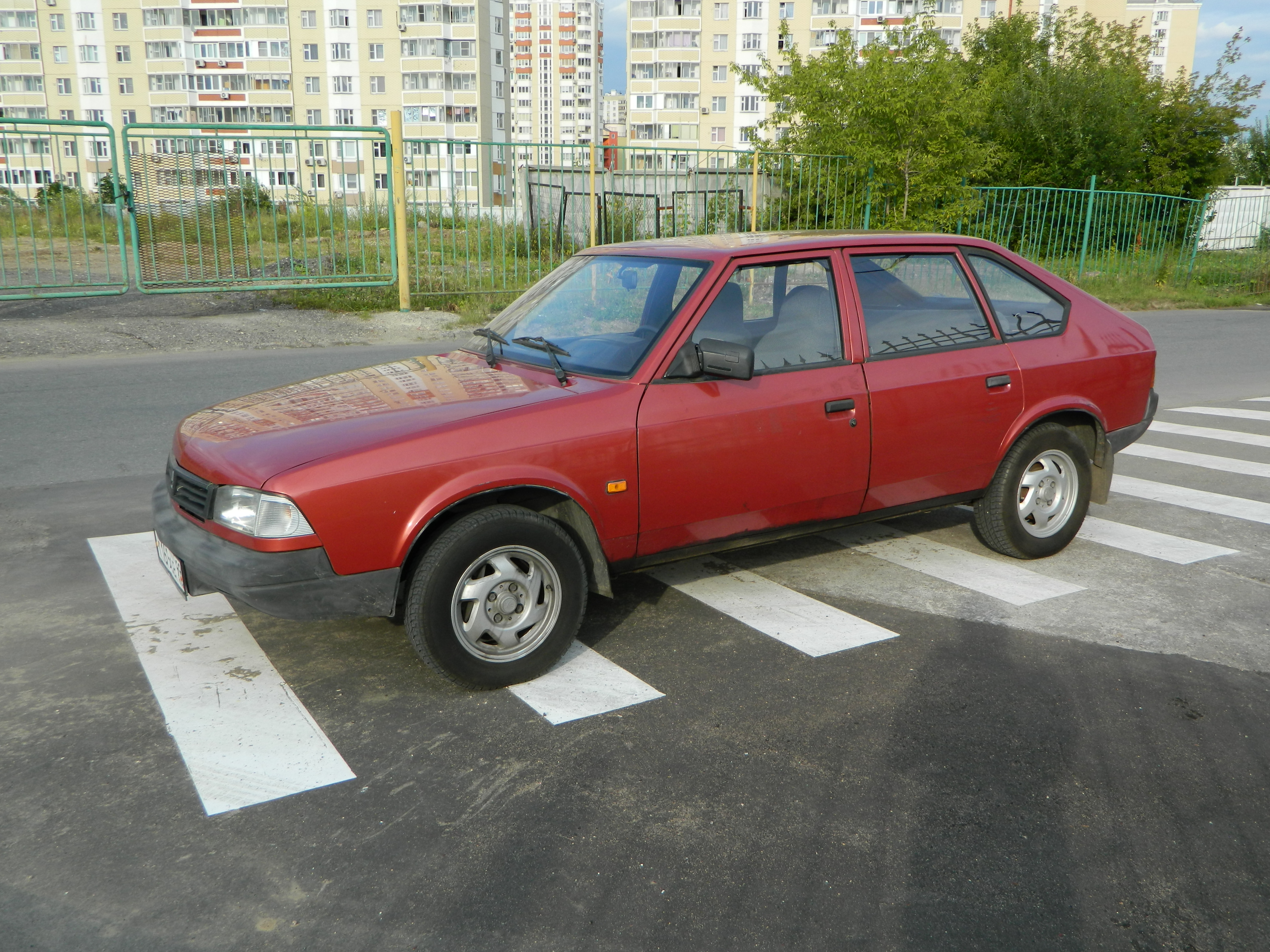
Moskvitch Sviatogor
- Moskvitch 2141 Aleko (1986–1997)
  - Moskvitch 2335 (1993, pickup truck based on 2141)
  - Moskvitch 2336 (cab-chassis truck based on 2141)
  - Moskvitch 2340 (all wheel drive version of 2335)
  - Moskvitch 2344 (2000, front-drive version of 2335)
  - Moskvitch 2901 (1994, van version of 2141)
  - Moskvitch 2141 Moskvitch Sviatogor (1997) (a name taken from Russian mythology)
- Moskvitch 2142 (1997–2003)
  - Moskvitch 2142 Dolgorukiy (1997) (named after Yuri Dolgorukiy, founder of Moscow)
  - Moskvitch 2142 Kalita (1998) (named after Ivan Kalita, a 14th-century Russian prince)
  - Moskvitch 2142 Kniaz Vladimir (1998) (named after Prince Vladimir)
  - Moskvitch 2142 Duet (1999)

=== Fifth (2022–present) ===
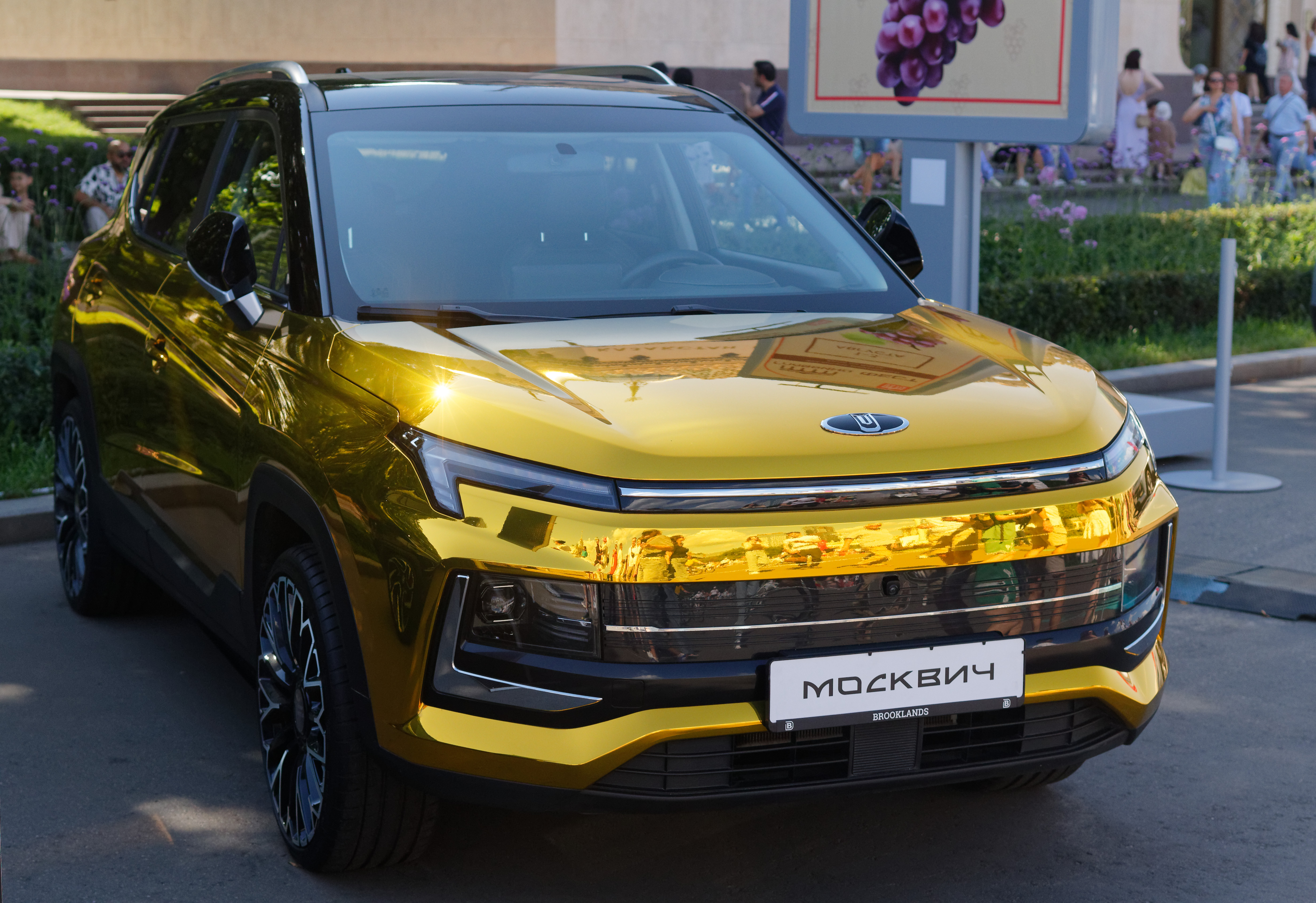
Moskvitch 3

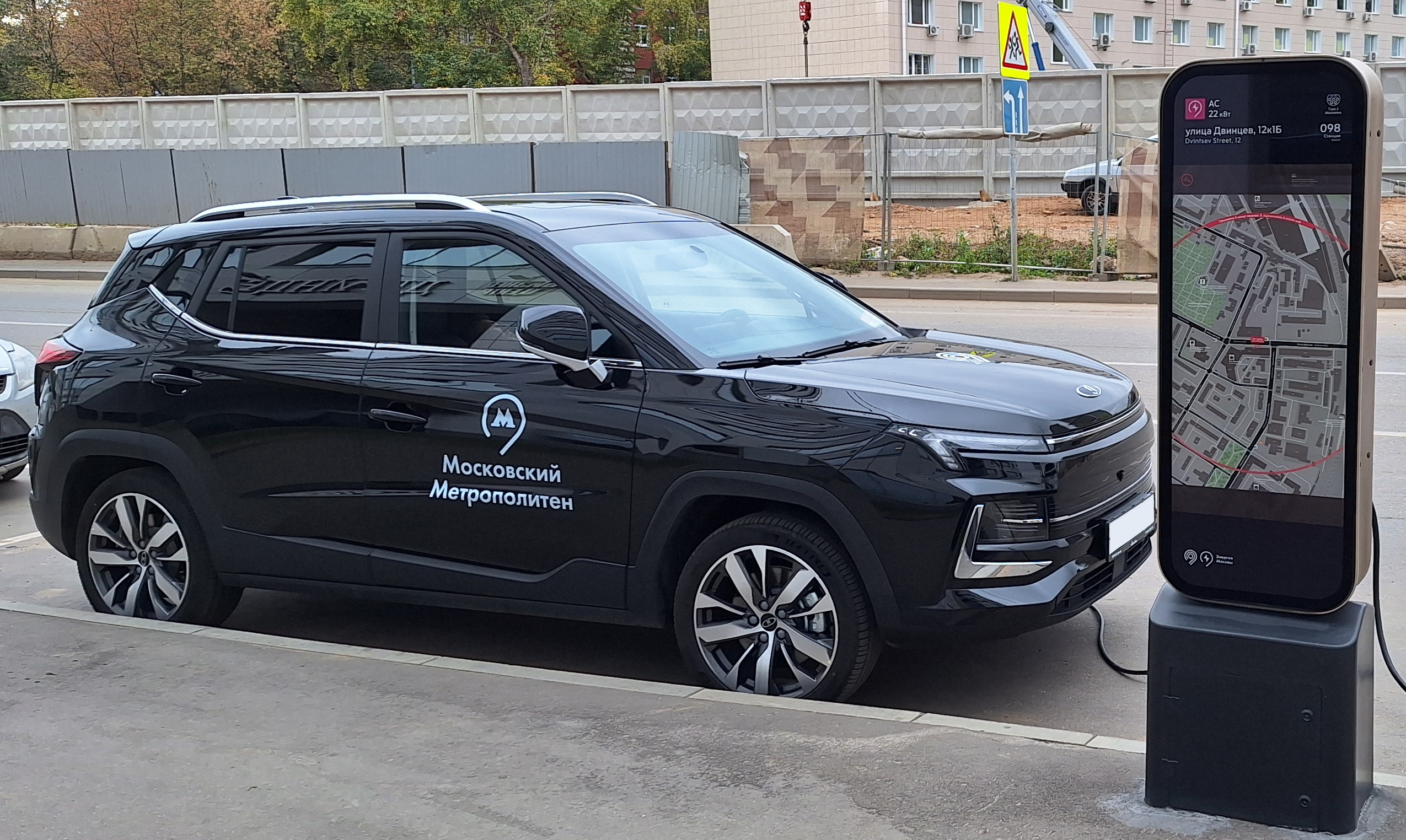
Moskvitch 3e

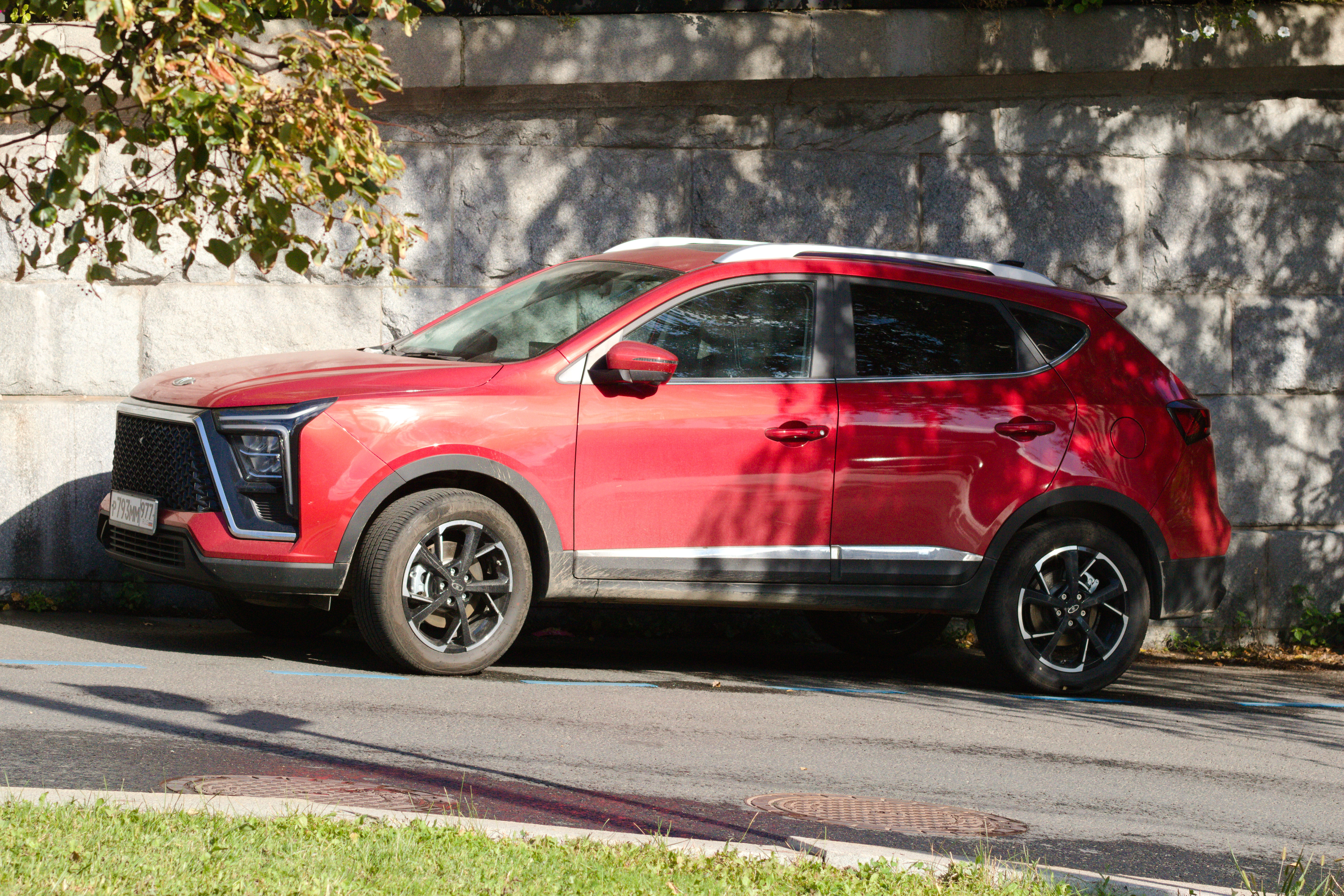
Moskvitch 5

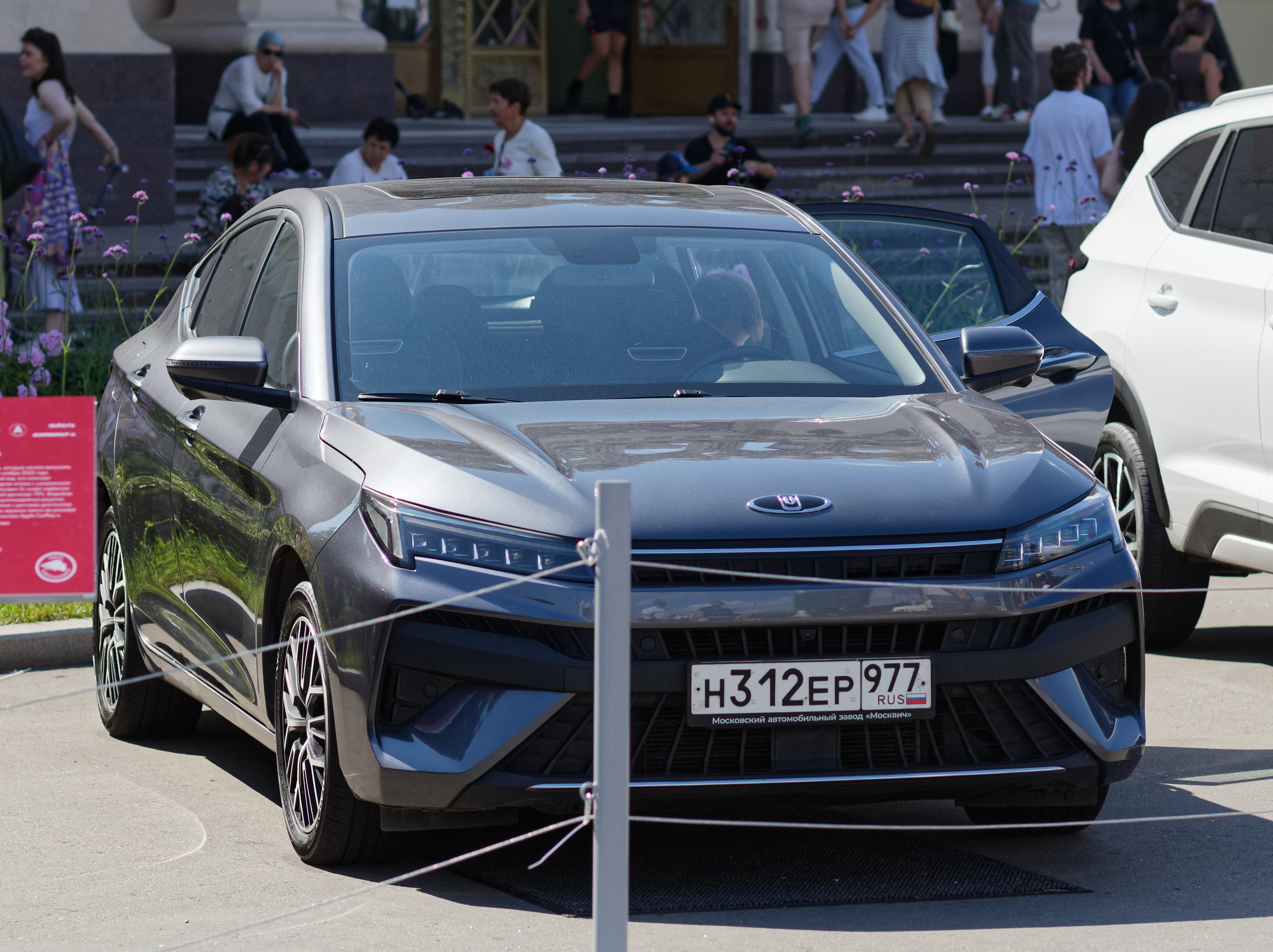
Moskvitch 6

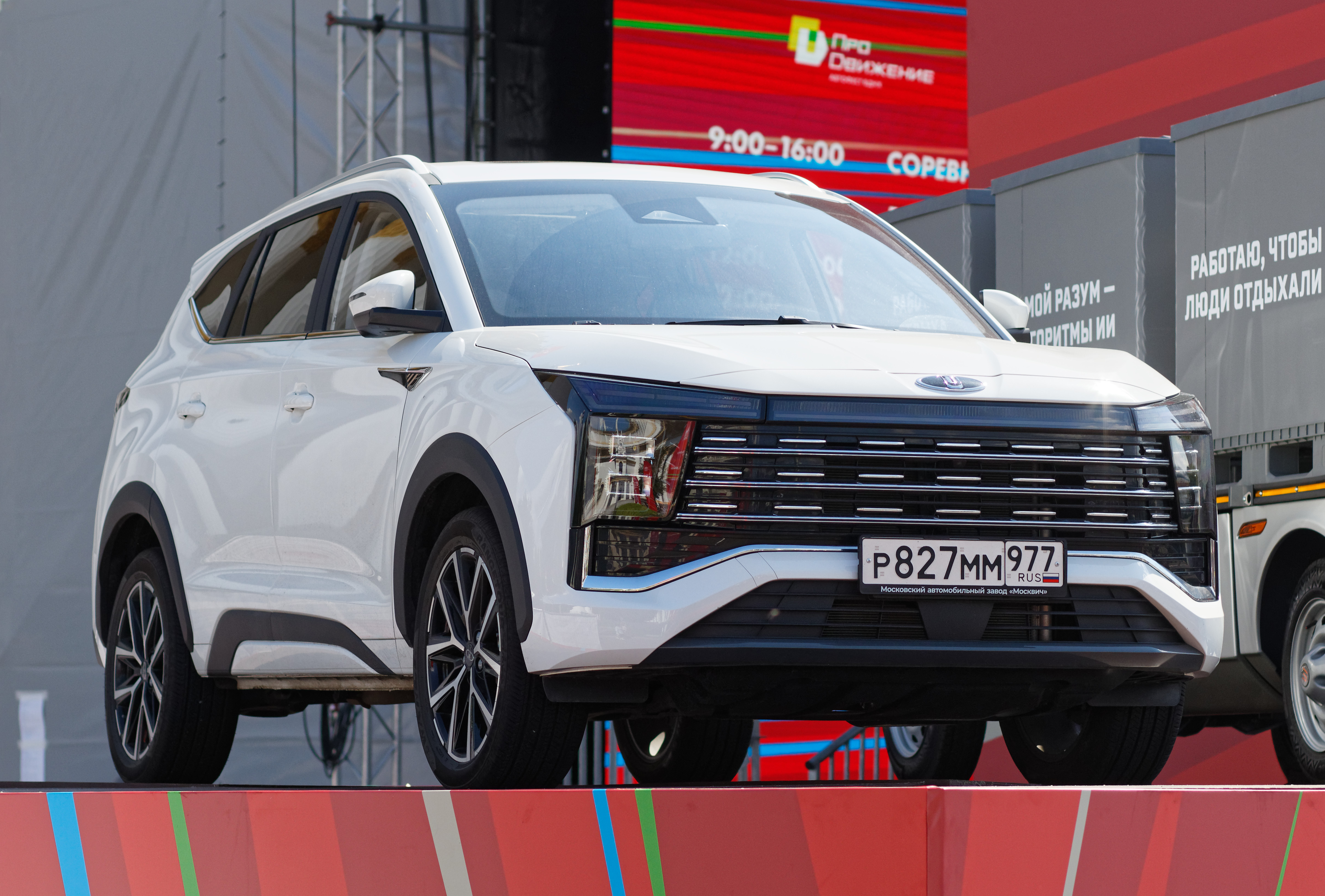
Moskvitch 8
- Moskvitch 3 (2022–present)
  - Moskvitch 3e (2022–present)
  - Moskvitch 3 Comfort (2023–present)
- Moskvitch 5 (2023–2026)
- Moskvitch 6 (2023–present)
- Moskvitch 8 (2023–present)

=== Sixth (2026–present) ===
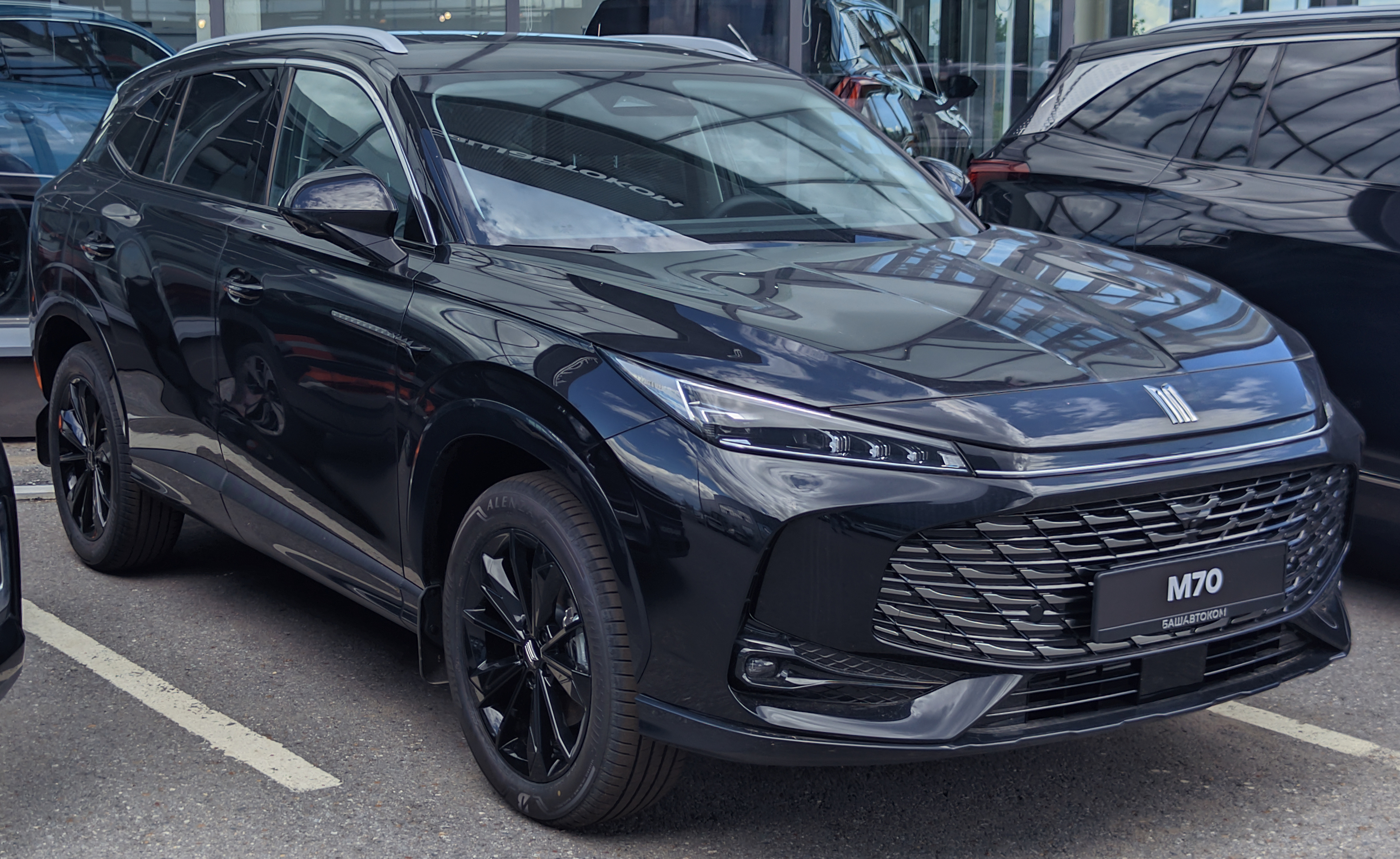
Moskvitch M70

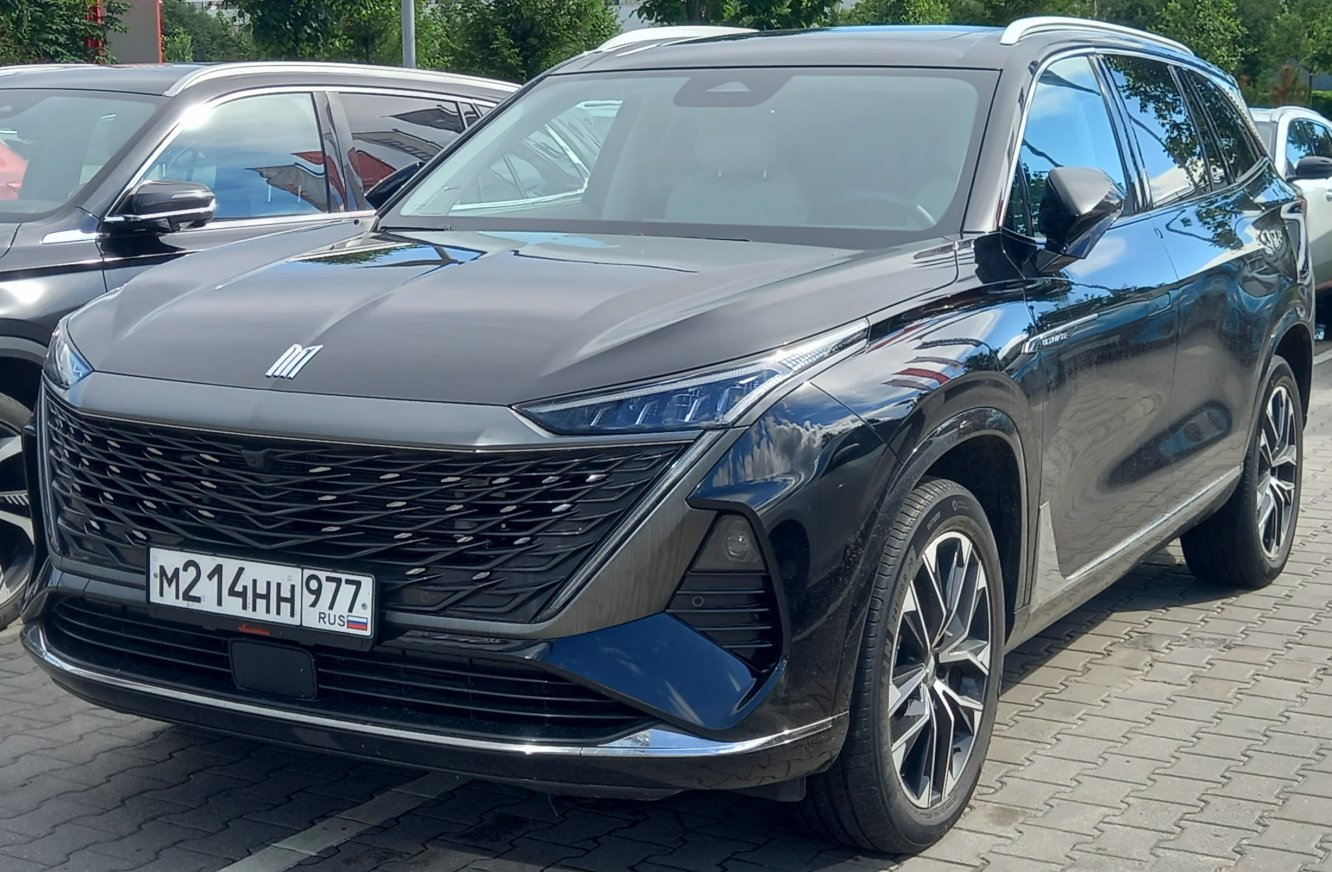
Moskvitch M90
- Moskvitch M70 (2026–present)
- Moskvitch M90 (2026–present)

=== Sport and racing cars ===
- Moskvitch 404 Sport (1950s)
- Moskvitch 409 (1962)
- Moskvitch 412R (1972)
- Moskvitch 2141KR (1988)
- Moskvitch G1 (1955)
- Moskvitch G2 (1956)
- Moskvitch G3 (1961)
- Moskvitch G4 (1963)
- Moskvitch G5 (1965)

=== Prototypes ===
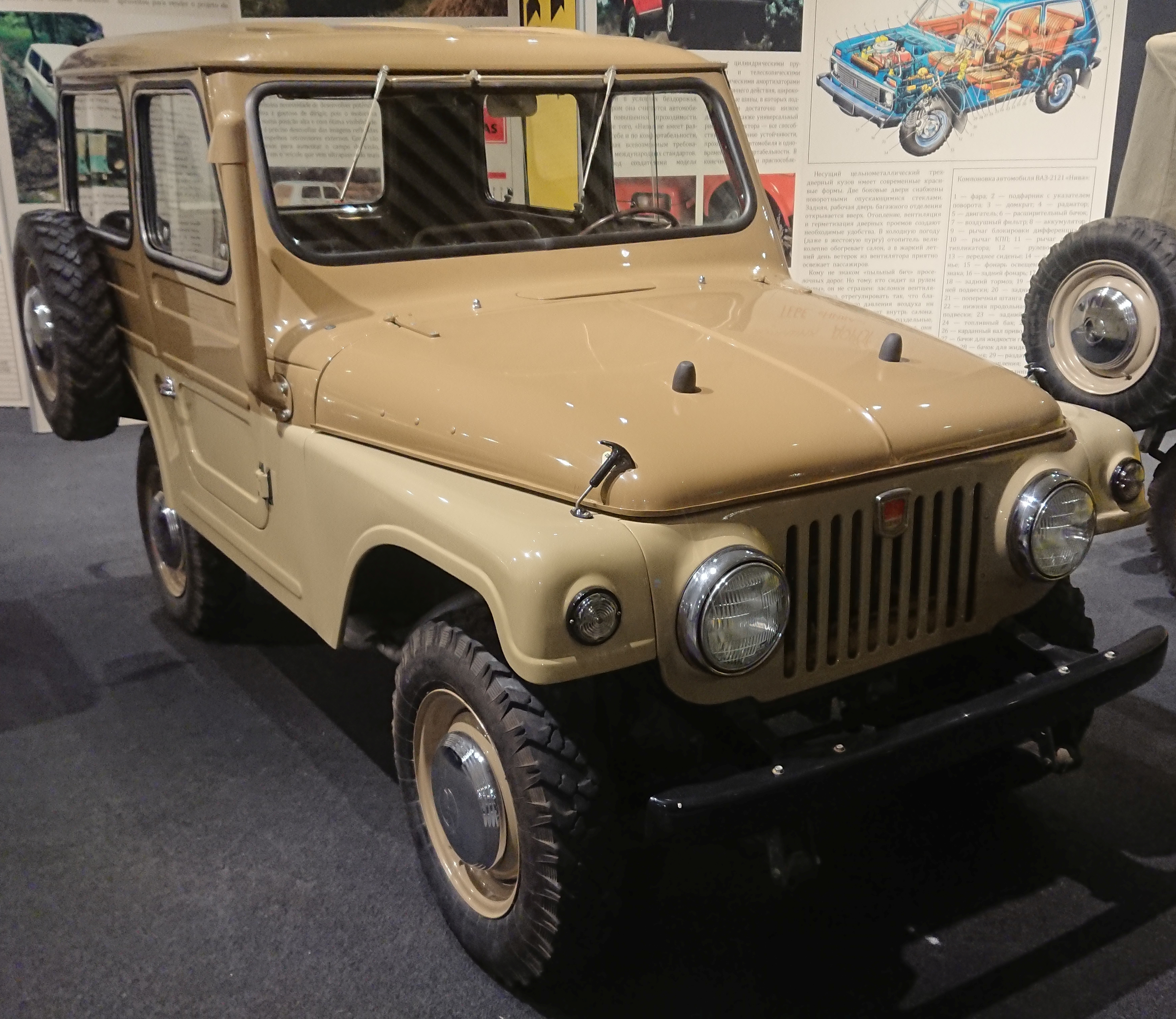
Moskvitch 416 (1960)

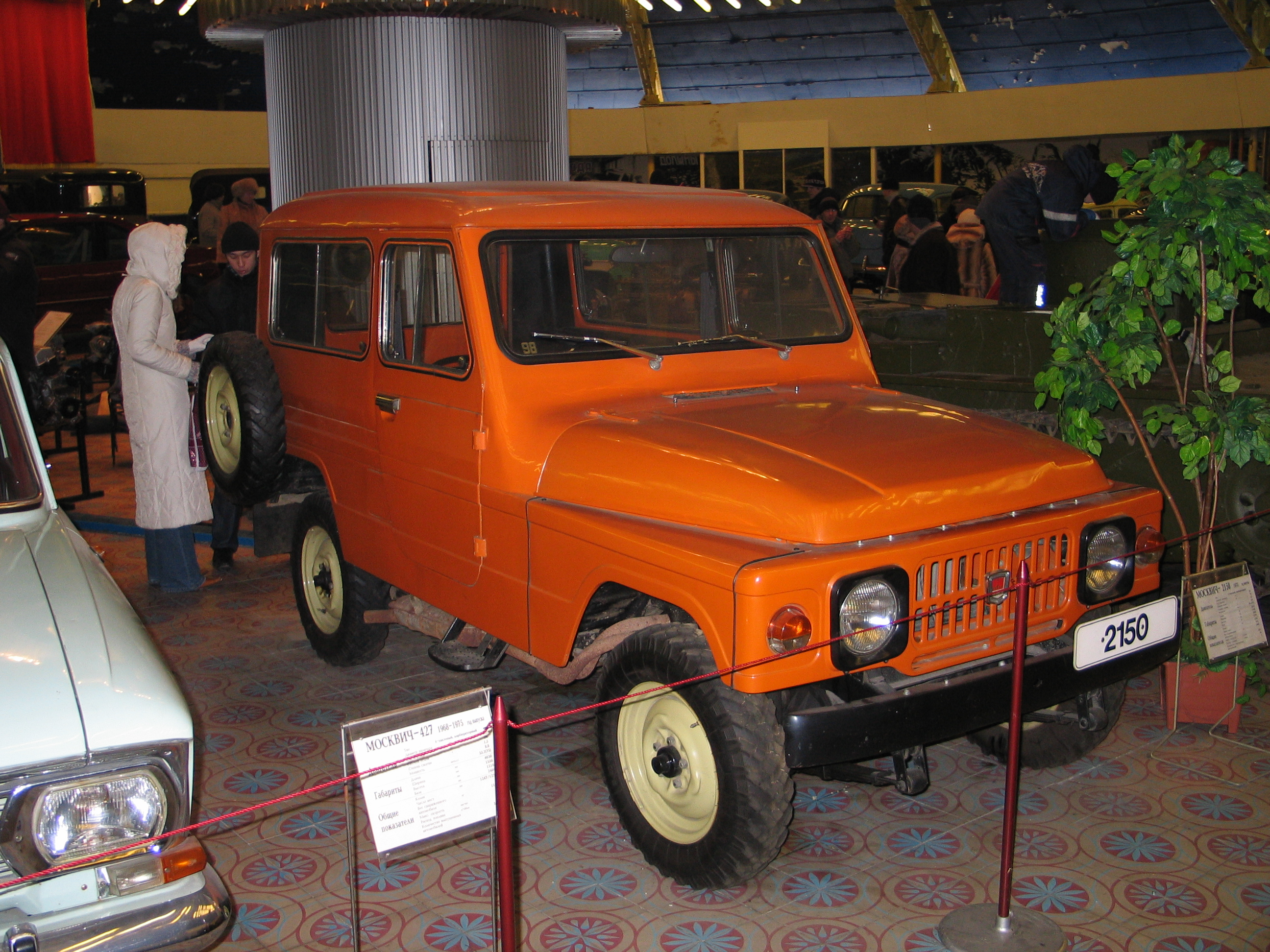
Moskvitch 2150 (1973)

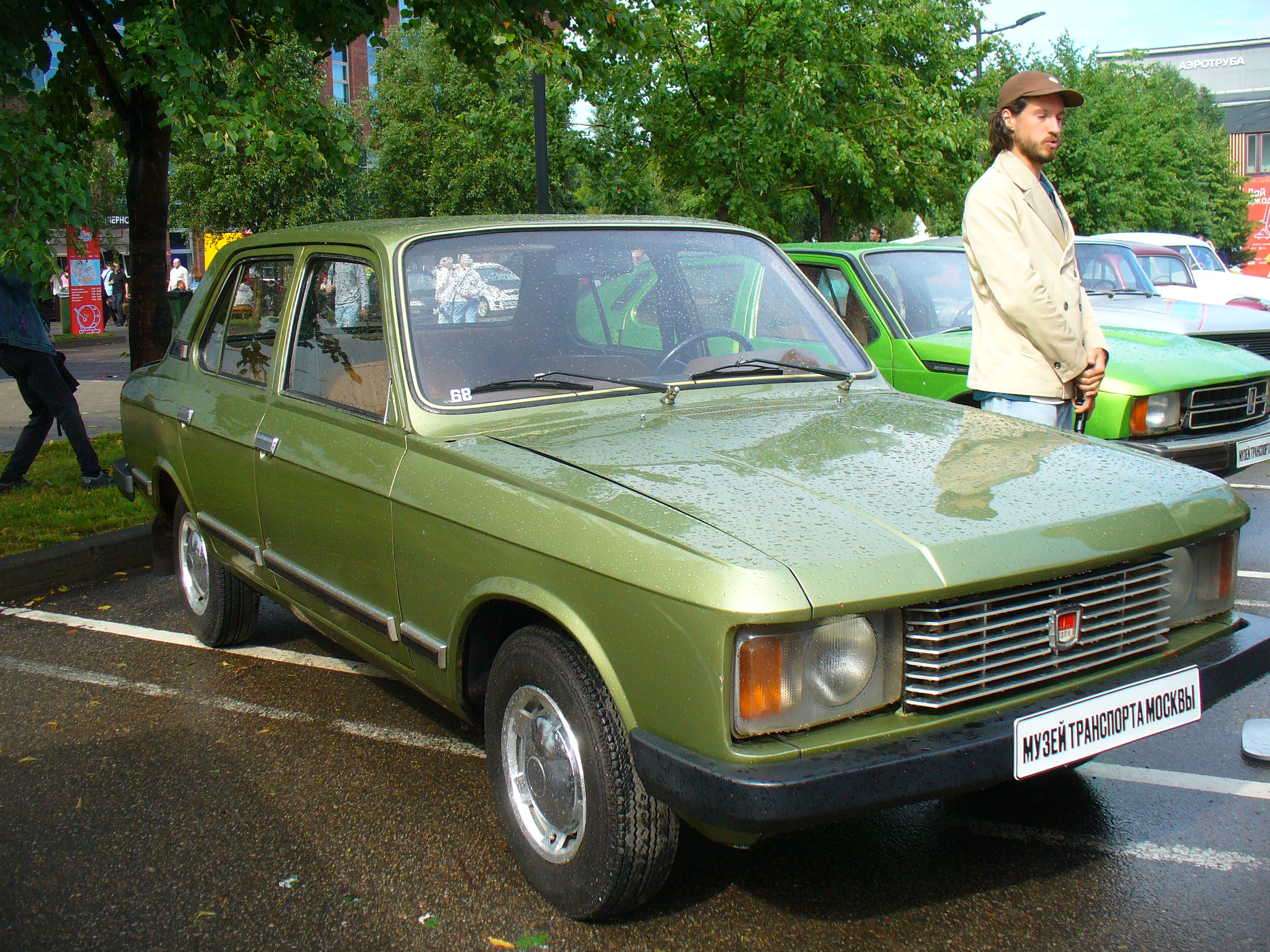
Moskvitch 3·5·6 (1975)

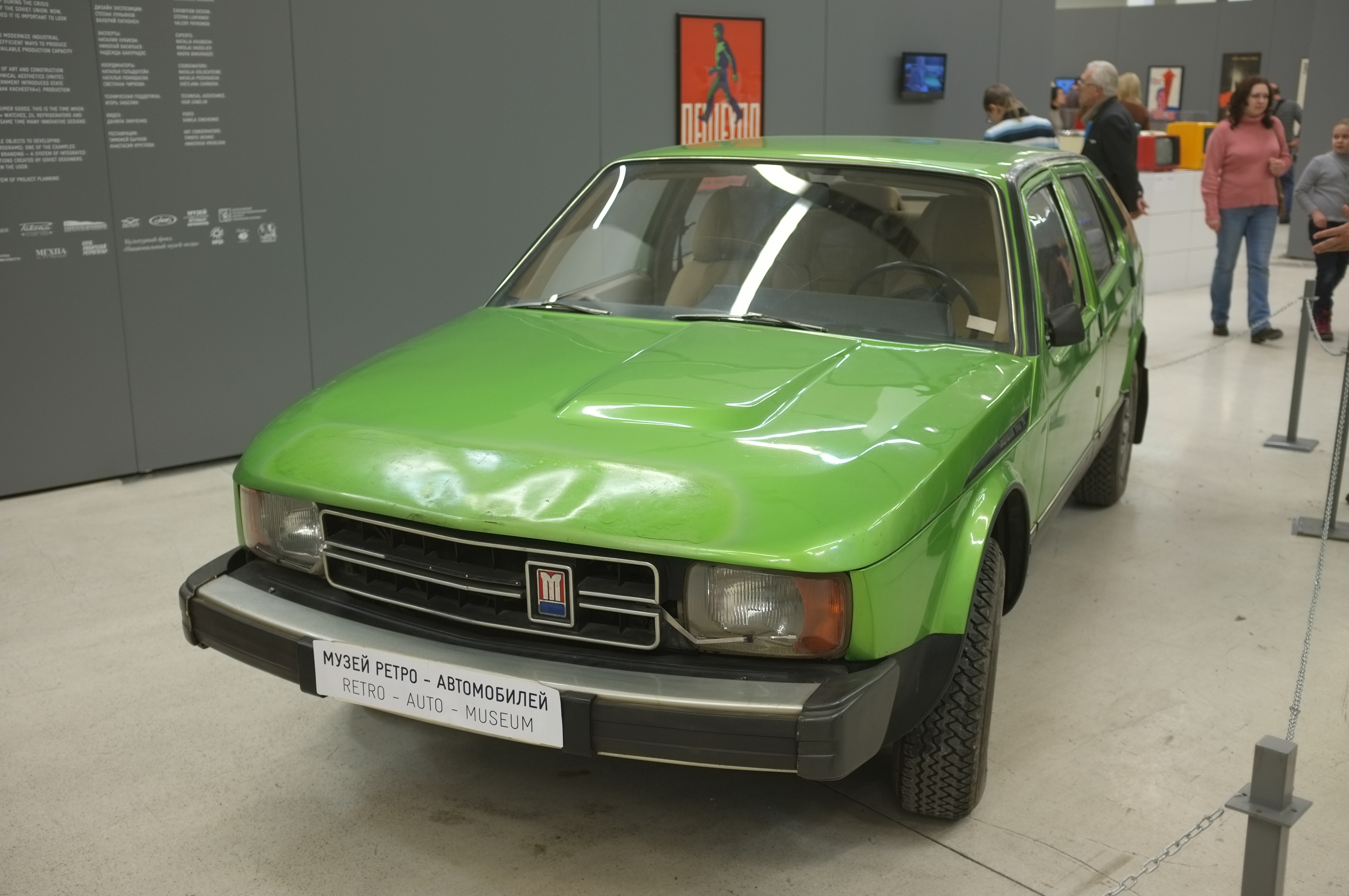
Moskvitch S1 (1975)

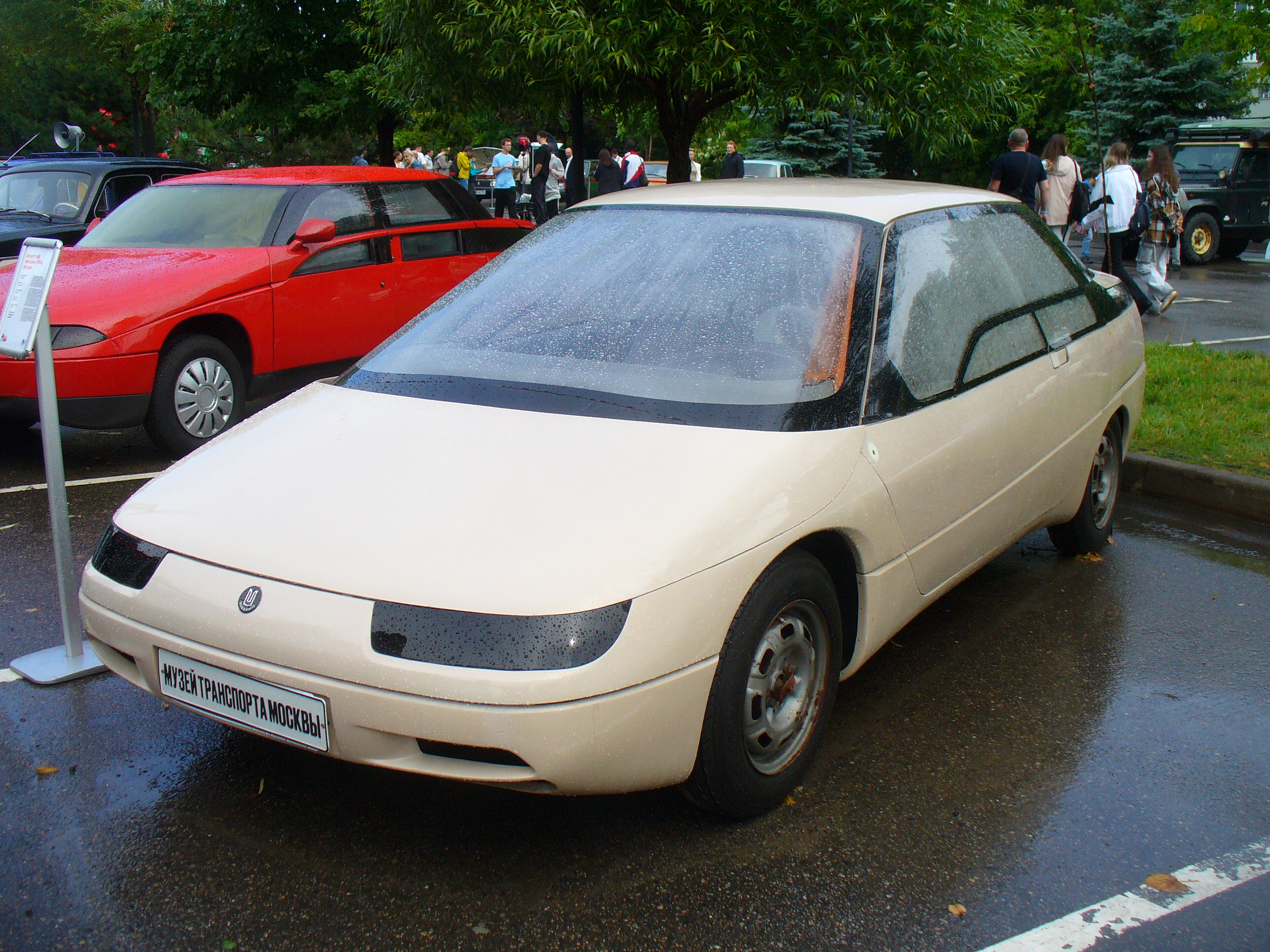
Moskvitch 2144 Istra (1985)
- Moskvitch 444 (1956–1958, later built as the ZAZ-965)
- Moskvitch A9 (1957, development moved to RAF)
- Moskvitch 4x4 (1958)
- Moskvitch 415 (1959)
  - Moskvitch 415S (1966, improved 415)
- Moskvitch 416 (1958–1959, hardtop version of 415)
- Moskvitch 408 Tourist (1964, prototype 4-seat convertible based on 408)
- Moskvitch PT (1964–1965, prototype minibus taxi)
- Moskvitch 2148 (1973)
- Moskvitch 2150 (1973)
- 3·5 Series
  - Moskvitch 3·5·2 (1970, based on the M-408)
  - Moskvitch 3·5·3 (station wagon version of 3·5·2)
  - Moskvitch 3·5·4 (modernized 3·5·2)
  - Moskvitch 3·5·5 (1972, based on the 3·5·2)
  - Moskvitch 3·5·6 (1975)
- C Series
  - Moskvitch Delta
  - Moskvitch S1 (1975)
  - Moskvitch S2 (developed from the S1)
  - Moskvitch S3 (1976)
  - Moskvitch S4
- Moskvitch 434G (1978–1979, prototype pickup truck based on 412)
- Moskvitch 2144 Istra (1985)
- Moskvitch 8135 (1989, prototype trailer)
- Moskvitch 2143 Yauza (1991)
- Moskvitch X1

== Gallery ==
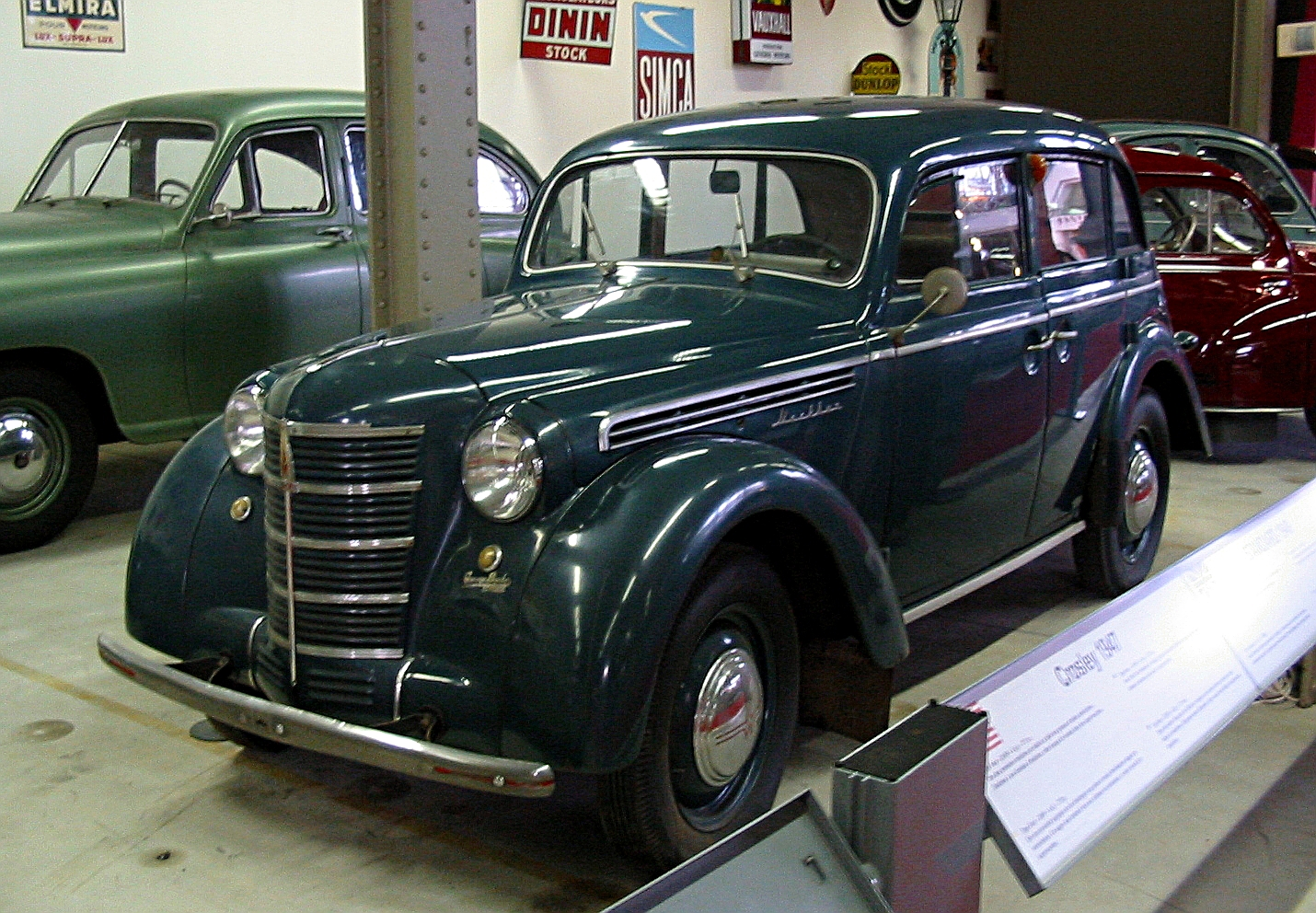
Moskvitch 400

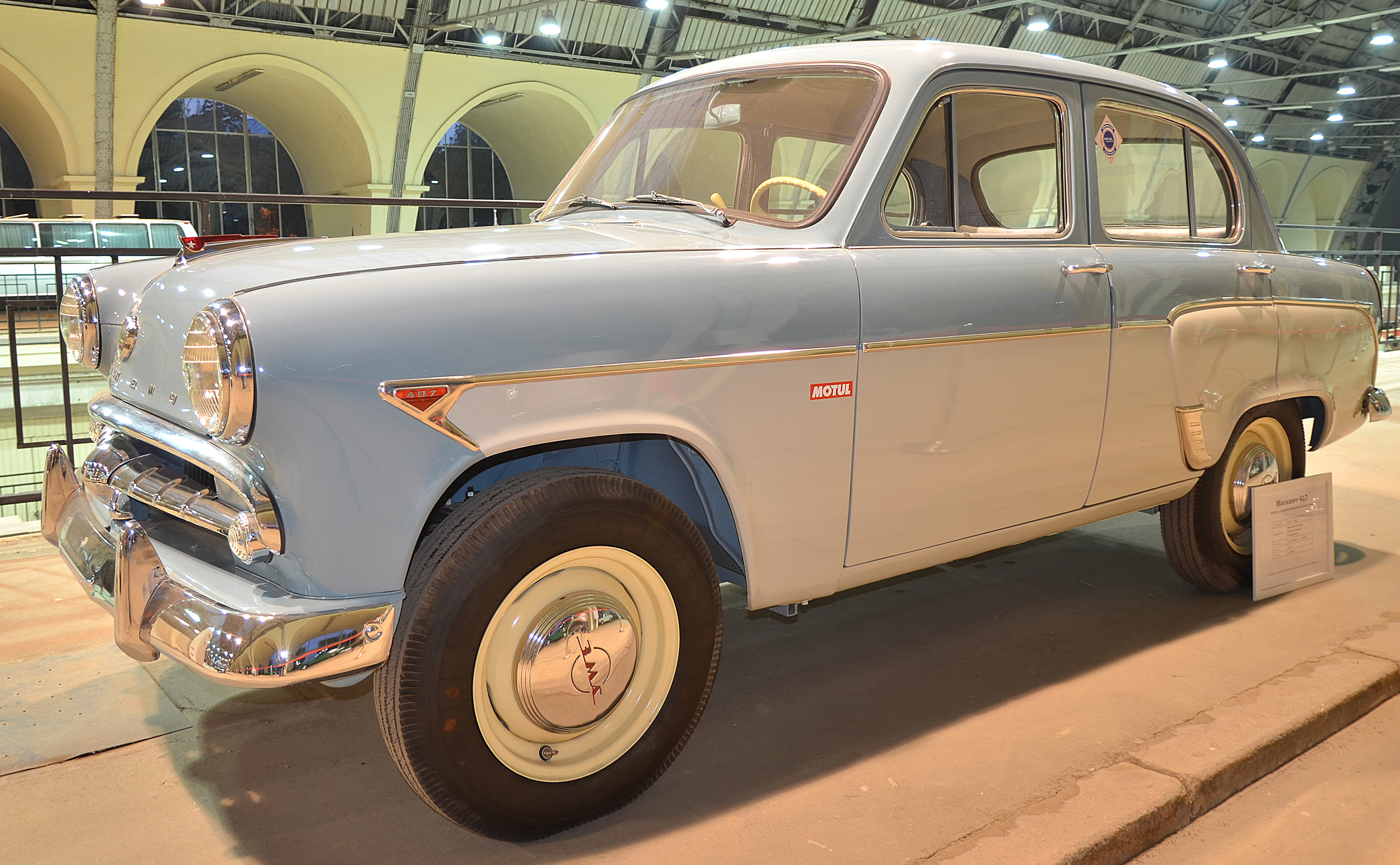
Moskvitch 402

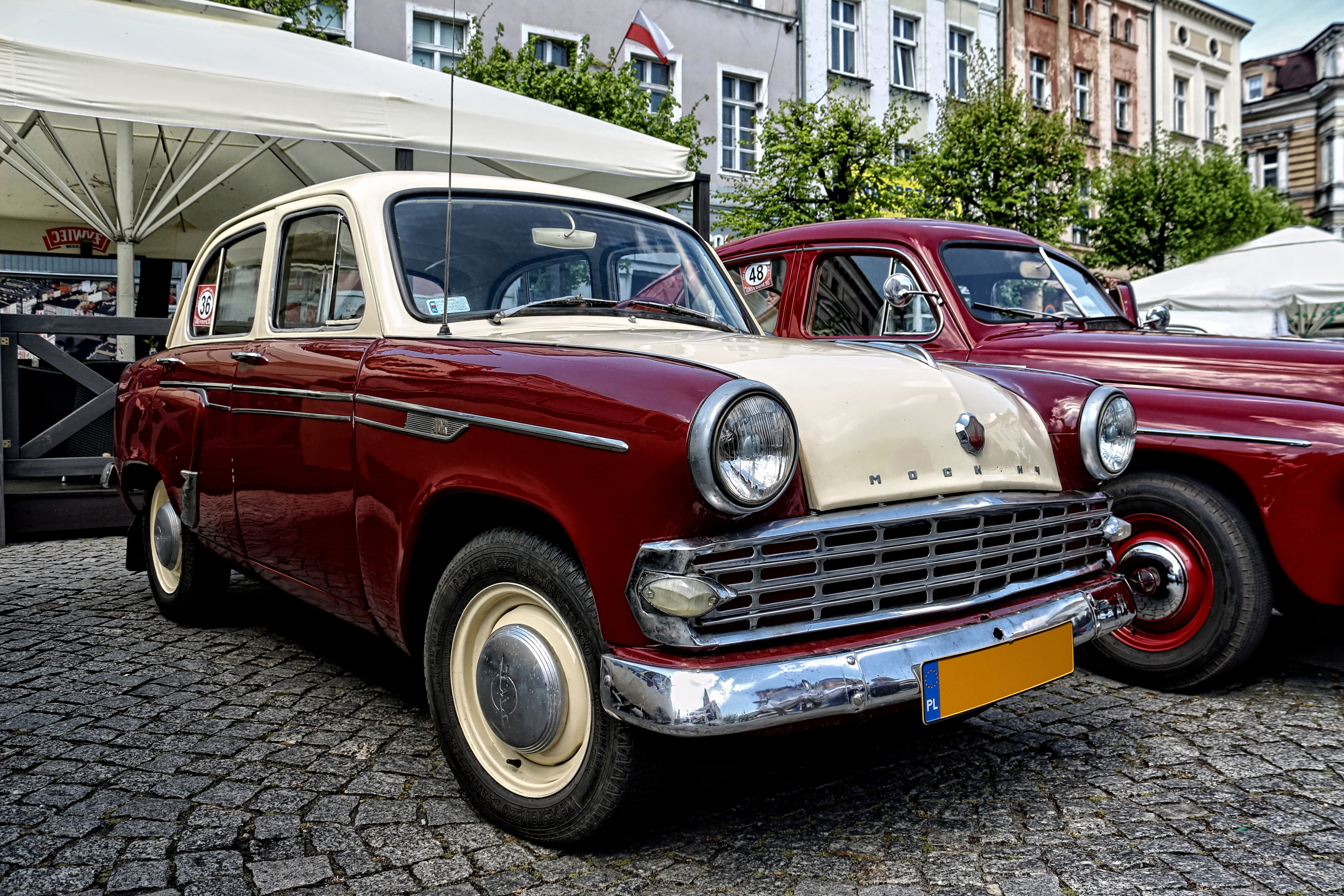
Moskvitch 403

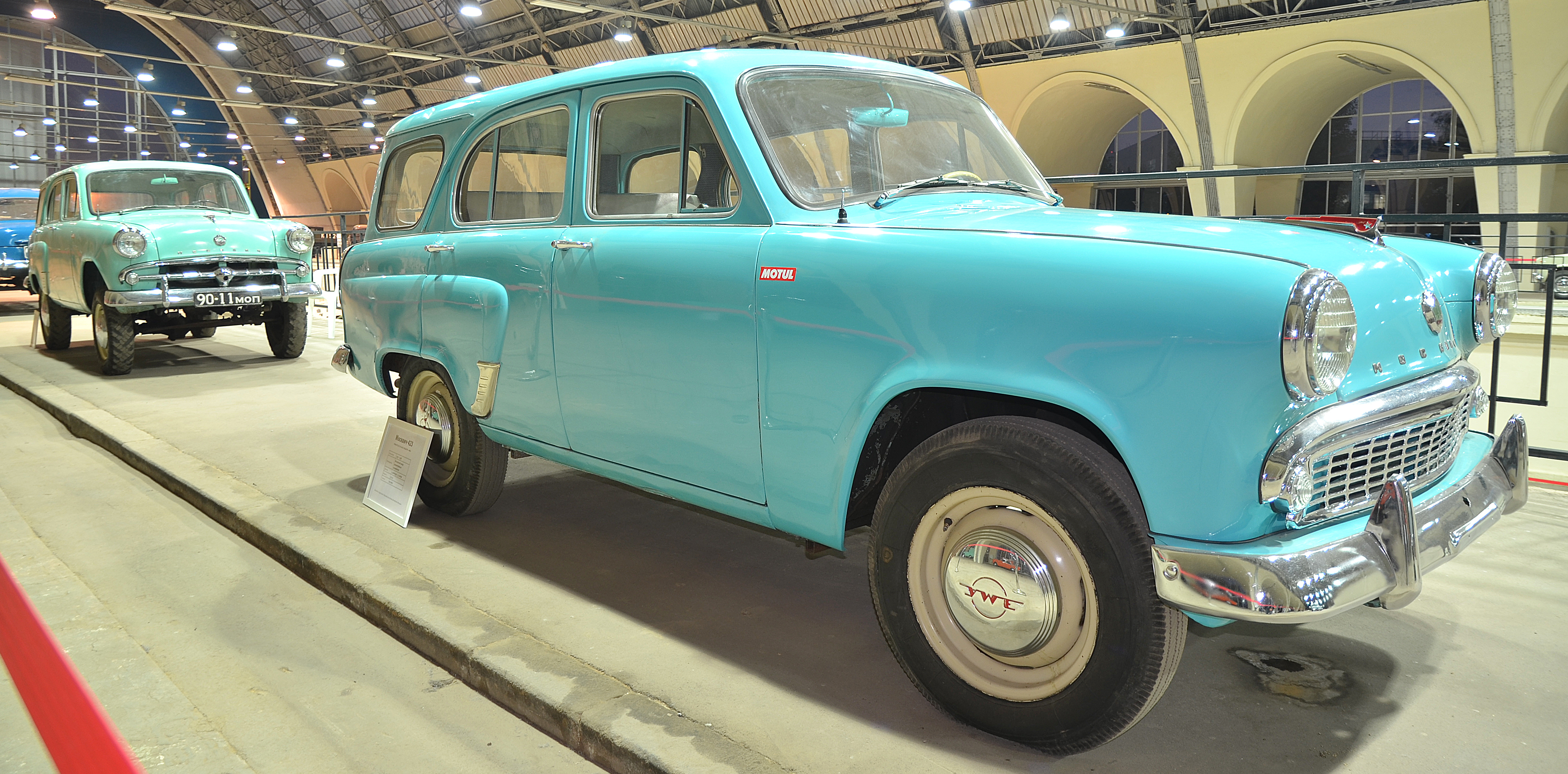
Moskvitch 423

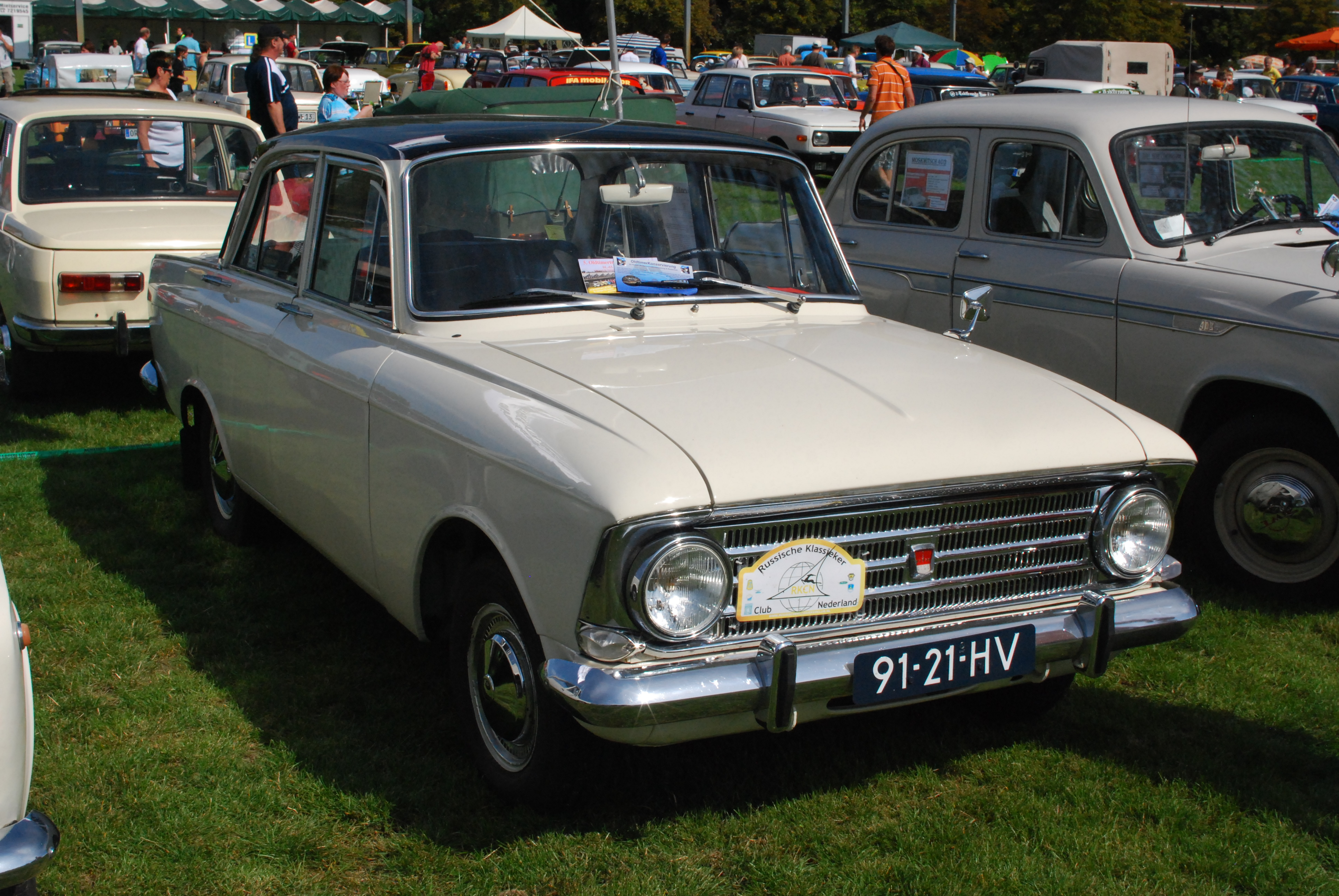
Moskvitch 408

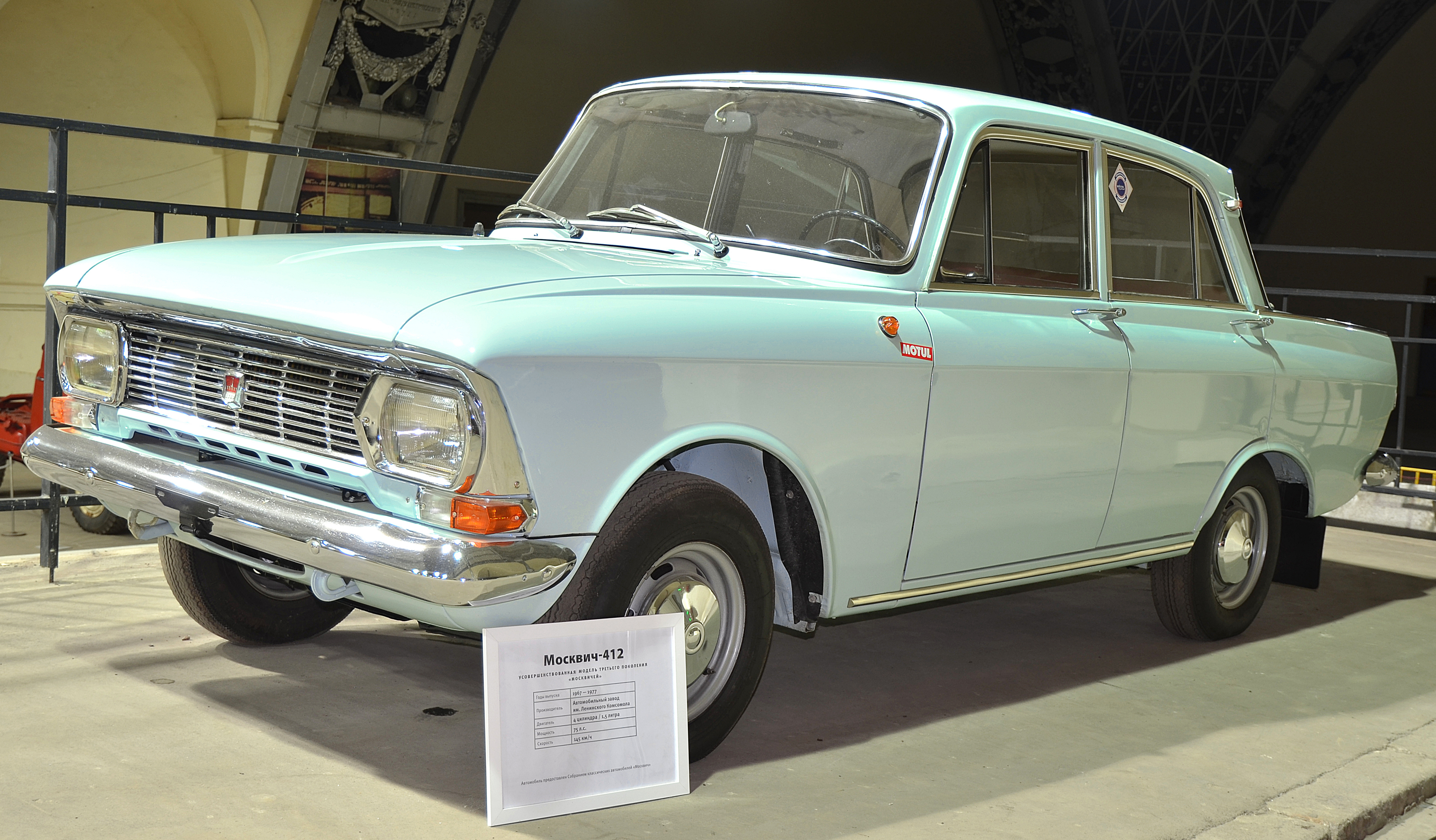
Moskvitch 412

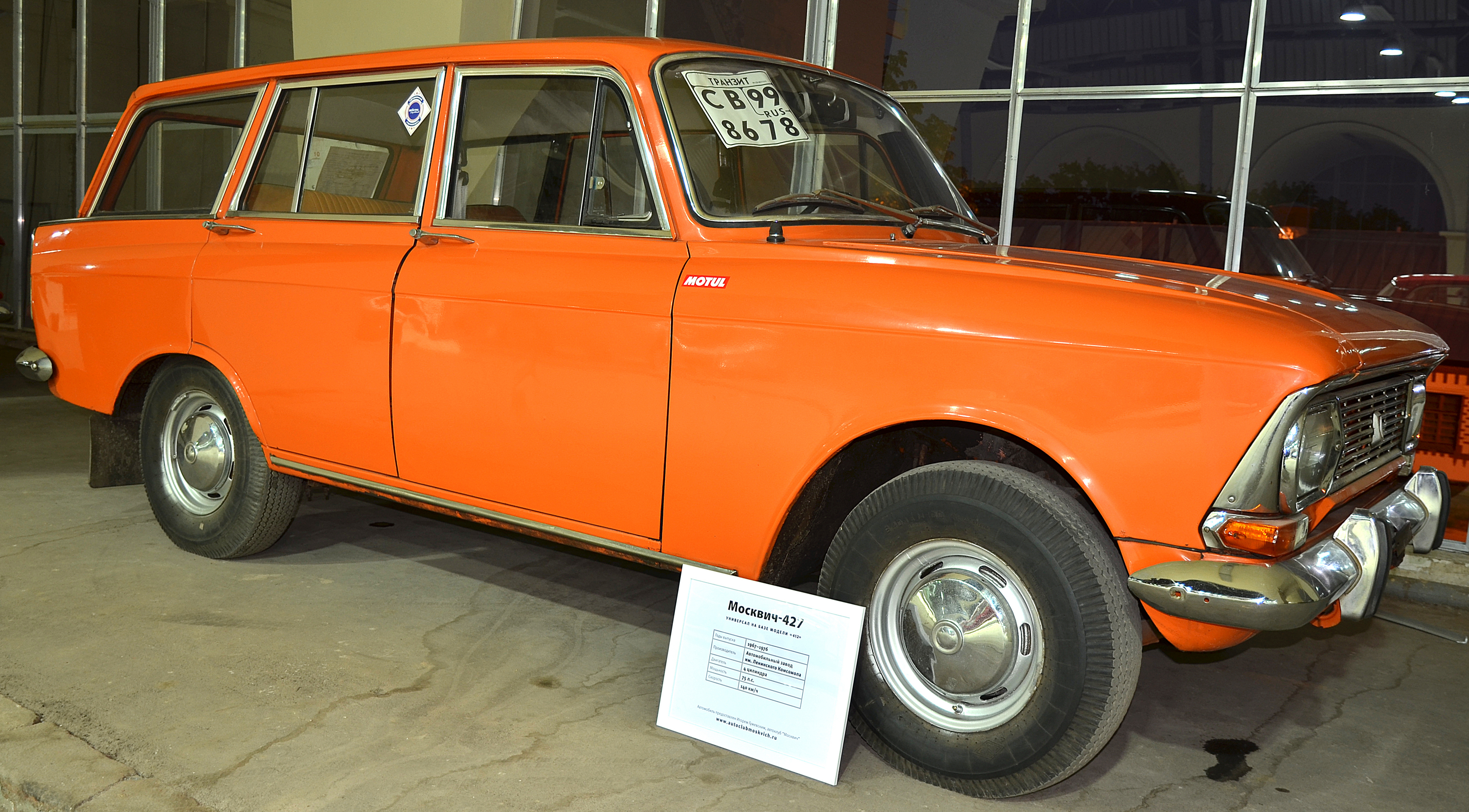
1972 Moskvitch-427 estate (this year of this export model sold as a Moskvitch 1500)

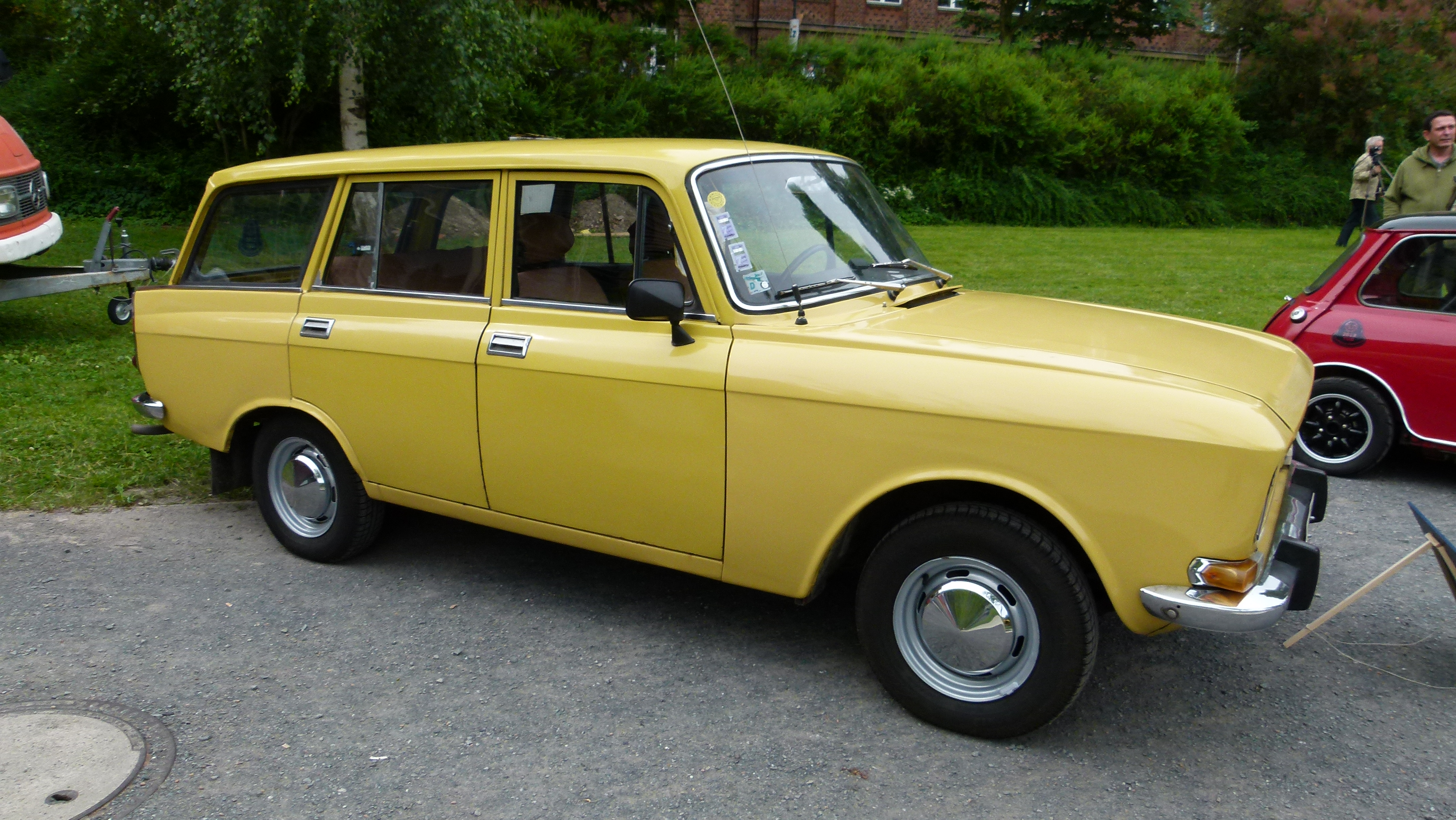
Moskvitch 2137

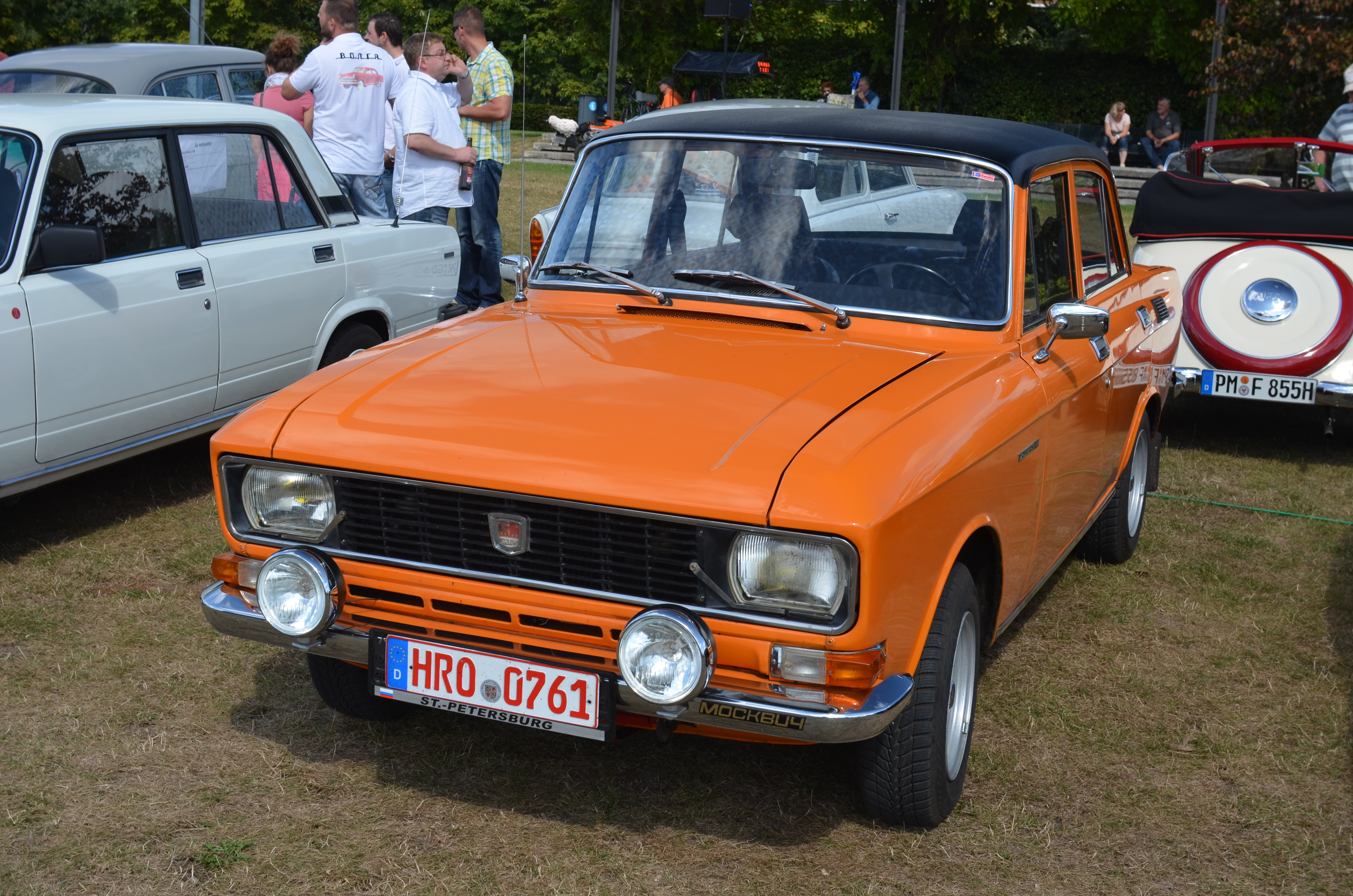
Moskvitch 2140

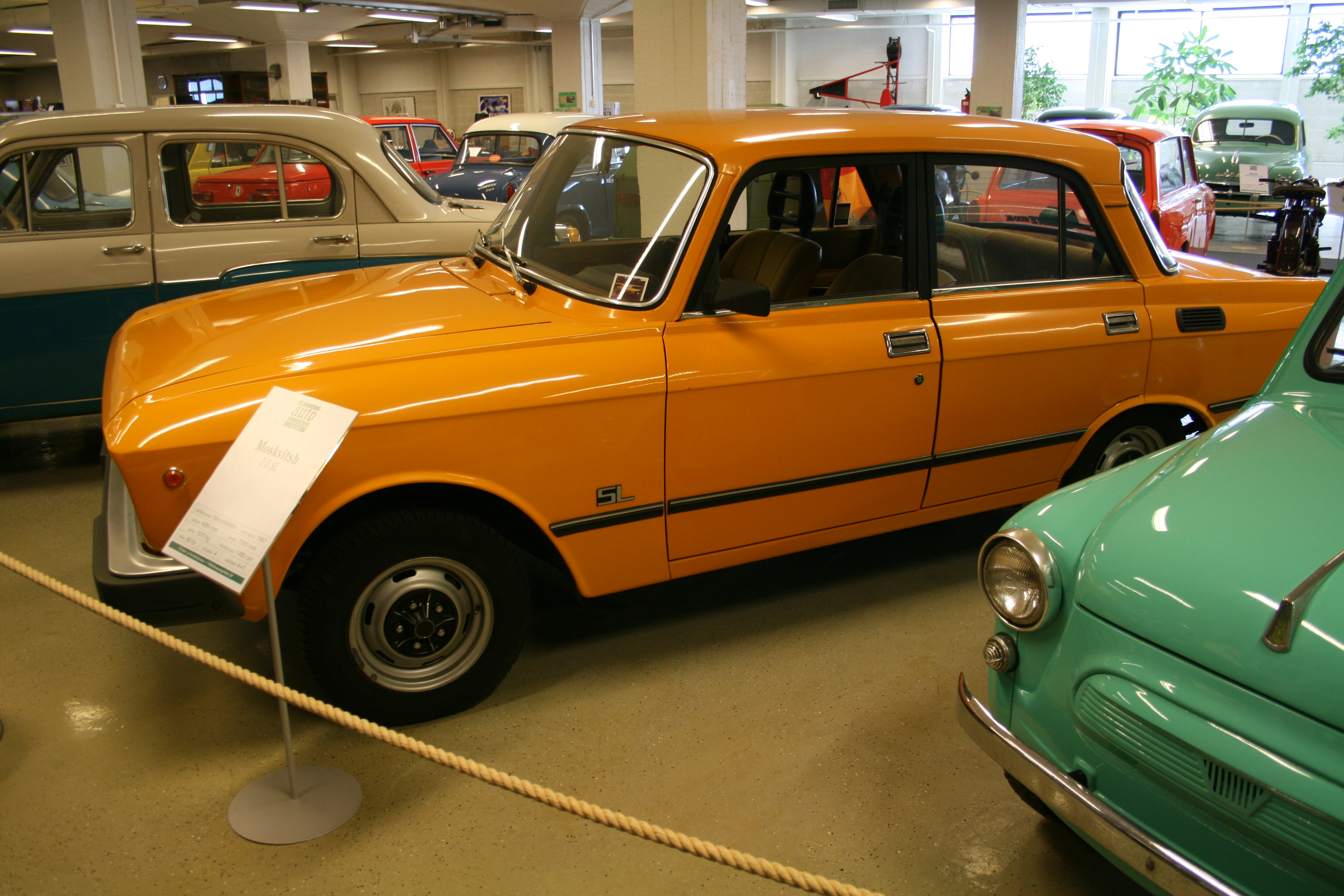
Moskvitch 1.5 SL (export name for 2140SL)

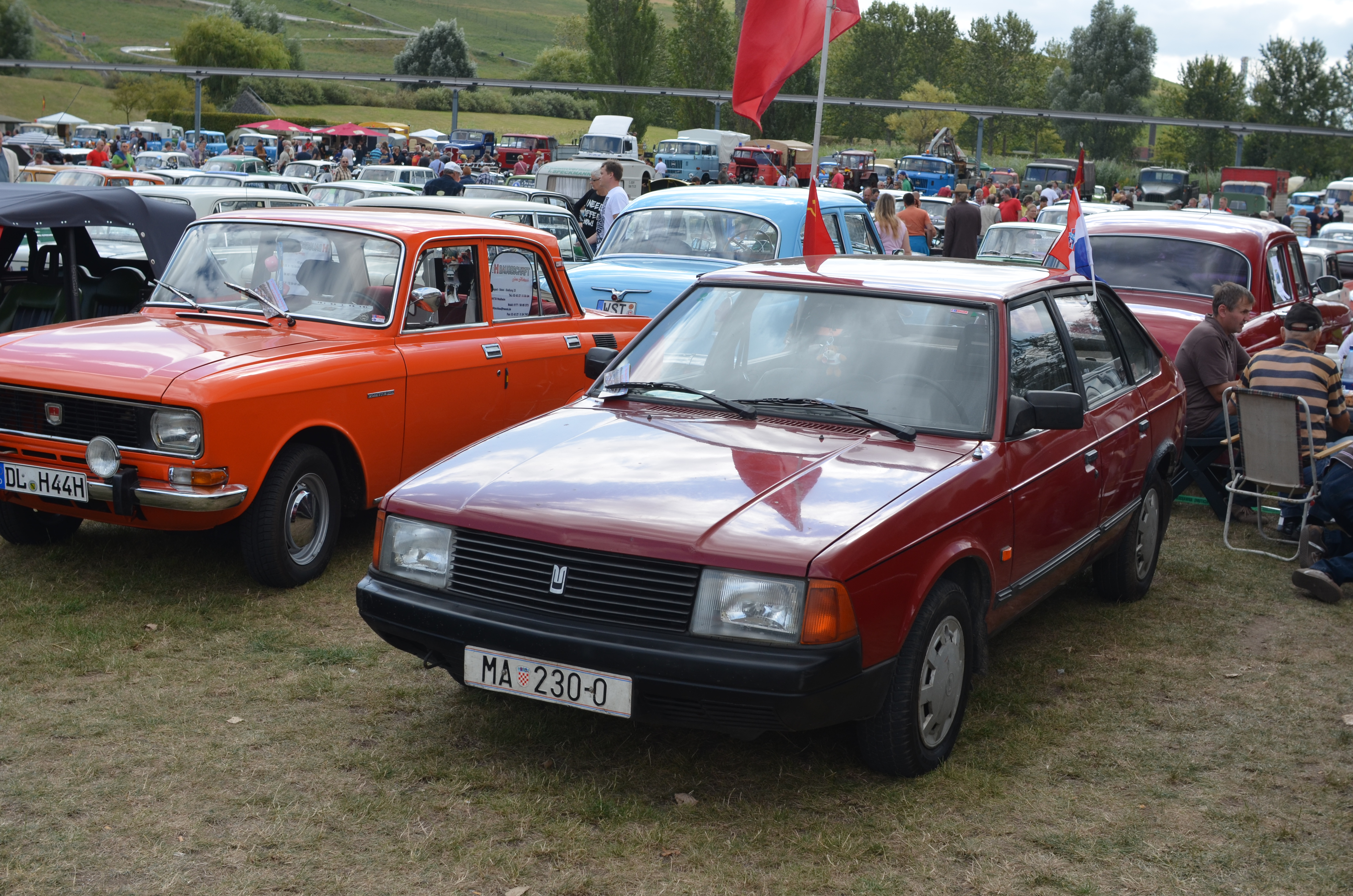
M-2141 alias M-2141S

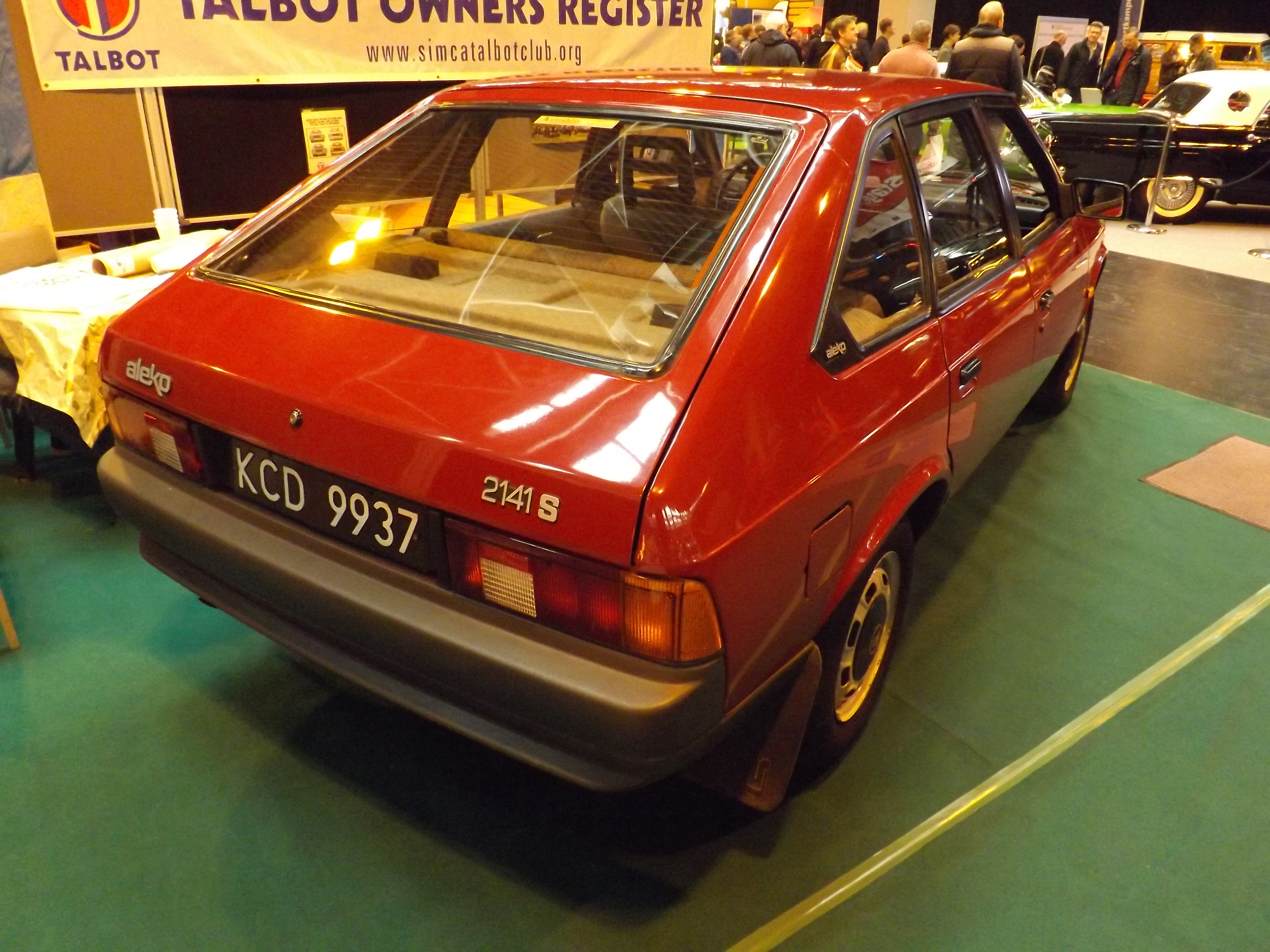
M-21412 alias M-2141S
