= Moskvitch G2 =

Overview
- Manufacturer: Moskvitch
- Production: 1956

Body and chassis
- Class: Sports car
- Layout: RR layout

Powertrain
- Engine: 1,074 cc (65.5 cu in) I4 (1956-1959); 1.3L OHV I4 (1959-1963)

Chronology
- Predecessor: Moskvitch G1
- Successor: Moskvitch G3

The Moskvitch G2 was a sports car from Moskvitch based on the earlier Moskvitch G1. Instead of an open wheel car it was now fitted with an aerodynamic body (spider or hard-top) and was capable of a top speed of 223 km/h (139 mph). It was powered by a mid-mounted 70 hp (52 kW) 1,074 cc (65.5 cu in) inline 4-cylinder flathead engine derived from the 407-series engine used in the 407. To The total weight was 660 kg (1,455 lb). A 120 L (32 US gal; 26 imp gal) fuel tank was mounted next to the driver, toward the front of the car. The brakes, suspension, and wheels were borrowed from the Moskvitch 401. Top speed was 139 mph (224 km/h).

The G2 broke several speed records in the USSR in 1956. In 1959, the engine was replaced with a unit based on the engine from the Moskvitch 407 and a rollbar was installed above the driver's seat. The G2 was decommissioned in late 1963.

== Sources ==
- Thompson, Andy. Cars of the Soviet Union. Somerset, UK: Haynes Publishing, 2008.
