= Moskvitch G1 =

Overview
- Manufacturer: Moskvitch
- Production: 1955

Body and chassis
- Class: Racing car
- Layout: RR layout
- Related: Moskvitch 404 Sport

Powertrain
- Engine: 1.1L MZMA-405 I4 (1955-1959); 1.3L MZMA-407 I4 (1959-1963)

Dimensions
- Curb weight: 670 kg (1,477 lb)

Chronology
- Successor: Moskvitch G2

Moskvitch G1 was a sports car from Moskvitch produced in 1955 by the engineer I. Gladilin. It was the first Moskvitch specially developed for racing. It had aluminium coachwork and was powered by an 1,074 cc (65.5 cu in) inline 4-cylinder flathead engine giving 70 hp (52 kW) and a top speed of 190 km/h (118 mph). The engine was derived from the 407-series engine used in the 407. To increase the power it was fitted with four carburettors from the motorcycle Izh-49. Due to a lack of funds, the brakes, suspension, and wheels were borrowed from the Moskvitch 401.

In 1956, the body was changed to a type with enclosed wheels and engine, becoming the G2. This body was changed back to open-wheel in 1960. The engine was replaced with one based on the engine in the newer Moskvitch 407 in 1959; like the 405 engine, the 407 engine was equipped with four carburetors. The suspension was revised in 1960, also borrowed from the 407. The G1 raced in its final configuration until 1963, after which it was scrapped. The G1 would be the basis for later racing cars such as the Moskvitch G2.
