= Moskvitch 404 Sport =

- Designer(s): Igor A. Gladilin

Technical specifications
- Length: 4,130 millimetres (163 in)
- Width: 1,375 millimetres (54.1 in)
- Height: 1,015 millimetres (40.0 in)
- Axle track: 1,168 millimetres (46.0 in) (Front and Rear)
- Wheelbase: 2,340 millimetres (92 in)
- Engine: Moskvich 404 (1955-1959); Moskvich 407 (1959-1962) 1,068–1,298 cubic centimetres (65.2–79.2 cu in; 1.068–1.298 L) Inline 4 Longitudinally Mounted
- Transmission: 3 and 4-speed Manual
- Power: 58–70 horsepower (59–71 PS; 43–52 kW) @ 4,800-4,860 rpm 85–100 newton-metres (63–74 lbf⋅ft)
- Weight: 902 kilograms (1,989 lb)

Competition history
Entries	Races	Wins	Podiums
80	79	22	36
Poles	Titles		
10	3		

The Moskvitch 404 Sport was a prototype sports car from Soviet manufacturer Moskvitch introduced in 1954.

It was based on the Moskvitch 400/420 and used a new, experimental overhead valve hemi engine, with a compression ratio of 9.2:1, which produced 58 hp (43 kW; 59 PS). Fitted with four sidedraft carburettors, the 404's top speed was 91 mph (146 km/h). The car was quite successful in racing and won three Soviet Championships.
