= Moskvitch 2142 =

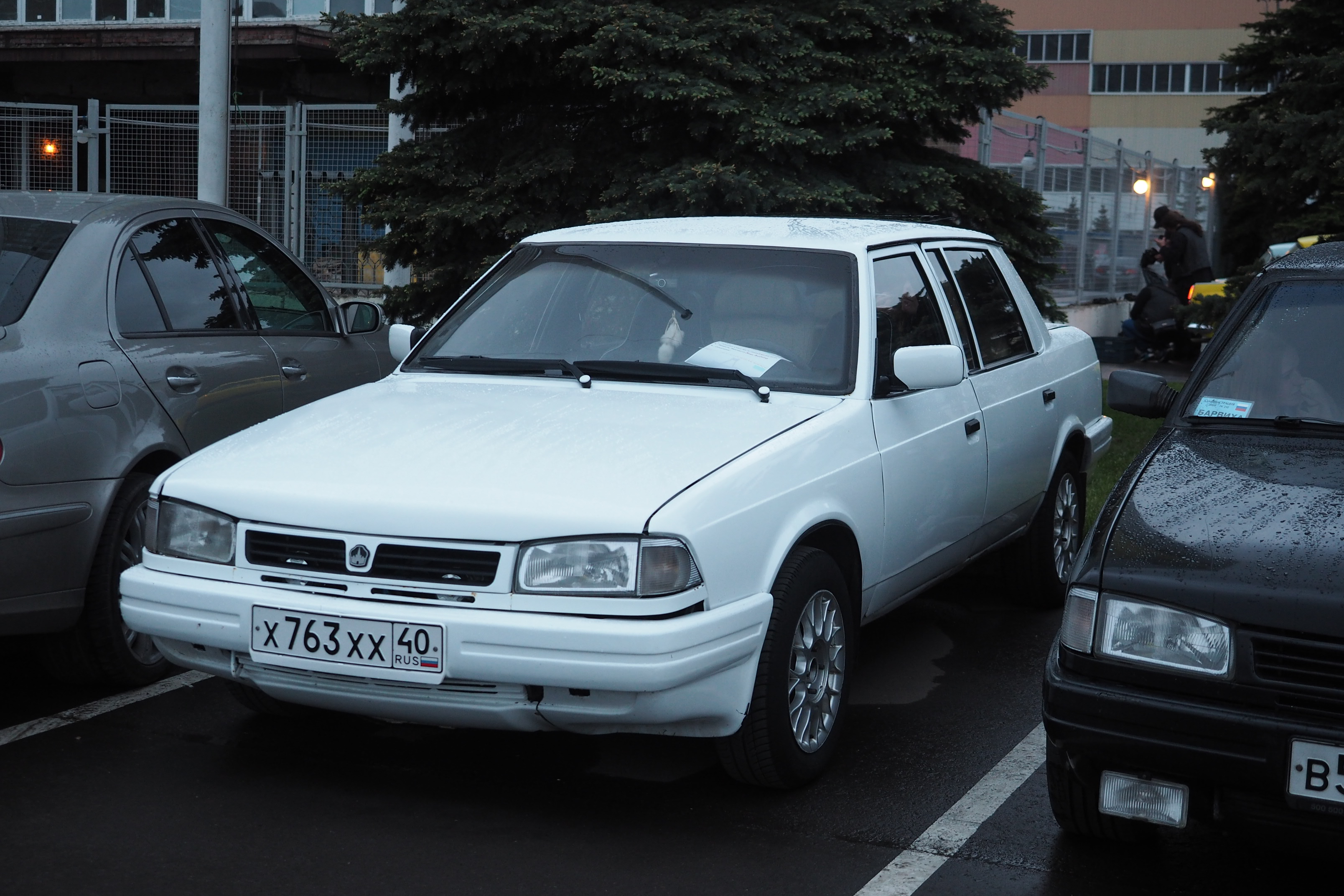

Overview
- Manufacturer: Moskvitch Stock Company
- Production: 1997–2002
- Assembly: Russia: Moscow; Bulgaria: Lovech (Balkancar)

Body and chassis
- Class: Mid-size car
- Body style: 4-door sedan
- Layout: Longitudinal front-engine, front-wheel drive
- Related: Moskvitch 2141

Powertrain
- Engine: 1.6L VAZ-2106-70 I4; 1.7L UZAM-331.17 I4; 2.0L Renault F3R SOHC I4; 2.0L Renault F7R DOHC I4
- Transmission: 5-speed Manual

Dimensions
- Wheelbase: 2,980 mm (117.3 in)
- Length: 4.71–4.91 m (185.4–193.3 in)
- Width: 1.69 m (66.5 in)
- Height: 1.38 m (54.3 in)
- Curb weight: 1,125–1,080 kg (2,480.2–2,381.0 lb)

Chronology
- Predecessor: Moskvitch 2141

The Moskvitch 2142 is a line of large family cars produced by AZLK's Moskvitch division from 1998 to its bankruptcy in 2002. It was the last and most advanced line of Moskvitch vehicles, marking the end of the fifth generation. Only 3500 vehicles were produced, all aimed at executive and business markets.

== History ==
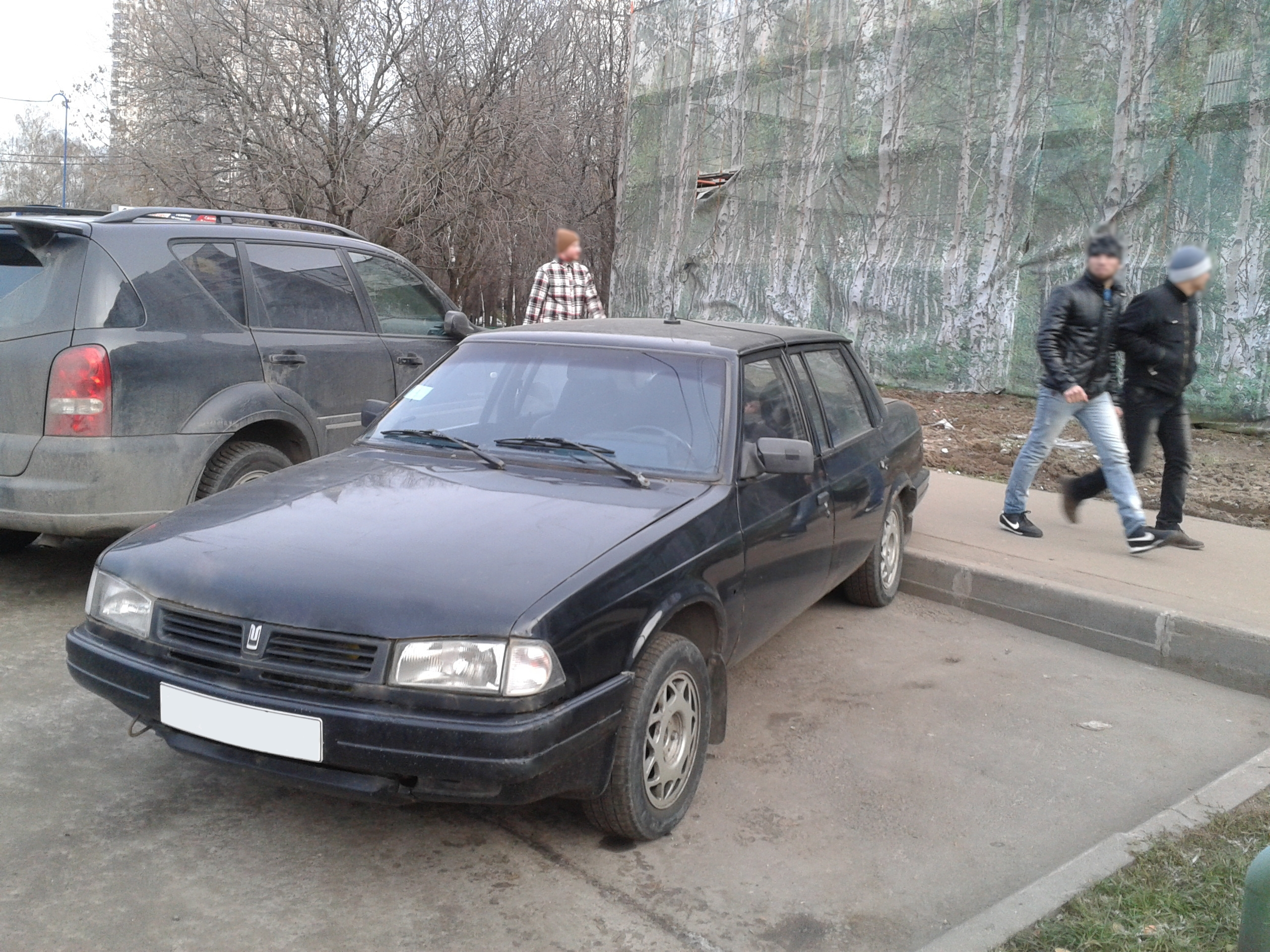
2000 Knjaz Vladimir photographed in Butovo

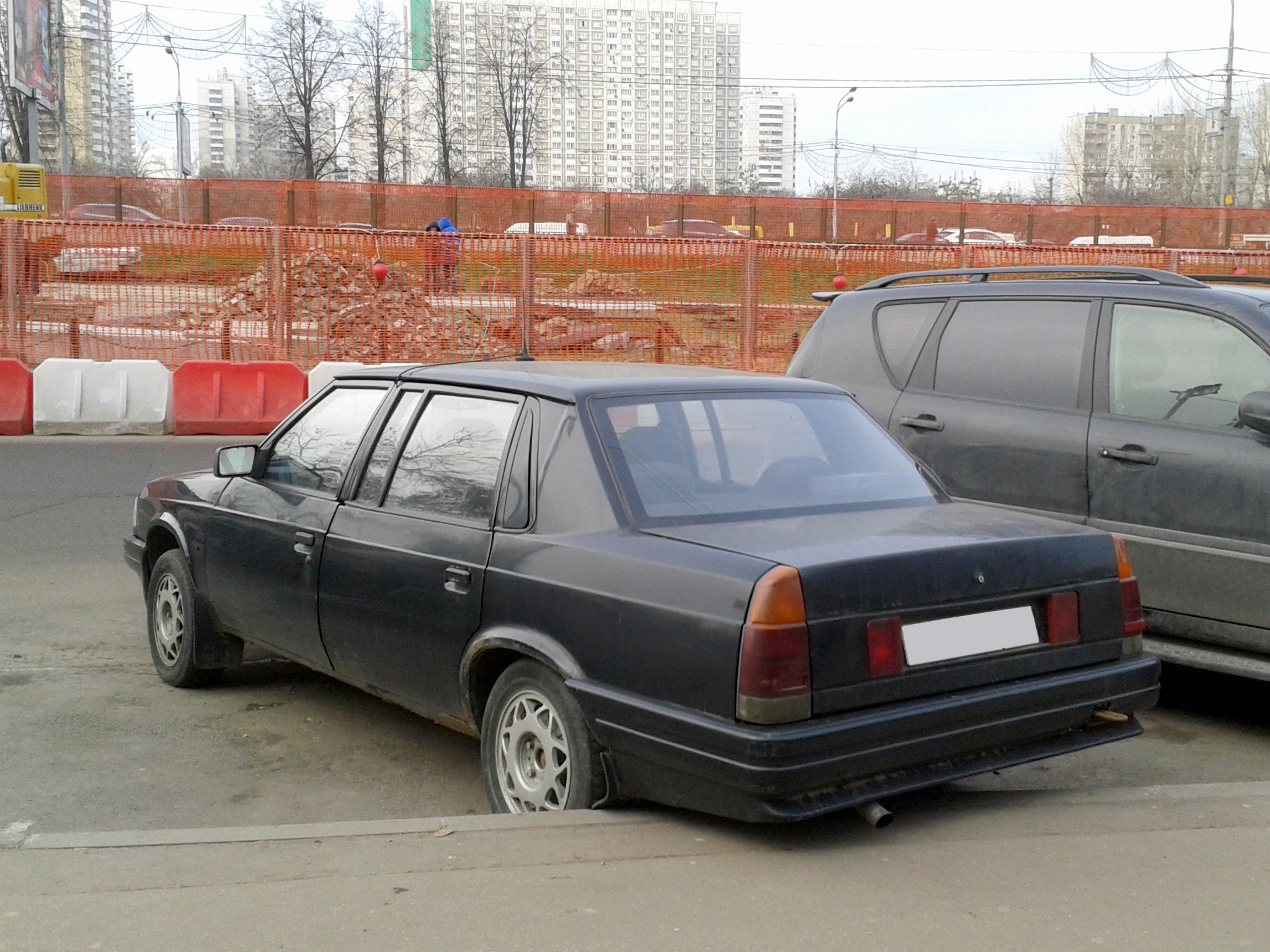
Rear view

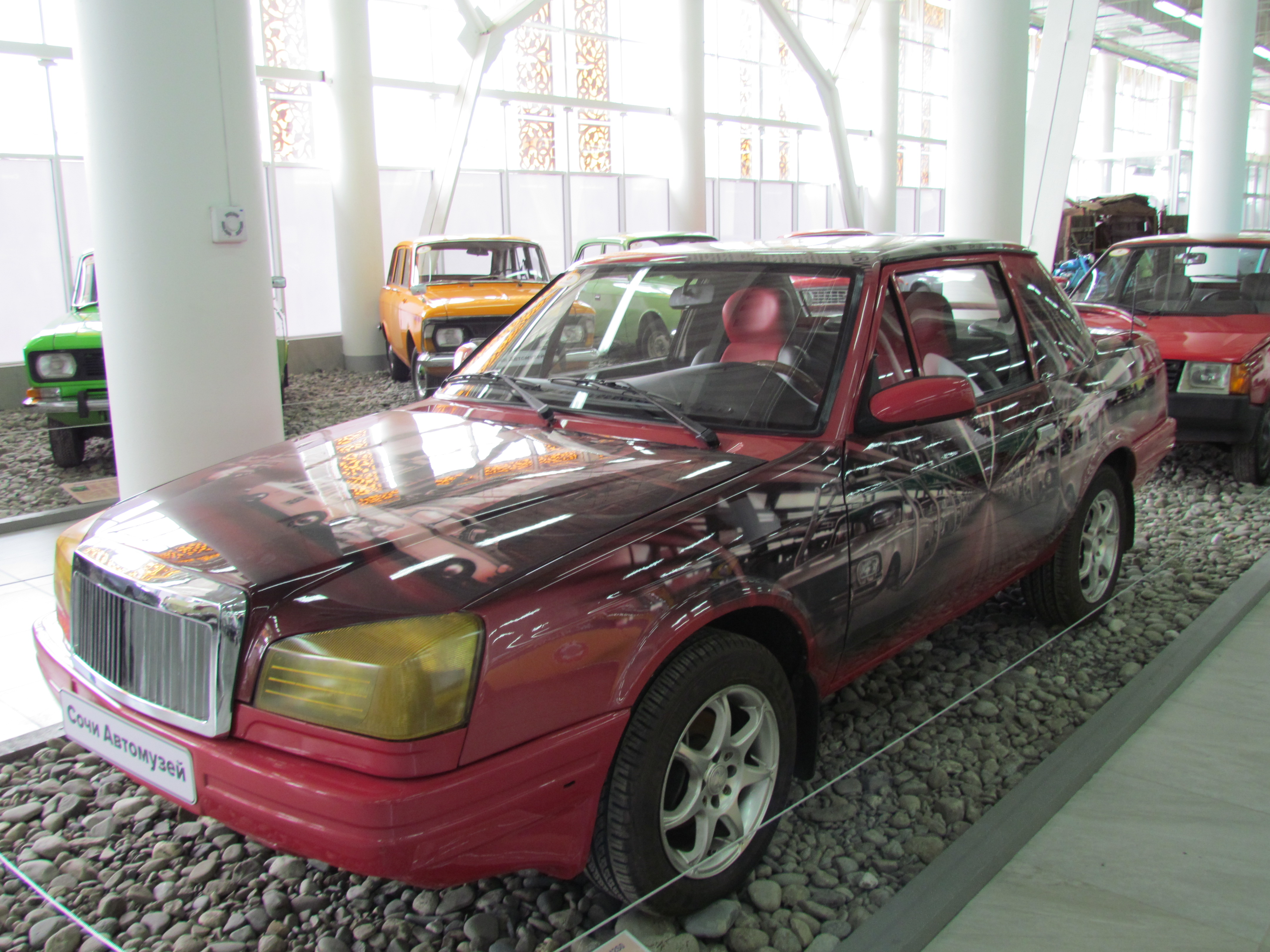
The Duet coupé first series, with the original grille

Three versions of the 2142 were marketed: the Knjaz Vladimir (large family saloon), Ivan Kalita (executive saloon), and the Duet (executive coupé), which was introduced several months later. The Knjaz Vladimir was the least expensive of the brand, followed by the more upscale Ivan Kalita, both of whom were introduced in September 1998. The Duet, introduced in May 1999, was a shortened variant based on the bodyshell of the 2141 Aleko and using the ornate, chromed grille of the Ivan Kalita. In 2002, just four months before failure, the Duet received a slight grille facelift update, using a sleeker unit similar to that of the Knjaz Vladimir (Series II).

All 2142 models were fitted with Renault engines, which was an initiative on the side of the projected merger with AvtoVAZ in the late 1990s. Seeing as AvtoVAZ was in direct competition to AZLK at the time, and succeeded much more in lower-scale demand, Renault rejected the offer in 2002, forcing AZLK to stop production. All models were discontinued by mid-August 2002, and the company filed for bankruptcy on 3 September 2002.
