= Aleko =

Russian mid-size car made by Moskvitch

Moskvitch 2141 Aleko
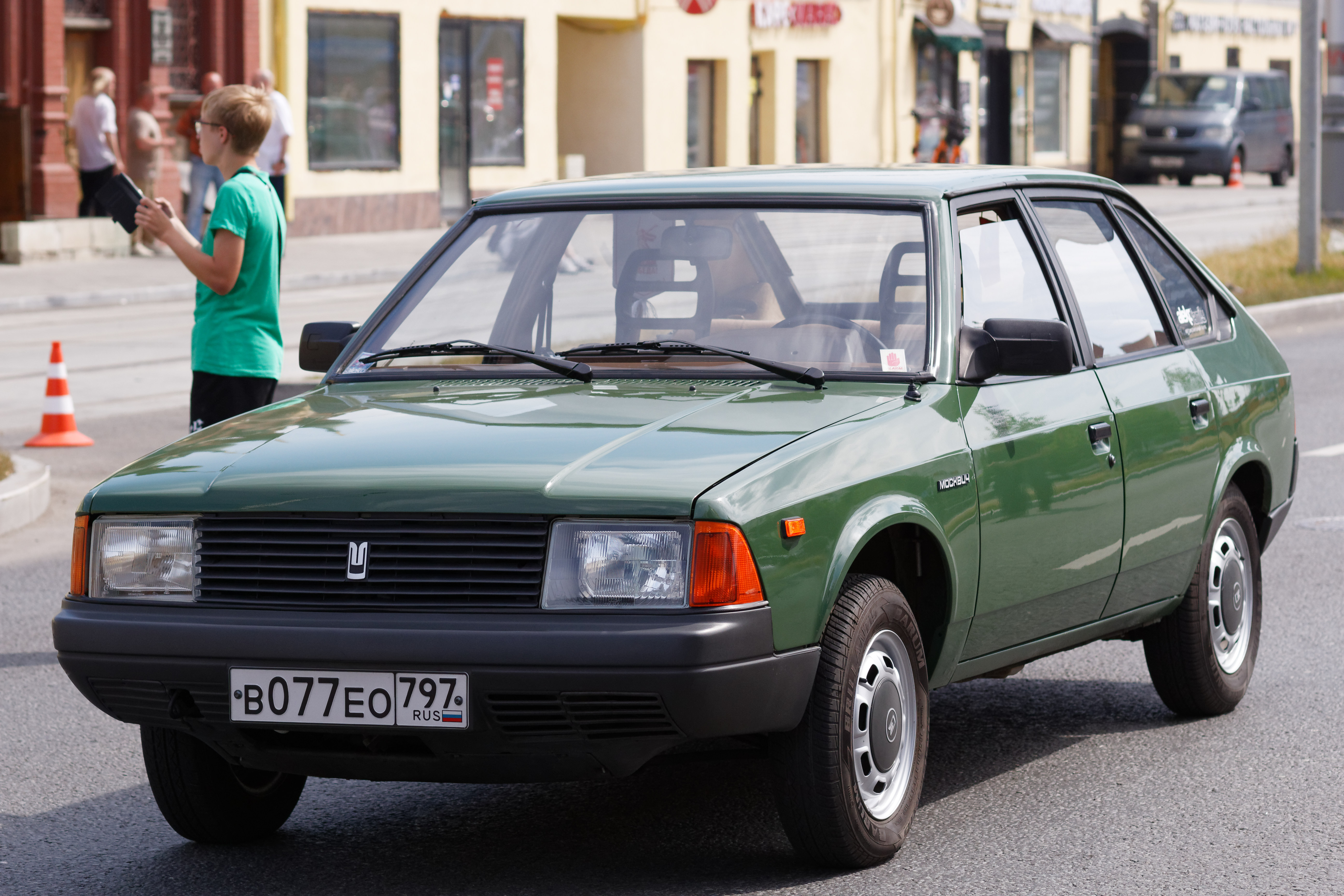
- Moskvitch 2141S "Aleko"

Overview
- Manufacturer: Moskvitch Stock Company
- Also called: Lada Aleko (for cars exported by AvtoVAZ)
- Production: 1986–1997 (1998–2002 for the more advanced M-2141-02/-45/-00/-22 versions)
- Assembly: Soviet Union/Russia: Moscow; Bulgaria: Lovech (Balkancar)

Body and chassis
- Class: Mid-size/Large family car (D)
- Body style: 5-door hatchback
- Layout: Longitudinal front-engine, front-wheel drive
- Related: Simca 1307/1308; Moskvitch 2142; Lada Samara; ZAZ Tavria

Powertrain
- Engine: petrol: 1.5 L UZAM-331.10 I4; 1.6 L VAZ-2106-70 I4; 1.7 L VAZ-21213-70 I4; 1.7 L UZAM-3317 I4; 1.8 L UZAM-3318 I4; 2.0 L Renault F3R I4; diesel: 1.8 L Ford XLD418 I4; 1.9 L Peugeot XUD9 I4
- Transmission: 5-speed Manual

Dimensions
- Wheelbase: 2,580 mm (101.6 in)
- Length: 4.35 m (171.3 in)
- Width: 1.69 m (66.5 in)
- Height: 1.4 m (55.1 in)
- Curb weight: 1,070–1,080 kg (2,358.9–2,381.0 lb)

Chronology
- Predecessor: Moskvitch 2140
- Successor: Moskvitch 2142

The Moskvitch-2141, also known under the trade name Aleko (Russian: "АЛЕКО", derivative from the name of the automaker "Автомобильный завод имени Ленинского Комсомола", Avtomobilnyj zavod imeni Leninskogo Komsomola, meaning "Automotive Factory of Lenin's Komsomol"), is a Russian mid-size car that was first announced in 1985 and sold in the Soviet Union and its successor states between 1986 and 1997 by the Moskvitch Company, based in Moscow, Russia. It was replaced by the modernised M-214145 Svyatogor and its sedan body version, the M-2142, in 1997–2002.

The Aleko was a huge improvement over previous Moskvitch models, which were durable but old-fashioned sedans and station wagons with rear-wheel drive and a solid rear axle, and had no common parts with them apart from the engine and some other minor details.

== Features ==
The new car had such innovative features as front-wheel drive, a hatchback body style, MacPherson strut front suspension and torsion-crank rear suspension. It had rack-and-pinion steering and a collapsible steering column. The spare tyre was located underneath the boot and was accessible from outside, in the tradition of French cars. The wheelbase went up almost 20 centimetres (7.9 in), the body got 14 centimetres (5.5 in) wider, the wheel size went up one inch (14 inches). The car became more spacious, comfortable and safe. For the first time in the history of Soviet and Russian car making, the car's profile was optimized for aerodynamics, with the help of Russian and, partially, French engineers, who shortly cooperated with them at the final stage of the development process. The officially reported drag coefficient was 0.35.

== History ==
Before the development of the M-2141 started, Moskvitch engineers had been working on a new series of rear-wheel drive cars and had developed it to the stage of pre-production prototypes. However, surprisingly for them, the Minister of Automobile Industry required them to cease all work on the unfinished project and instead create a front-wheel drive car with its upper part identical to that of the French Simca 1307, which was favoured by him. While this decision helped to cut the development costs, it came as an insult to the engineers and designers, who had their own mock-ups of the future car ready. Designer Igor Zaytsev recalled that it took more than a month to motivate his disappointed colleagues to get involved in the new project.

However, besides the fact that the AZLK designers considered it "insulting and humiliating" to copy an existing car, it came out that the new powertrain and chassis required a different bodyshell, and despite the two cars having similar shapes, the only parts of the French car that were borrowed to the Moskvitch-2141 were some constructive elements of the roof and the form of the window seals. As the company's chief designer Yuri Tkachenko stated in 1992, the differences between the Simca and the M-2141 were so numerous and significant that it was more correct to say what details were borrowed from the Simca rather than what was added to its design. It is only the top of the body that these models have in common. The existing engine was too long for transverse placement, so it was placed longitudinally, like on the Renault 20/30 or Audi 80/100 series.

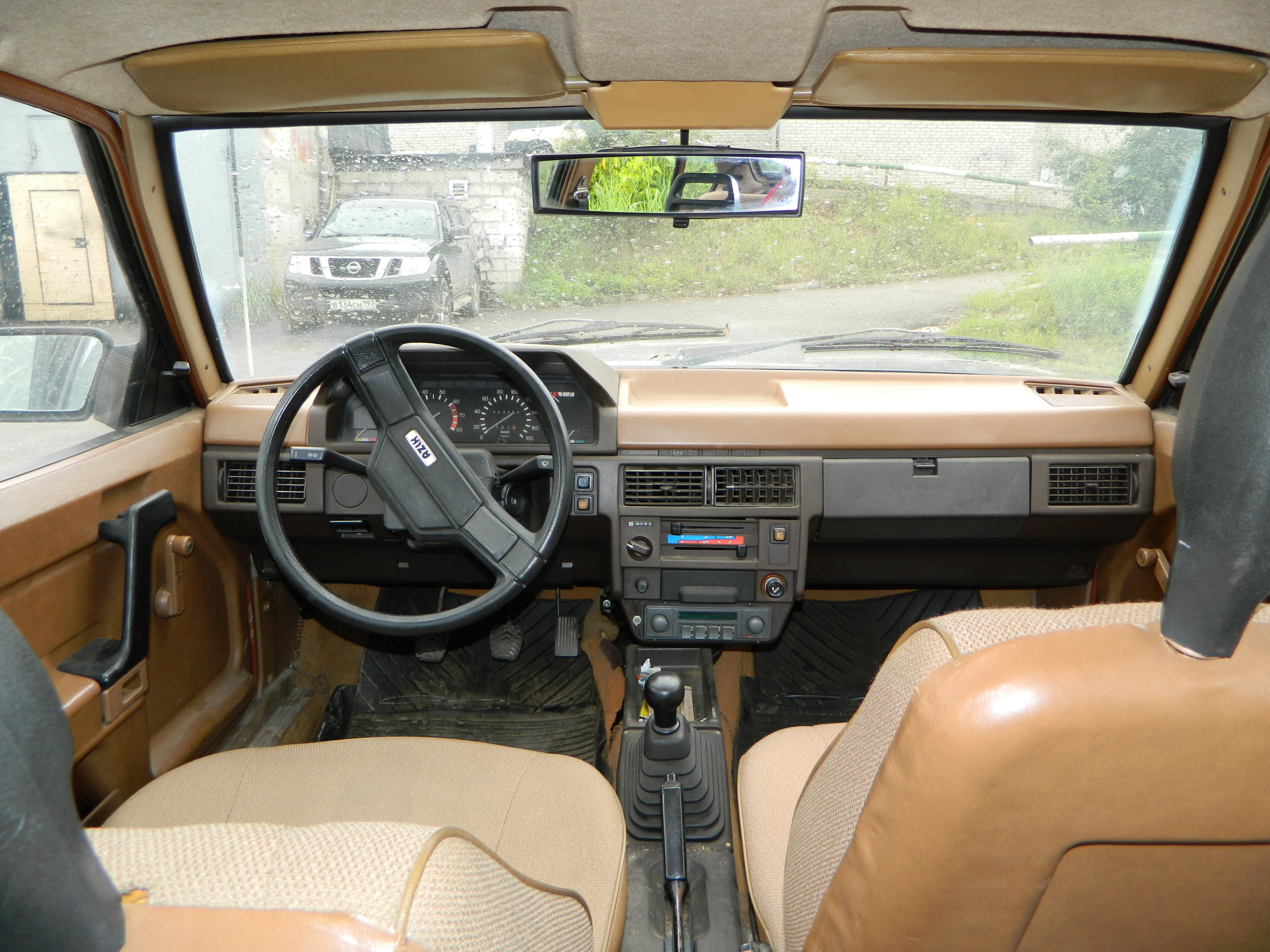
Aleko interior

The Aleko turned out to be quite a breakthrough for the Soviet automotive industry of its time. It almost became the first front-wheel drive hatchback of the Soviet Union, but due to the fact that its development took a further two years for Moskvitch to set up the manufacturing, the Lada Samara arrived first. Although the M-2141 had a more comfortable design than the Samara, the dissolution of the Soviet Union in 1991 followed by an economic crisis, financial mismanagement and disruptions in the work of the company caused a decline in assembling quality in the 1990s and damaged the reputation of this car in the markets. Nonetheless, even then, it was still praised for a high level of passive safety, robustness of construction, good off-road capabilities, and ease of repair. In 2001 the aging M-2141, designed in the late 1970s and early 1980s and lacking modern airbags and seatbelts with pretensioners, was awarded zero stars out of a possible four by the new Russian ARCAP safety assessment program, but the reviewers pointed out that for a 20-year-old car it showed an "excellent" crash-test result. The steering column and the A-pillar were displaced less than in the Citroën Xantia and early Audi A4.

Before 1991, AZLK designers also created the four-wheel-drive Moskvich-21416SE and a sedan version of the M-2141 equipped with a different steering wheel and an electronic instrument cluster that was publicly demonstrated in 1990, but none of these cars were put into series production due to the hardships brought by the collapse of the Soviet Union. Although AZLK had designed and fully tested a new and more powerful generation of four-cylinder gasoline and diesel engines for the M-2141, the construction of the company's engine production plant was stopped and never resumed.

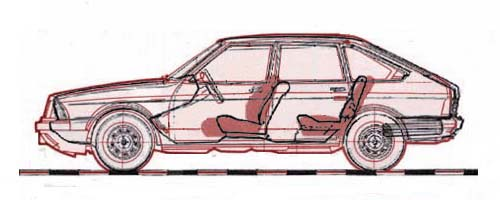
Comparison between the body design of the Simca 1307 (black) and the Aleko (red)

The Aleko was sold mostly on the domestic market, but in the late 1980s it was exported too. In some export markets, including France and Germany, the cars were advertised as the Lada Aleko, and diesel engines from Ford and Indenor could be delivered in addition to the standard petrol engines. The Ford diesel engine, manufactured in Dagenham, UK, made it onto the AZLK production lines in September 1991. Moskvitch had been negotiating the construction of an engine factory in the Soviet Union but the plans were scuppered by a lack of hard currency. The Aleko was also assembled in Bulgaria under licence for a brief period in the late 1980s.

Some of the last Moskvitch models to be built were the upgraded and facelifted Alekos that were renamed Svyatogor (models 214122, 214100, 214145). A version with the wheelbase extended by 20 cm (7.9 in) called the Yury Dolgorukiy (2141Y2 Юрий Долгорукий; 1997–2002, named after the historic Grand Prince of Kiev) was also built, albeit only in small numbers. Still based on the design of the M-2141, the Dolgorukiy was built in two series: the first had the original, large, rectangular headlamps, while the second series received the Svyatogor's facelifted front treatment.

In 1990, the Aleko was involved in a fatal accident that saw the death of Viktor Tsoi of the Soviet rock band Kino.

== Derivatives and naming variants ==
- Aleko 141 (for foreign market)
- Moskvich-2141 (for domestic market; Москвич-2141 in Cyrillic)
- AZLK-2141 (for domestic market; АЗЛК-2141 in Cyrillic)
- Svjatogor/Святогор (since 1997, for domestic market)
- АЗЛК-214145 (since 1997, Renault F3R 2.0 engine)

== Gallery ==
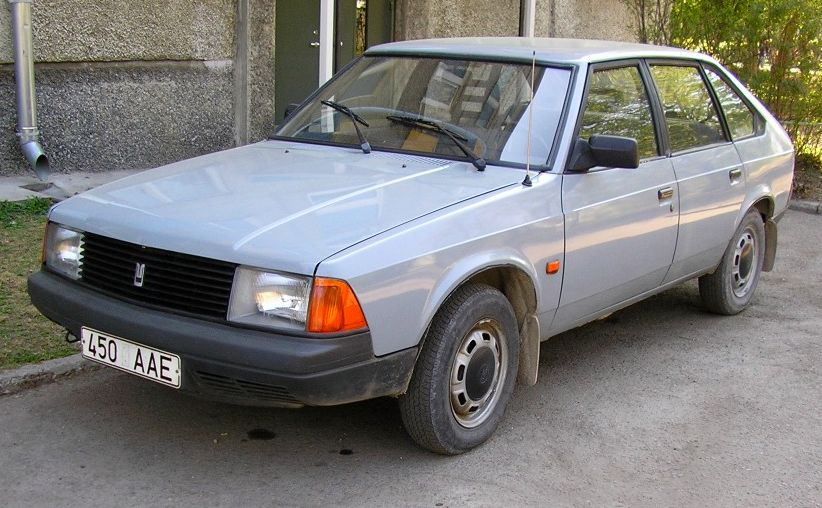

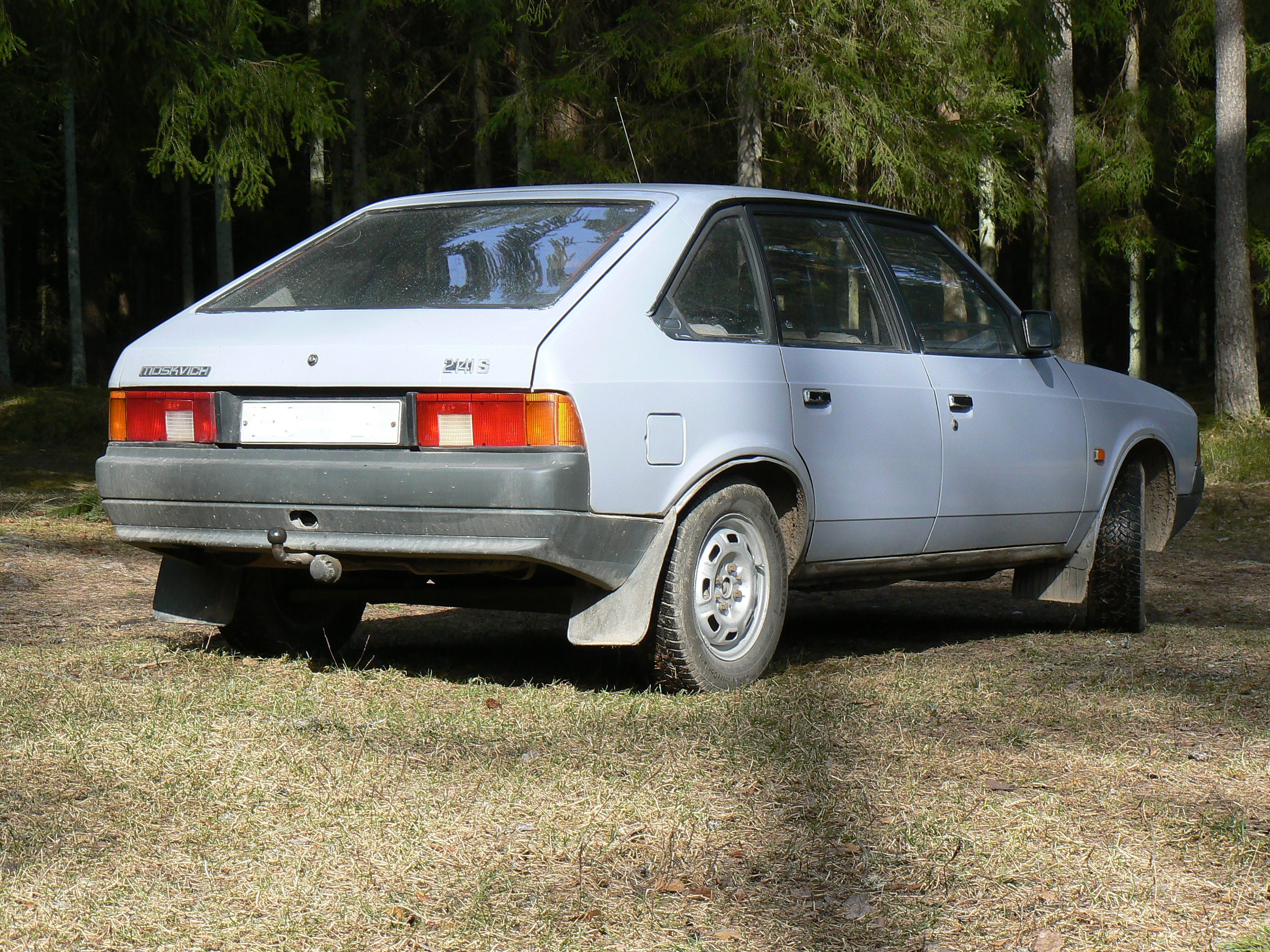
M-21412 alias M-2141S

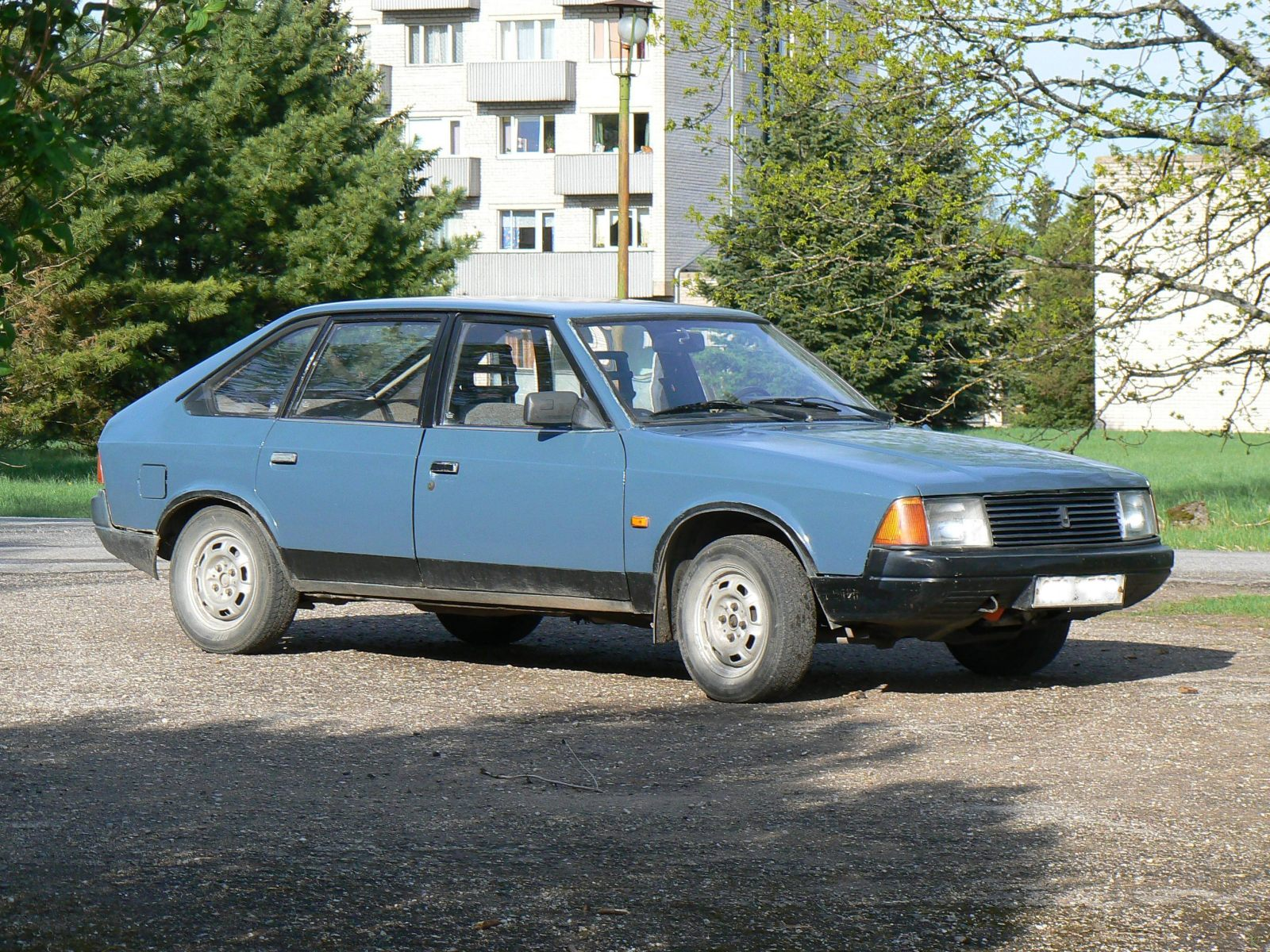
M-21412 alias M-2141S

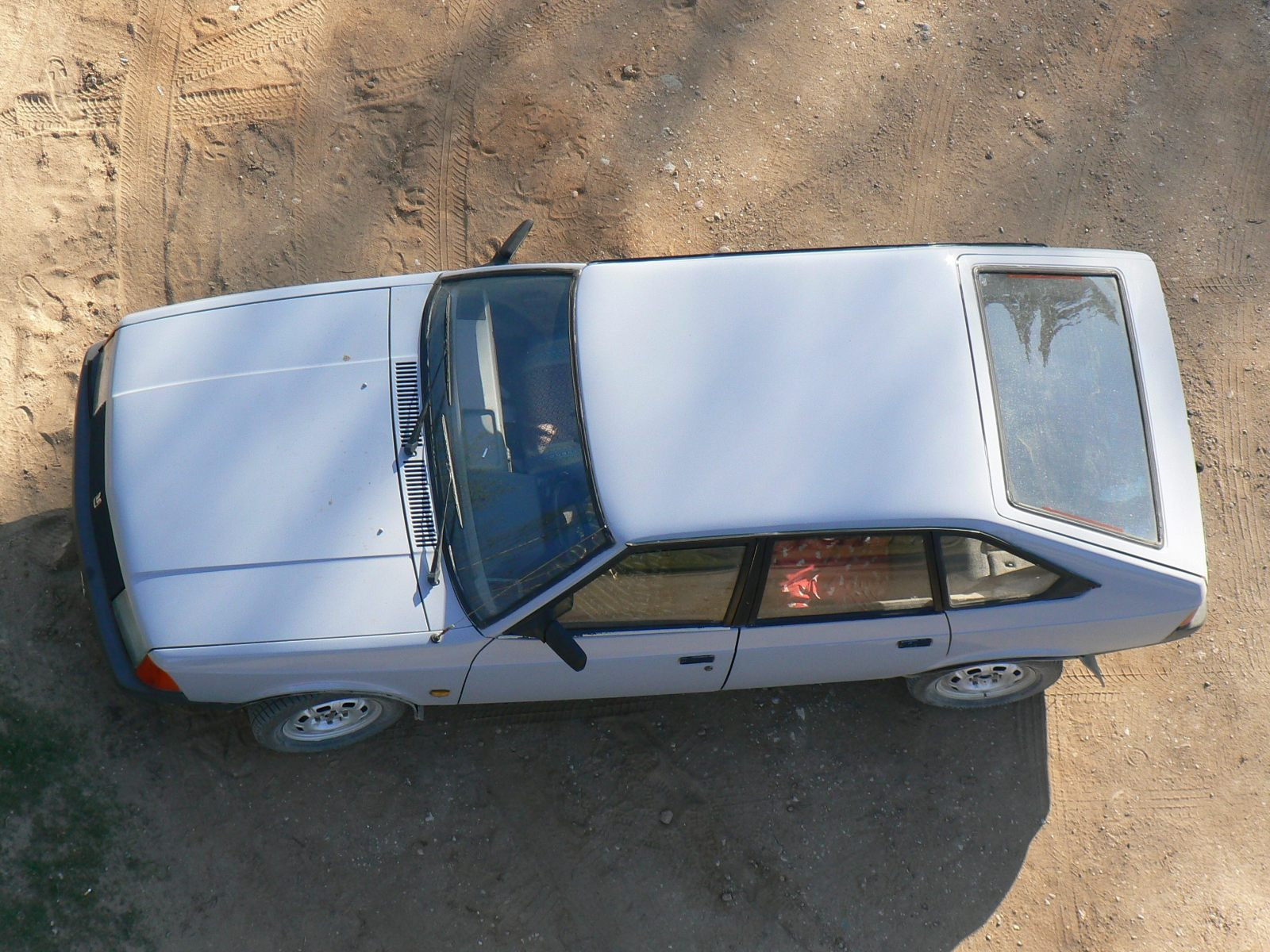
M-21412 alias M-2141S

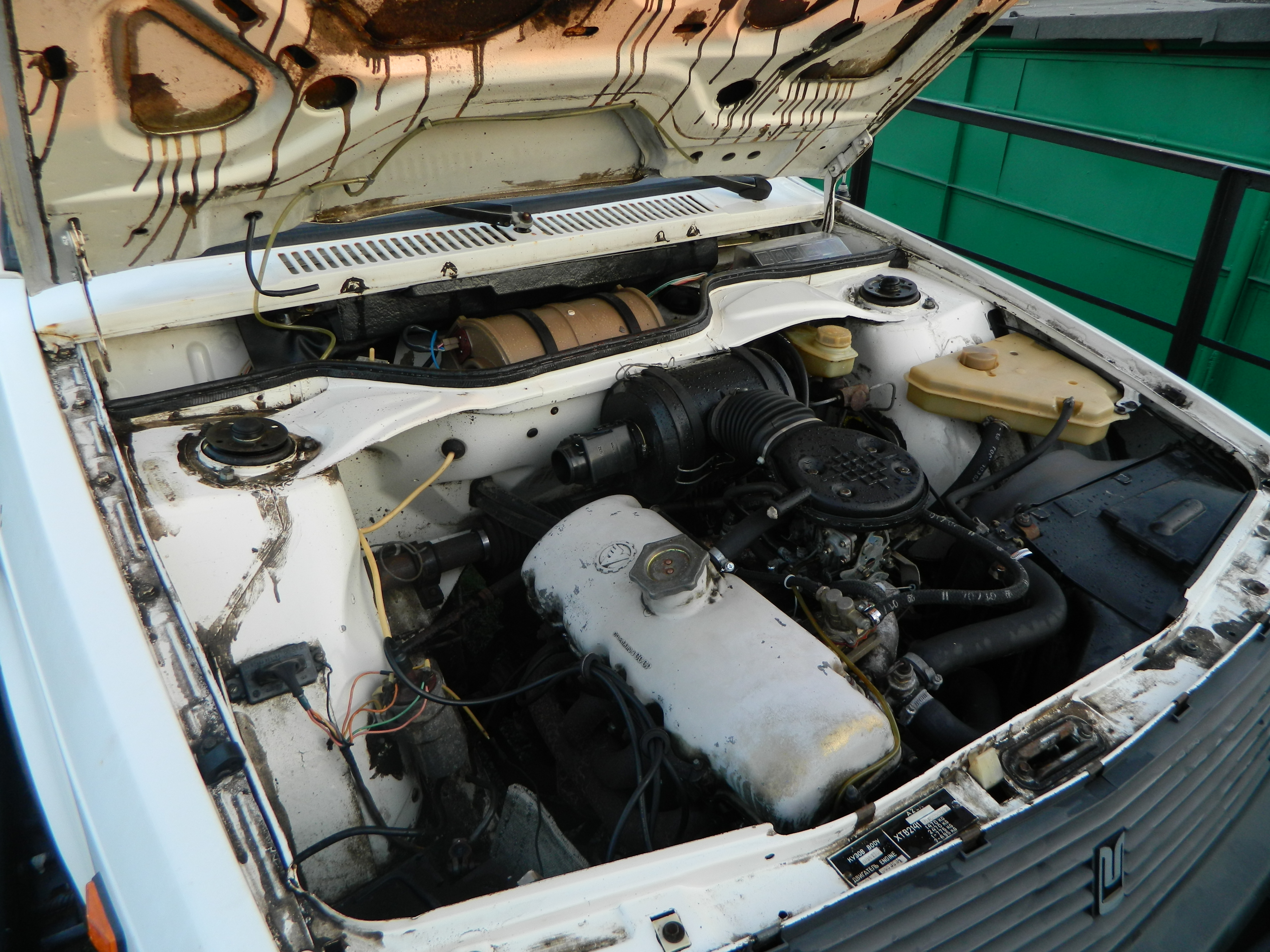
UZAM-331 engine (1989)

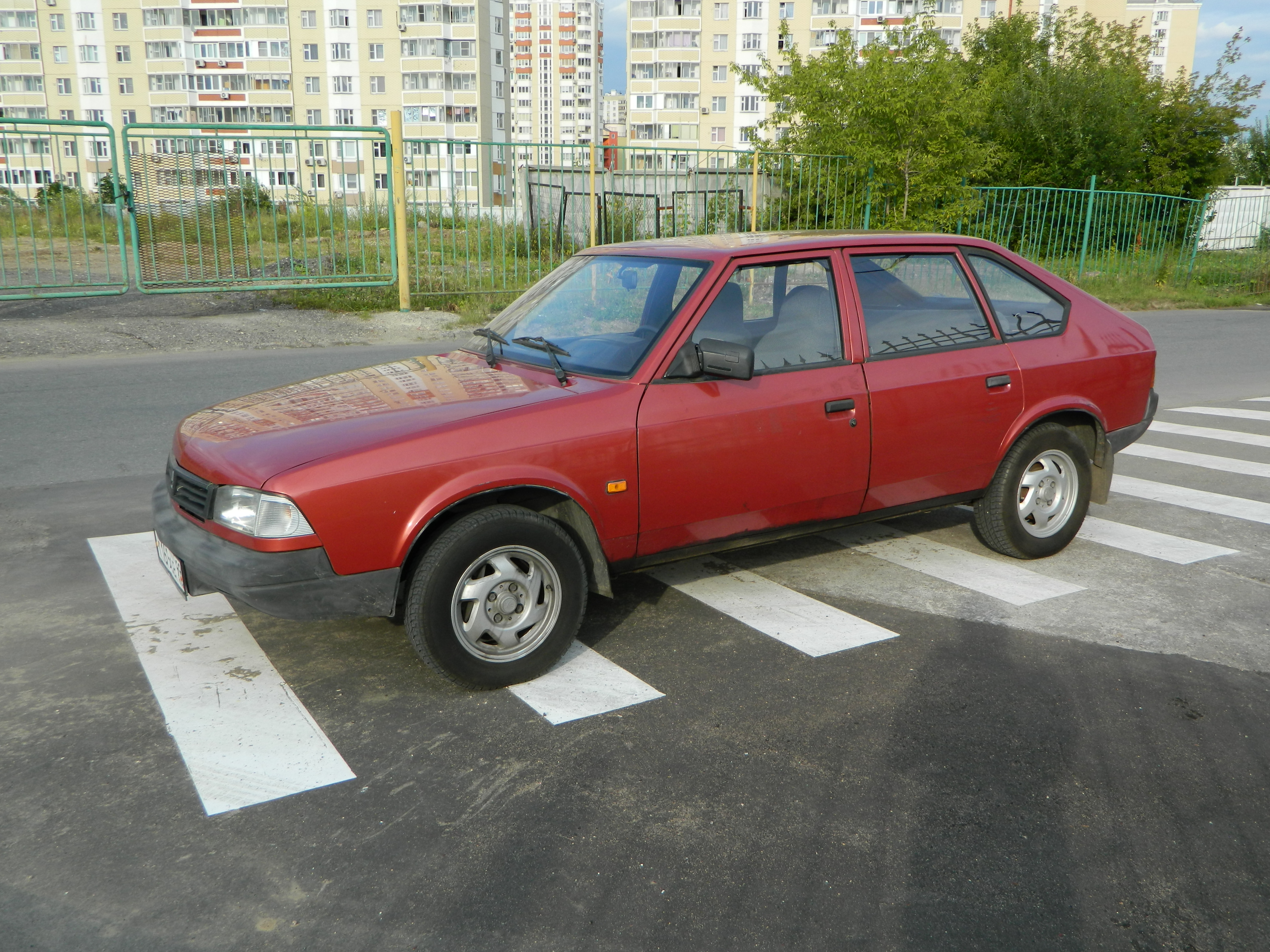
Svyatogor (Aleko post-1996 facelift)

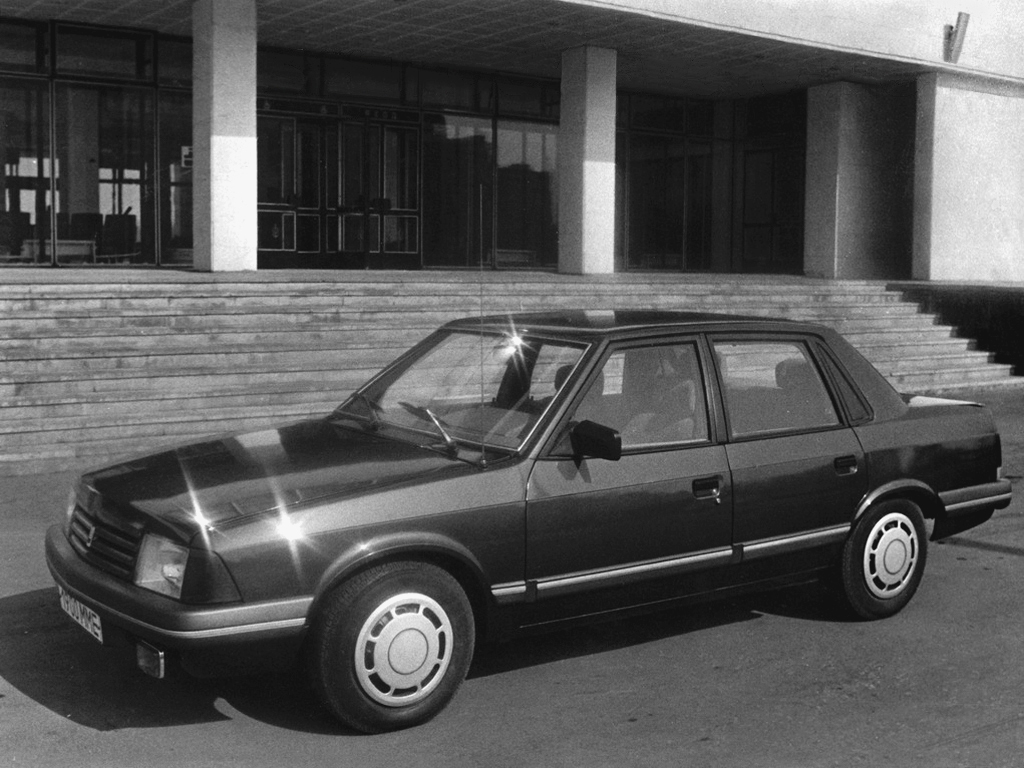

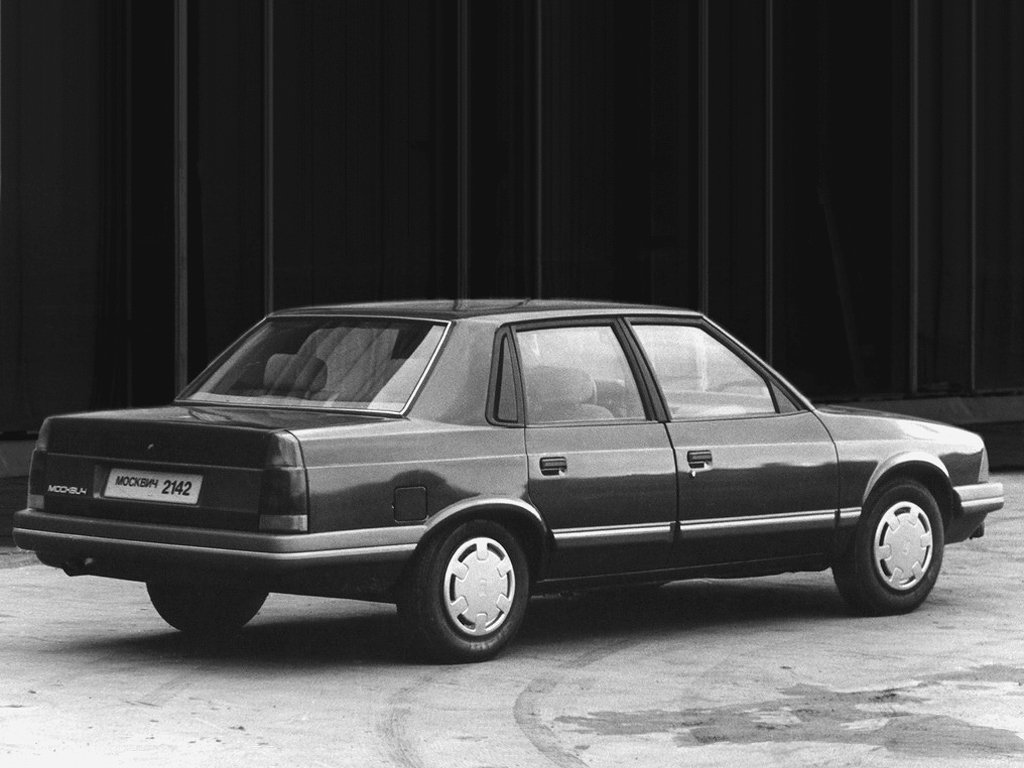
Moskvitch-2142 with sedan body (prototype)

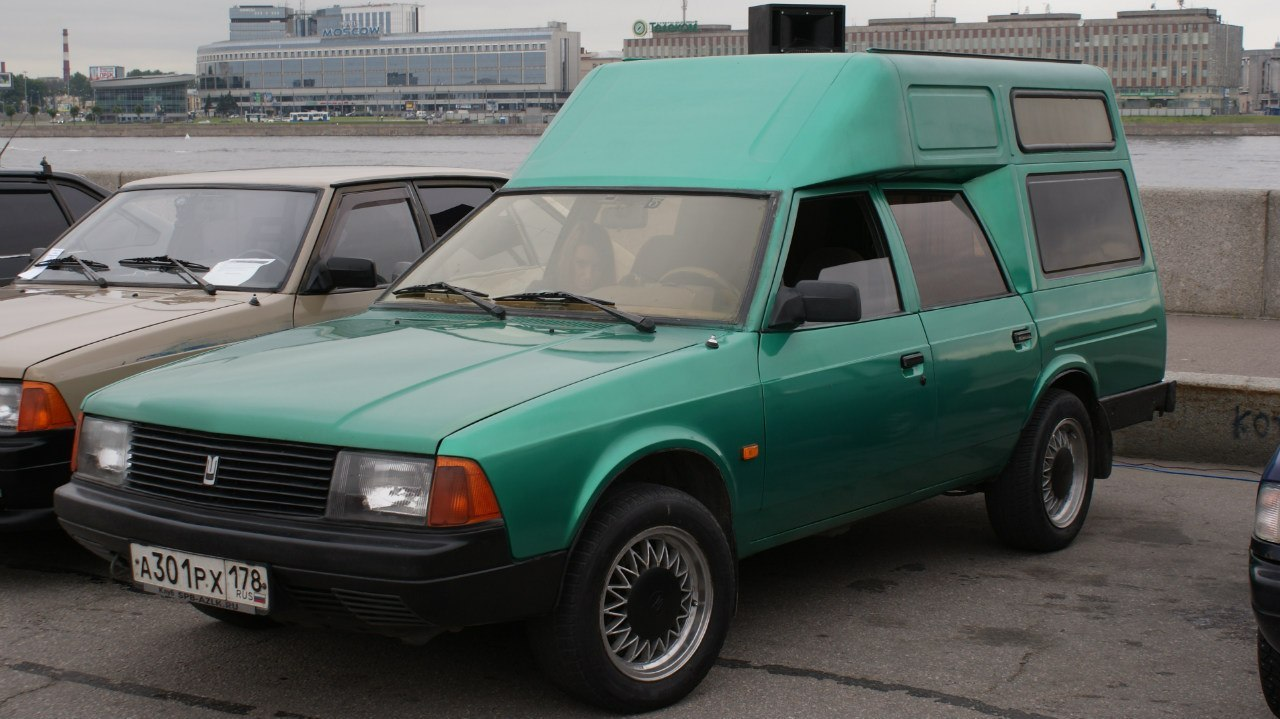
M-2901

2335

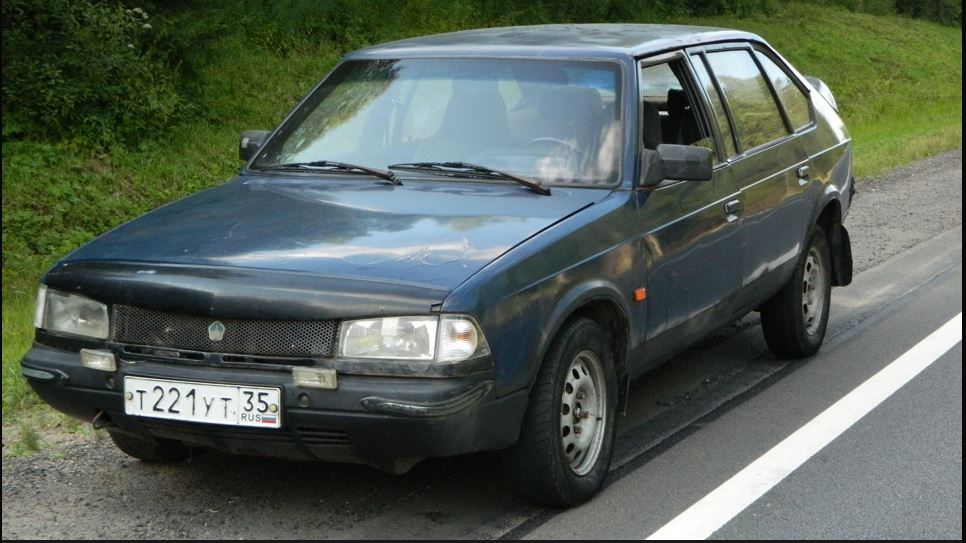
Moskvich 2141Y2 Dolgorukiy, with a slightly extended wheelbase
