= Moskvitch 2140 =

Soviet small family car (1976–1988)

Moskvich 2138/2140/1500 SL
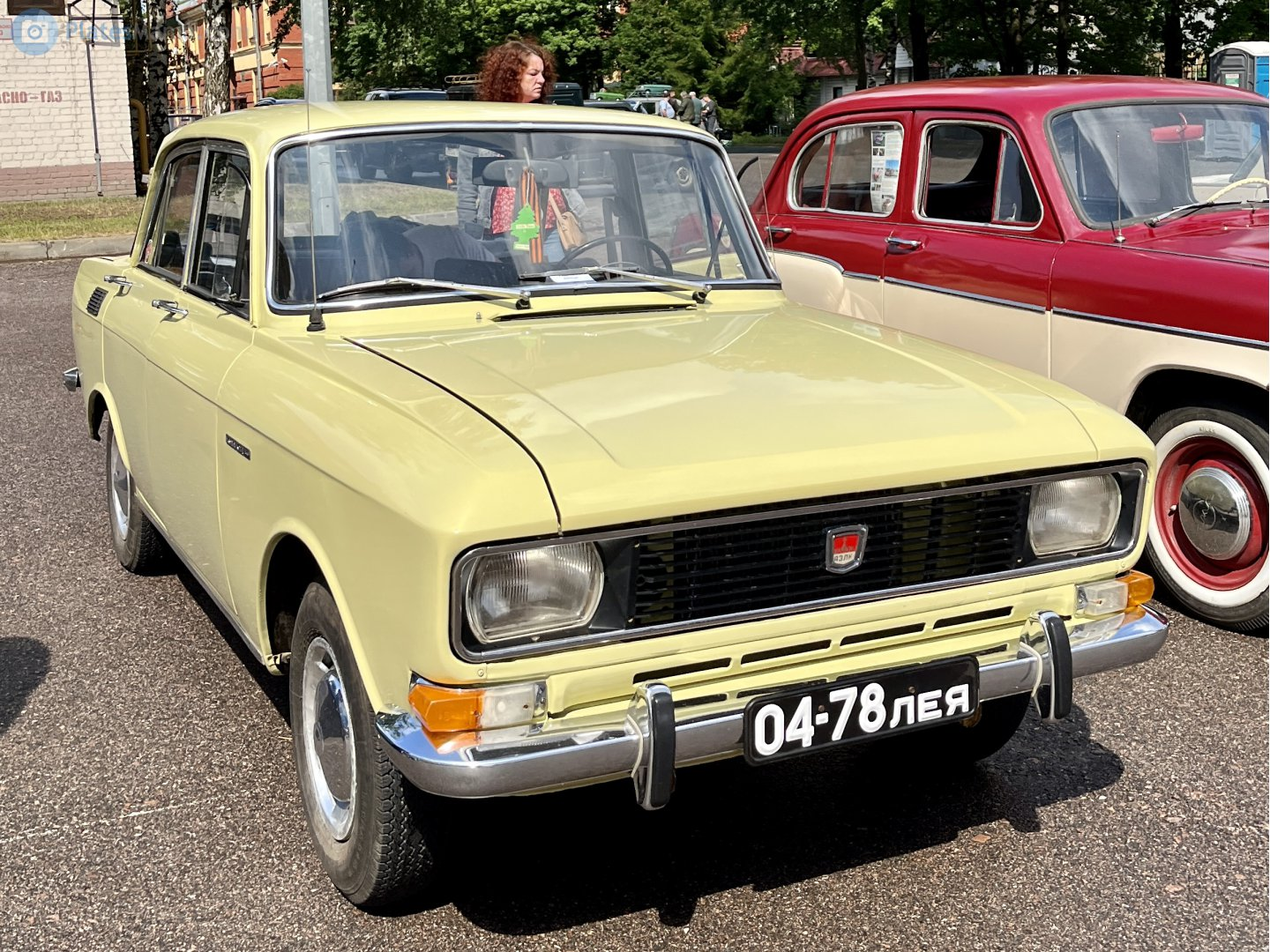

Overview
- Manufacturer: AZLK
- Also called: Moskvitch 1360; Moskvitch 1500; Moskvitch 1500 SL; Moskvitch 2140 SL
- Production: 1976–1988
- Assembly: Soviet Union: Moscow; Bulgaria: Lovech; Belgium: Antwerp

Body and chassis
- Class: Small family car
- Body style: 4-door sedan; 5-door station wagon; 3-door van
- Related: Izh 2125

Powertrain
- Engine: 1.5 L UZAM-412 I4

Dimensions
- Wheelbase: 2,400 mm (94.5 in)
- Length: 4,250 mm (167.3 in)
- Width: 1,550 mm (61.0 in)
- Height: 1,480 mm (58.3 in)

Chronology
- Predecessor: Moskvitch 408; Moskvitch 412
- Successor: Moskvitch Aleko

The Moskvitch 2140 series (Russian: Москвич-2140) is a small family car produced by Soviet automotive maker AZLK from January 1976 to July 1988. It started first as Moskvitch 2138 and Moskvitch 2140 on a modified 412 platform. Pre-production models were shown during 1975. The Moskvitch 2140 SL/Moskvitch 1500 SL was an upmarket export variant, first publicly showcased in November 1980 for the 50th anniversary of AZLK, its production started in summer 1981; compared to the regular M-2140, it had large plastic bumpers with integrated side markers/turn signals, larger taillight units, plastic moldings on the door sides, and completely revised interior with new dashboard, steering wheel, and seats.

Compared to the 412 family, the Moskvitch-2140 used black plastic grille, updated recessed door handles, and a revised rear end design with rectangular taillight units, surrounded by a black panel; the dashboard and the steering wheel were also updated. Many of these traits were first introduced on the latest (November-December 1975) Moskvitch-412s, starting from the rear end first. It was also the first 412-derived Moskvitch model to use disc brakes on the front wheels.

The Moskvitch-2140 line was facelifted throughout the second half of 1981 into the beginning of 1982, with the M-2140 SL already having all these features since its debut: the red shield logo with Kremlin towers silhouettes was changed to an "АЗЛК"/"AZLK" wordmark in gray metallic font; the chrome trim around the grille, windows and rocker panels was removed; the black panel at the rear section between the headlights was now body-colored; the chrome hubcaps were discontinued and the cars were now delivered with plain steel wheels; the front doors now had single-piece windows without the quarter glass; the "Moskvich 1500/1360" fender badges and the "1500"/"1360" rear panel badge were removed; and the Latin "Moskvich" badge on the trunk lid was replaced with Cyrillic "Москвич" (pre-1982 Moskvitches, except for the M-21406, always had Latin badges, domestic-market cars included), though the M-2140 SL retained the Latin badging even for its domestic market. The 408-engined line, at this point consisting solely of the M-2138 sedan, was discontinued soon thereafter in December 1982, and the few 2138s built during the facelift era became visually indistinguishable from the 412-engined 2140-series sedans due to the removal of the engine displacement badges. The station wagon variant Moskvitch-2137 was the last of the Soviet cars to still feature taillight fins, which remained unchanged until the model was discontinued in February 1985.

Although originally designed and often referred to as the "fourth generation", the series was, in fact, only an improved variant of the third generation of Moskvitches, the M-408/412. The brand-new fourth generation entered in production with the Moskvitch-2141 Aleko starting in 1986 and remaining at a low scale, until the M-2140 was eventually discontinued in July 1988 and the M-2141 took its place at AZLK's main assembly line.

== Models and variants ==
Limited production and prototype variants in italics.

- Moskvitch-2140 (export name Moskvitch 1500): 4-door sedan model with standard UZAM-412 (75 hp) 1.5L engine. The Moskvitch-2140 entered production in January 1976 and was discontinued in July 1988. Badging: originally "Moskvich" on the trunk lid, "1500" below the rear right taillight, "Moskvich 1500" on the front fenders; only "Москвич" on the trunk lid after the facelift.
- Moskvitch-2138 (export name Moskvitch 1360, produced in 1976–1982): 4-door sedan model with low-power MZMA-408 (50 hp) 1.36L engine. After the UZAM plant managed to expand its production rate in mid-1970s, the 408-engined Moskvitch models remained as largely vestigial configurations built in small numbers, compared to the earlier output of the Moskvitch-408/412, relatively equal in their numbers. Produced mainly for fleets due to using the lower-grade A-76 gasoline, though still available for retail consumers, its export presence was low and largely limited to Comecon states. The Moskvitch-2138 was phased out with the introduction of the UZAM-412D engine, which used the same fuel, but shared the architecture with the standard UZAM-412. Badging: same as on 2140, but "1360" instead of "1500".
- Moskvitch-21401 (1976-1988): four-door medical dispatch sedan, successor of the M-412M. It was used purely as a house call transport for the doctors and did not have accommodations for the patients, differing from the retail M-2140 sedan only in standard medical livery and minor interior simplifications.
- Moskvitch-21381 (1976-1982): four-door medical dispatch sedan, successor of the M-408M, same differences as the 21401 above.
- Moskvitch-21402: four-door sedan export model with right-hand-drive steering. Presumably remained a prototype, as the UK ceased importing Moskvitch cars prior to the debut of the 2140 series, and AZLK didn't serve any other right-hand-drive markets. Provisional indices "Moskvitch-21372" and "Moskvitch-27342" were planned for RHD station wagons and panel vans, though none were built.
- Moskvitch-21406 (October 1978-1988): four-door sedan for rural usage, the first 2140-series Moskvitch model to use the UZAM-412D engine, derated for low-octane A-76 fuel (68 hp). Modifications included reinforced suspension, drum brakes on all four wheels, protected oil crankcase, towing eye underneath the rear bumper, and winter tires as a stock option. The only two immediately visible cosmetic differences from the regular 2140 sedan were the Cyrillic "Москвич" badges on the front fenders and the trunk lid and the absence of chrome hubcaps; modern recollections commonly falsely attribute other post-facelift traits, like the absence of the black rear panel or the "АЗЛК" wordmark logo, as inherent to the 21406, even though pre-1981 M-21406s retained the black panel and other traits in question. After the 1982 facelift, both the Cyrillic badging and the plain wheels were incorporated into all 2140-series Moskvitch cars, making the 21406 indistinguishable from the outside. Through 1978-1981, the M-21406 was produced in extremely small numbers, entering true mass production only after the facelift. Never exported.
- Moskvitch-21403 (November 1979-1988): four-door sedan with hand controls for disabled drivers (throttle "paddles" on the steering column, brake lever to the bottom right, clutch lever to the middle right), also used the UZAM-412D engine, successor of the Moskvitch-408B (the 412B didn't exist). Unlike the SMZ microcars and the disability variants of the ZAZ Zaporozhets, which were leased for free, it was leased for a one-time payment.
- Moskvitch-2140-117 (domestically marketed as Moskvitch-2140 SL, marketed outside of the USSR as Moskvitch 1500 SL; June 1981–1988): luxury four-door sedan model with plastic bumpers with integrated turn signals/side markers, new taillights (slightly larger and with integrated reversing lights, which were previously separate lamps), and completely revised upmarket interior with new dashboard, steering wheel and seats. The exterior and interior components were sourced from "Saturnus", Ljubljana, present-day Slovenia, in exchange for importing the cars into Yugoslavia. It was also the first 2140-series Moskvitch to use metallic factory paints, though in limited numbers for export deliveries. The badges and plastic moldings were attached via East German double-sided tape instead of conventional screws and holes, which often resulted in the cars losing their trim in harsh weather conditions. Badging: "Moskvich 1.5" on the trunk lid right, "SL" on the trunk lid left and front fenders.
- Moskvitch-2140-121 (1985-1988): four-door taxi sedan equipped with UZAM-412D low compression engine, a taximeter, a "Taxi" roof sign, and easily cleanable seats upholstered with synthetic leather.
- Moskvitch-2137 (1976-1985): station wagon with UZAM-412 engine, successor of the Moskvitch-427. It was the last of the station wagon Moskvitches with no actual successor besides the Izh-2125 Kombi liftback, and its production line was repurposed for the Moskvitch-2141. Due to its smaller production numbers and restrictions on station wagon sales, it did not achieve the same degree of popularity as the VAZ-2102 (which was more numerous despite still being affected by restrictions) or the aforementioned Kombi (which was less affected by them). Badging: originally "Moskvich" on the tailgate and "Moskvich 1500" on the front fenders; only "Москвич" on the tailgate after the facelift.
- Moskvitch-2136 (1976-1977): station wagon with M-408 engine, successor of the Moskvitch-426. Very few manufactured, variously estimated at low double digits, as the increased UZAM-412 production output lowered the demand for a 408-engined wagon and made it unnecessary. After its official discontinuation, small runs of Moskvitch station wagons equipped with the M-408 engine were manufactured until 1982, mainly to satisfy the yearly production quotas, and distributed to state services; despite technically fitting the M-2136 definition and specifications, these cars were considered M-2137s from the legal point of view.
- Moskvitch-2733/2734 (none/1976-1978): station wagon-based panel vans (M-408 and UZAM-412 respectively), successors of the Moskvitch-433/434 of the M-408/412 series, built for state institutions and banned from private ownership. The Moskvitch-2734 was discontinued in early 1978 after a brief run of approximately 4,000 units in favor of the Izh-2715 vans, which had more cargo space and were more convenient to use, though one-off units were still delivered until 1981. The Moskvitch-2733 appears to have never actually entered production, due to the low demand for underpowered vans rendering it unnecessary. Badging: same as on 2137.
- Moskvitch-27344: van-based light pickup, originally intended as an export variant, one right-hand-drive prototype built in mid-1970s. The decrease of AZLK's export presence, as well as its exit from the UK in 1976, led to the cancellation of the Moskvitch-27344, with AZLK never developing any actual pickups until the post-Soviet Aleko-based Moskvitch-2335.

From the moment of introduction of the UZAM-412D engine in 1978, a percentage of 2140-series Moskvitch cars of all variants and body styles, except for the M-2140 SL and those variants that already had it as the standard powertrain, were equipped with said engine and distributed along with the regular UZAM-412-engined cars, with no differentiation in marketing or legal documentation. The regular M-2140 sedan with UZAM-412D is sometimes associated with the index "Moskvitch-2140D", which, despite its appearances in official Soviet state media and other press, is not an official AZLK index; it has never been featured in repair manuals, NIIAT handbooks or any other materials directly associated with AZLK. The earliest known mention of the "Moskvitch-2140D" in Soviet print is in the February 1983 issue of Za Rulem, where the "M-2140D" is included in a table with ten Moskvitch variants in ongoing production that were available for ordinary citizens (even though this table also includes the long-discontinued 2136).

Throughout the entire run of the M-2140 series, continuing a format that has already been established in mid-1960s with the M-408/412 family, a small number of light pickups was built by modifying defective bodies of sedans and station wagons, the bed structure and dimensions varied between different specimen, though some of them were based on the Moskvitch-27344 prototype body mold. These pickups were used mainly as internal factory transports, were never distributed to citizens or state services, and never had an official index; the "Moskvitch-2315", sometimes associated with this pickup body style, is a modern fabrication never attested until 2008.

== Foreign assembly ==
As with the 408/412-series models, the Moskvitch-2140 and its variants were assembled from CKD kits in Antwerp, Belgium by Scaldia-Volga, and in Lovech, Bulgaria by the "Balkan" factory, both of which have previously assembled 408/412-series Moskvitch models.

Scaldia-Volga distributed the base 2140 and the 2137 station wagon, both could be equipped with either the stock 1.5L UZAM-412 engine, or the 1.75L Perkins 4.108 diesel engine (50hp). Due to the increase in safety standards and higher emission controls, leading to AZLK's exit from most of Western Europe, Scaldia-Volga's 2140-series Moskvitch cars were distributed only in Belgium and the Netherlands, as well as Italy, which prohibited domestic sales of the Fiat 124-derived VAZ lineup to protect Fiat's own market; sales ended in 1981 after Scaldia-Volga ceased operation in 1980.

The "Balkan" factory assembled the 2140 and 2138 sedans through 1976-1988 and 1976-1980 respectively; the 2140 SL and the station wagons/panel vans were never assembled, though Izh 2715-family panel vans were imported separately as fleet-only vehicles. After 1979, the Bulgarian Moskvitch-2140 used exclusively the UZAM-412D engine; this version has always been explicitly marketed as "Moskvitch-2140D" in Bulgaria and consistently mentioned as such in the paperwork, as opposed to the Soviet legal non-distinction of the two engine variants.

== Gallery ==
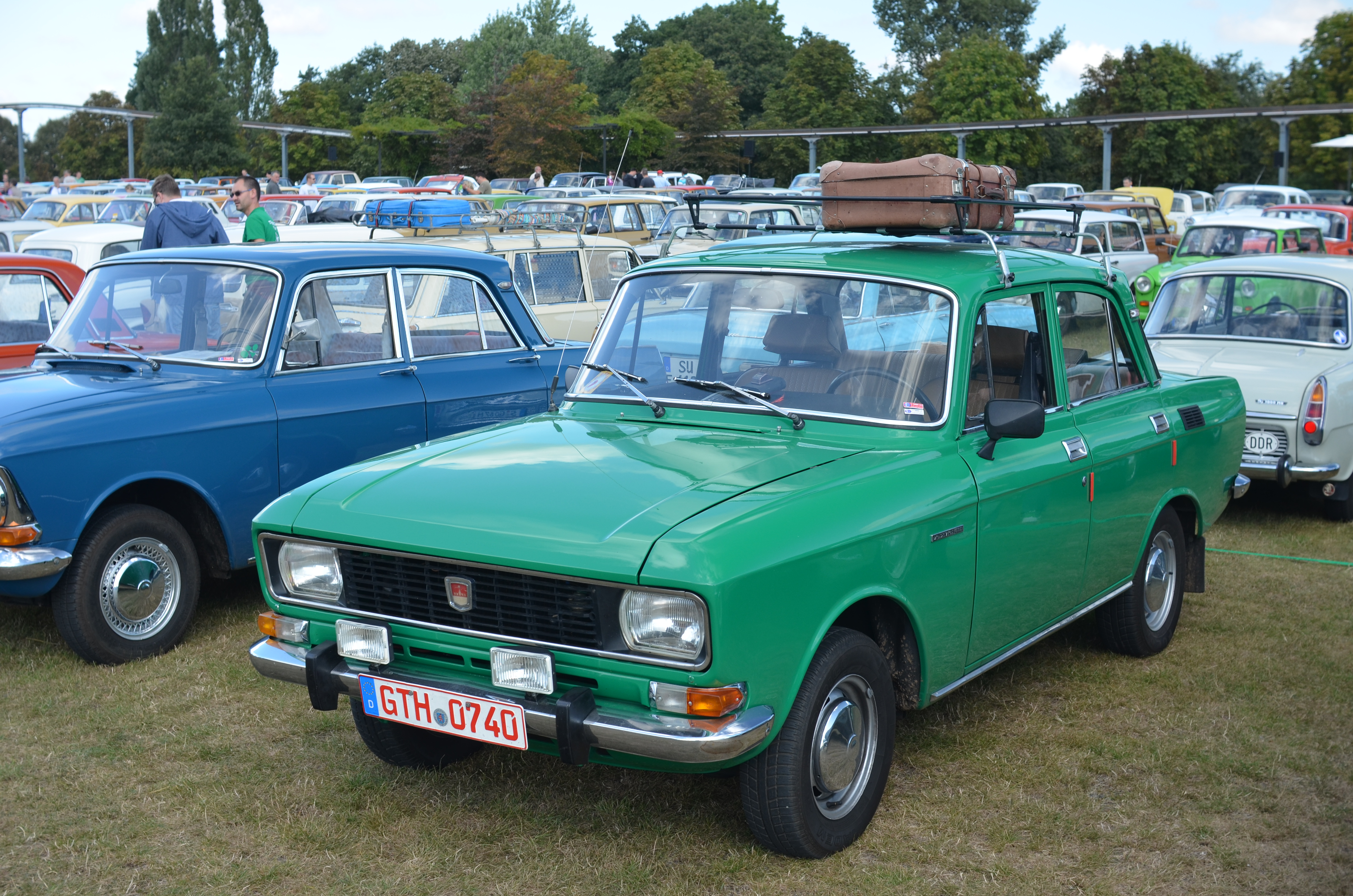
1976-1981 front end design

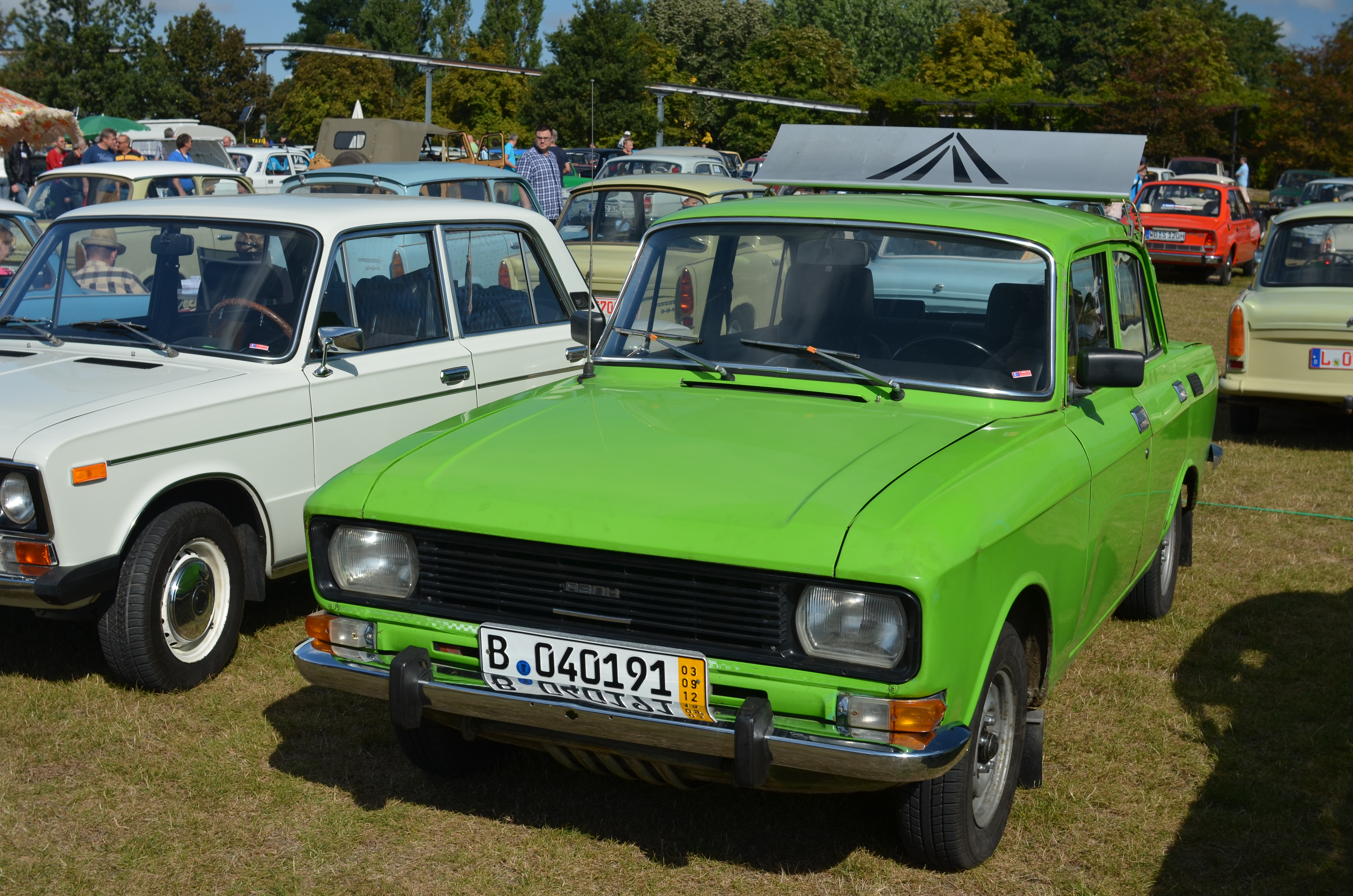
1982-1988 front end design, the chrome trim around the grille was removed and the badge was replaced with "АЗЛК" wordmark

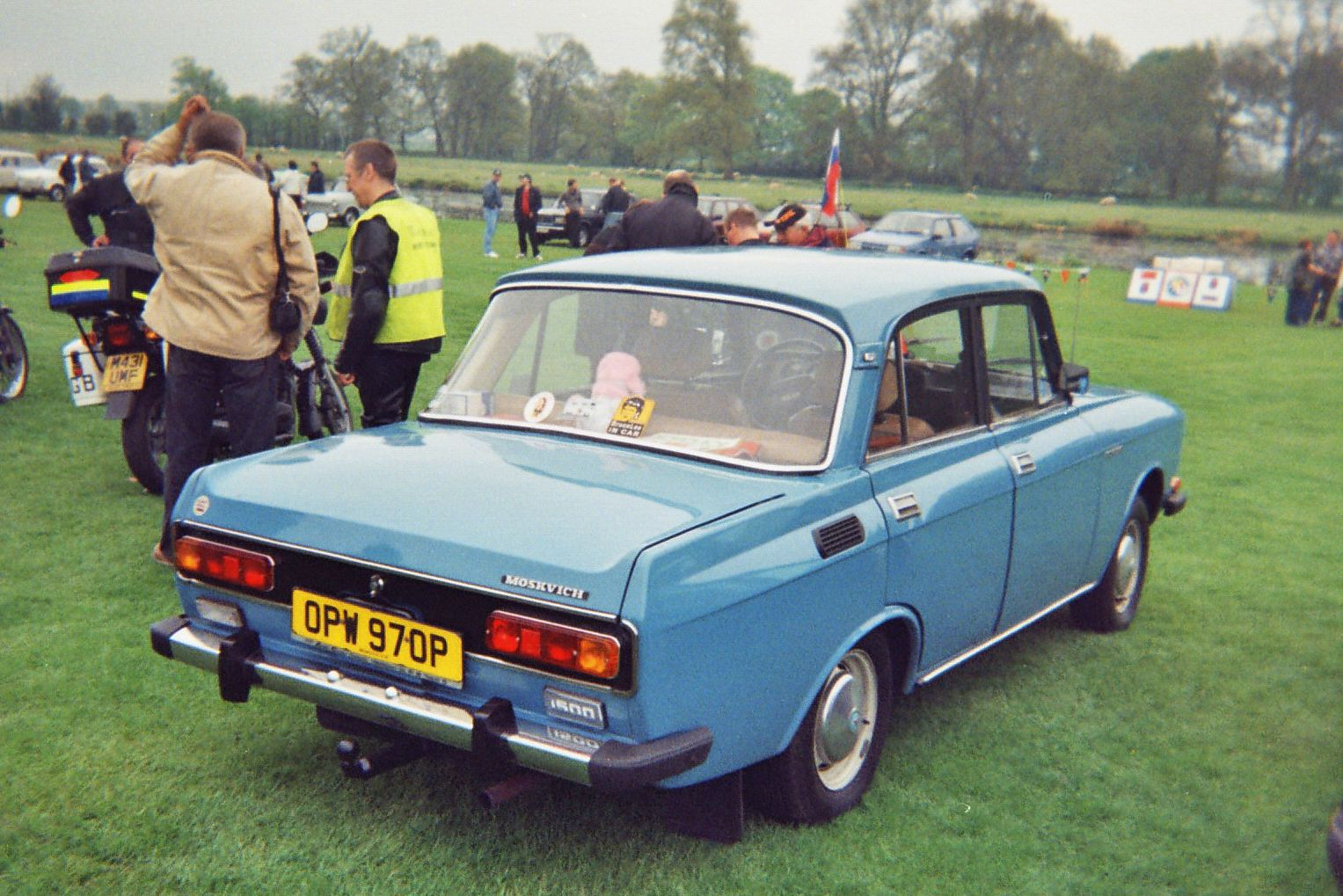
Moskvitch 2140 (UK, grey market left-hand-drive import)

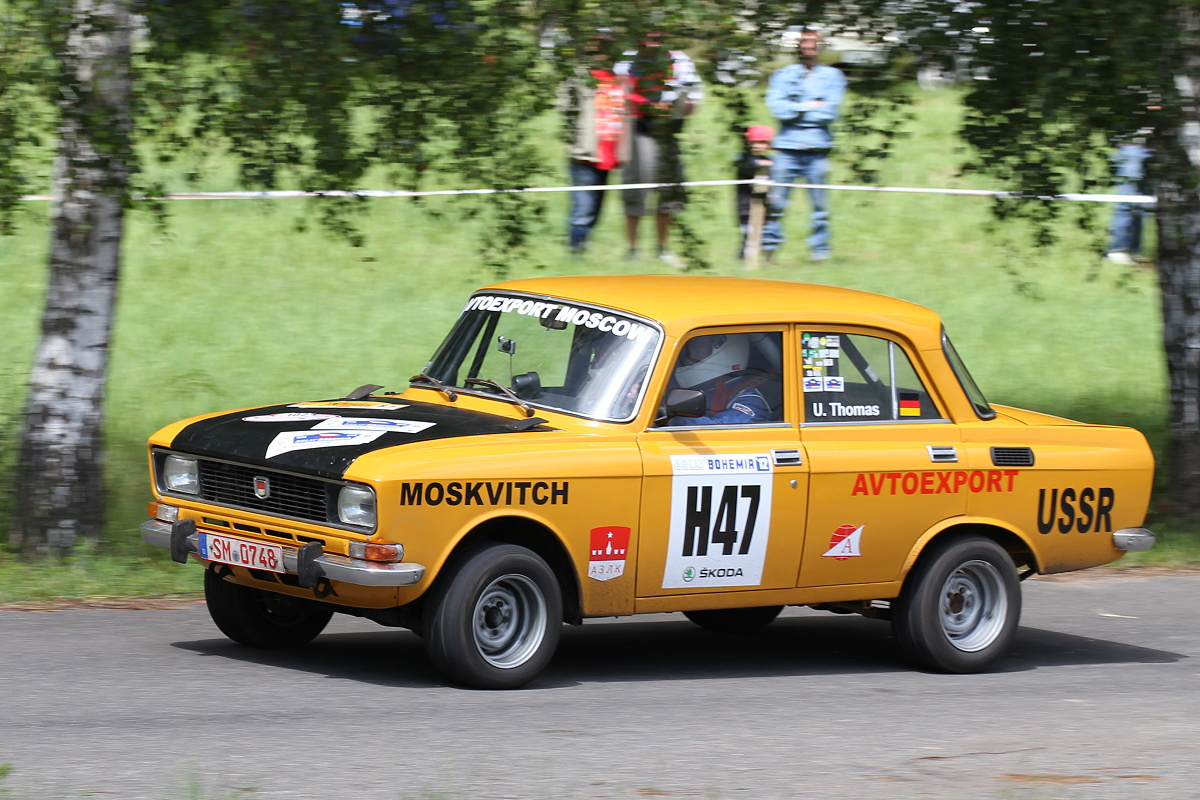
Rally version

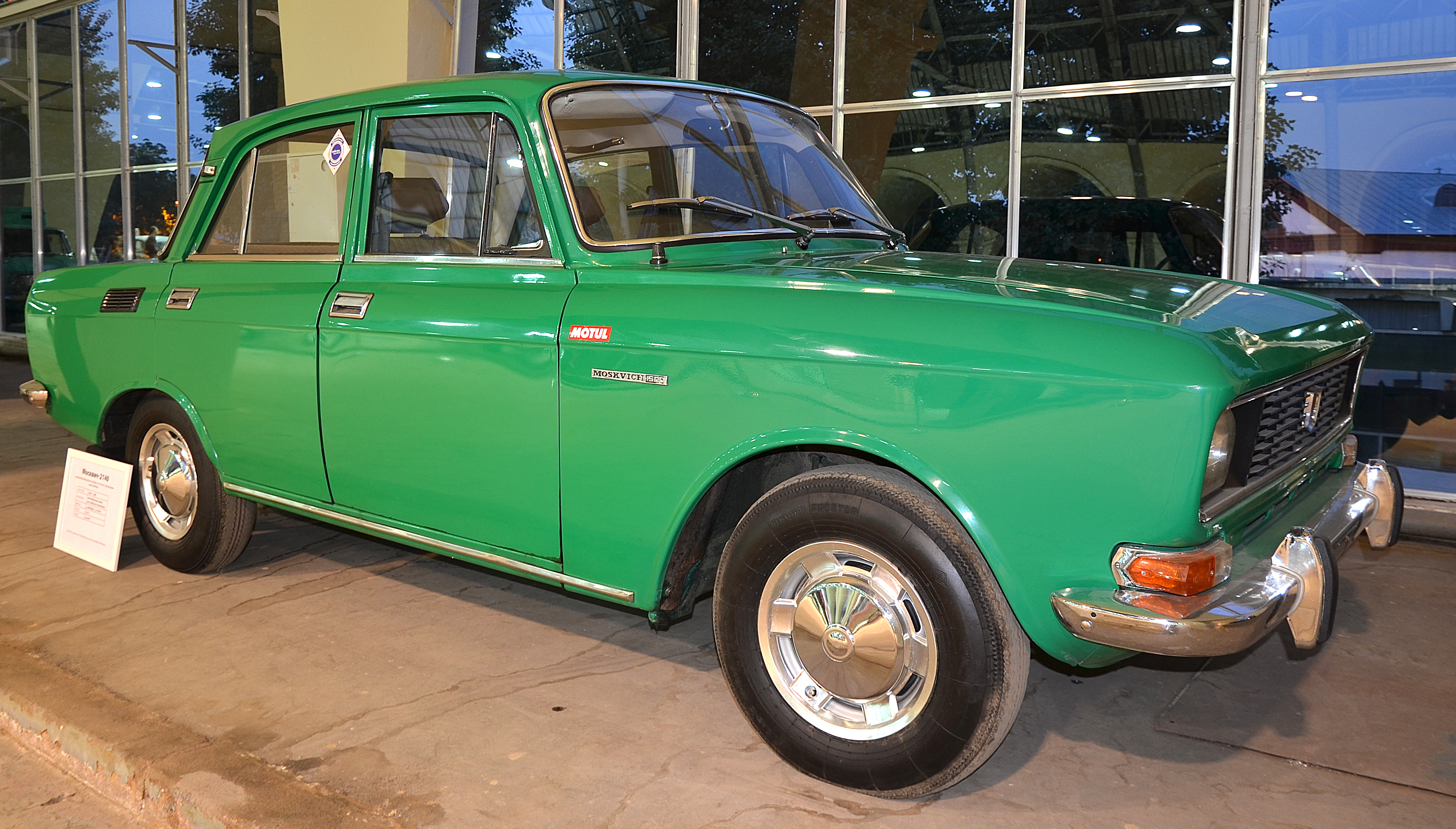
Pre-1982 M-2140 with chrome hubcaps and chrome rocker panel trim

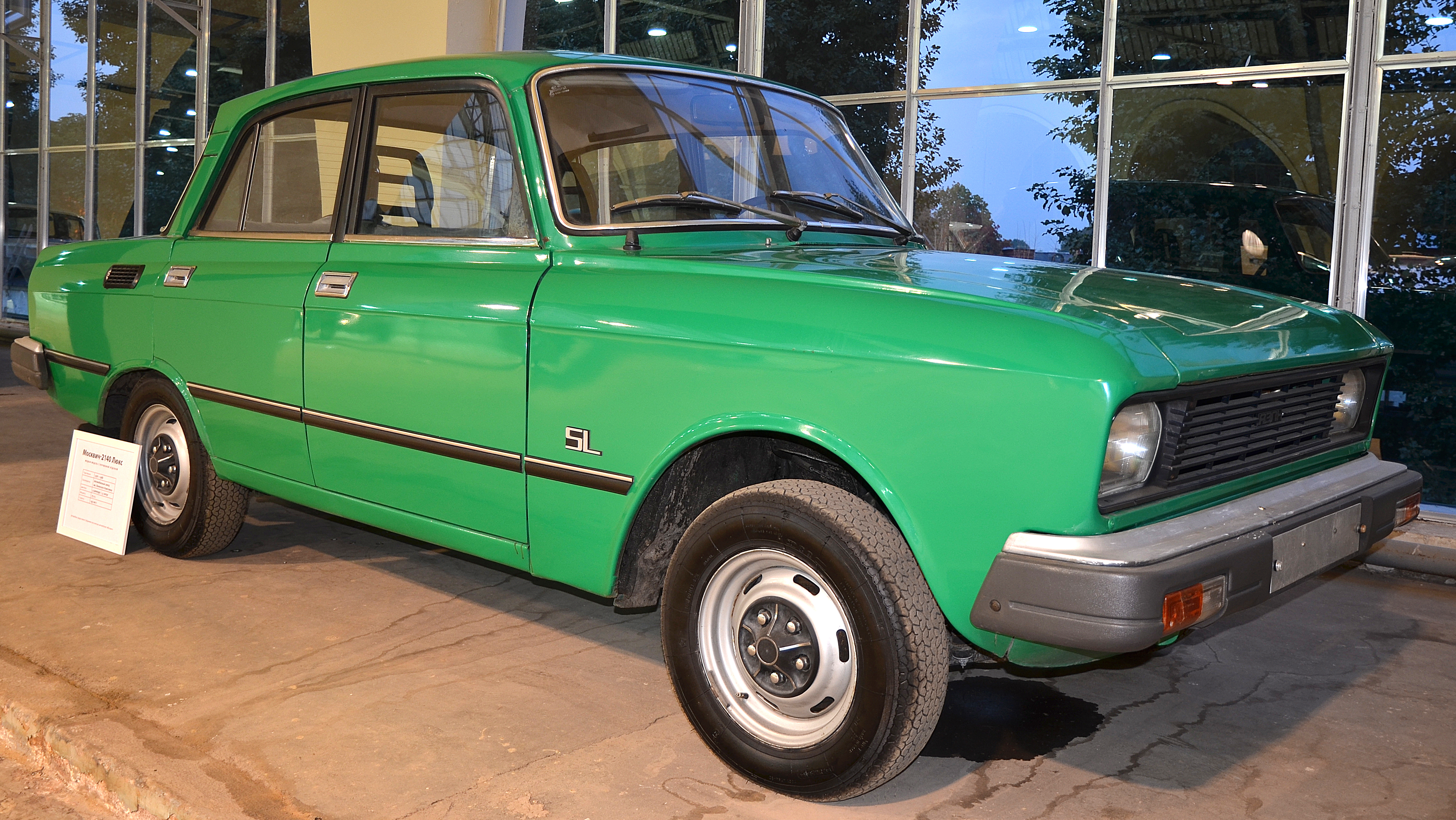
M-2140SL with plastic bumpers and plastic door moldings

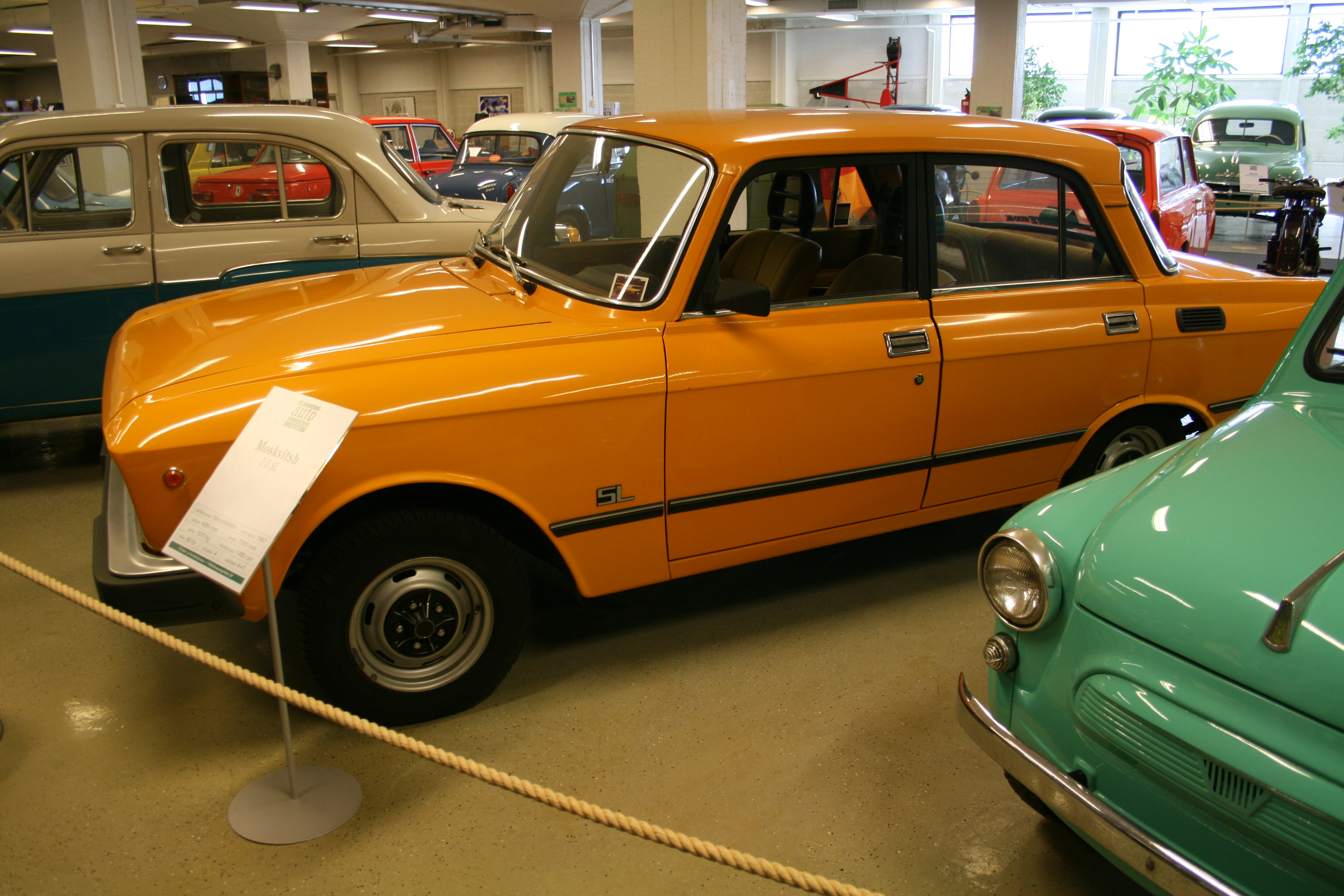
M-2140 SL with plastic door moldings and front door windows without quarter glass vents. Being a Finnish-market export model, this M-2140 SL has turn signal repeaters on front fenders, absent on domestic AZLK-built Moskvitch models since 1973.

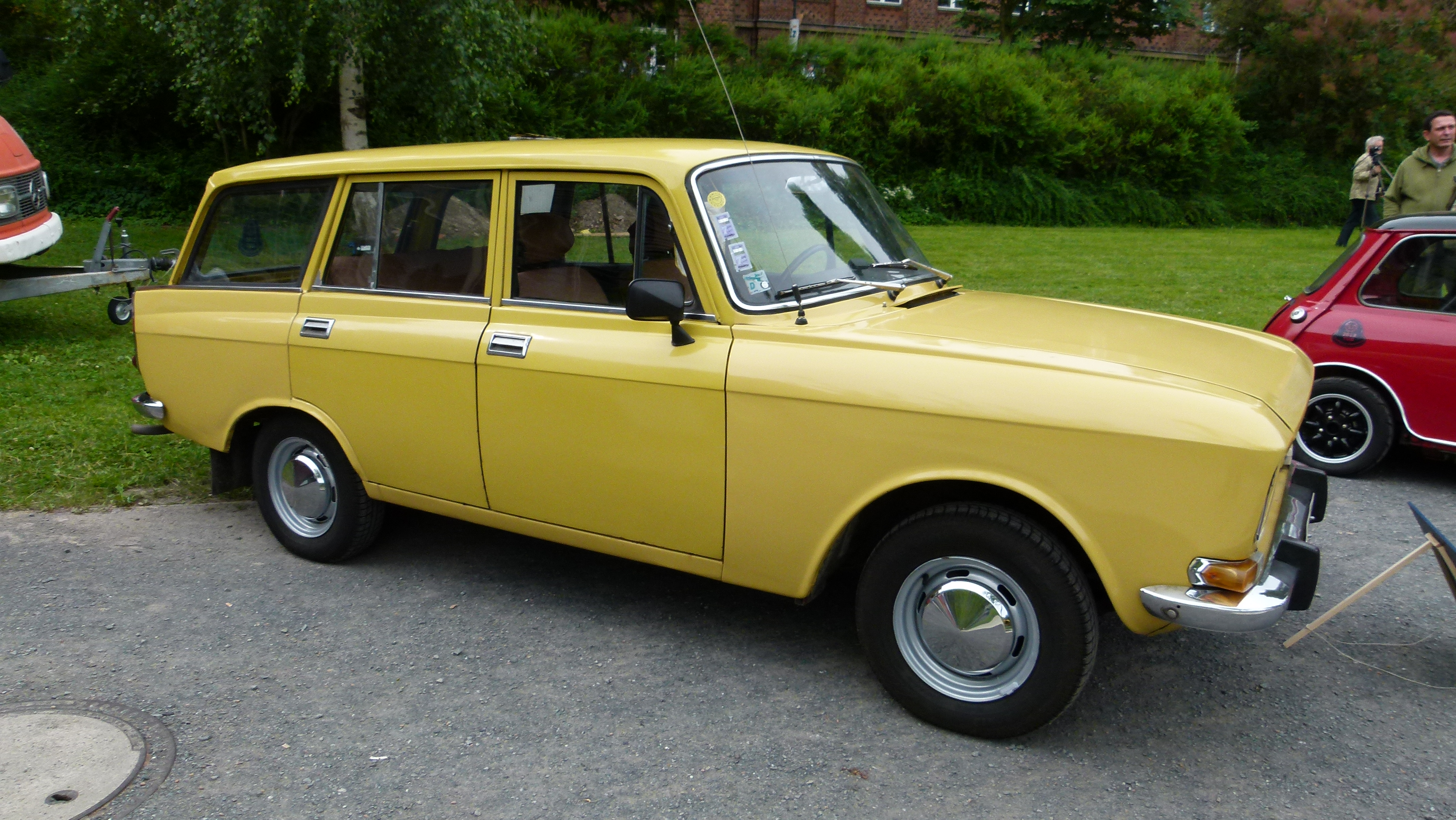
Moskvitch-2137 station wagon

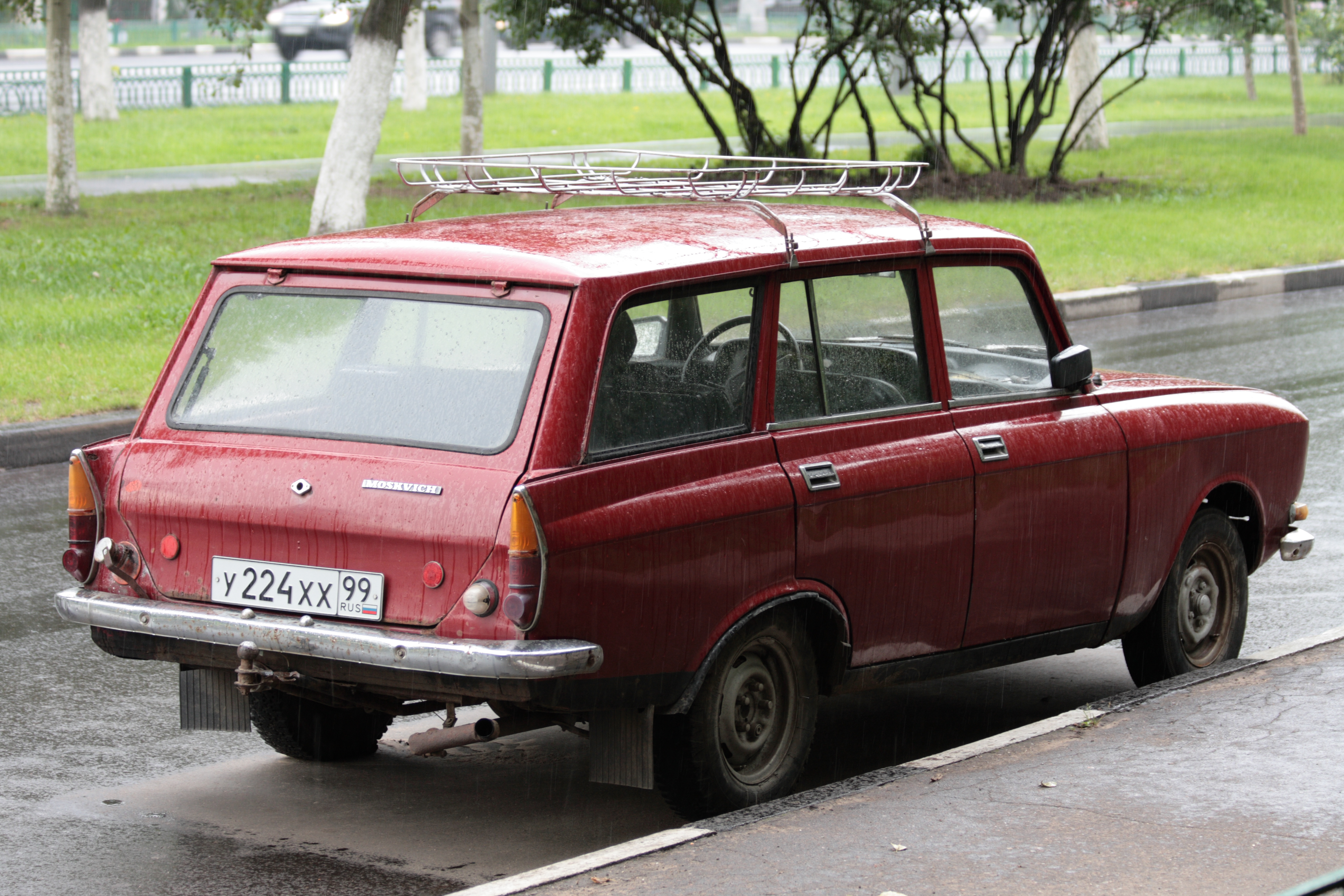
Rear view of the M-2137 wagon, showing tailfins and taillights dating back to 1964
