= Butovo =

Butovo:

- Butovo (area), an area with several settlements known since 16th and 17th centuries
- Butovo (railroad station), a station opened in 1865 of Moscow-Kursk Railway of Moscow Railway
- Butovo memorial complex
- Severnoye Butovo District
- Yuzhnoye Butovo District
- Butovskaya Line
- Butovo (village), several villages in Moscow Region
