= Yema T60 =

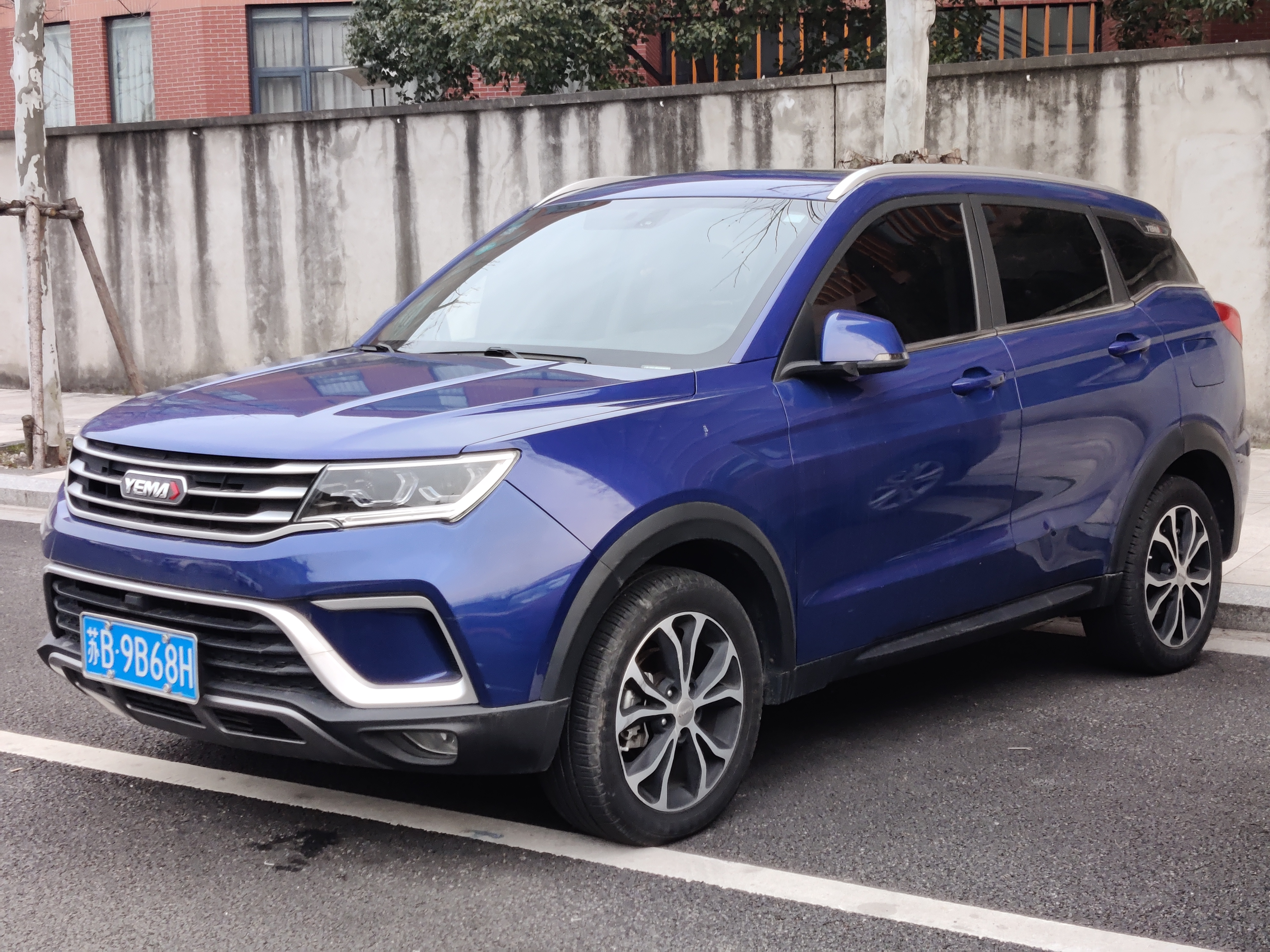

Overview
- Manufacturer: Yema Auto
- Also called: Yema Bojun; Yema EC60 (electric variant); Levdeo i9 Skillas T60 (Iran)
- Production: 2019–2023

Body and chassis
- Class: Subcompact crossover SUV (B)
- Body style: 5-door SUV
- Layout: Front-engine, front-wheel-drive
- Platform: Yema CEEA platform

Powertrain
- Engine: Petrol: 1.5 L turbo I4; 1.5 L I4
- Electric motor: Permanent magnet synchronous motor (EC60/Bojun EV/i9)
- Power output: 82 kW (110 hp; 112 PS) (1.5); 115 kW (154 hp; 156 PS) (1.5 turbo, EC60/Bojun EV/i9)
- Transmission: 5-speed manual CVT; 1-speed direct-drive (EC60/Bojun EV/i9)
- Battery: Li-ion battery: 66 kWh
- Electric range: 400-460 km (248-285 mi) (66 kWh)

Dimensions
- Wheelbase: 2,550 mm (100.4 in)
- Length: 4,360 mm (171.7 in)
- Width: 1,830 mm (72.0 in)
- Height: 1,680 mm (66.1 in)

Chronology
- Predecessor: Yema F-series

The Yema Bojun (Chinese: 博骏; pinyin: Bó jùn) or T60 is a subcompact crossover SUV produced by the Chinese automaker Yema Auto.

== Overview ==
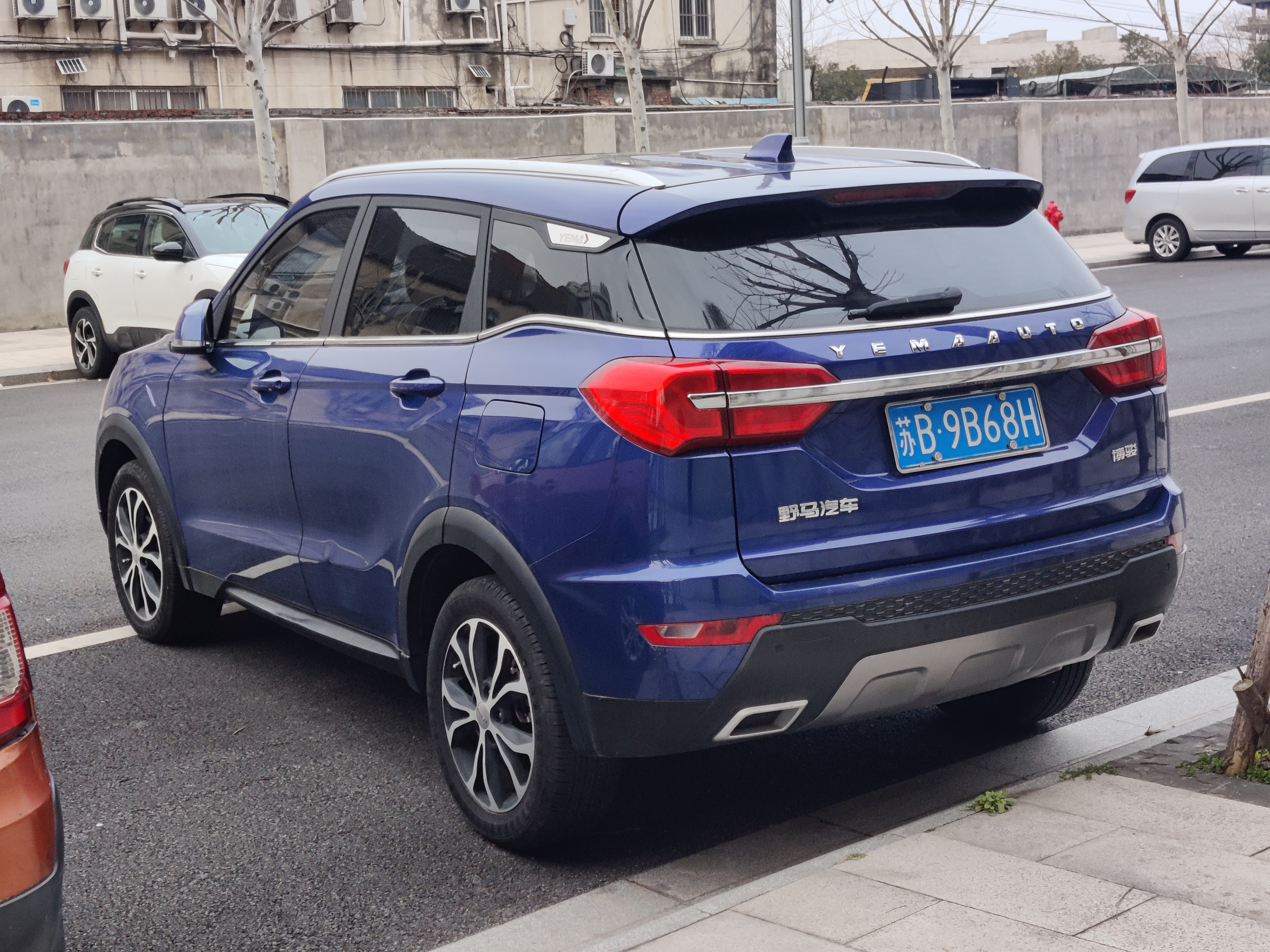
Yema Bojun (rear)

The Bojun was originally planned to be launched as the T60 subcompact crossover sitting below the previously launched Yema T70 compact crossover, and the styling was previewed by the T60 prototype unveiled during the 2017 Shanghai Auto Show.

By December 2018, teasers of the T60 was shown, while Yema Auto was acquired by Levdeo in January 2019, by February 2019, the Yema T60 was confirmed to be named the Bojun for the Chinese domestic market.

== Powertrain ==
Engine options for the Bojun or T60 is a 1.5 liter naturally aspirated engine and a 1.5 liter turbocharged engine. The 1.5 liter engine has a maximum power of 82 kW, peak torque of 145 Nm, mated to a 5-speed manual transmission; maximum power 115 kW of 1.5T engine, peak torque is 215 Nm and mated to a CVT gearbox.

== EC60 ==
The Yema EC60, also known as the Yema Bojun EV, is the electric variant of the T60 or Bojun. Levdeo also sells their own rebadged version as the Levdeo i9.

The EC60 is powered by a 115 kW/270N.m electric motor and a 66kWh lithium battery, good for a 105 km/h top speed. According to officials, the EC60 is offered with two variants, with NEDC maximum cruising range of 248 miles (400 km) and 285 miles (460 km) respectively.

== Styling controversies ==
The Yema Bojun is controversial in terms of styling. Despite being significantly smaller and sitting in a lower segment, the Yema Bojun heavily resembles the Geely Boyue or Proton X70, and even the Bojun name was made to sound similar to Boyue.
