= JAC Refine L6 MAX =

Large MPV

JAC Refine M6
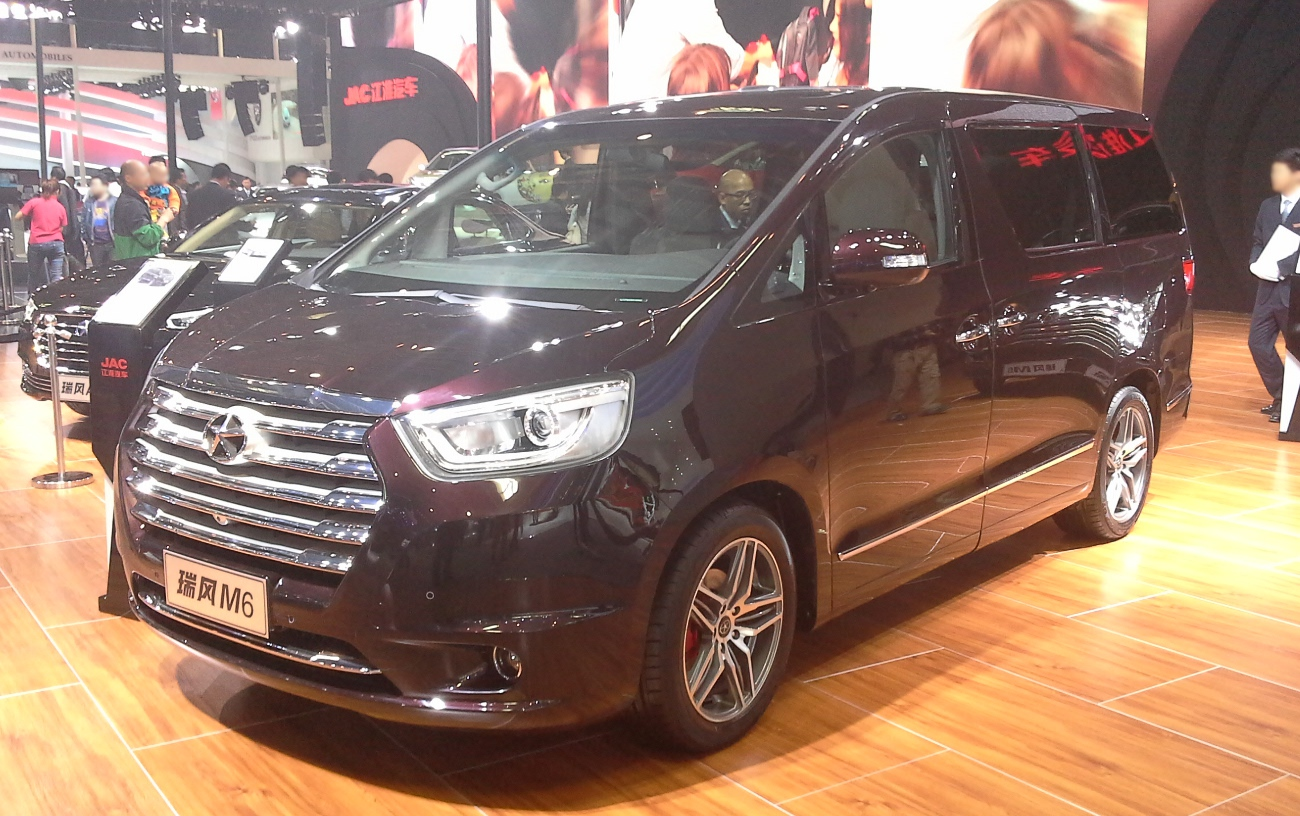
- JAC Refine M6 (pre-facelift)

Overview
- Manufacturer: JAC Group
- Also called: JAC Refine M6 MAX (long wheel base model); JAC Refine L6 MAX (facelift as of 2020)
- Production: 2017–2025
- Model years: 2018–2026
- Assembly: China: Hefei

Body and chassis
- Class: Large MPV (M)
- Body style: 5-door minivan

Powertrain
- Engine: 2.0 L HFC4GA3-4D turbo I4
- Transmission: 6-speed DCT

Dimensions
- Wheelbase: 116 in (2,950 mm); 126 in (3,200 mm) (M6 MAX/L6 MAX)
- Length: 197 in (5,005 mm); 207 in (5,255 mm) (M6 MAX/L6 MAX)
- Width: 73 in (1,850 mm)
- Height: 78 in (1,970 mm)

The JAC Refine M6 is a large MPV produced by Chinese auto maker JAC Group from 2017 to 2025. The Refine M6 was debuted during the 2013 Shanghai Auto Show as a pre-production model.

== Overview ==
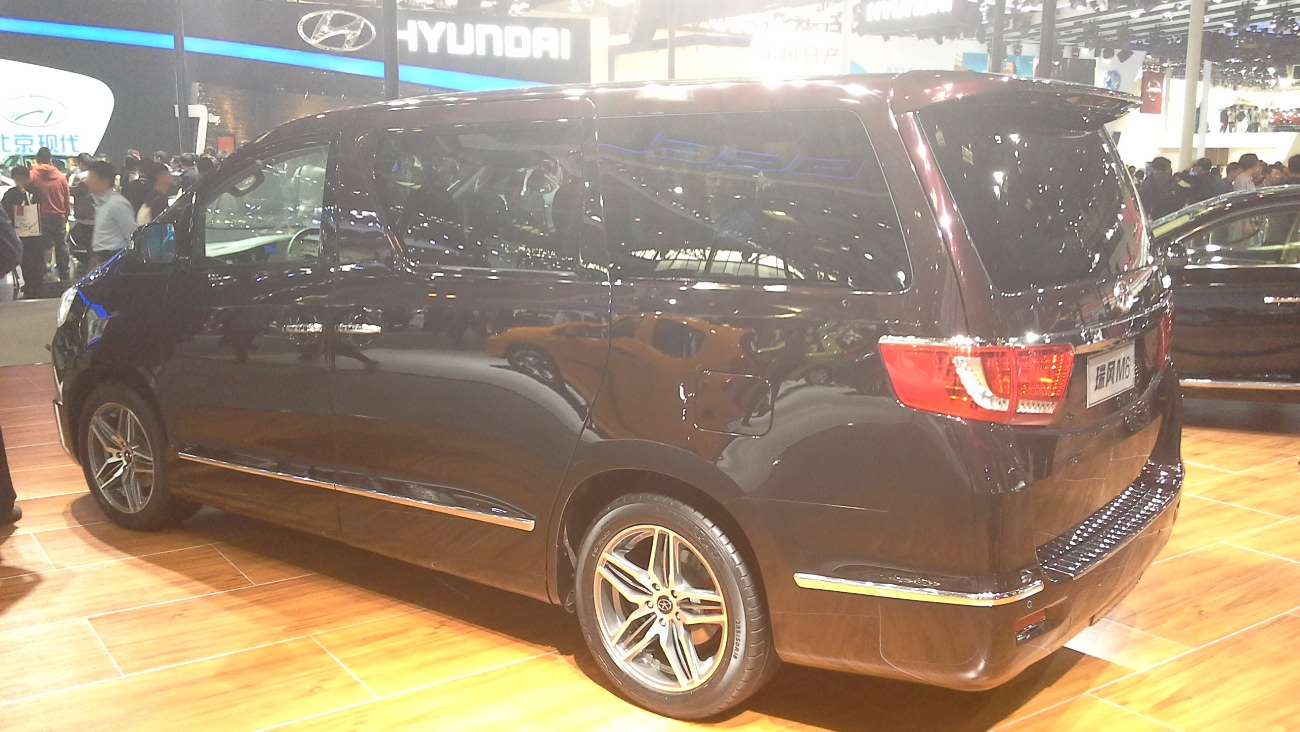
Rear view

The Refine M6 was originally revealed in 2013 during Auto Shanghai, but the market launch happened 4 years later in 2017, and by then the M6 has already received a facelift. Despite its dimensions being smaller than the Refine M4, it is the most premium of the Refine series, sitting above the Refine M3, Refine M4, and Refine M5 making it the flagship of the Refine series. According to the official website, pricing for the Refine M4 ranges from 239,500 to 349,500 yuan, positioning the Refine M6 above the Refine M5.

The Refine M6 is powered by a 2.0 liter turbo engine producing 190 hp and mated to a 6-speed DCT with a fuel consumption of 10.4L/100km.

=== Design controversies ===
The body design of the Refine M6 is heavily inspired by the second generation Toyota Alphard. However, this MPV has the same luxury level as Toyota Alphard, with high-technology facilities inside its interior such as digital TV or smart air conditioning system.

== Market launch and facelift ==
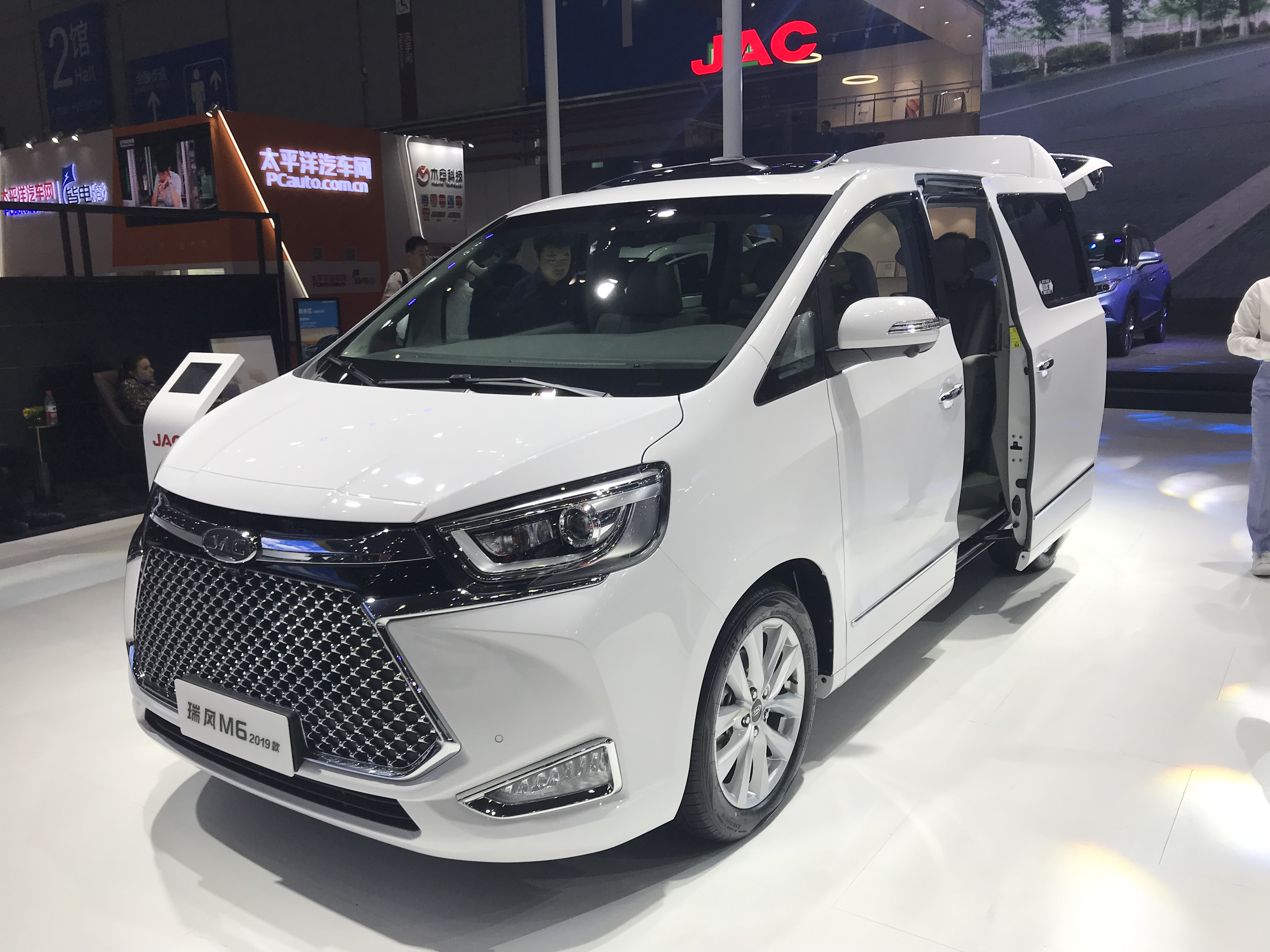
JAC Refine M6 2017 (facelift)

A facelift was revealed at the market launch in 2017, mainly updating the grilles, placing the Refine M6 more inline with the other JAC Refine products.

Another update was revealed in 2019, featuring the exact same exterior design and powertrain. In terms of configuration, the 2019 facelift features a center console 8-inch screen, double side power sliding door, camera for panoramic image, parking radar, tire pressure monitoring, front seat heating, and anti-glare center rear view mirror. The top of the trim model also provides electric rear sunroof, second row independent first class seats, front side airbags, side air curtains, electric tailgates, air purification system, and a 10.1 inch ceiling-mounted screen.

== JAC Refine M6 MAX/L6 MAX ==
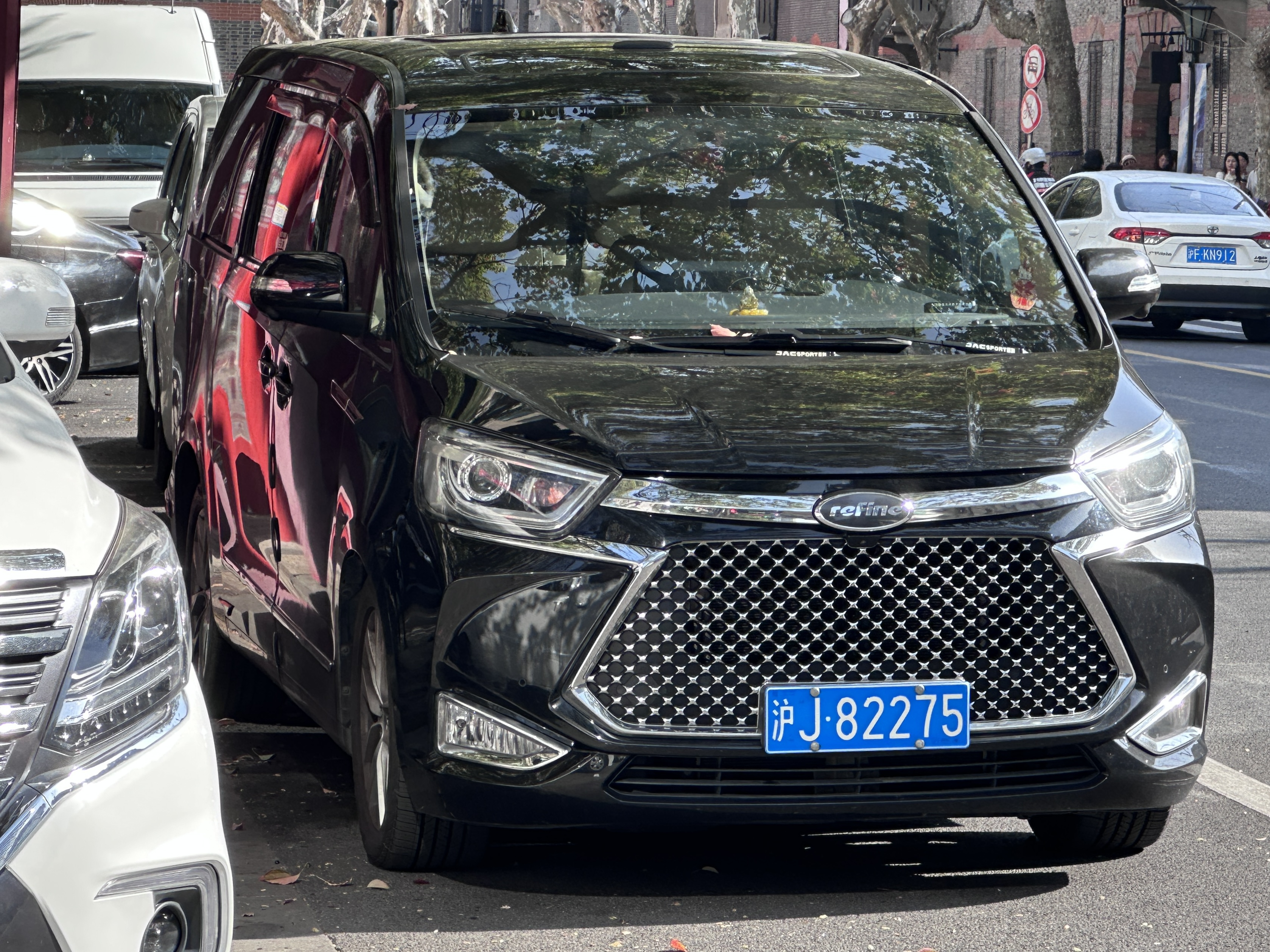
JAC Refine L6 MAX

Based on the 2017 facelift model, as the JAC Refine M6 MAX was revealed during the 2020 Beijing Auto Show as the long wheelbase variant of the Refine M6, adding an extra 250mm to the length with all the added length between the axles. The Refine M6 MAX is powered by a 2.0 liter turbo engine producing a maximum output of 135kW (184hp) and 290 N·m mated to a 6-speed DCT. Despite being revealed in October 2020 via the postponed Beijing Auto Show, the large MPV was renamed as the JAC Refine L6 MAX in November 2020 for the 2020 Guangzhou Auto Show. Compared to previous models, the Refine L6 MAX features a Refine logo instead of the usual JAC badge.

== See also ==
Chinese-made Alphard clones:

- Joylong iFly - Second Chinese-made Alphard clone in 2014.
- Yema Spica - Third Chinese-made Alphard clone in 2015.

Original Japanese-made Alphard:

- Toyota Alphard
