= Yema Spica =

Chinese minivan

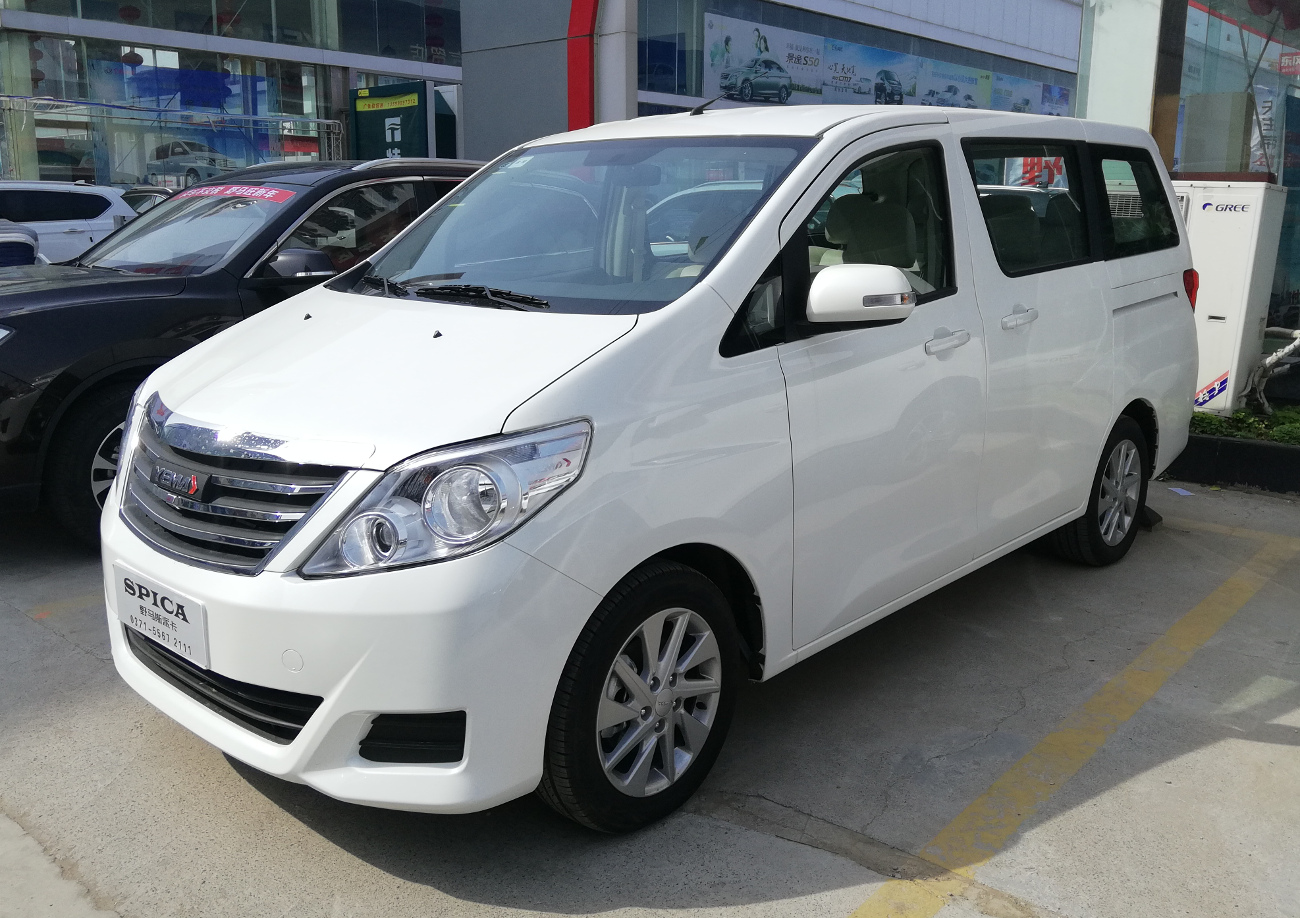
- Yema Spica

Overview
- Also called: Yema M302
- Production: 2015–2023
- Assembly: China
- Designer: Hideyuki Iwata (Alphard)

Powertrain
- Engine: 1.5 L GE15 I4
- Transmission: 5-speed manual

Dimensions
- Wheelbase: 2,800 mm (110 in)
- Length: 4,580 mm (180 in)
- Width: 1,730 mm (68 in)
- Height: 1,850 mm (73 in)
- Curb weight: 1,435 kg (3,164 lb)

The Yema Spica (斯派卡) is a minivan produced by the Chinese automaker Yema Auto from 2015 to 2023.

== Overview ==
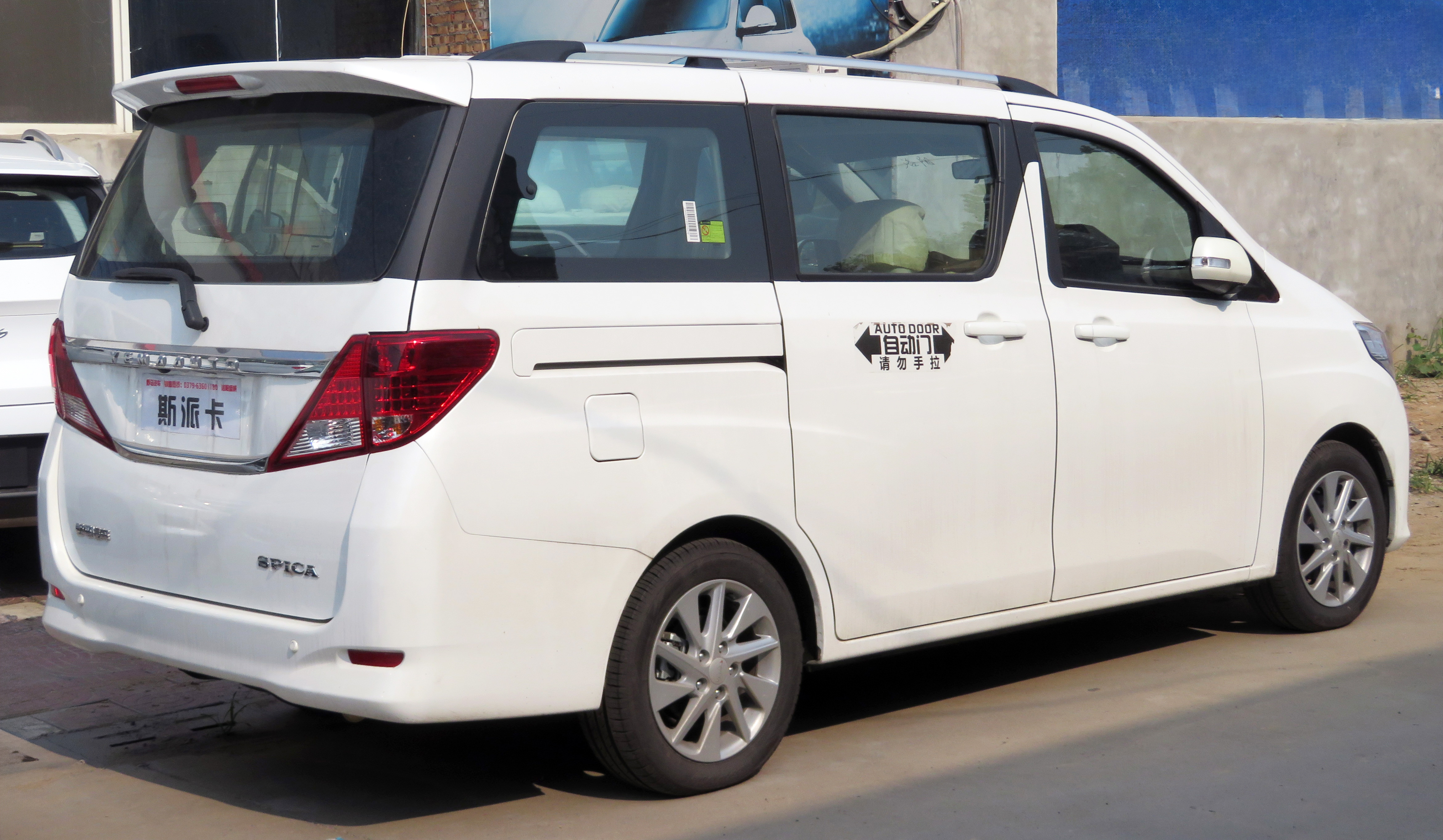
Rear view

Originally known as the Yema M302 before launch, the Yema minivan was revealed during the 2015 Chengdu Auto Show in China.

The styling of the Yema Spica is especially controversial as the whole vehicle appears to be reverse engineered from the second generation Toyota Alphard. Like the Alphard, the Yema Spica is marketed as an MPV for chauffeur business while primarily made for the Chinese market.

Unlike the Alphard's engine (2.4–3.5 liters), the Spica has a 1.5-liter engine. Prices of the Spica ranges from 59,800 yuan to 75,800 yuan.

== See also ==
=== Chinese-made Alphard clones ===
- Refine M6 - First Chinese-made Alphard clone in 2013.
- Joylong iFly - Third Chinese-made Alphard clone in 2014.

=== Original Japanese-made Alphard ===
- Toyota Alphard
