= Yema Auto =

Chinese automobile manufacturer

Sichuan Yema Automobile Co., Ltd.
- Trade name: Yema
- Industry: Automobile
- Predecessor: Sichuan Automobile Industry Co., Ltd.
- Founded: 1994 (vehicle production)
- Fate: Acquired by Levdeo until 2023
- Headquarters: Chengdu, Sichuan, People's Republic of China
- Area served: Worldwide
- Key people: Ajitomi, Yasufune
- Products: Automobiles, SUVs
- Website: www.yemaglobal.com (defunct)

Sichuan Yema Automobile Co., Ltd.
- Traditional Chinese: 四川野马汽车股份有限公司
- Simplified Chinese: 四川野马汽车股份有限公司
Transcriptions
Standard Mandarin
- Hanyu Pinyin: Sìchuān Qìchē Gōngyè Gǔfèn Yǒuxiàn Gōngsī
- Wade–Giles: Szŭ^{4}-ch'uan^{1} Ch'i^{4}-ch'ê^{1} Kung^{1}-yeh^{4} Ku^{3}-fen^{4} Yuh^{3}-sien^{4} Kung^{1}-szŭ^{1}
Yue: Cantonese
- Jyutping: Sei3 cyun1 hei3 ce1 gung1 jip6 gu2 fan6 jau5 haan6 gung1 si1

Yema
- Traditional Chinese: 野馬
- Simplified Chinese: 野马
- Literal meaning: wild horse
Transcriptions
Standard Mandarin
- Hanyu Pinyin: Yěmǎ
- Wade–Giles: Yeh^{3}-ma^{3}
- IPA: [ji̯ɛ̀mà]
Yue: Cantonese
- Yale Romanization: Yéhmáh
- Jyutping: Je5 maa5

Sichuan Yema Automobile Co., Ltd. is a Chinese automobile manufacturer which has built buses and automobiles under the Yema brand since 2002. The company was founded in the 1980s. In January 2019, Yema Auto was acquired by Levdeo, a Chinese low-speed electric vehicle company that produces neighborhood electric vehicles.

== Development ==
Yema Auto has three manufacturing bases located separately in Chengdu and Mianyang: the Chengdu HQ, Chengdu New Energy Branch and Mianyang Branch. The Chengdu HQ includes Chengdu Passenger Vehicle Co. and Chengdu Bus Co., where coaches, commuter buses, city buses, passenger vehicles (SUVs and MPVs) and new energy vehicles are made. In September 2002, with the approval of the Chengdu Municipal Government, Sichuan Fulin Industrial Group Co., Ltd. implemented an overall merger and reorganization, and was listed as a key automobile manufacturing enterprise in the "Eleventh Five-Year Plan" of Sichuan Province and Chengdu Municipal People's Government.

In August 2006, it was officially renamed Sichuan Automobile Industry Group Co., Ltd.

In 2011, Sichuan Automobile Industry Co., Ltd. was established through share reorganization.

In 2012, the Yema Automobile New Energy Branch was established, and the Sichuan New Energy Automobile Industry Research Institute was jointly established with Zhongneng Dongdao Group.

In 2014, the new logo was officially launched. The Mianyang Branch is located in Mianyang Hi-tech Industrial Development Zone, covering an area of around 1.3 million square meters, with total investment of over 3 billion RMB. It has established a first-rate-equipped manufacturing base with four complete vehicle-production processes of multi-vehicle & full automation production lines for both traditional and new energy vehicles in the year of 2014. In April 2015, it was renamed "Sichuan Yema Automobile Co., Ltd."

As of January 2019, Levdeo acquired Yema Auto and revealed plans to strategically reorganized it, launching electric vehicles built on existing Yema gasoline vehicle platforms under the newly launched Letin brand. Since Levdeo declared bankruptcy in May 2023, Yema Auto also fell into crisis.

In 2023, Yema Auto was filed for bankruptcy review twice.

== Models ==
Non production

- SQJ6480 Estate (prototype only)
- SQJ6485 Estate SUV (prototype only)

Van

- SQJ6450/6450N (Austin Maestro van)

MPV

- Spica (MPV, shaped like the Toyota Alphard)

CUV

- SQJ6451/F99 (Subaru Forester lookalike)
- F10 (Subaru Forester lookalike with an Audi-style grille)
- F12 (Subaru Forester lookalike with a Kia-style front end)
- F16 (Subaru Forester lookalike with a slightly different Kia-style front end)
- T60 (博骏) (Since 2018)
- T70 (Compact CUV, with 1.5T, 1.8L and 1.8T of displacement)
- T80 (Mid-size CUV)

New Energy Vehicle (NEV)

- Mango (City car)
- EC70 (Electric CUV based on the T70)
- EC60 (Electric compact CUV based on the T60)
- EC30 (Electric MPV based on the Spica)
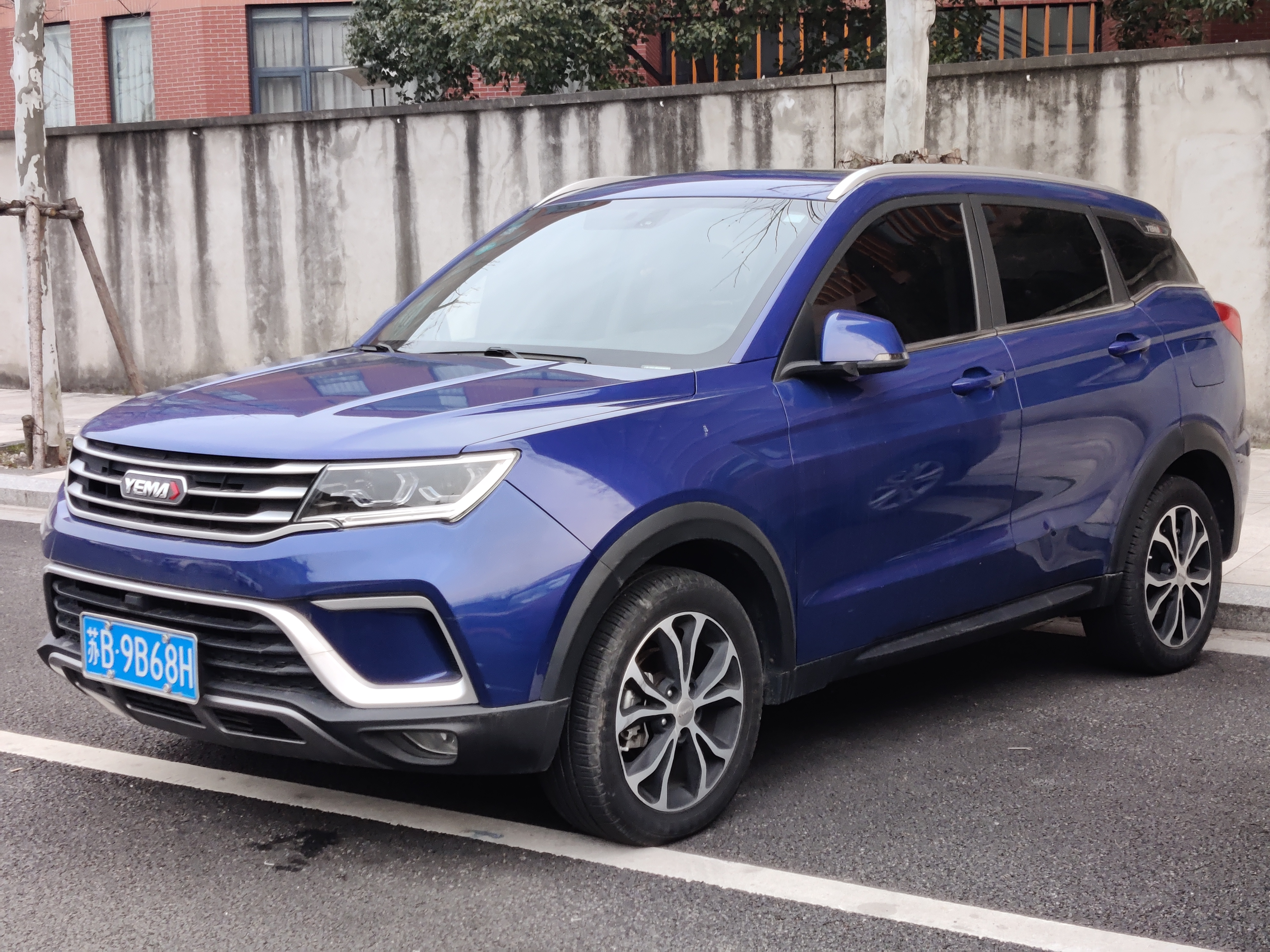
Yema Bojun

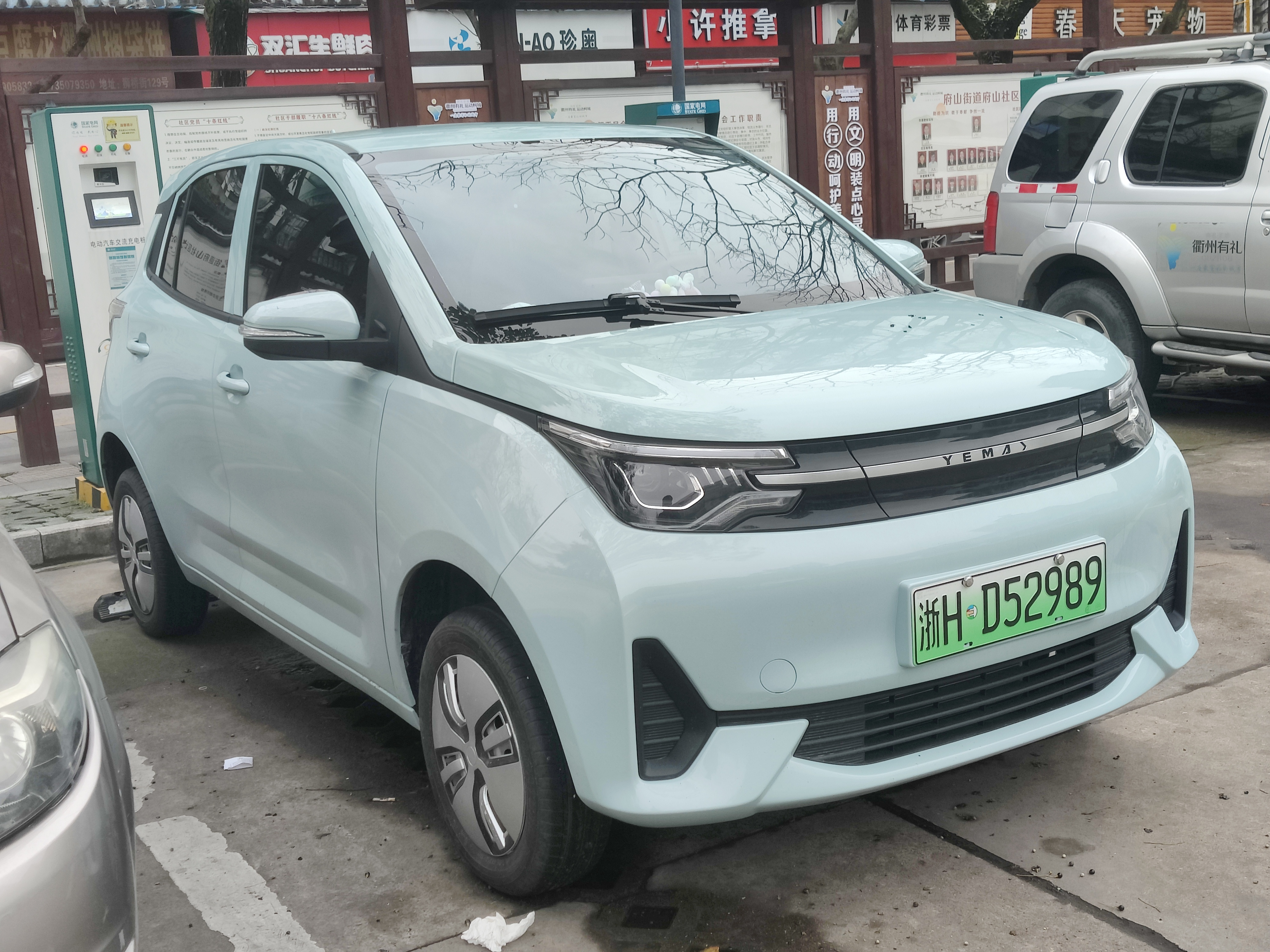
Yema Letin Mango

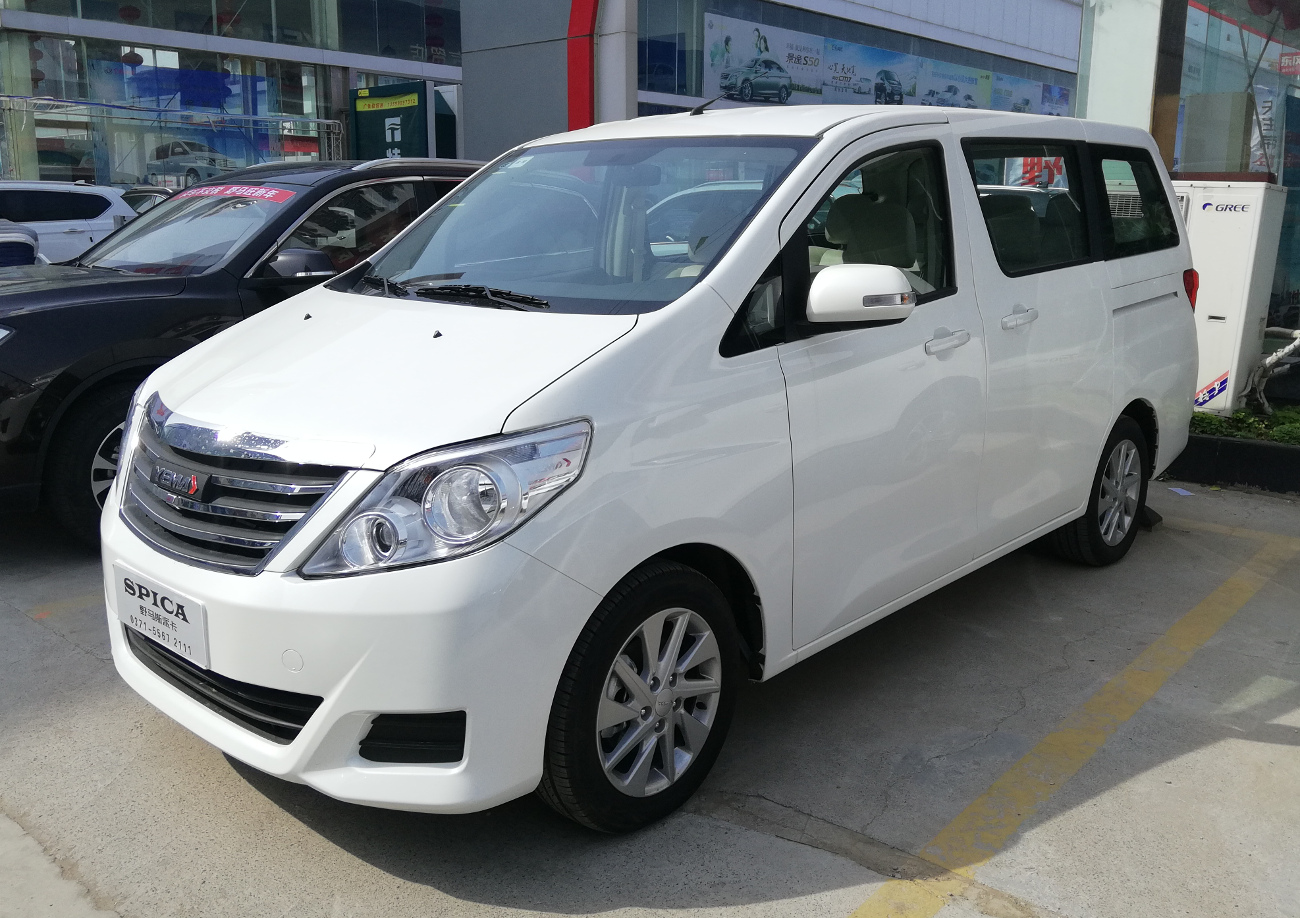
Yema Spica

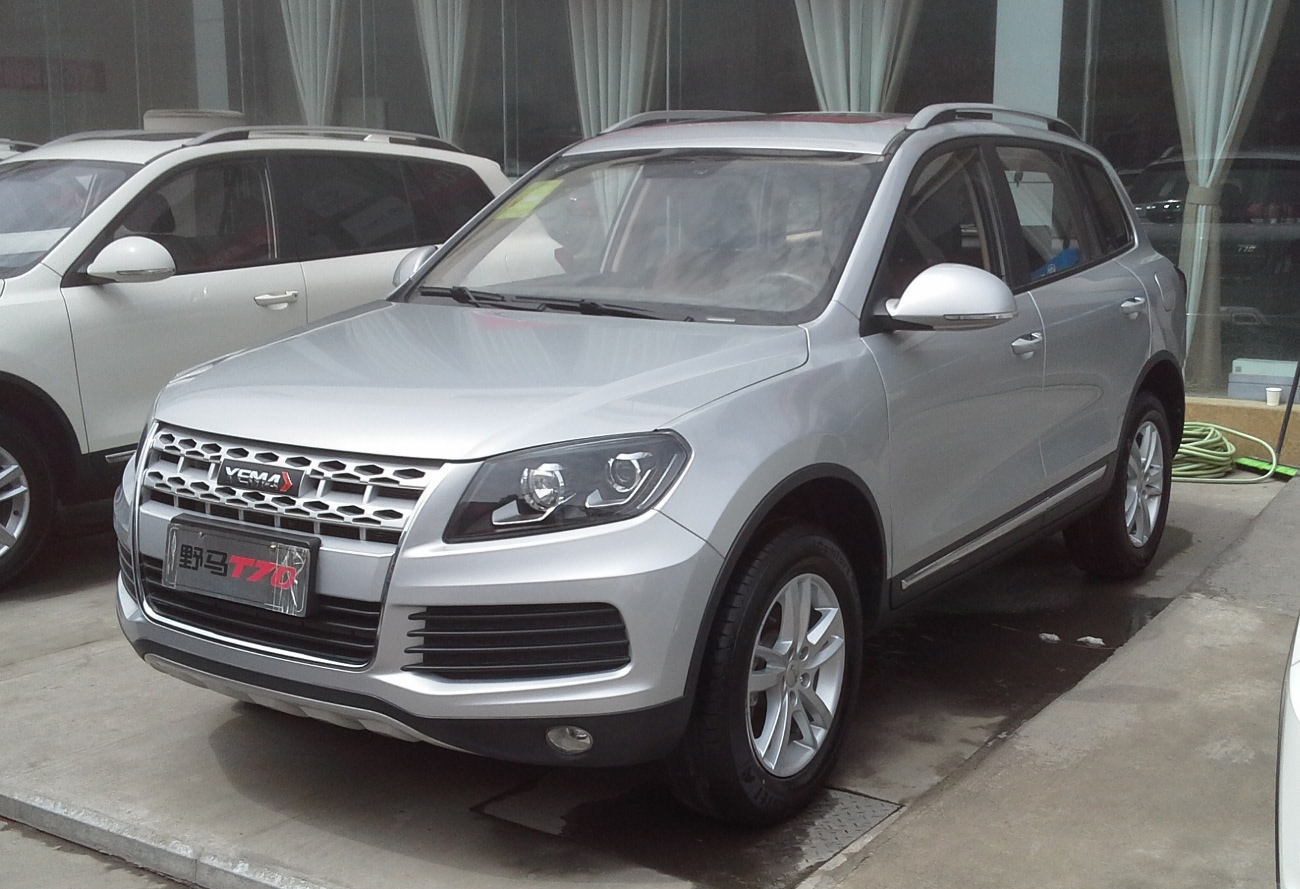
Yema T70

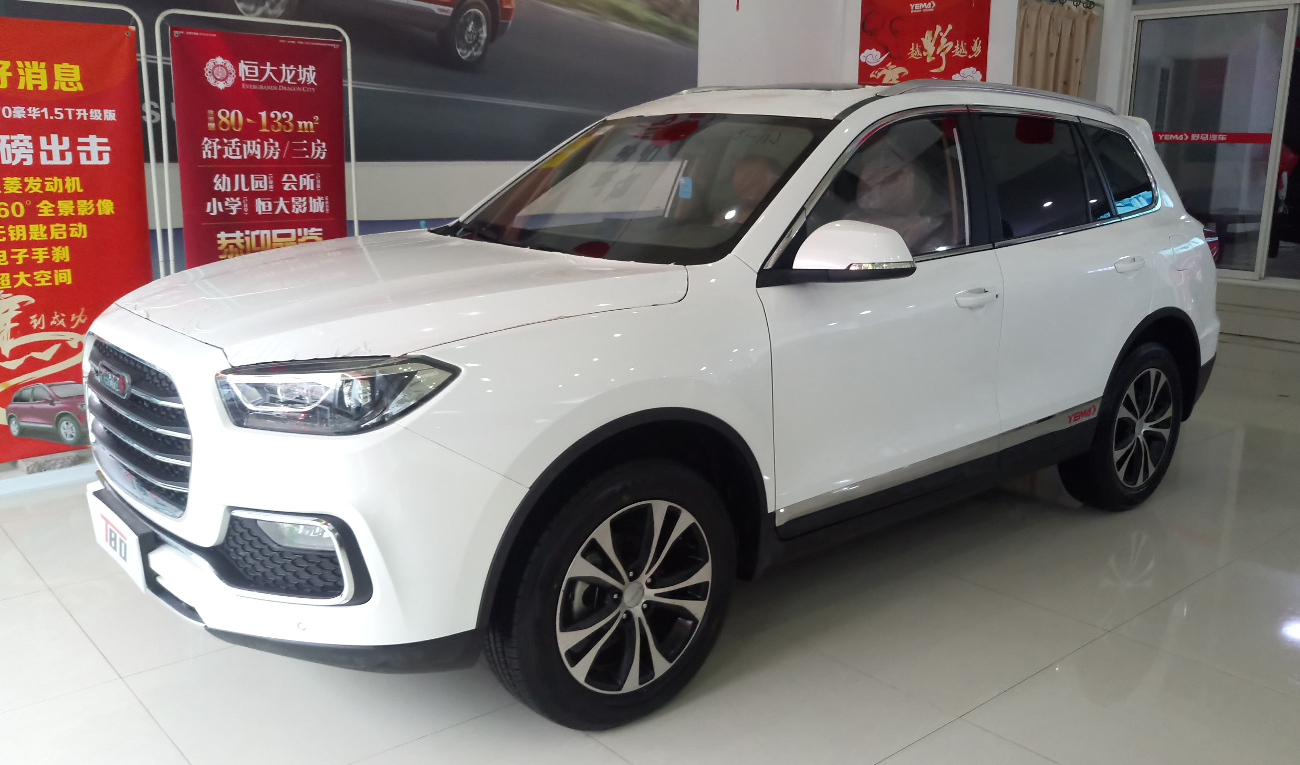
Yema T80

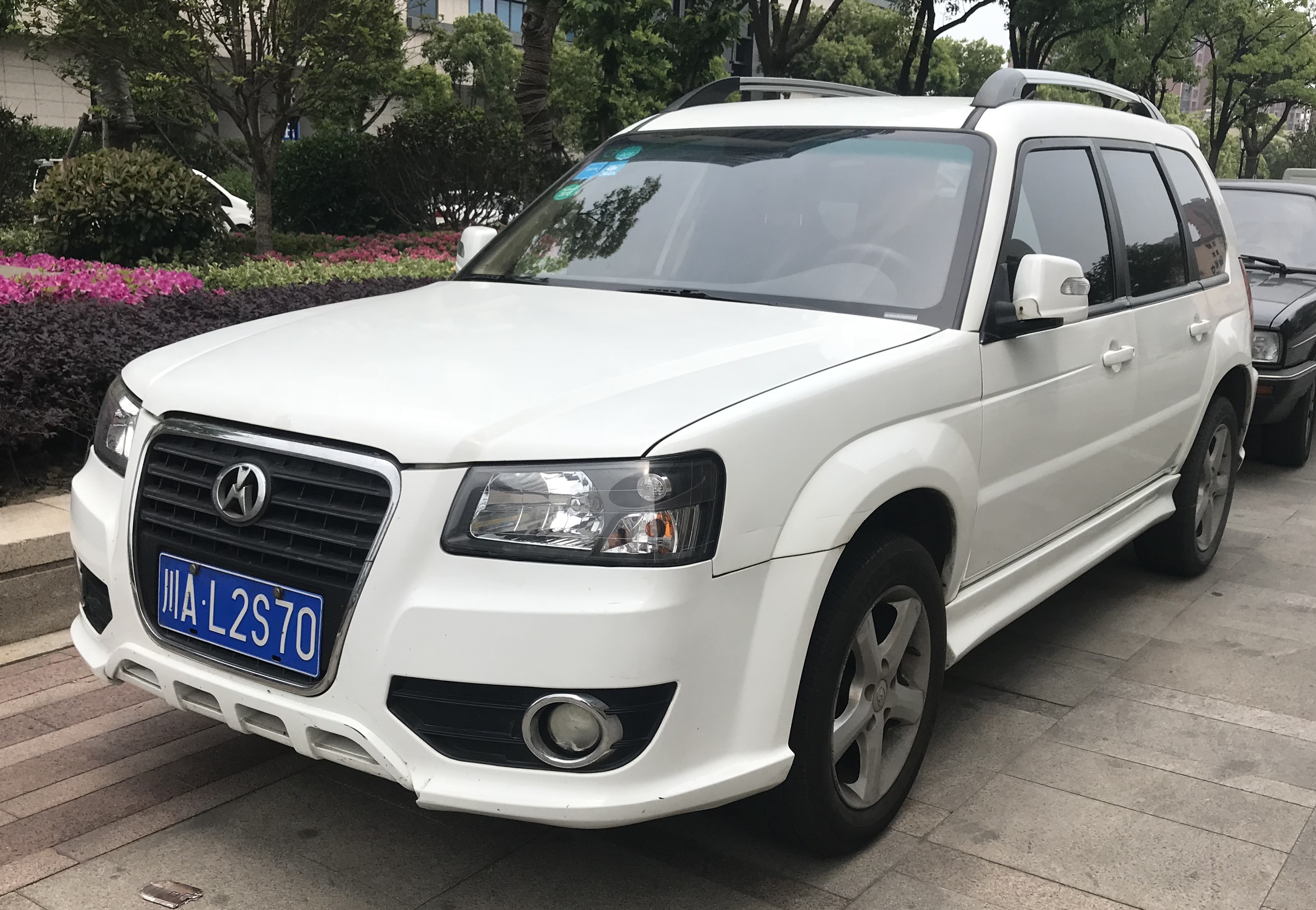
Yema F10

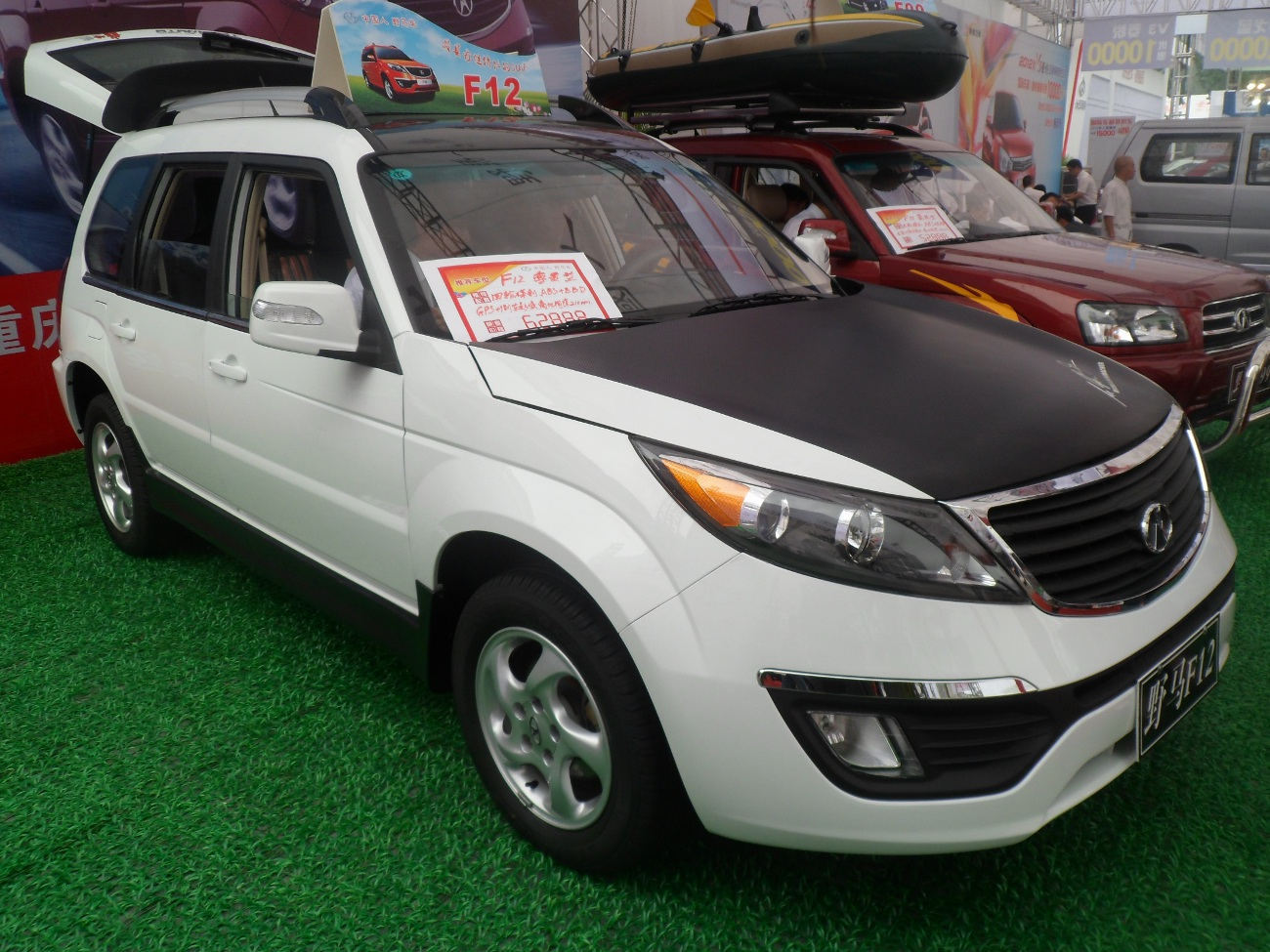
Yema F12

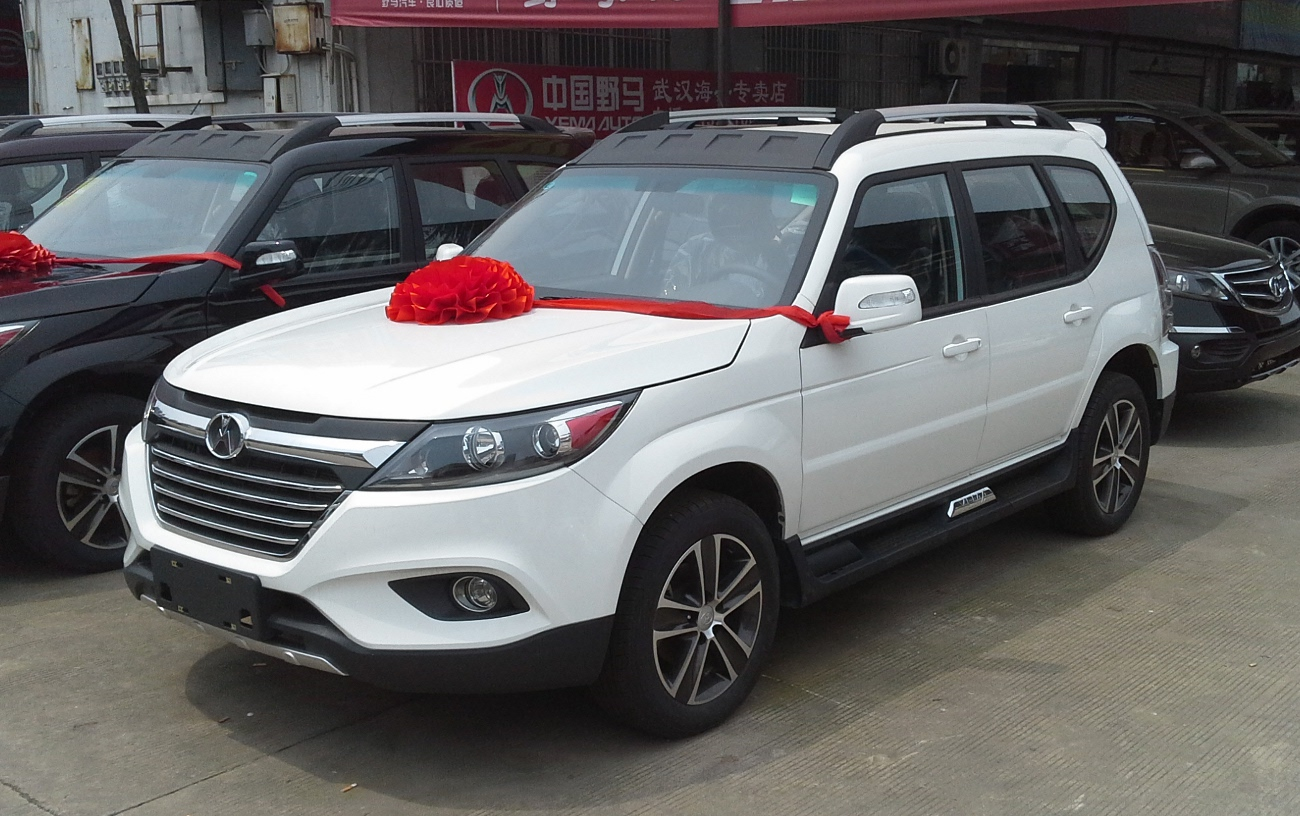
Yema F16

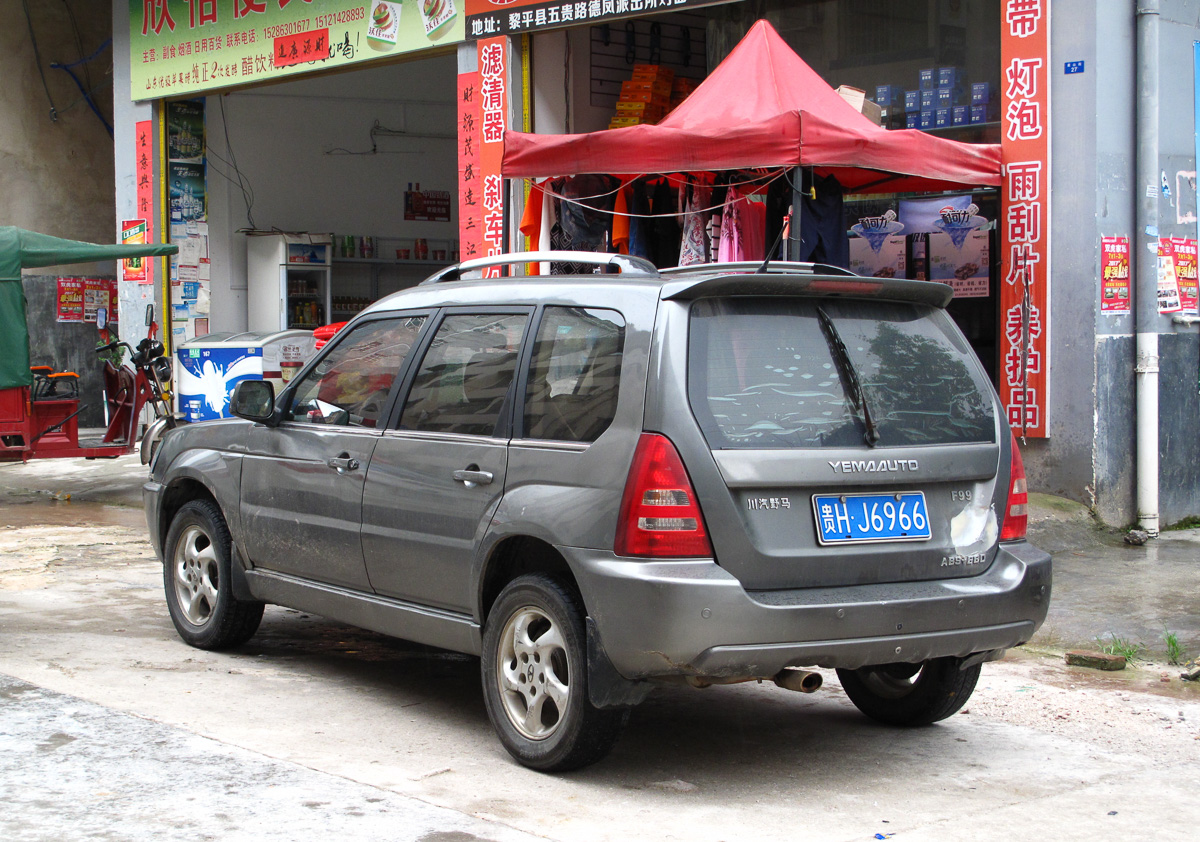
Yema F99 rear
