= Joylong iFly =

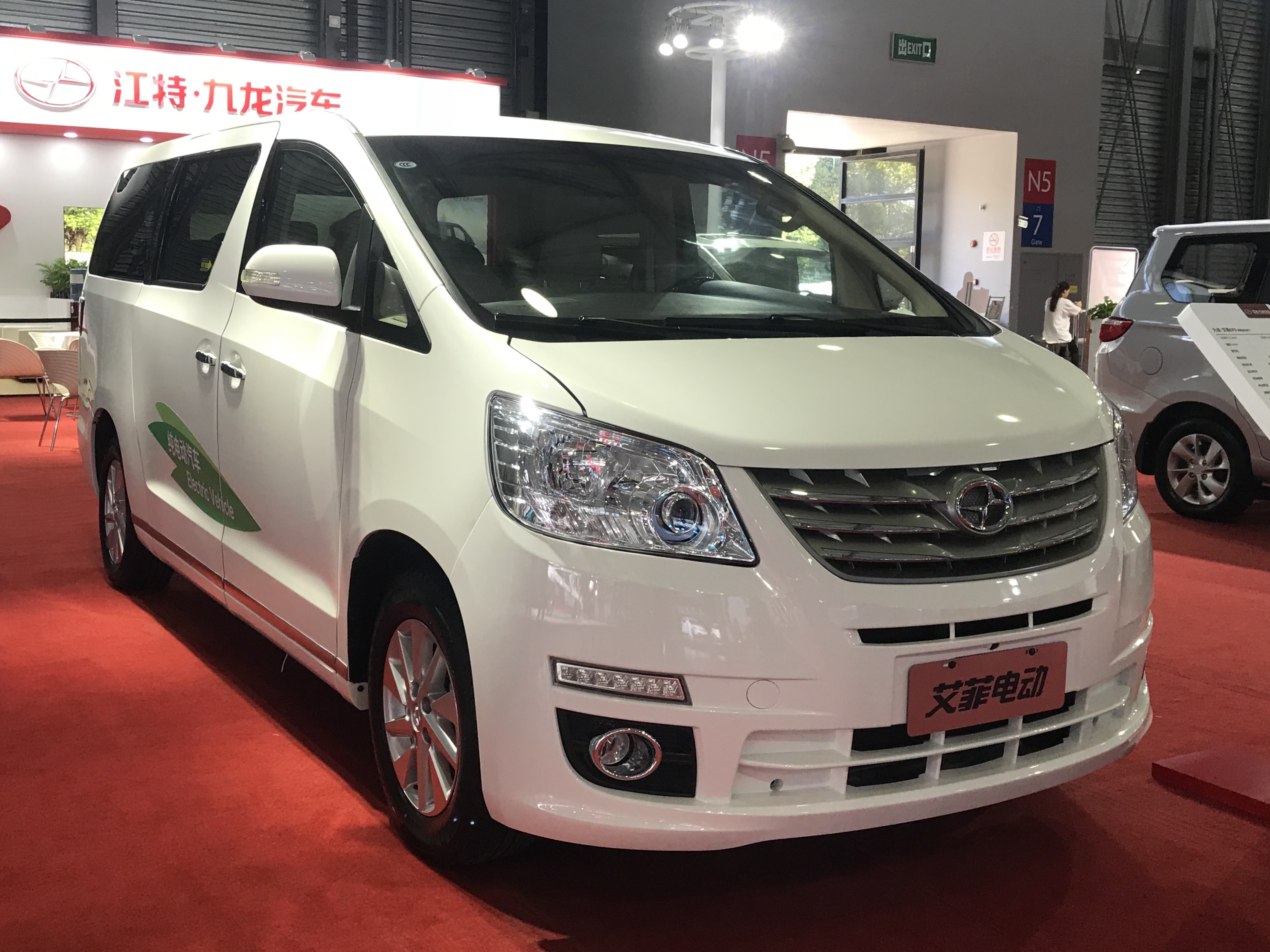
- Joylong iFly EV

Overview
- Also called: Joylong EF5; Joylong EF9; Doda V8
- Production: 2014–Present

Body and chassis
- Layout: Front-engine, front-wheel-drive; Rear-motor, rear-wheel drive (EV Version)

Powertrain
- Engine: 2.4 L 4G69 I4
- Electric motor: Permanent Magnet synchronous motor (EF5 & EF9)
- Transmission: 4-speed automatic; 6-speed DCT; 1-speed fixed gear (EV Version)
- Battery: 52.8 kWh lithium-ion battery (EF5); 102.8 kWh lithium-ion battery (EF9)

Dimensions
- Wheelbase: 2,950 mm (116 in)
- Length: 4,900 mm (190 in)
- Width: 1,835 mm (72.2 in)
- Height: 1,890 mm (74 in)
- Curb weight: 1,800 kg (4,000 lb)

The Joylong iFly (艾菲- Aifei) is a minivan produced by the Chinese automaker Jiangte Joylong Automobile since 2014. It is available as a seven-seater with petrol and electric versions available.

== Overview ==
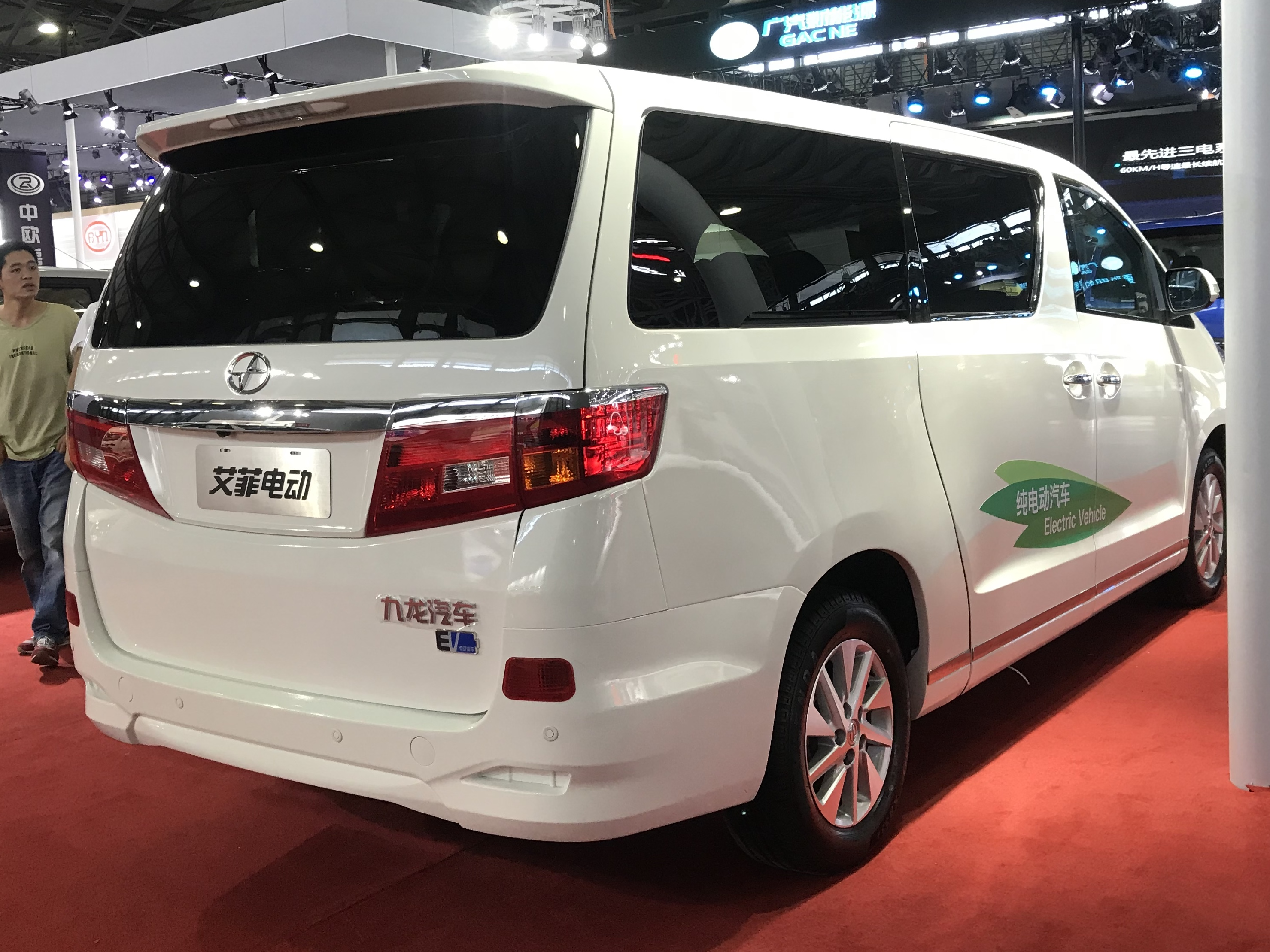
Joylong iFly EV rear

Debuting during the 2014 Beijing Auto Show in April 2014 with a launch on the Chinese auto market in the second half of 2014.

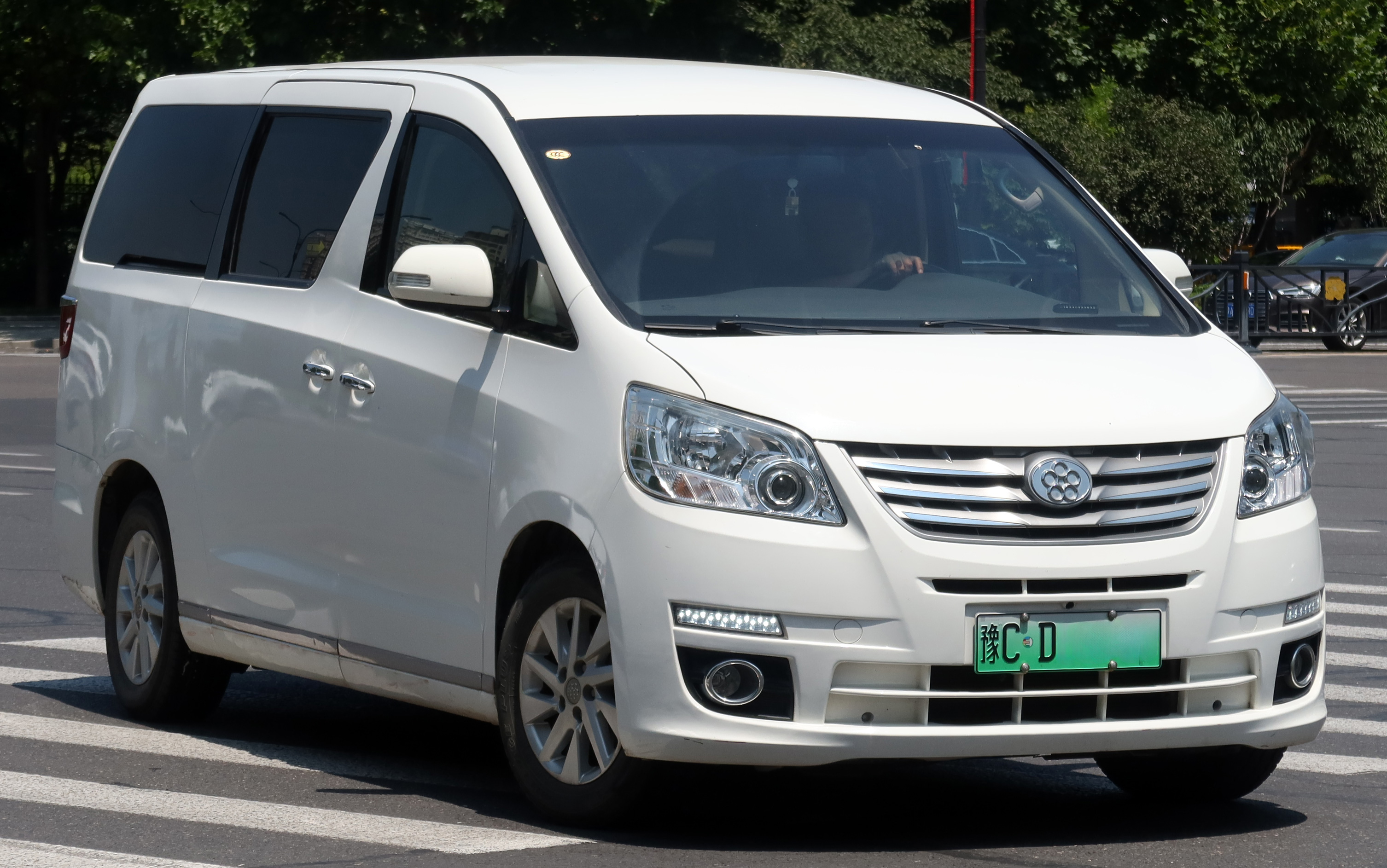
Guangtong (Joylong) iFly EV

=== Powertrain ===
The power of the Joylong iFly comes from the 4G69 165 hp 2.4 liter four-cylinder Mitsubishi-sourced engine producing 147 hp and 200 nm.

A model variant named the iFly F9 was launched in March 2021 featuring the same exterior while adding a 2.0 liter naturally aspirated inline-4 engine producing 144 hp and 200 N·m.

=== Design controversies ===
The design is controversial as the Joylong iFly heavily resembles the Toyota Alphard with spy shots during development confirming that the second generation Toyota Alphard was used as a benchmark vehicle.

Prices of the Joylong iFly ranges from 129,800 yuan to 312,800 yuan.

== Variants ==
=== Joylong iFly EV ===
The electric versions of the Joylong iFly is available as the Joylong EF5 and Joylong EF9. The Joylong EF5 features a 52.8 kWh battery capable of a range of 180 kilometers connected to a single motor powering the rear wheels.

=== Doda V8 ===
The Doda V8 is a rebadged van based on the iFly, powered by the same 4G69 165 hp 2.4 liter Mitsubishi-sourced engine as the iFly, and priced higher than the iFly. The vehicle was first previewed to foreign BAIC VIPs and dealers in April 2016, seen with an automatic transmission.

The van was officially launched in 2018 with a 2.0 liter engine and 5-gear manual transmission.

The Doda V8 is produced by BAIC Ruili, a subsidiary of Beijing Auto Industry Corporation. Ruili functions as a local production facility for BAIC, with productions including the BJ40, and Doda vehicles including the Doda V2 based on the Weiwang M20, and the Doda V8.

== See also ==
Chinese-made Alphard clones

- Refine M6 - First Chinese-made Alphard clone in 2013.
- Yema Spica - Third Chinese-made Alphard clone in 2015.

Original Japanese-made Alphard

- Toyota Alphard
