= JAC Refine M5 =

Light commercial van

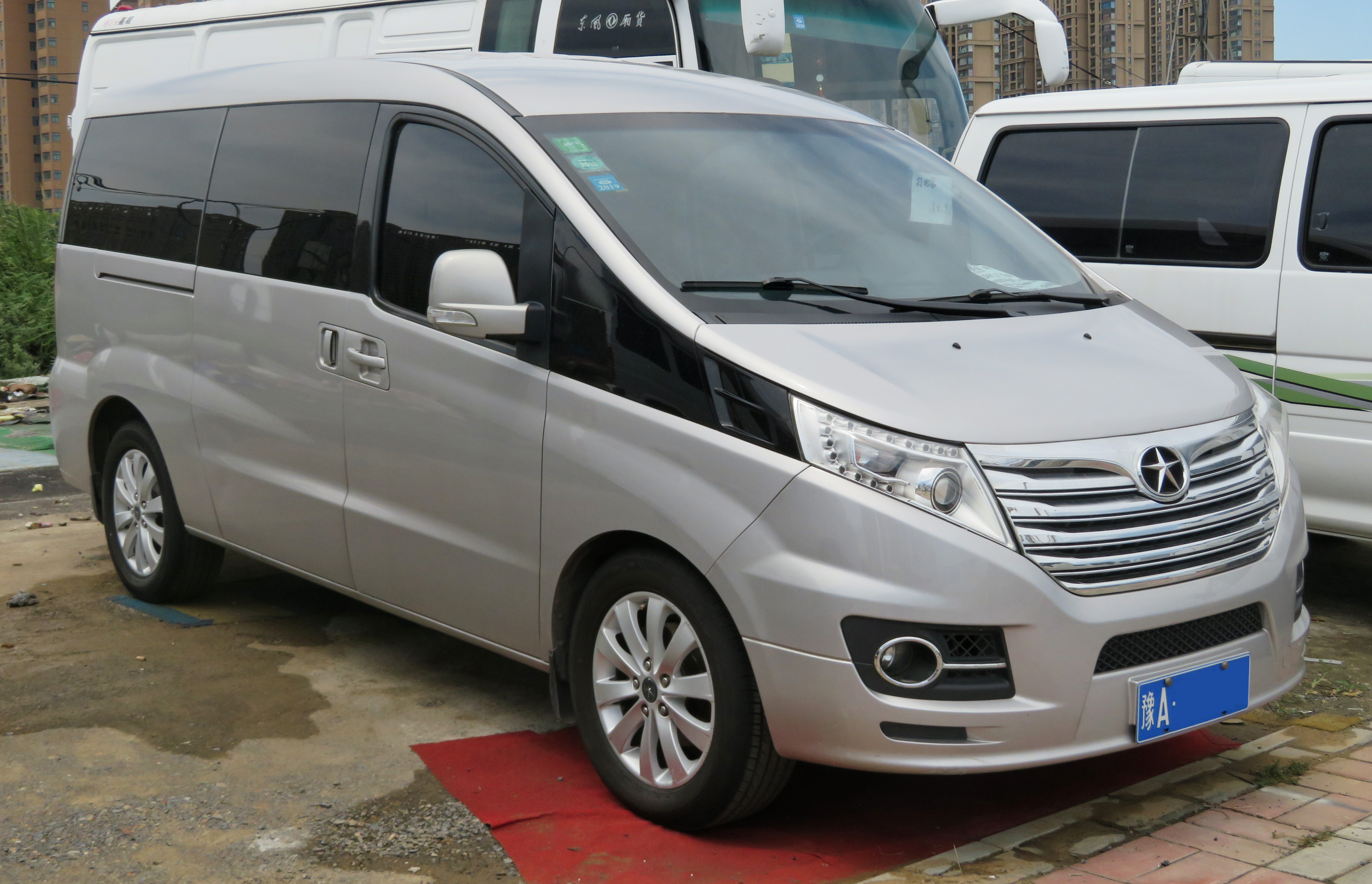

Overview
- Manufacturer: JAC Group
- Production: 2002–2025

Body and chassis
- Class: Light commercial vehicle (M)
- Body style: 5-door van 5-door minibus

The JAC Refine M5 (Chinese: 瑞風, Ruifeng M5) is a light commercial van produced by the JAC Group from 2002 to 2025. The Refine M5 marked the starting point of the Refine sub-brand under JAC, with the van was originally being called as the JAC Refine, Refine I, and Refine M1. The original first generation model is a rebadge model based on the first generation Hyundai Starex, with the post-facelift model starting to differentiate from the Hyundai van styling wise. The second generation was launched in April 2011 originally as the Refine II Hechang. In late 2012, the name was changed as the Refine M5 to sit under the Refine series.

== First generation (2002) ==
First generation
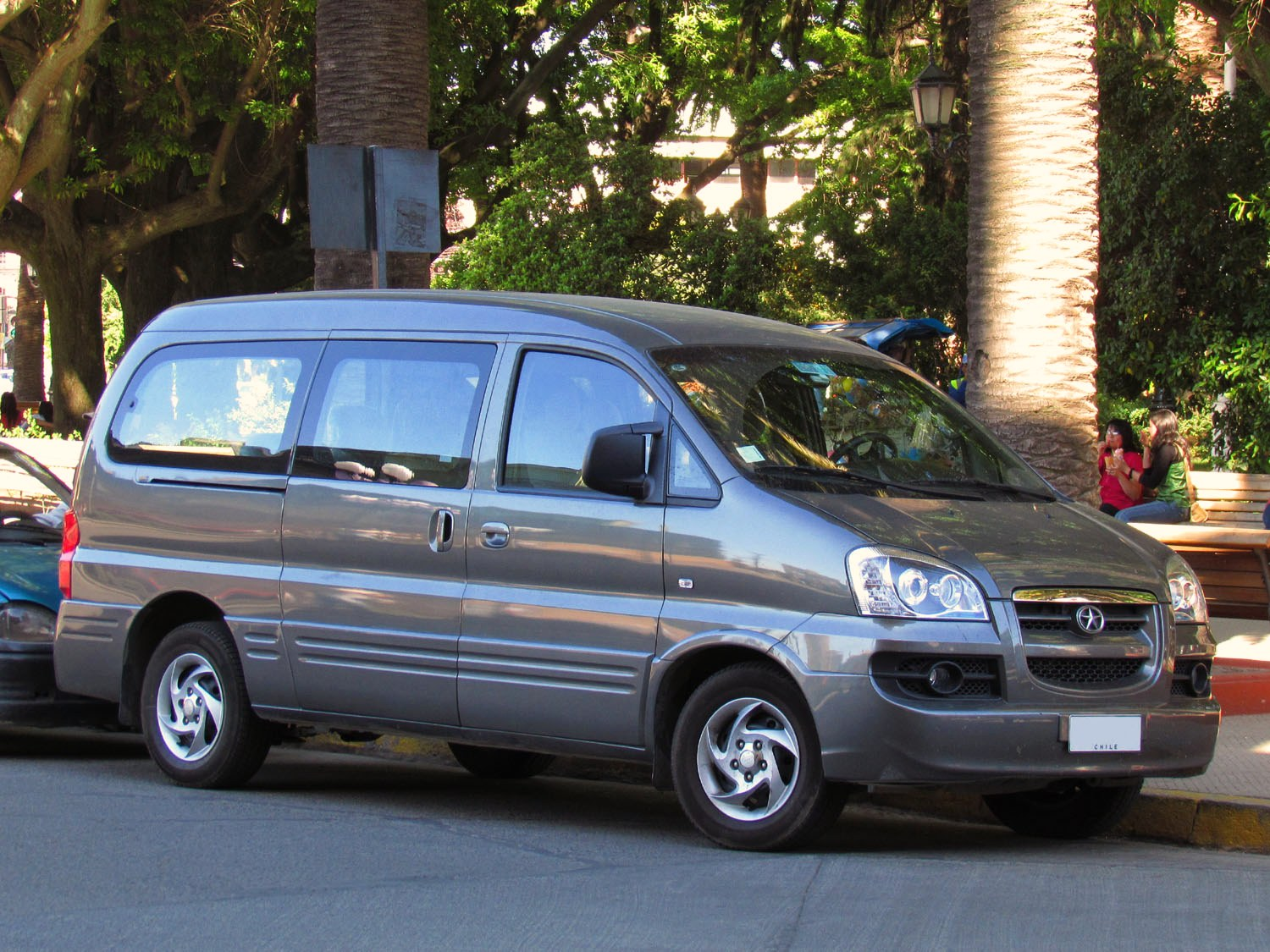
- JAC Refine TDi (2012)

Overview
- Also called: JAC Refine; JAC Refine I; JAC Refine M1; JAC Ruifeng M5; Pyeonghwa Samcheonri 0713 (North Korea)
- Production: 2002–2015
- Assembly: China: Hefei

Body and chassis
- Body style: 4-door van; 4-door minibus
- Layout: FR layout F4 layout
- Related: Hyundai Starex (A1)

Powertrain
- Engine: Petrol: 2.0 L HFC4GA3 I4; 2.0 L HFC4GA3-1C turbo I4; 2.4 L HFC4GA1-C I4; Diesel: 2.8 L HFC4DA1-2B1 I4
- Transmission: 5-speed manual; 4-speed automatic

Dimensions
- Wheelbase: 2,810 mm (110.6 in) (SWB); 3,080 mm (121.3 in) (LWB)
- Length: 4,740 mm (186.6 in) (SWB); 5,035 mm (198.2 in) (LWB)
- Width: 1,820 mm (71.7 in)
- Height: 1,880–1,950 mm (74.0–76.8 in)
- Curb weight: 1,950 kg (4,299 lb)

The first generation Refine (Refine I) was started out as a rebadged first generation Hyundai Starex. which, in turn; is a rebadged and license-built fourth generation Mitsubishi Delica due to the joint venture between Hyundai and JAC Motors with JAC building rebadged Hyundai Starexs under license in March 2002. The original name at launch was simply JAC Refine, later, the model was renamed to Refine M5 as a car of the luxury Refine series of JAC Motors.

As of 2013, the Refine is offered in three trim levels, from low to high is the Chuansuo, Xianghe, and M5 series. The M5 is the top of the trim model and was developed as the second generation Refine, with the name later being officially the Refine M5.

The Refine is offered with several engine options: A 2.0-liter HFC4GA3-1B inline-4 16V DOHC engine with either a 4-speed automatic transmission or a 5-speed manual transmission. The 2.0-liter HFC4GA3-B, 2.0-liter HFC4GA1-2B, and 2.4-liter HFC4GA1-B are all inline-4 16V DOHC engines mated to a 5-speed manual transmission. A 2.8-liter HFC4DA1-2B1 inline-4 8V SOHC diesel engine also comes mated to a 5-speed manual transmission.

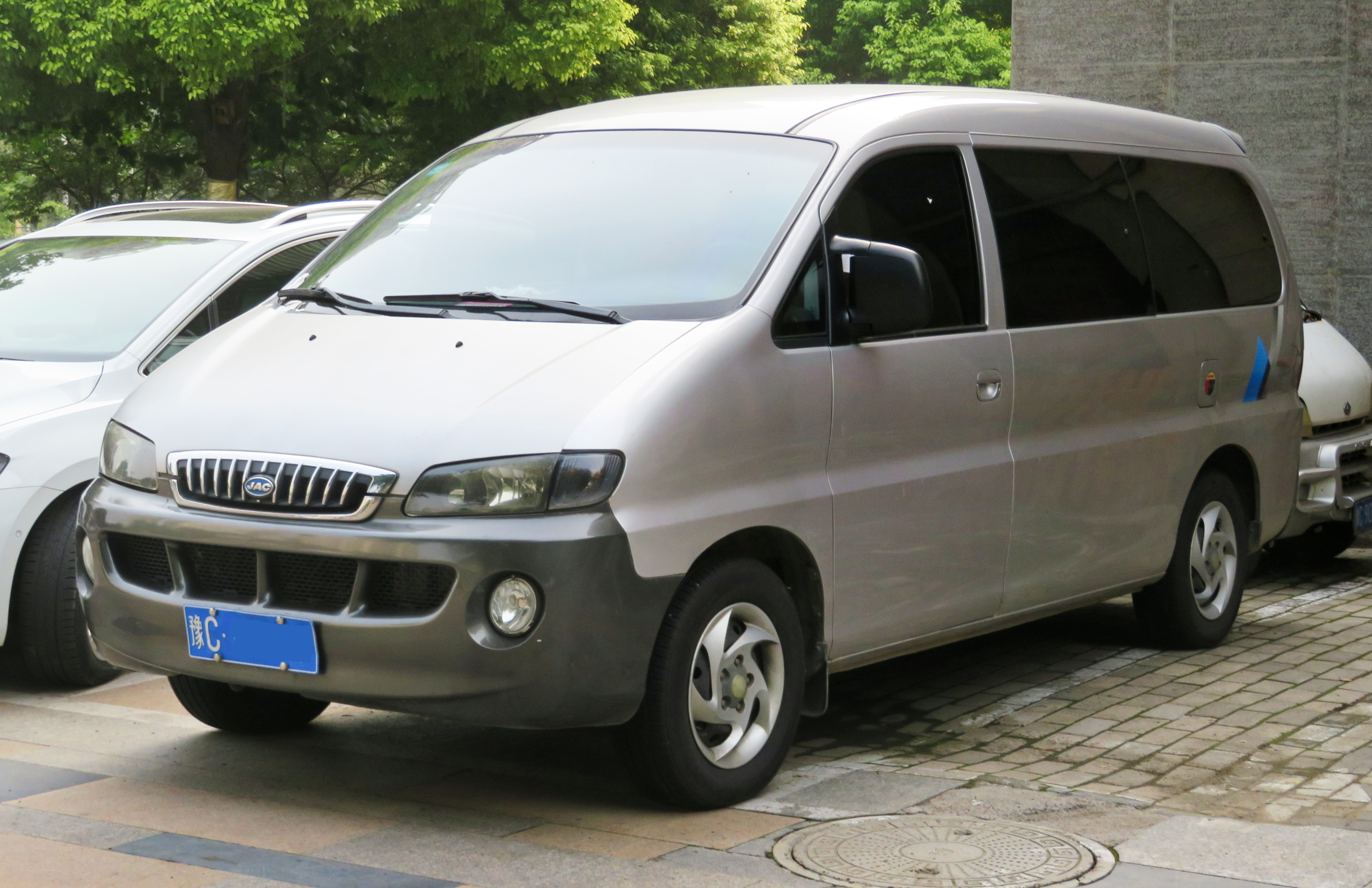
JAC Refine I (pre-facelift)

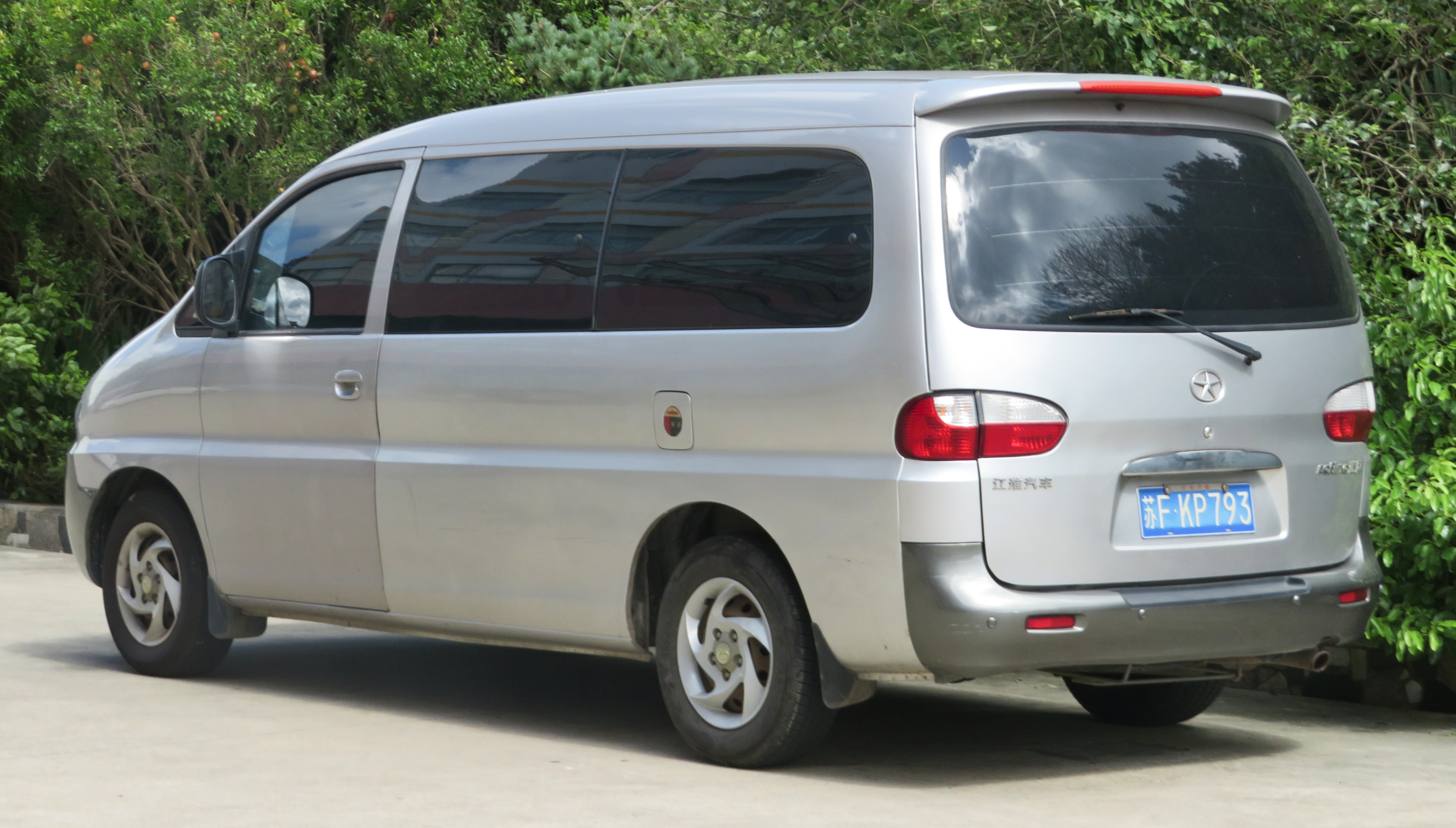
Rear view

=== Facelift ===
A facelift was conducted on the Hyundai-Starex-based Refine, with the front DRG still being visually similar to the post-facelift first generation Starex while featuring a independently developed rear end design, replacing the tail lamps, tail gate, and rear bumper. In the first few years of its introduction, the M5 (second generation Refine) was sold alongside its predecessor.

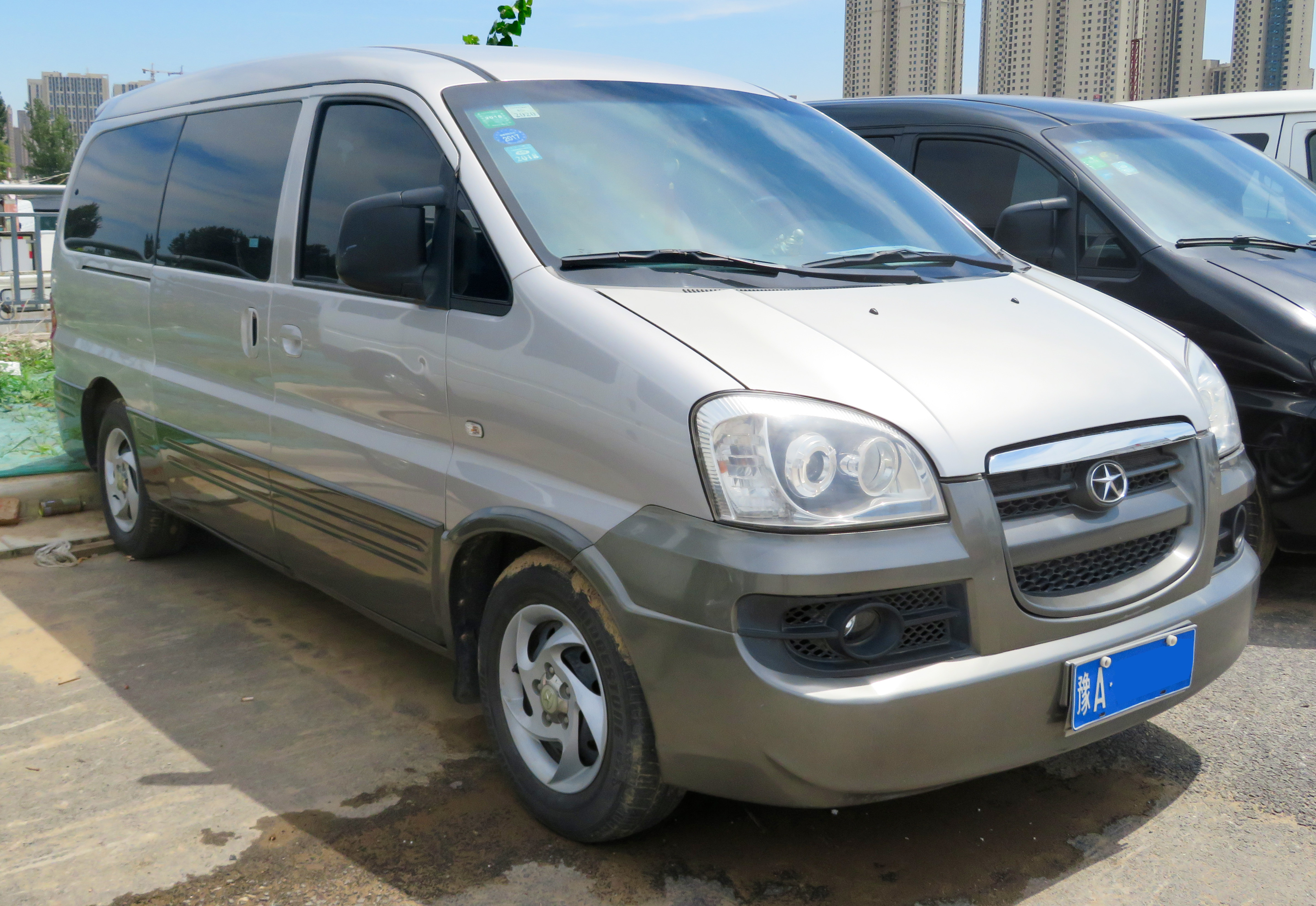
JAC Refine I (facelift)

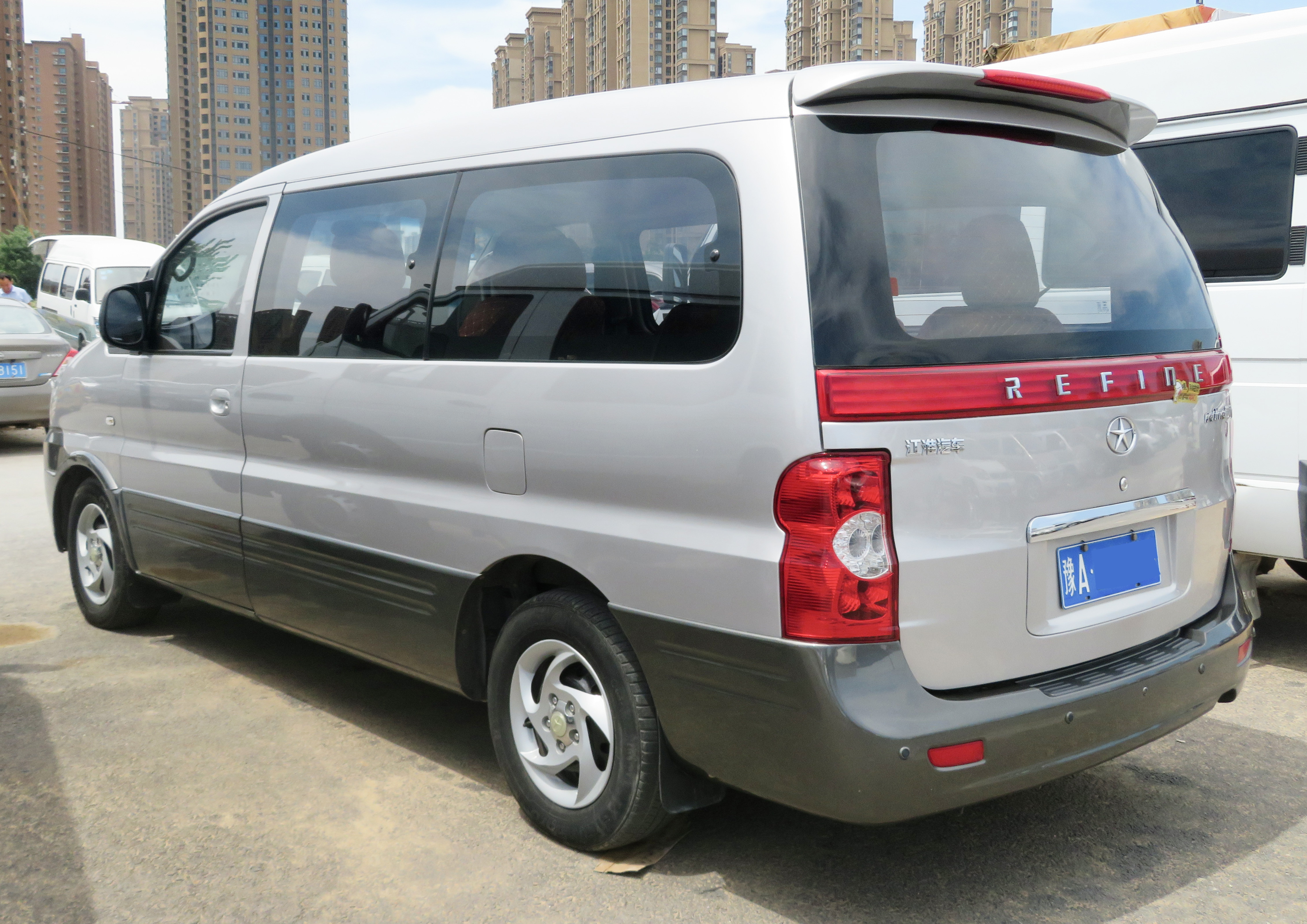
Rear view

== Second generation (2011) ==
Second generation
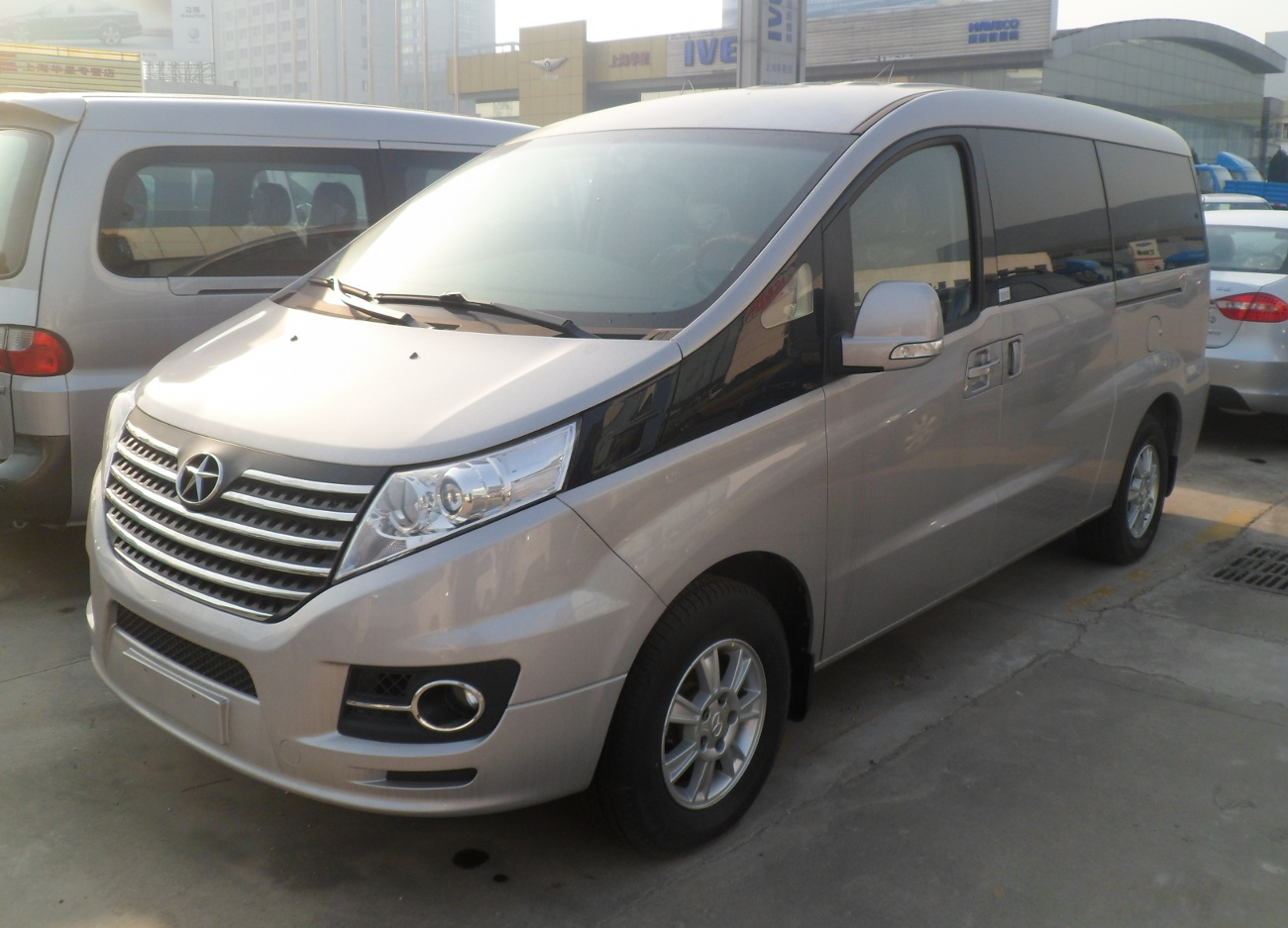

Overview
- Also called: JAC Refine II; JAC Refine L5
- Production: 2011–2025
- Model years: 2012–2026
- Assembly: China: Hefei

Body and chassis
- Body style: 5-door van 5-door minibus
- Layout: FR layout F4 layout

Powertrain
- Engine: Petrol: 1.8 L HFC4GA5-1C turbo I4; 2.0 L HFC4GA3-1D/HFC4GA3-4D turbo I4; Diesel: 1.8 L HFC4DB3-2C turbo I4; 1.9 L HFC4DB1-2C/HFC4DB1-2D turbo I4
- Transmission: 6-speed manual 6-speed DCT; 5-speed automatic

Dimensions
- Wheelbase: 3,080 mm (121.3 in)
- Length: 5,100 mm (200.8 in)
- Width: 1,840 mm (72.4 in)
- Height: 1,970 mm (77.6 in)

The second generation Refine (Refine II) or Refine M5 was debuted as a concept named as the JAC Refine IV at the 2010 Beijing Auto Show. The production car debuted at the 2011 Shanghai Auto Show in April 2011. The power of the Refine M5 comes from a 2.0-liter engine producing 177 hp (132 kW; 179 PS) and 260 N⋅m (192 lb⋅ft). After the establishment of the Refine luxury series, the JAC Refine MPV was renamed to Refine M5, positioning it between the Refine M4 and Refine M6 within a long line of products. The second generation Refine M5 MPV was priced from 139,500 to 166,500 yuan.

In August 2021 the name was changed as the JAC Refine L5.

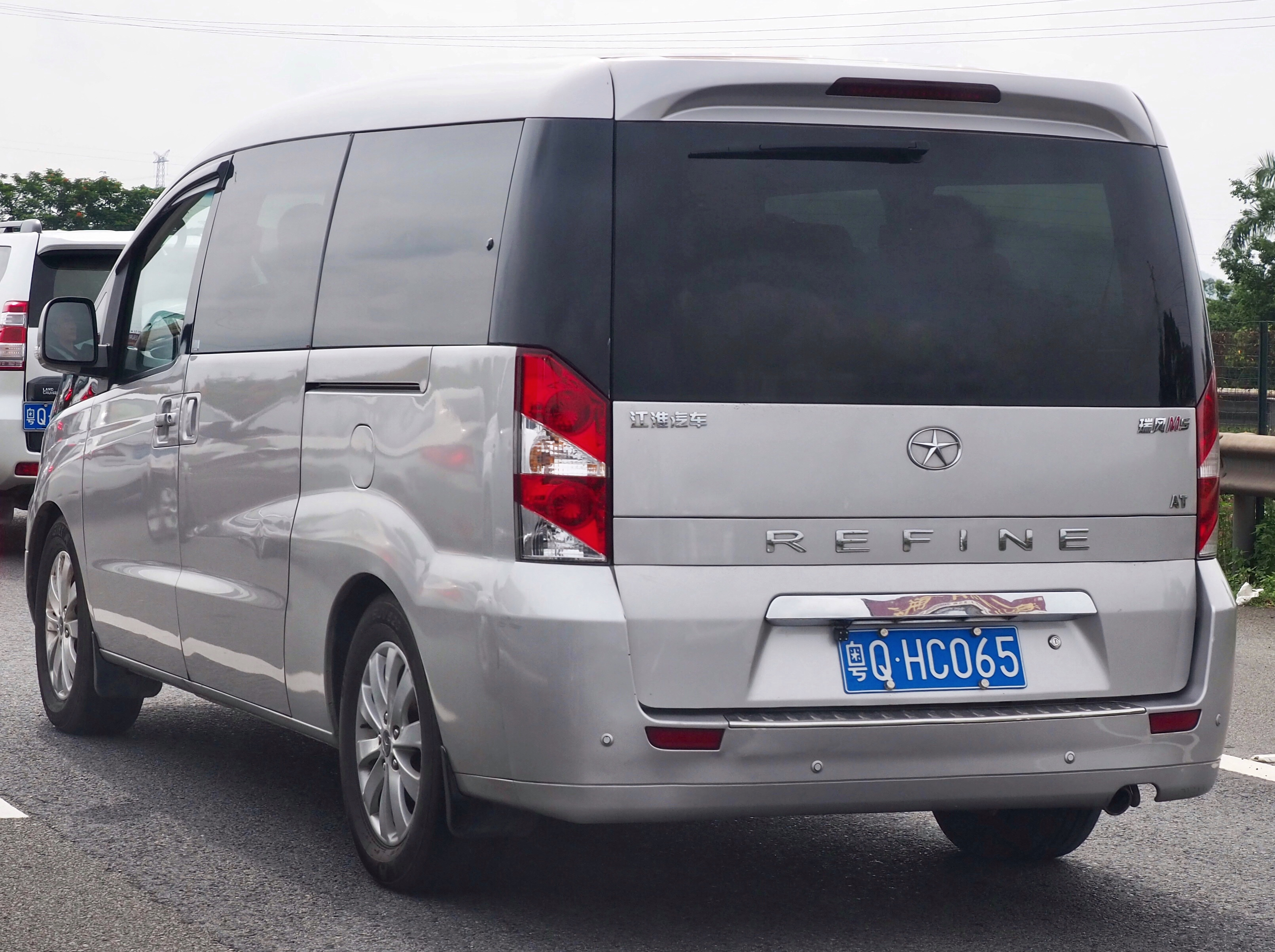
Rear view
