= Yema F-series =

Chinese series of compact crossover SUVs

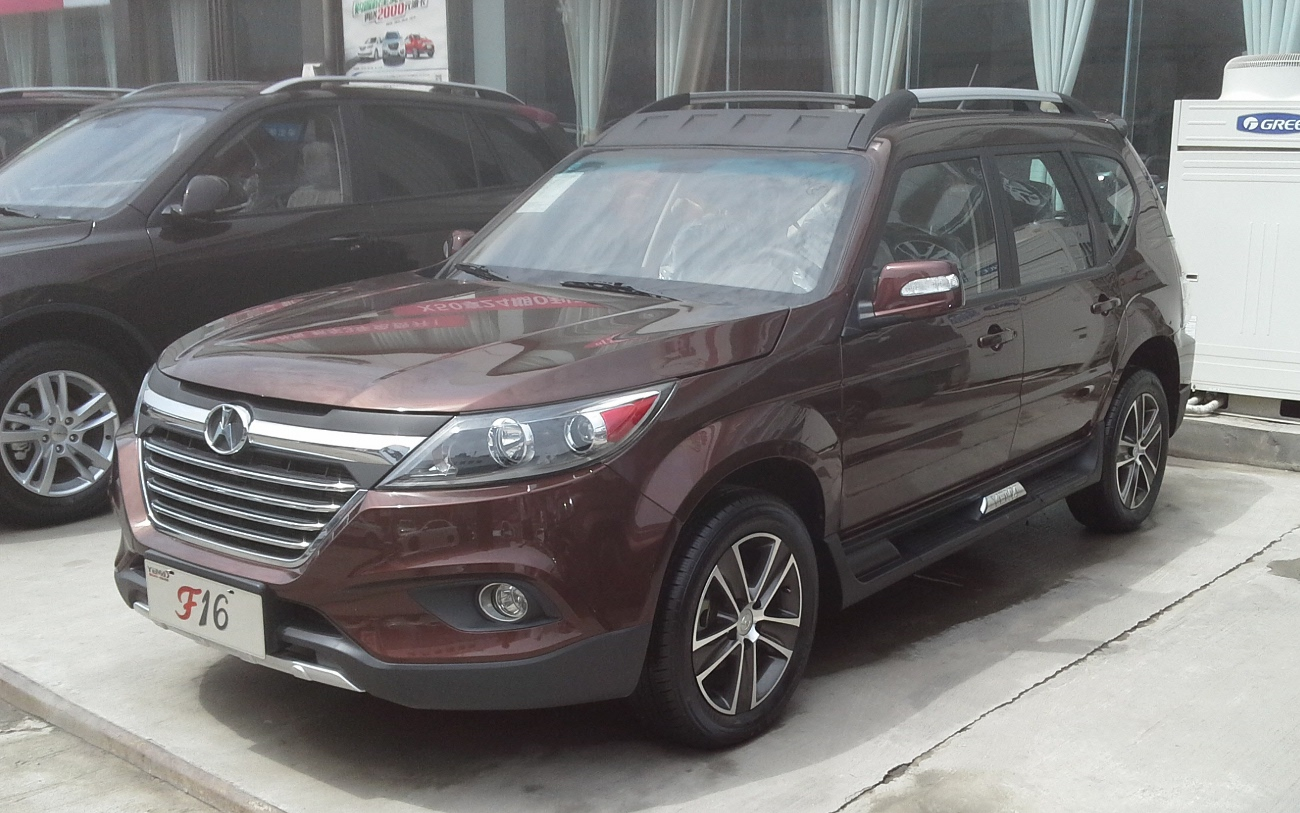

Overview
- Also called: Yema F99; Yema F10; Yema F11; Yema F12; Yema F16
- Production: 2001–2007; 2011–2017

Body and chassis
- Layout: FF layout
- Related: Austin Maestro; Austin Montego

Powertrain
- Engine: 1.5 L 1.6 L
- Transmission: 5-speed manual CVT

Dimensions
- Wheelbase: 2,515 mm (99.0 in)
- Length: 4,163 mm (163.9 in)
- Width: 1,720 mm (67.7 in)
- Height: 1,630 mm (64.2 in)
- Curb weight: 1,130 kg (2,491.2 lb)

The Yema F-series is a series of compact crossover SUVs manufactured since 2001 by Yema Auto. Available in China from 2001, the Yema F-series crossovers share their platform with the Austin Maestro. The first crossover of the series was the Yema F99.

== Yema F99 ==
The Yema F99 is the first car of Sichuan Yema Automobile (Chuanqi Yema), and the Yema F99 is based on the Austin Maestro platform. The Yema F99 was powered by a Toyota-sourced 1.5 liter engine with 72 kW (97 hp; 98 PS) and 132 N⋅m (97 lb⋅ft; 13 kg⋅m) of torque. Prices of the Yema F99 ranged from around 50,000 yuan to 70,000 yuan, with the price range before discontinuation from 47,800 yuan to 49,800 yuan.

Styling was always controversial with the whole Yema F-series crossovers starting from the Yema F99, as the styling heavily resembles the second generation Subaru Forester.

== Yema F10 ==
The Yema F10 is essentially an updated model based on the F99, and it was revealed in 2011, and features Audi-inspired front grille that could be also seen on the Yema F16. The Yema F10 was powered by the same engine as the Yema F99 but was positioned slightly upmarket which made the top trim Yema F10 slightly more expensive with a price ranging from 45,800 yuan to 58,800 yuan. The F10 is essentially a higher trim level of the F99.

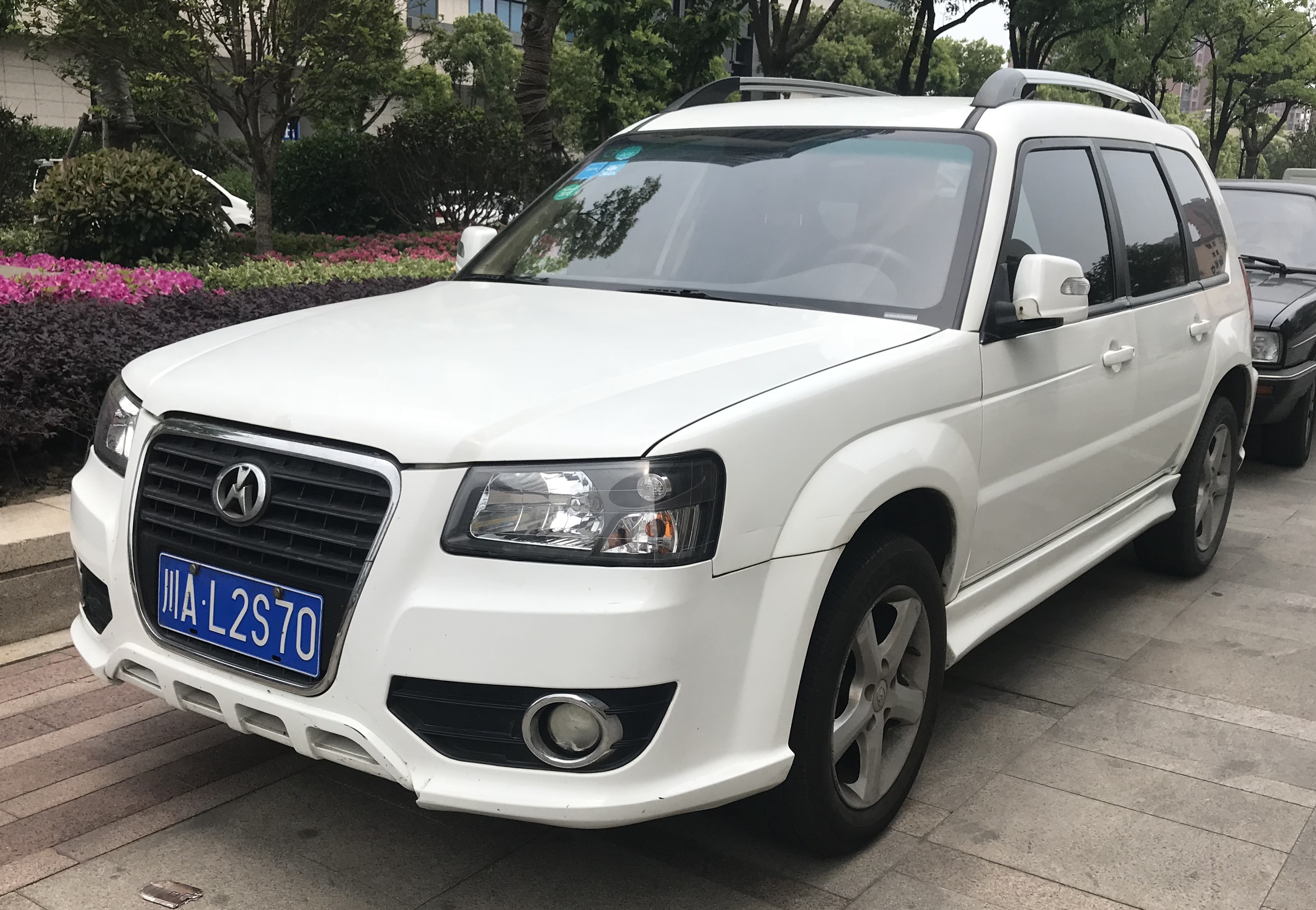
Yema F10

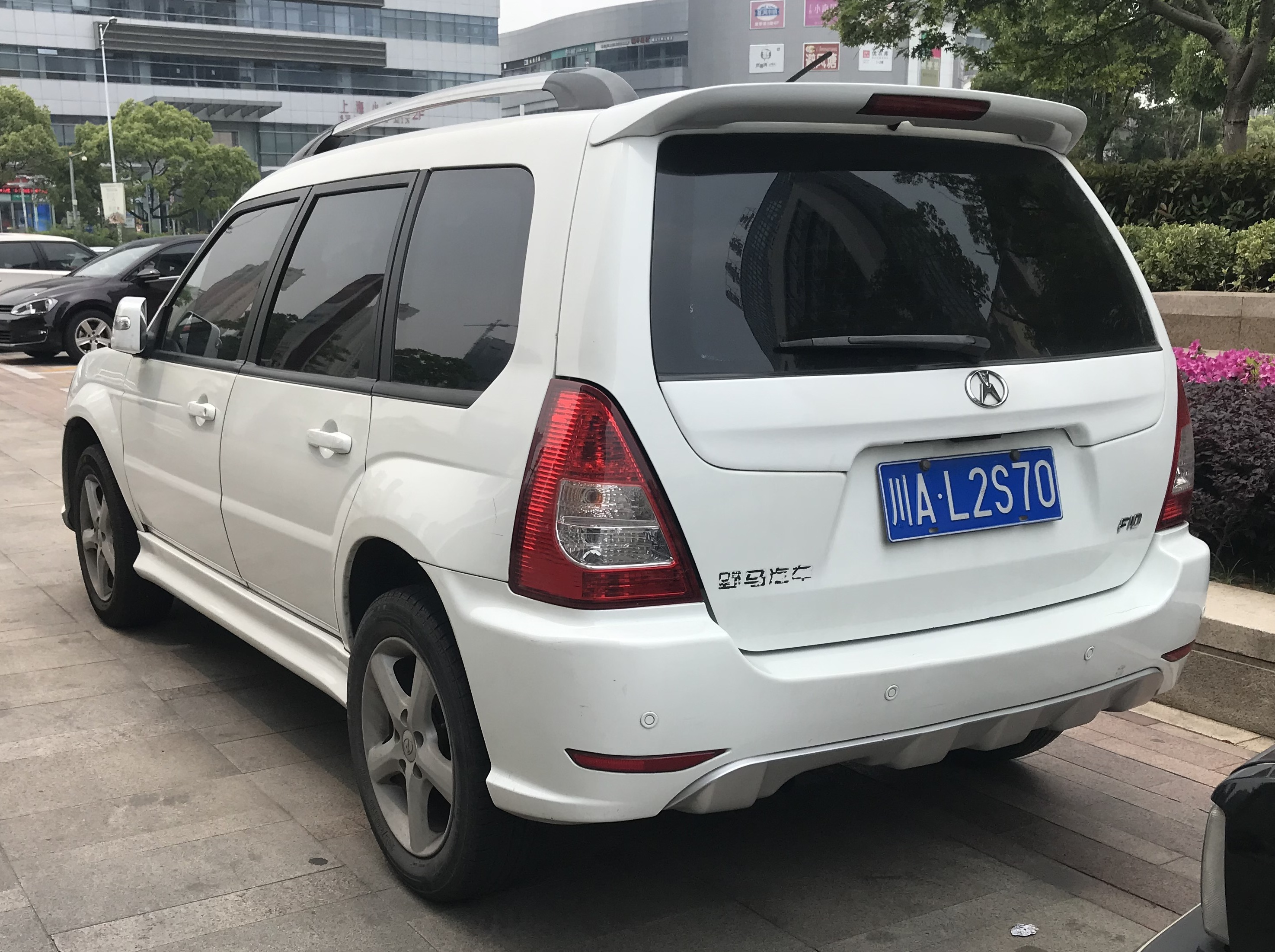
Yema F10 rear

=== Yema F11 ===
he Yema F11 was revealed as a concept alongside the F10, F12, and F99 facelift, and just like the other models of the Yema F-series range, the Yema F11 was essentially a restyled Yema F99. Design-wise, the Yema F11 concept was largely the same as the Yema F10 and F12 while featuring a restyled front end design heavily resembling the third generation Subaru Forester.

== Yema F12 ==
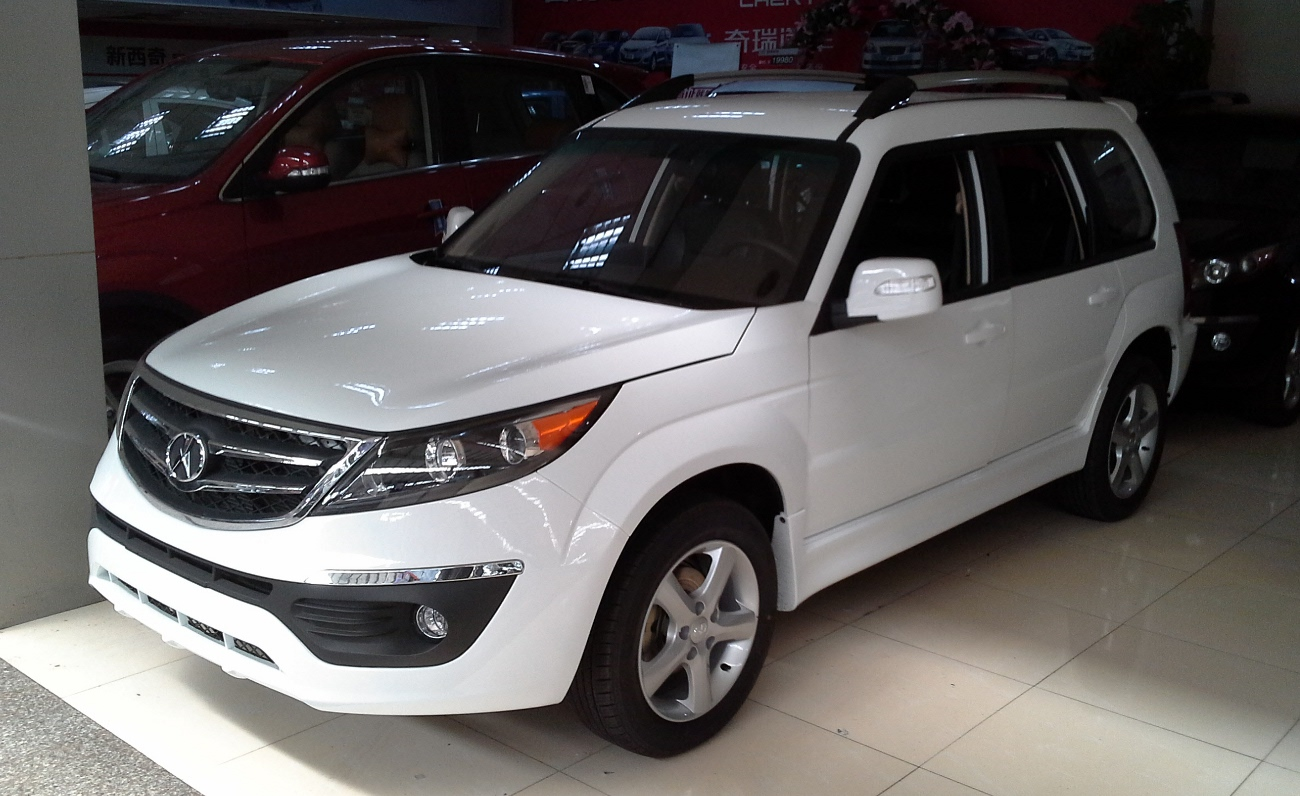
Yema F12

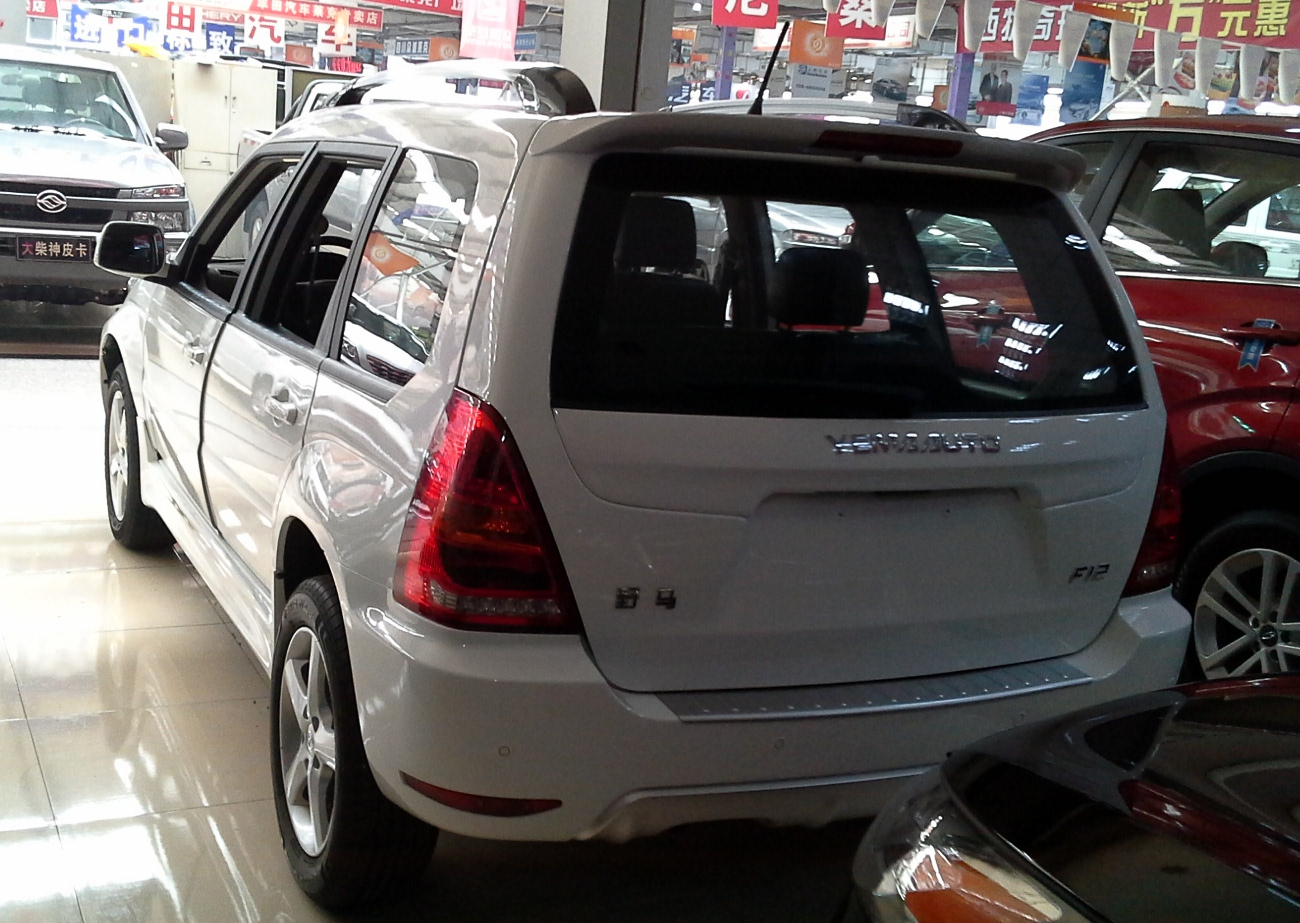
Yema F12 rear

The Yema F12 was revealed in 2011, and was sold from 2011 to 2014 and has a price ranging from 48,800 yuan to 62,800 yuan. Design wise, the Yema F12 was largely the same as the Yema F10 while featuring a restyled front end design heavily resembling the third generation Kia Sportage.

== Yema F16 ==
The Yema F16 name was used during the 2011 Chengdu Auto Show as the Yema F16 wagon concept, with the design being criticized by Chinese press for being too similar to the Audi A4 Avant. However, the production Yema F16 turned out to be based on the Yema F12 with a restyled front bumper and slightly different grille insert. The Yema F16 was sold from 2011 to 2014 and has a price ranging from 55,800 yuan to 69,800 yuan.

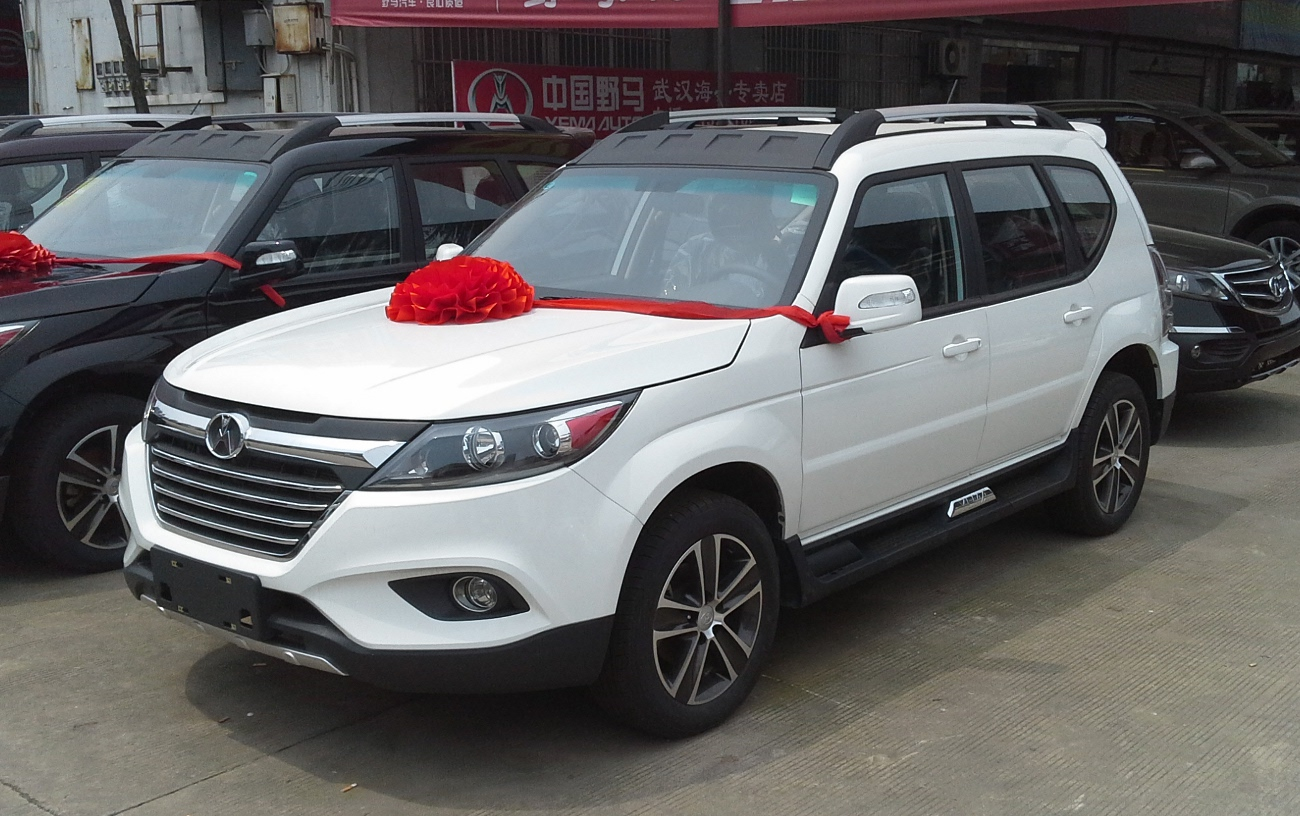

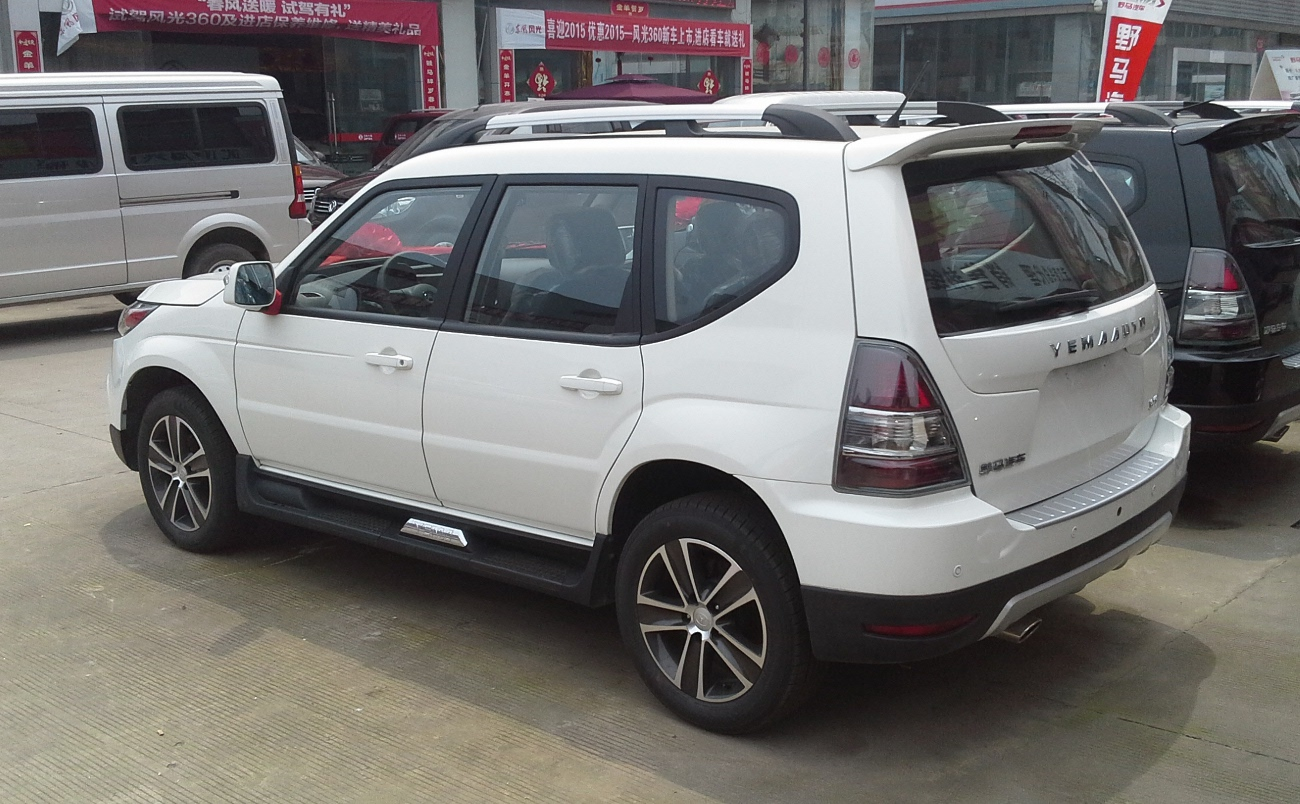
