= List of Nissan platforms =

Nissan platforms include:

- Renault-Nissan B platform
- Renault–Nissan C platform
- Renault–Nissan Common Module Family
- Renault–Nissan D platform
- Nissan F-Alpha platform
- Nissan FF-L platform
- Nissan MS platform
- Nissan FM platform
- Nissan S platform
