= Nissan MS platform =

Automobile Platform by Nissan

The Nissan MS platform, M&S platform or FF-S platform is an automobile platform for front wheel drive automobiles. According to Nissan in 2000, vehicles built on this platform share floor panel and functional assemblies such as the engine, transmission and chassis components attached to it.

== Models ==
- Nissan Almera (N16)
- Nissan Bluebird Sylphy (G10)
- Nissan Primera (P12)
- Nissan Sunny/Nissan Sentra (B15)
- Nissan Almera Tino (V10)
- Nissan Wingroad/Nissan AD Van (Y11)
- Nissan X-Trail (T30)
- Renault Samsung SM3/Nissan Almera Classic
- Nissan Serena (C24)
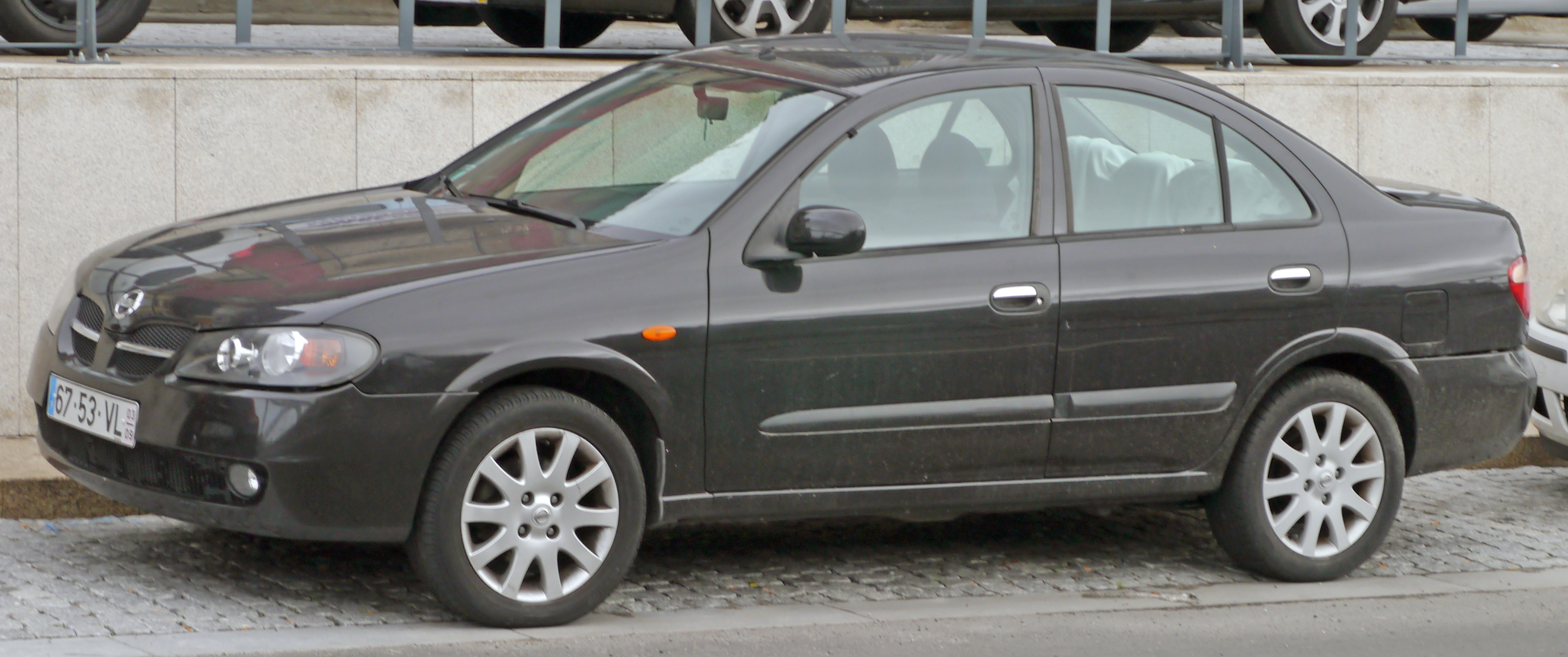
Nissan Almera (N16)

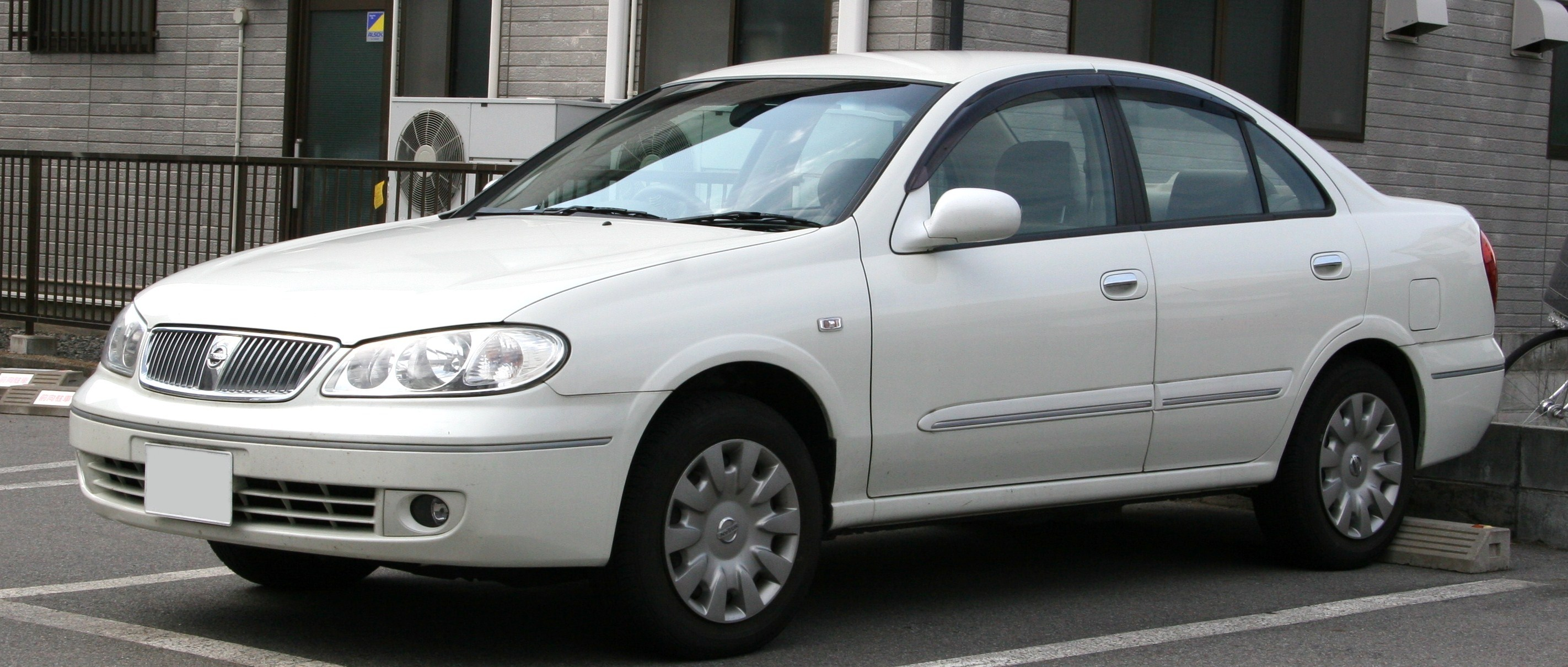
Nissan Bluebird Sylphy (G10)

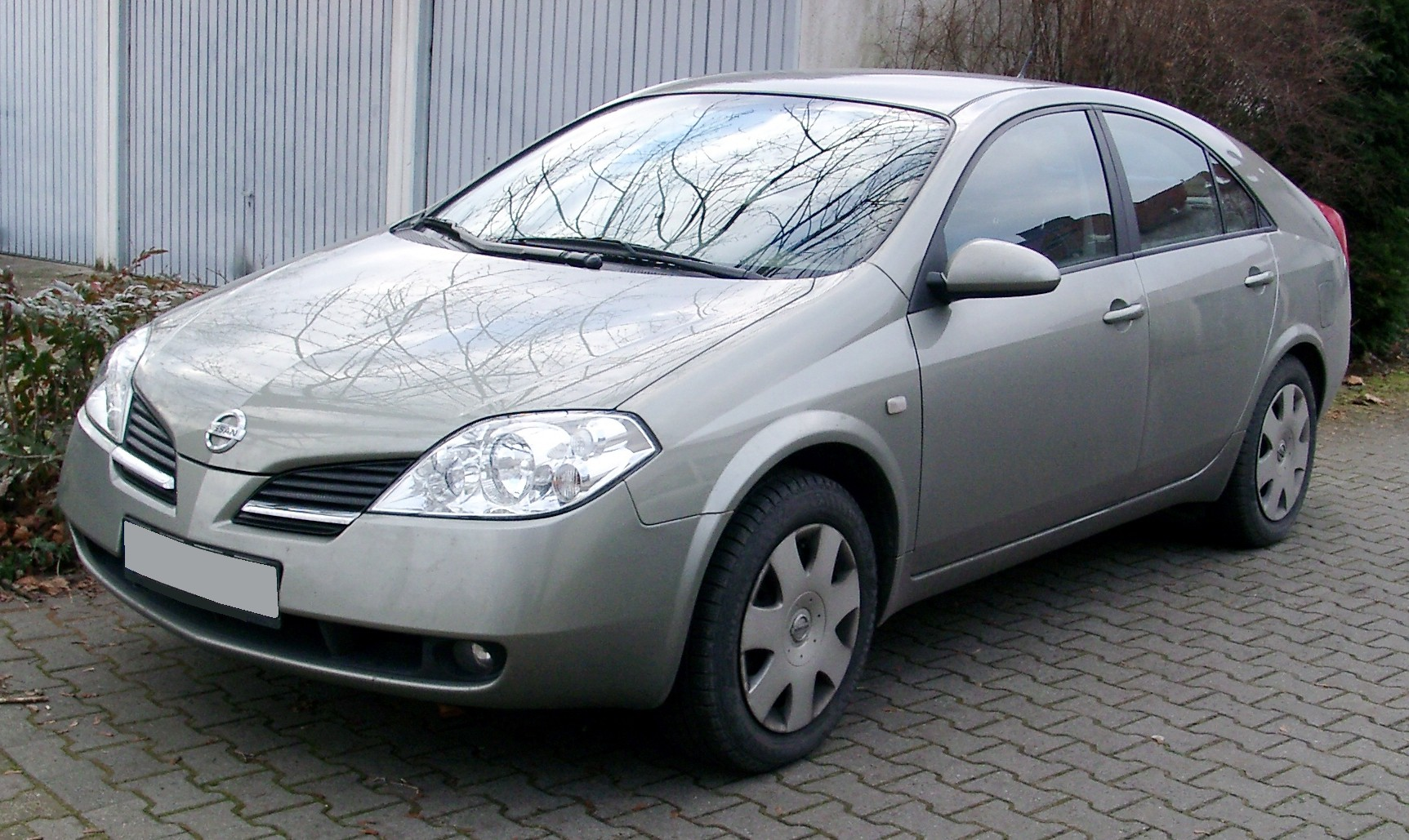
Nissan Primera (P12)

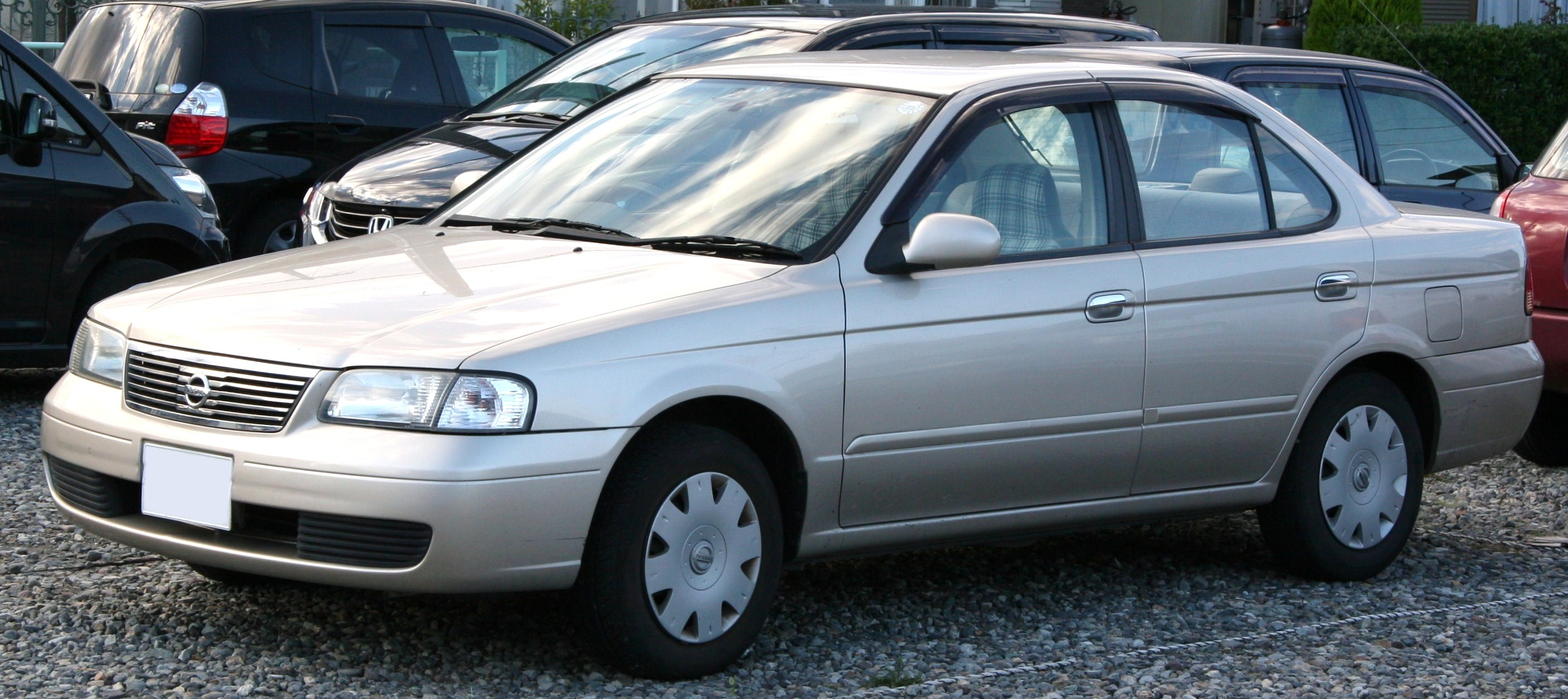
Nissan Sunny/Sentra (B15)

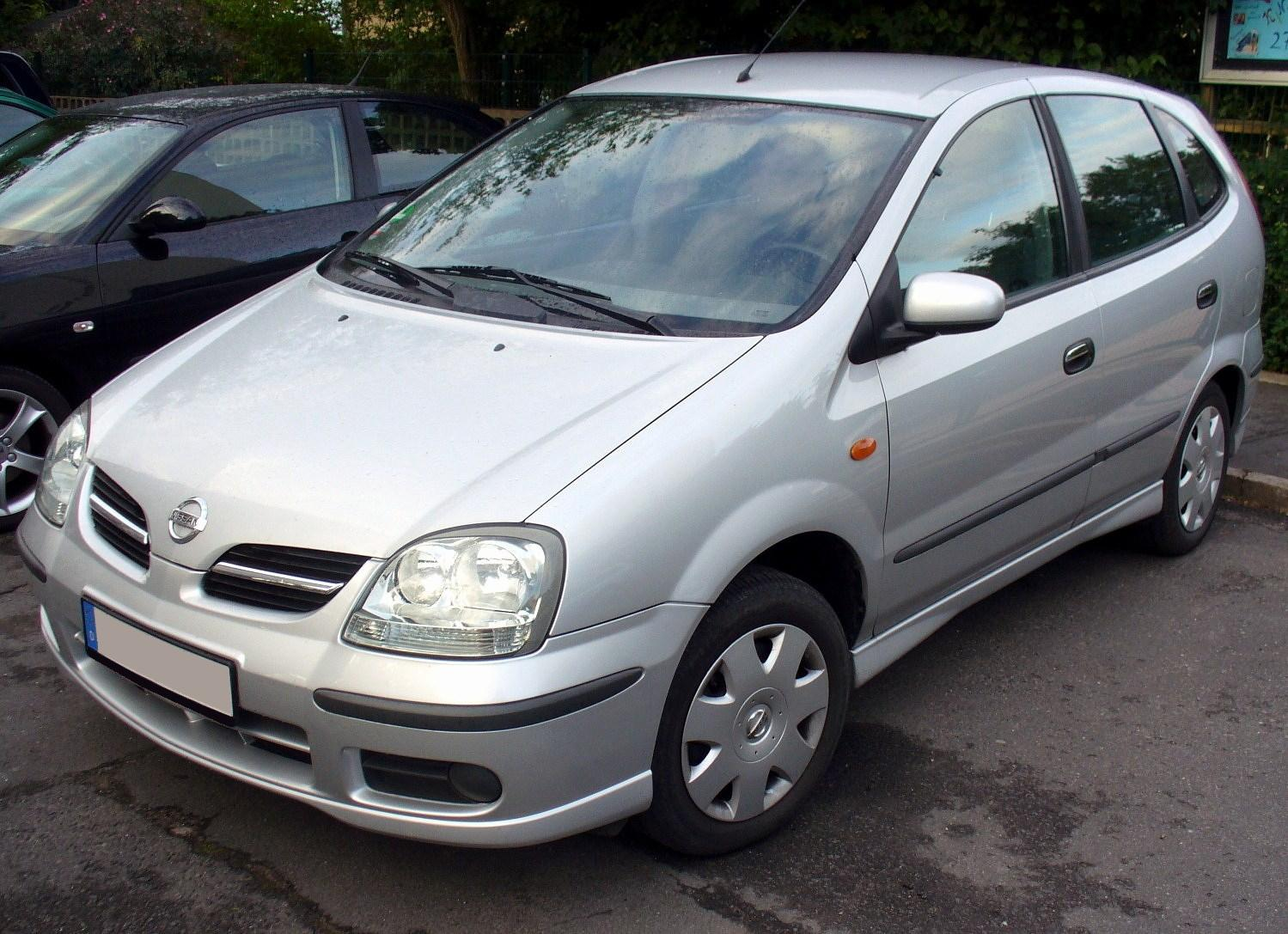
Nissan Almera Tino (V10)

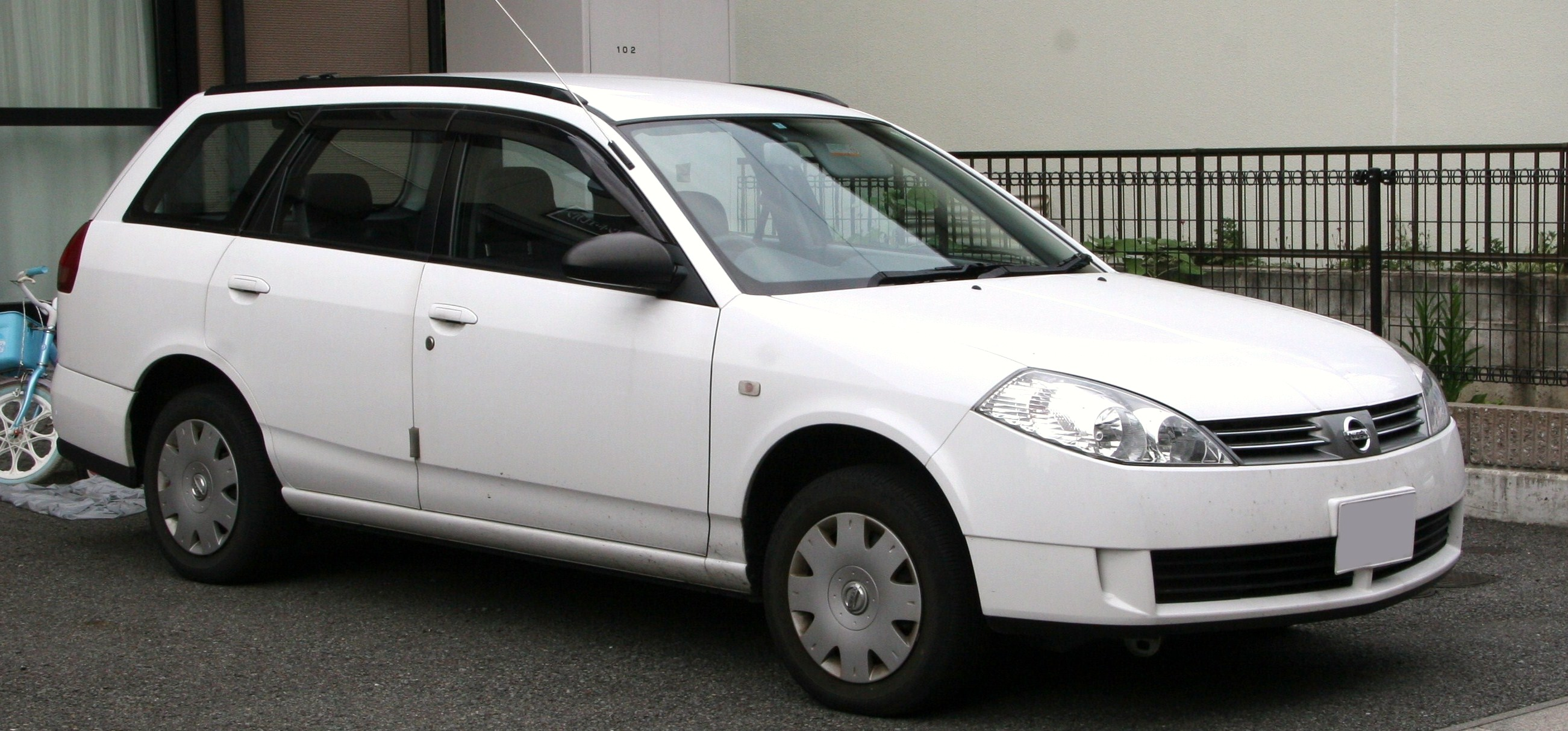
Nissan Wingroad/AD Van (Y11)

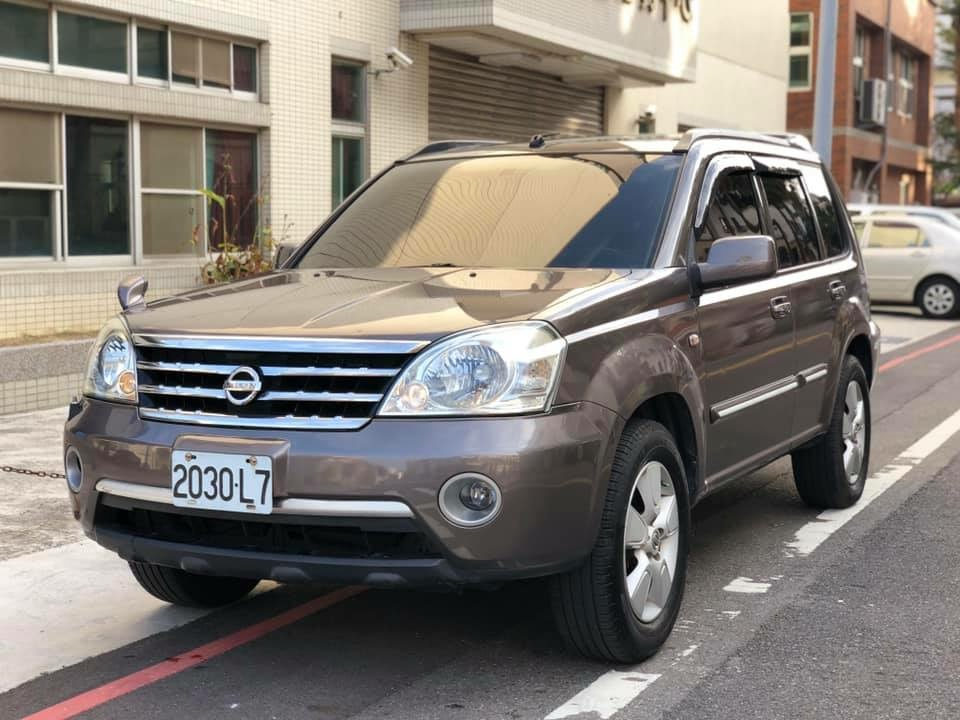
Nissan X-Trail (T30)

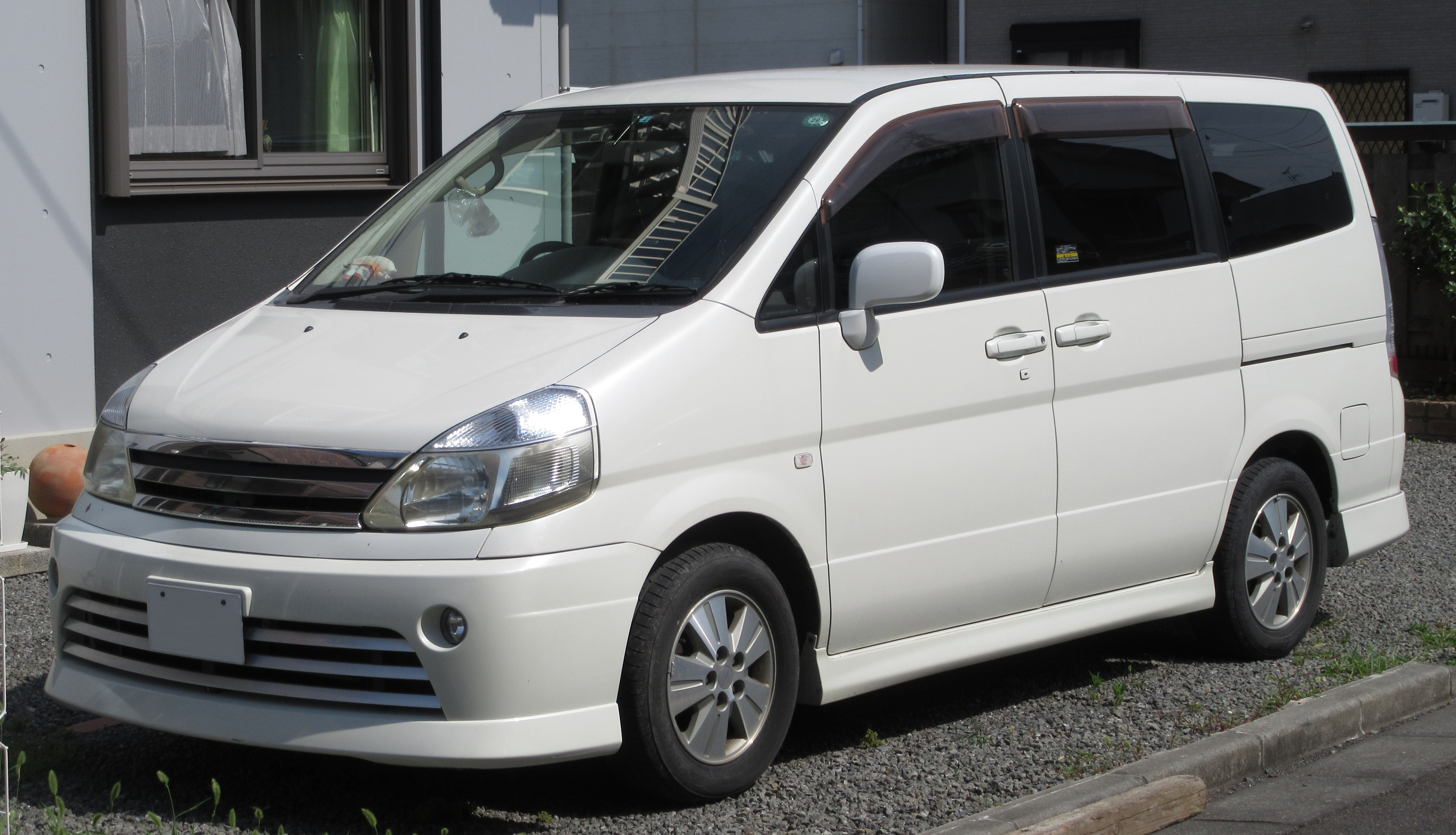
Nissan Serena (C24)

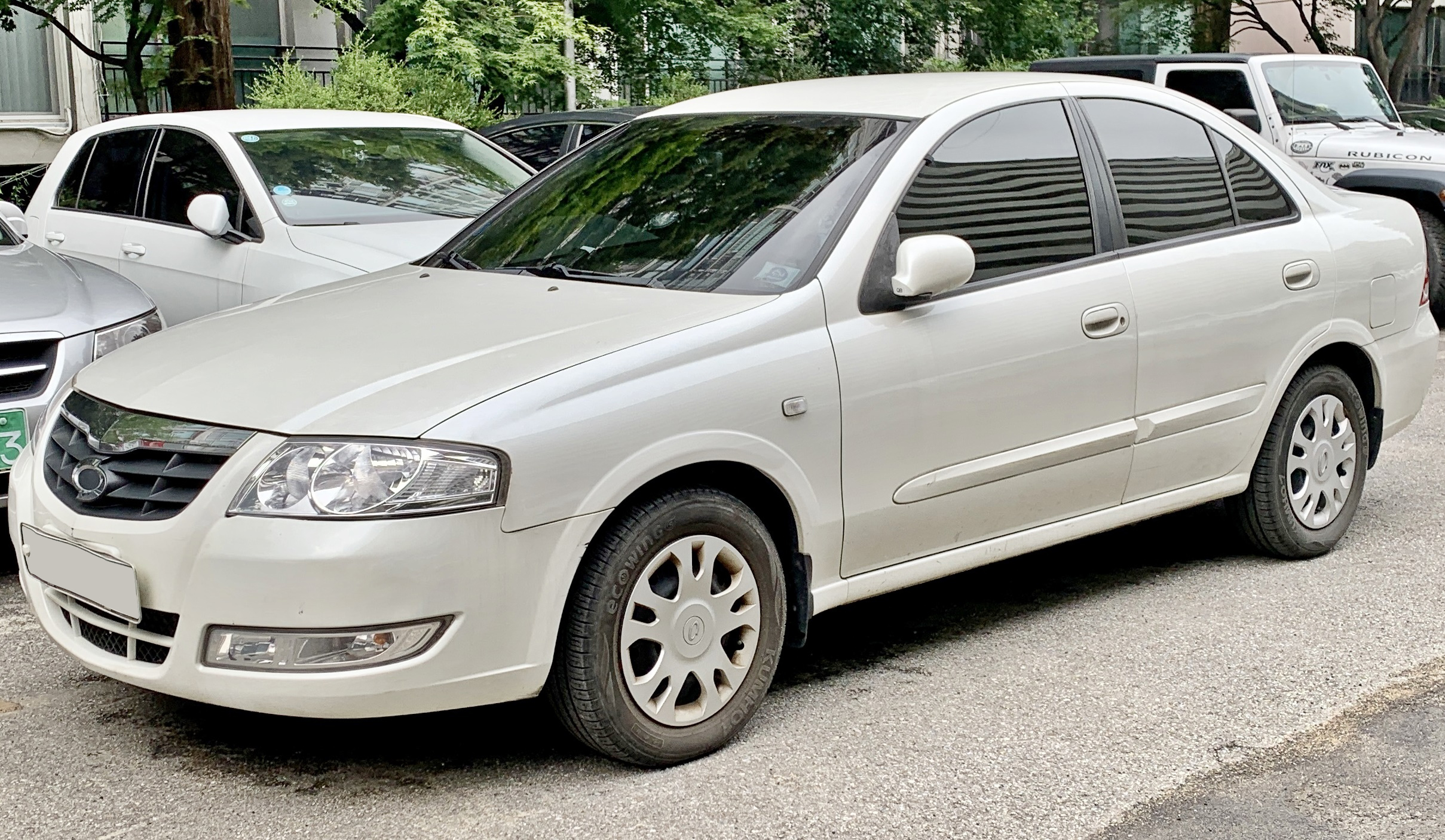
Renault Samsung SM3
