= T70 =

T70 or T-70 can refer to:

== Automobiles ==
- Lola T70, a British sports prototype car
- Maxus T70, a Chinese pickup truck
- Toyota Mark II (T70), a Japanese compact car
- Venucia T70, a Chinese crossover SUV
- Yema T70, a Chinese crossover SUV

== Military vehicles ==
- T-70, a Soviet tank
- Hunter T 70, a British-built trainer aircraft
- INS Chetlat (T70), a patrol vessel of the Indian Navy
- T70 GMC, an American prototype self-propelled gun

== Other uses ==
- T-70 (robot), a fictional robot in the Terminator franchise
- Canon T70, a film camera
- a type of X-wing fighter, a fictional vehicle in the Star Wars franchise
