= Yema T80 =

Compact crossover SUV

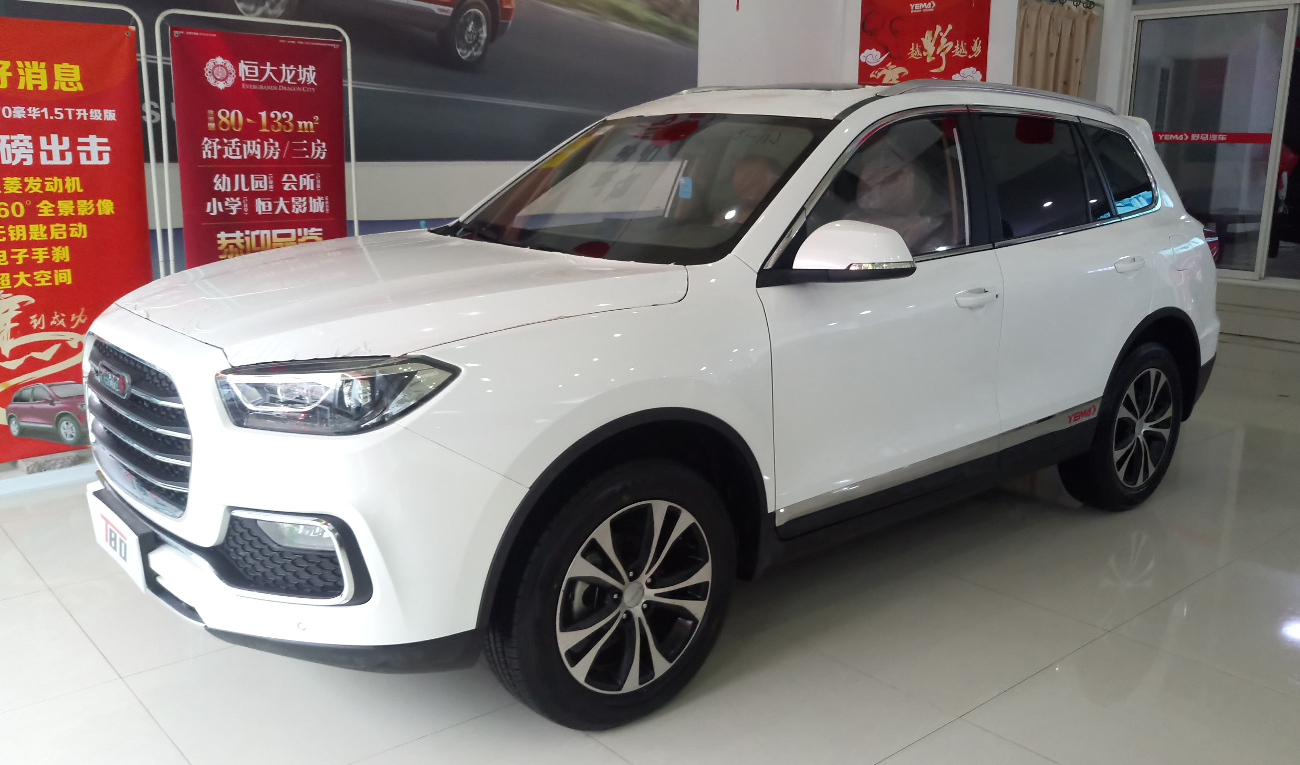

Overview
- Production: 2017–2020

Body and chassis
- Related: Yema T70

Powertrain
- Engine: Petrol: 1.5 L turbo I4; 2.0 L turbo I4
- Transmission: 5-speed manual 6-speed DCT

Dimensions
- Wheelbase: 2,665 mm (104.9 in)
- Length: 4,650 mm (183.1 in)
- Width: 1,835 mm (72.2 in)
- Height: 1,715 mm (67.5 in)

The Yema T80 is a compact crossover SUV produced by Chinese automaker Yema Auto from 2017 to 2020. The Yema T80 debuted during the 2016 Chengdu Auto Show in China, and was launched in China in 7 March 2017.

== Overview ==
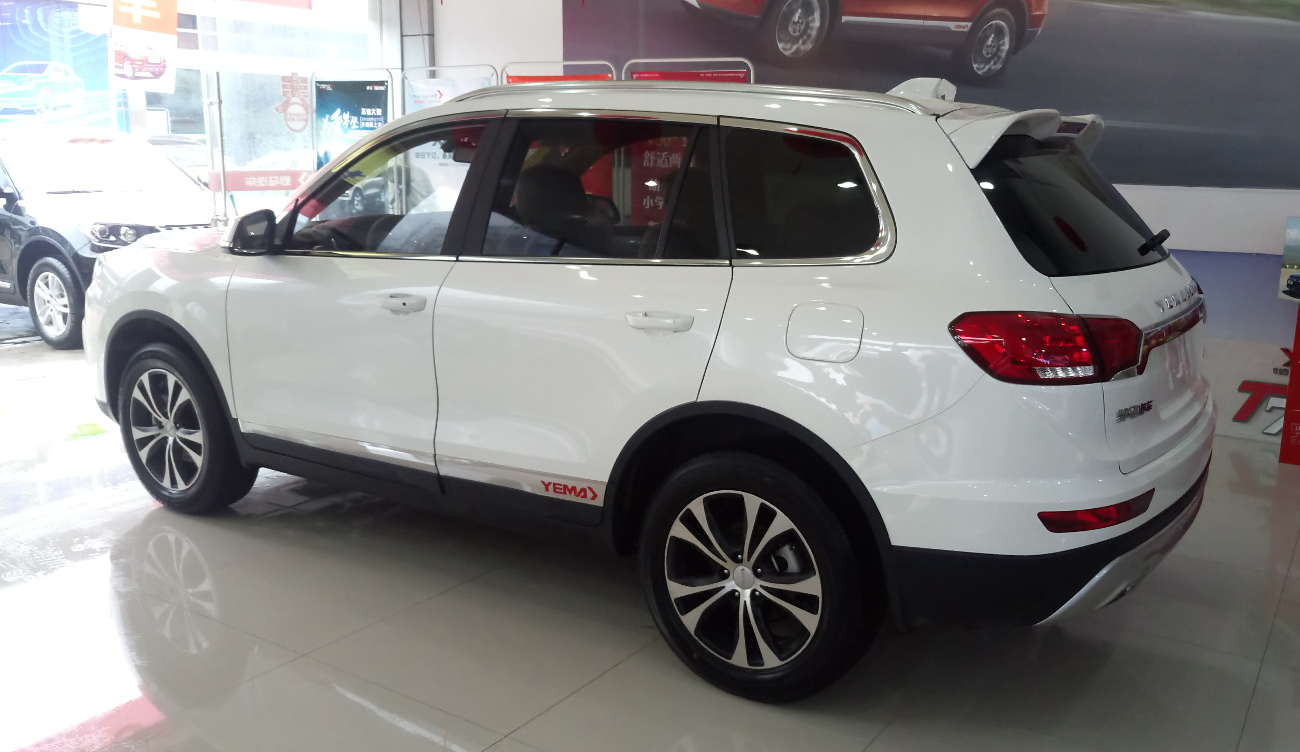
Yema T80 rear

The T80 stands on a slightly stretched variant of the same platform that also underpins the Yema T70, making the design also similar to the T70.

Engine options include a 150 hp (112 kW; 152 PS) 1.5-liter turbo engine mated to a five-speed manual gearbox and a 218 hp (163 kW; 221 PS) 2.0-liter turbo engine mated to a 6-speed DCT, with only front-wheel drive available throughout the product line like the T70.

Prices for the Yema T80 ranges from 89,800 yuan to 129,800 yuan.
