= Renault–Nissan C platform =

Renault-Nissan C platform

Overview
- Manufacturer: Renault–Nissan Alliance
- Production: 2003-2022; 2005-present (Nissan Serena)

Body and chassis
- Class: Compact cars
- Layout: FF; F4
- Body style: Various

Chronology
- Predecessor: Nissan MS platform
- Successor: Renault–Nissan Common Module Family C/D

The Renault/Nissan C is an automobile platform for front wheel drive automobiles. Production Nissans on this platform began to surface in 2004, with the Japanese-market 7-seater Lafesta.

The first generation Nissan Tiida/Tiida Latio, whose size falls in the C-segment, instead uses a stretched Nissan B platform.

== Vehicles ==
=== Renault ===
- 2002 Renault Mégane Mk.II
- 2003 Renault Scénic Mk.II
- 2006 Renault Koleos
- 2008 Renault Mégane Mk.III
- 2007 Renault Kangoo Mk.II
- 2012 Mercedes-Benz Citan
- 2009 Renault Scénic Mk.III
- 2009 Renault Fluence
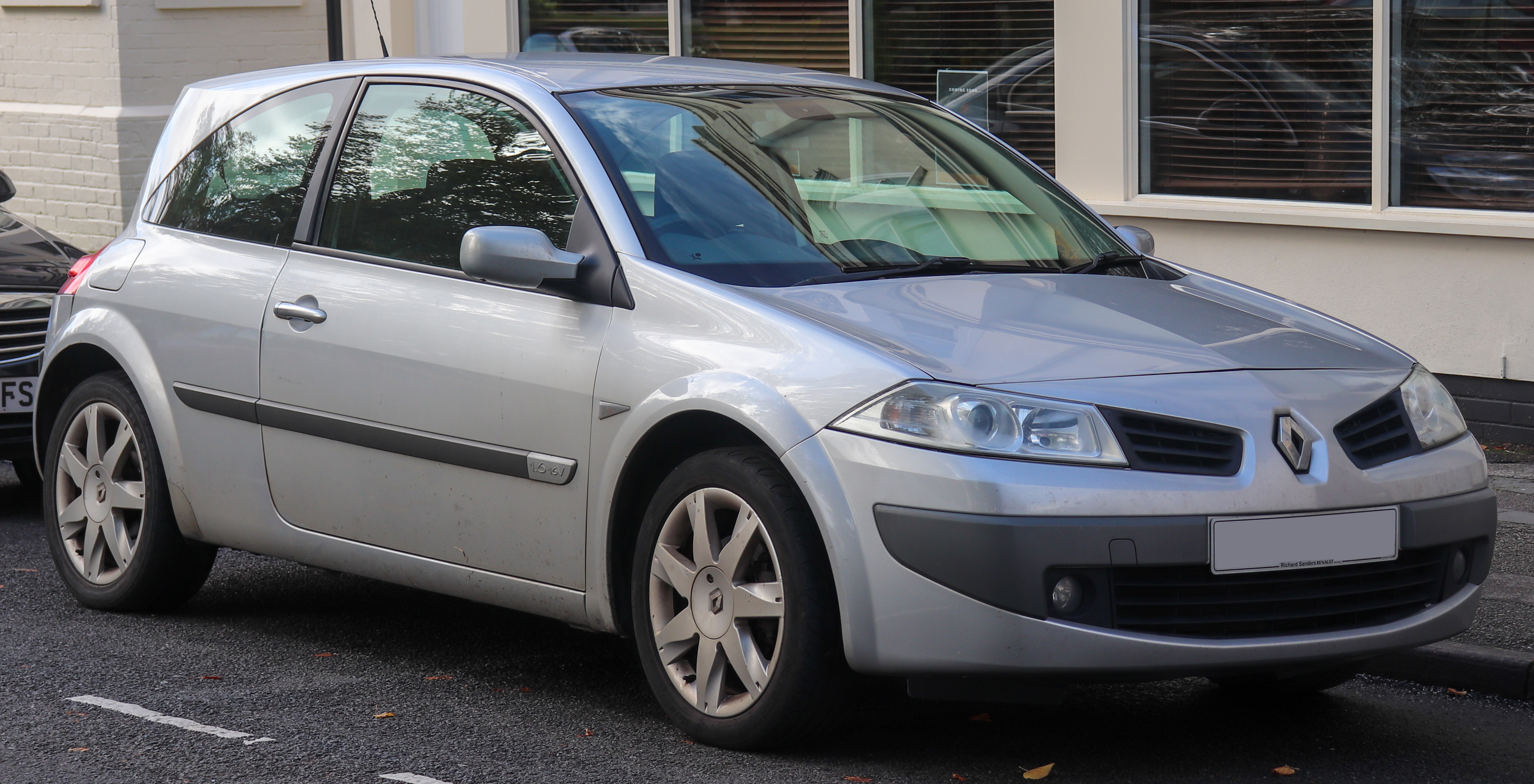
Renault Mégane II

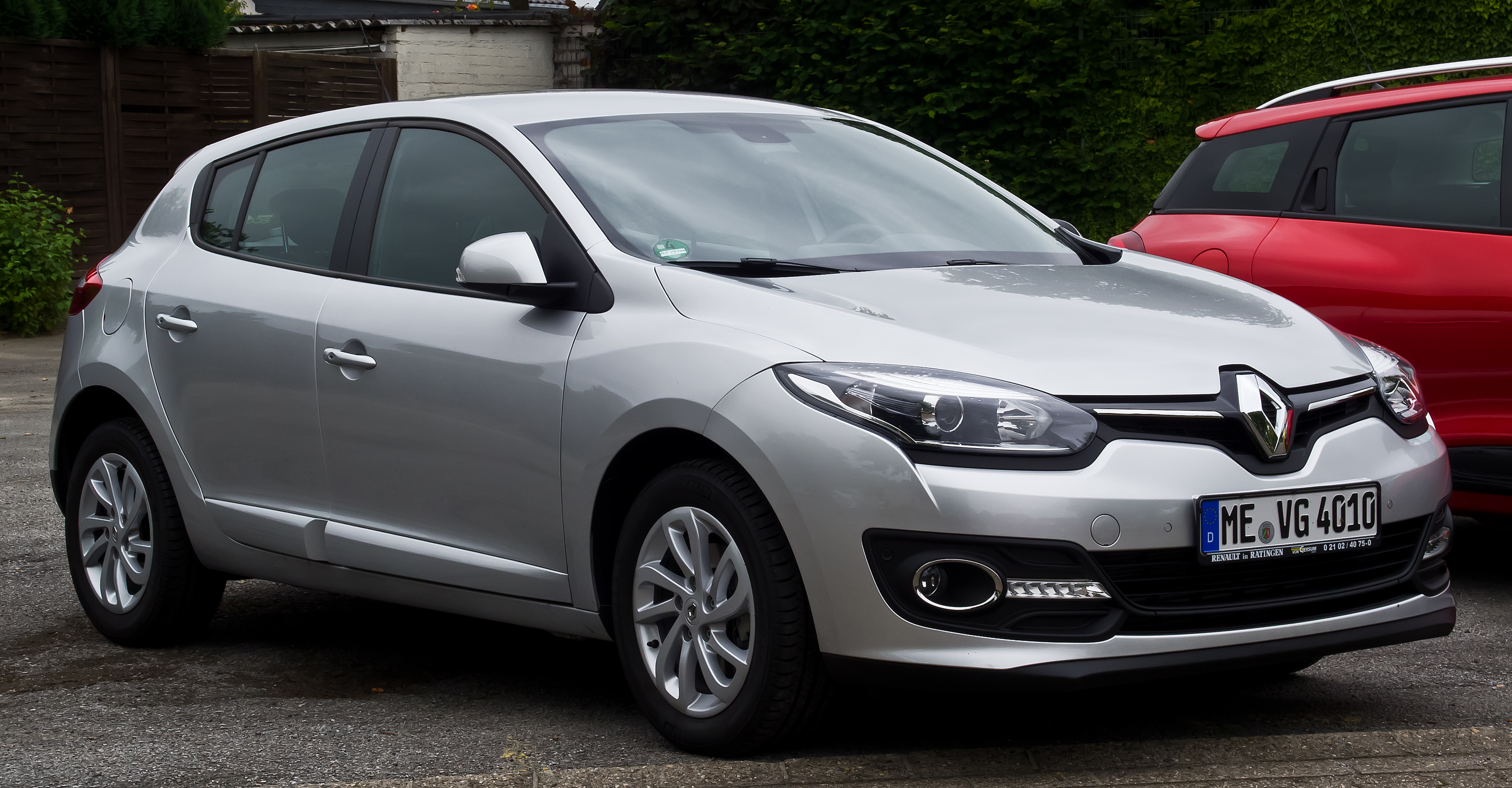
Renault Mégane III

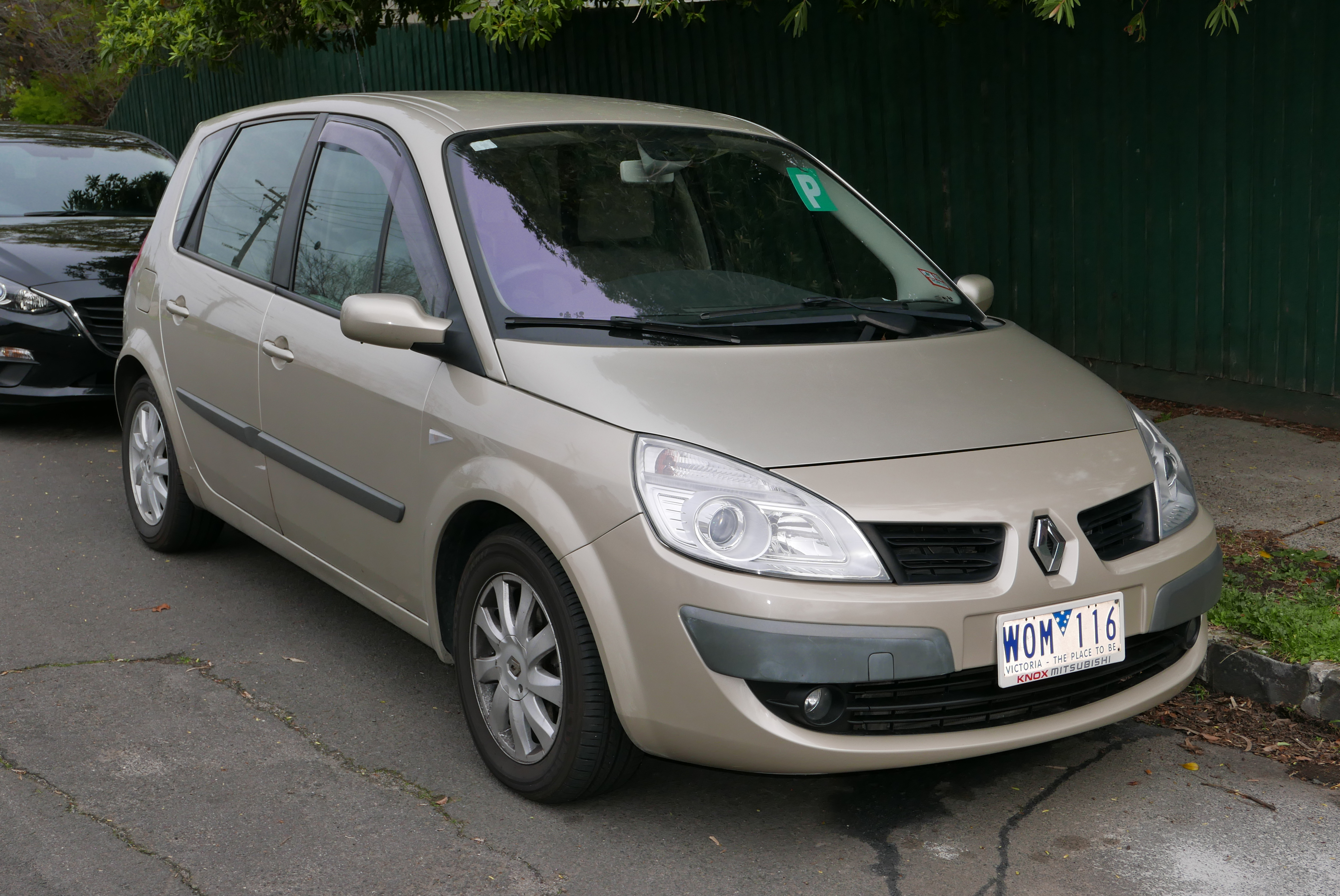
Renault Scénic II

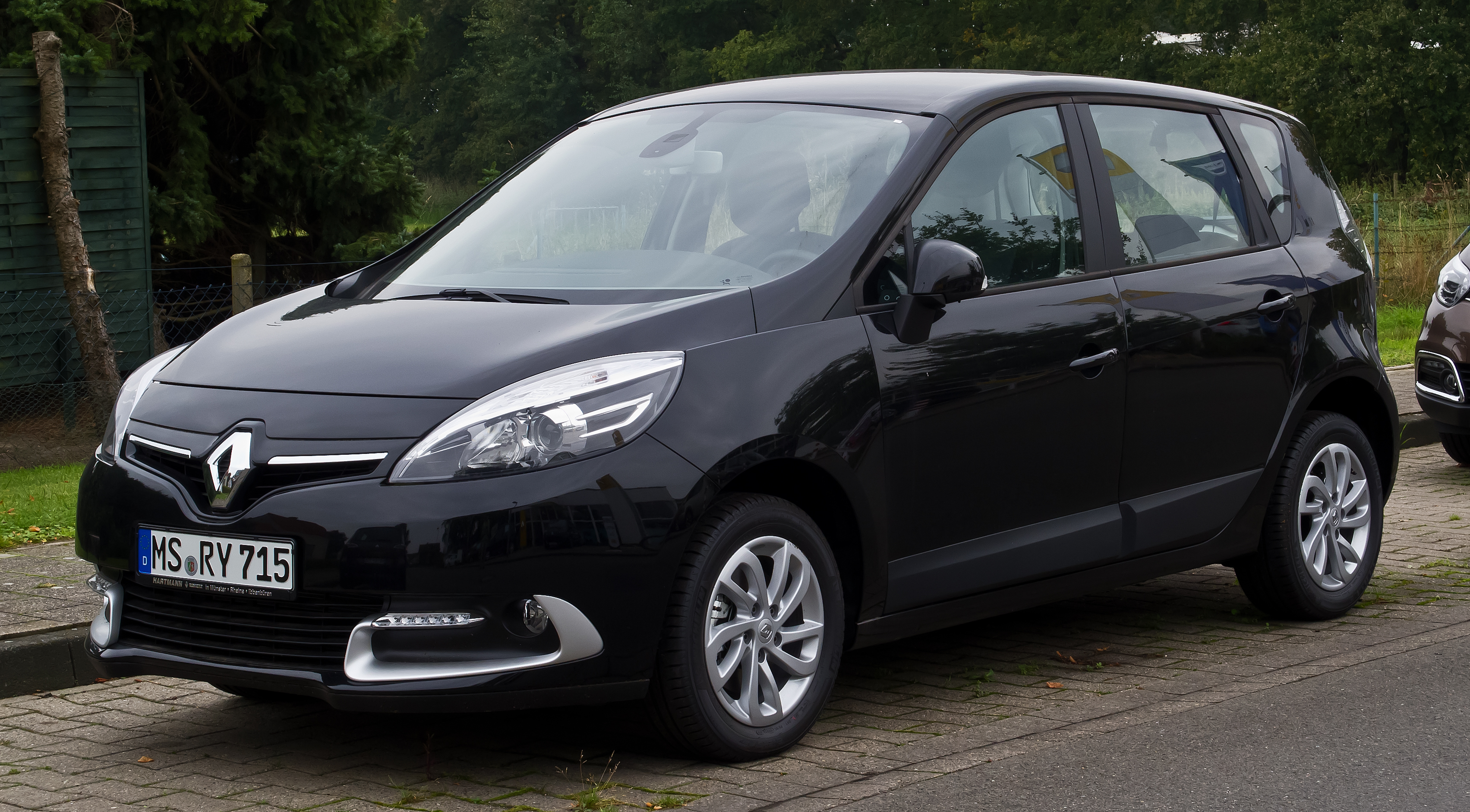
Renault Scénic III

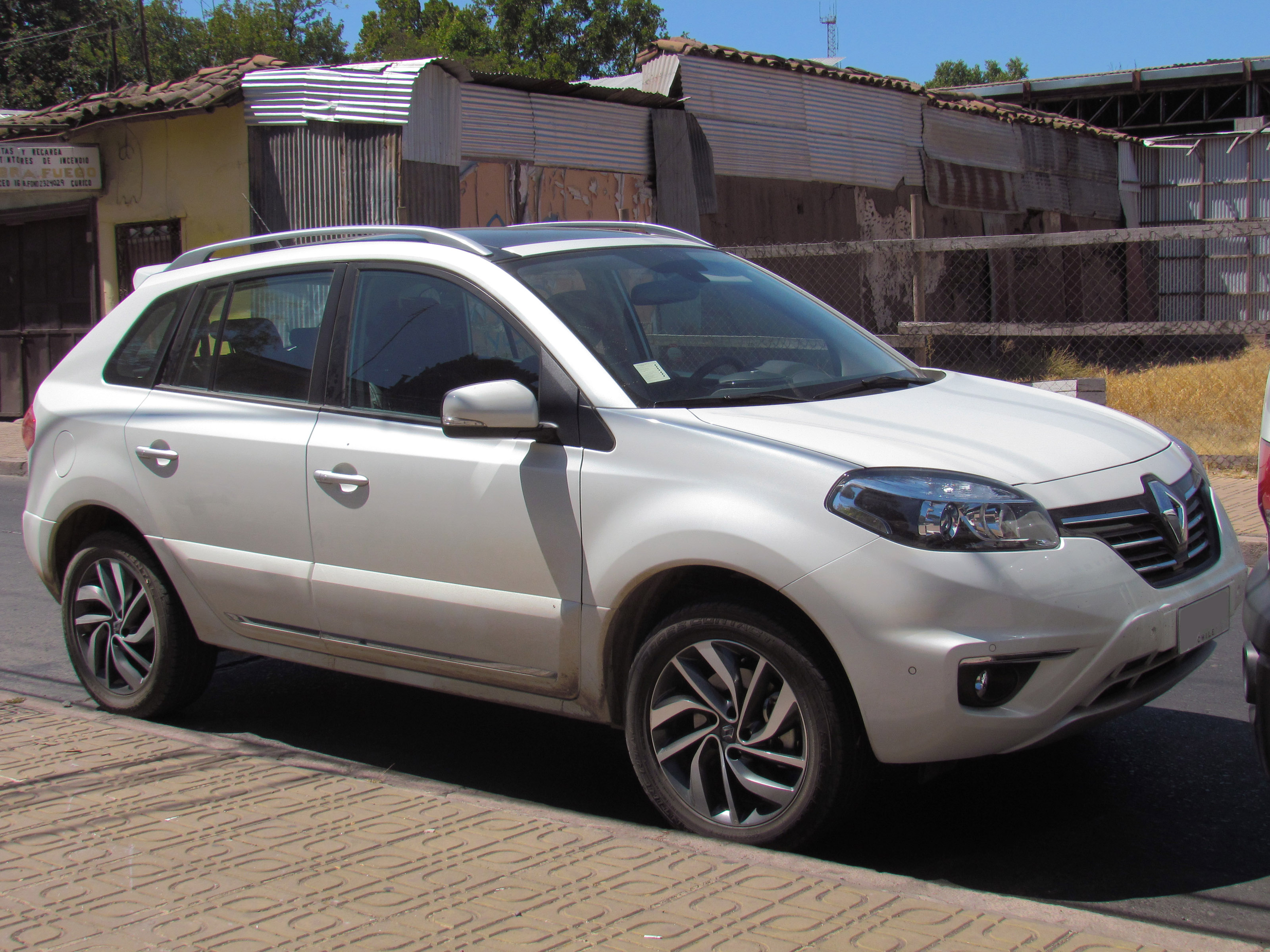
Renault Koleos

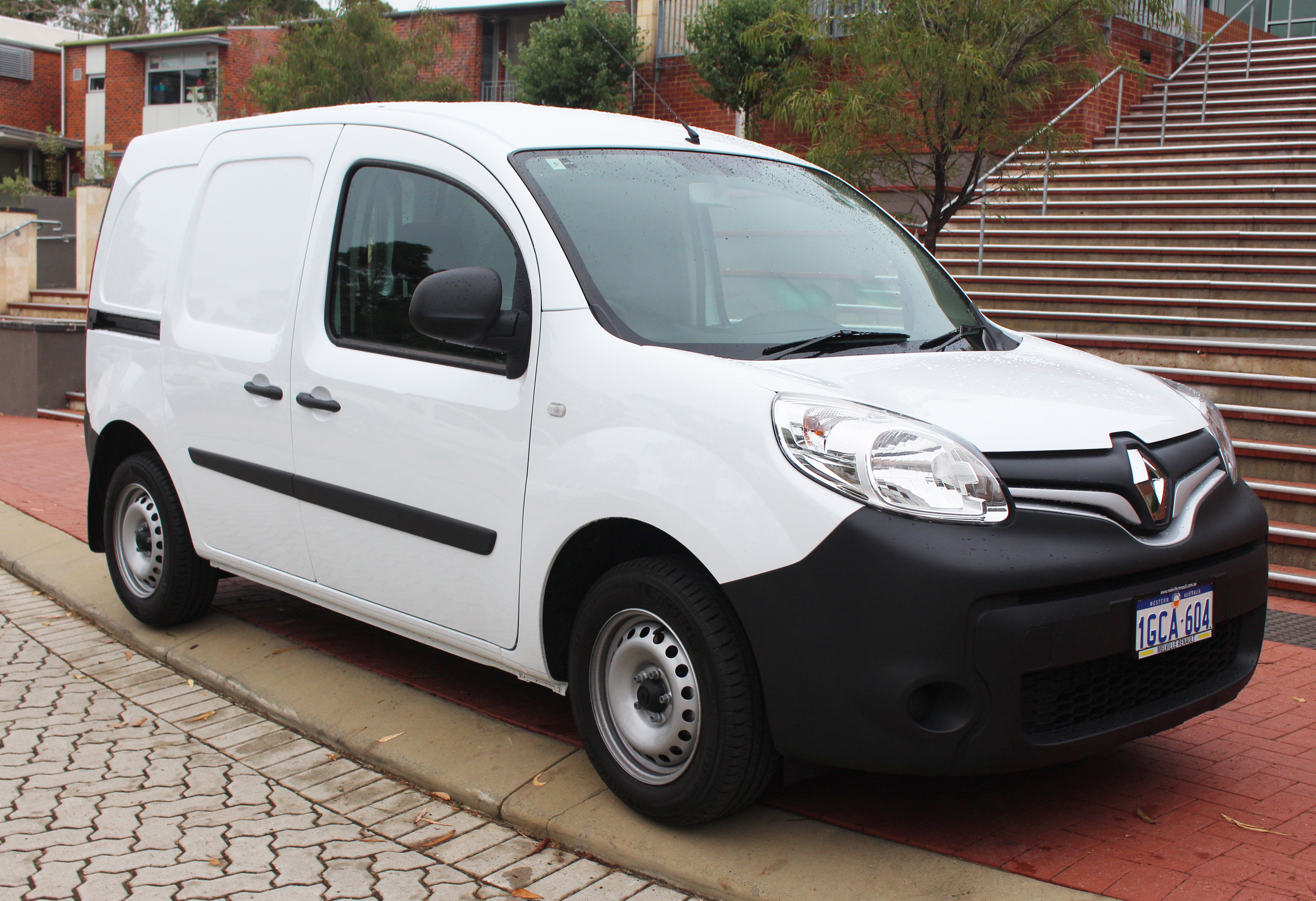
Renault Kangoo II

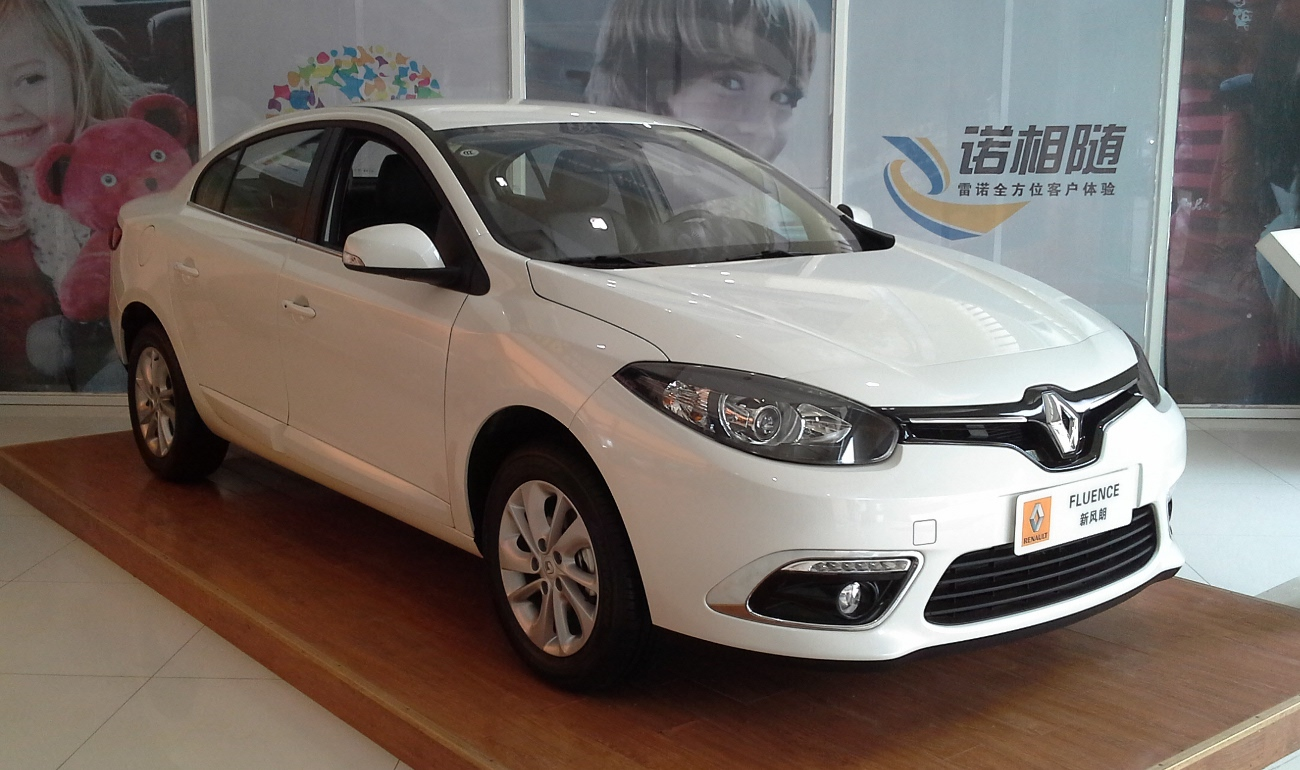
Renault Fluence

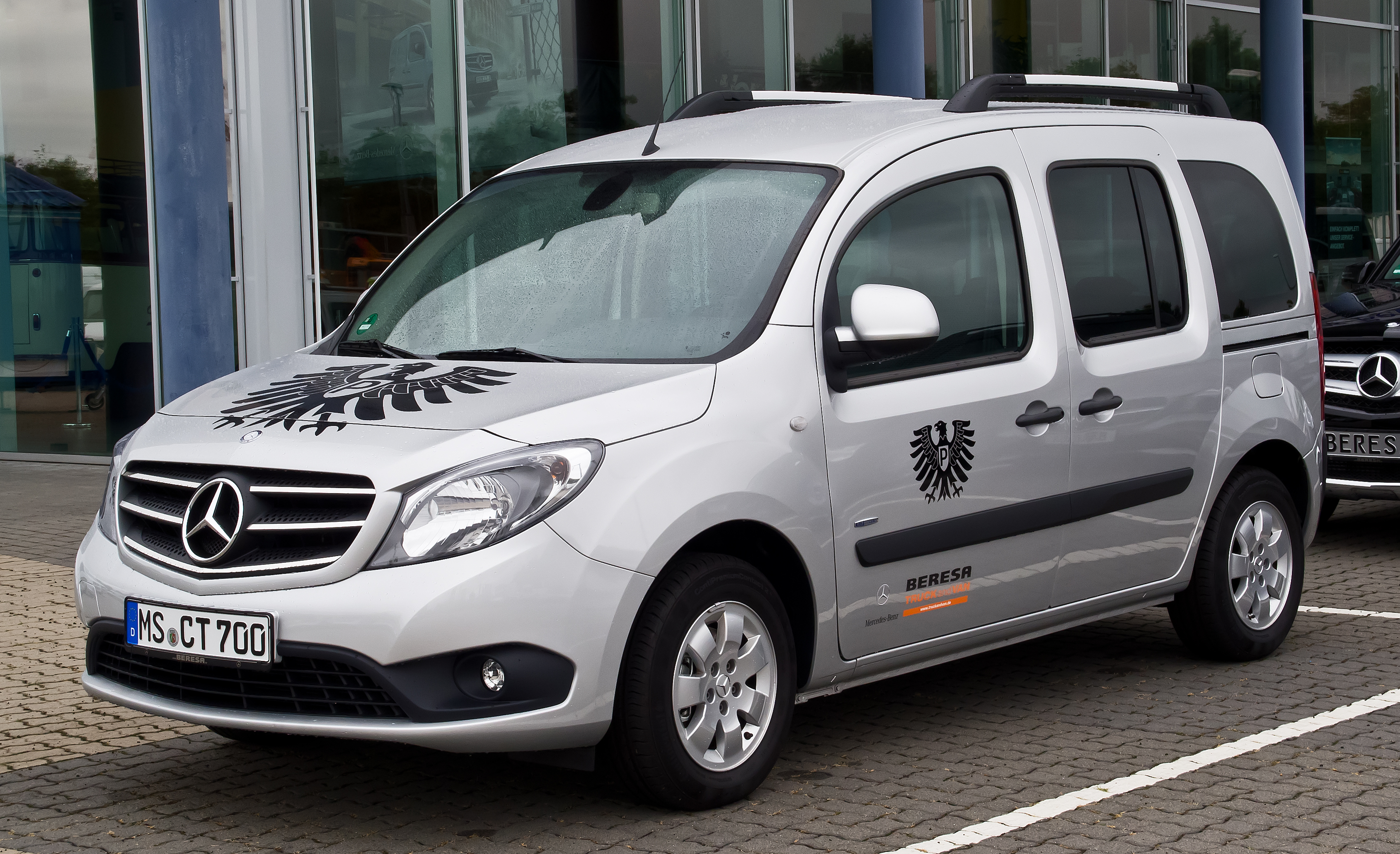
Mercedes-Benz Citan

=== Nissan ===
- 2004 Nissan Lafesta B30
- 2005 Nissan Serena/Suzuki Landy C25 C26 C27 C28
- 2006 Nissan Qashqai J10
- 2007 Nissan Sentra B16
- 2007 Nissan X-Trail T31
- 2008 Nissan Rogue S35
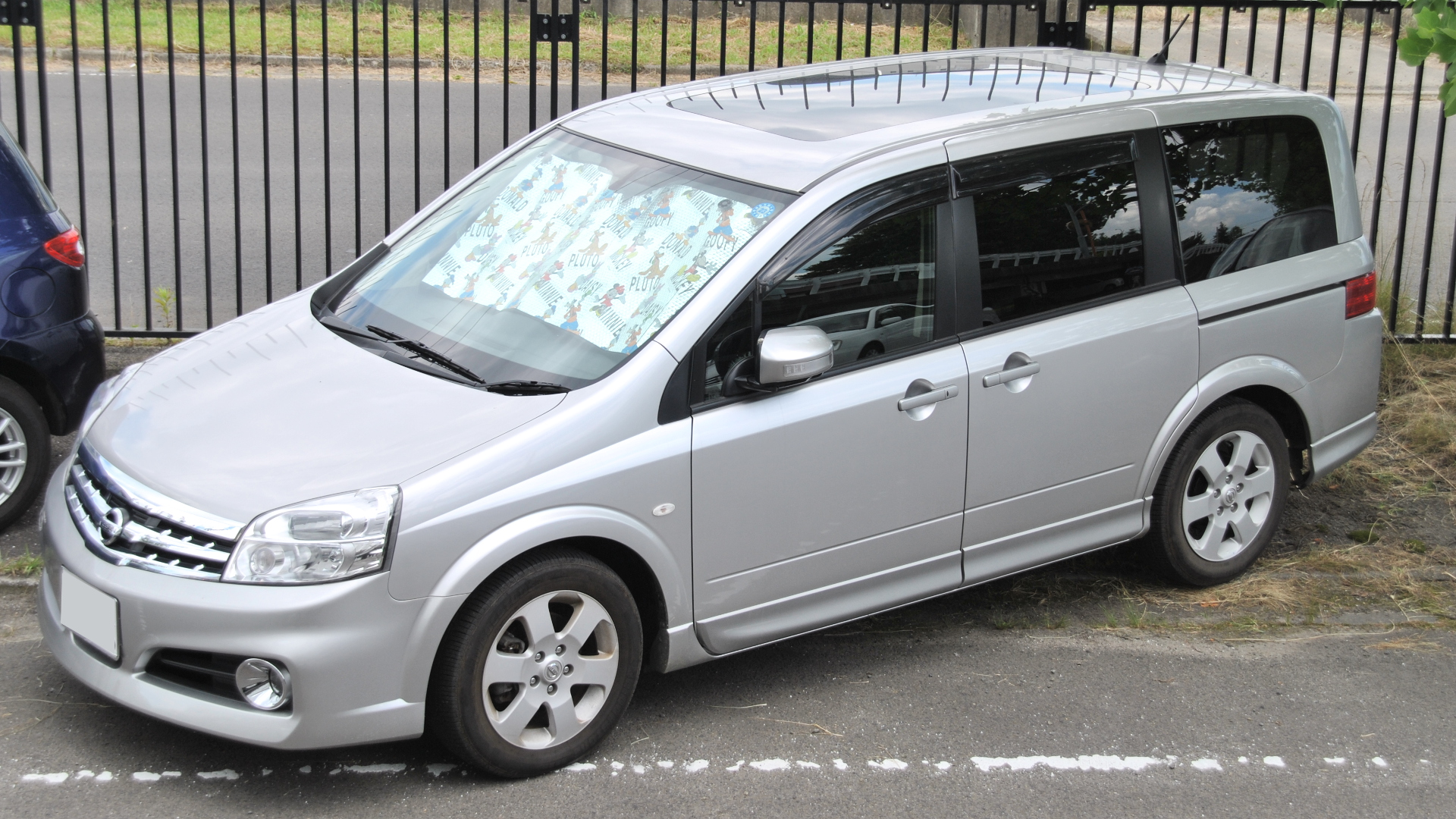
Nissan Lafesta B30

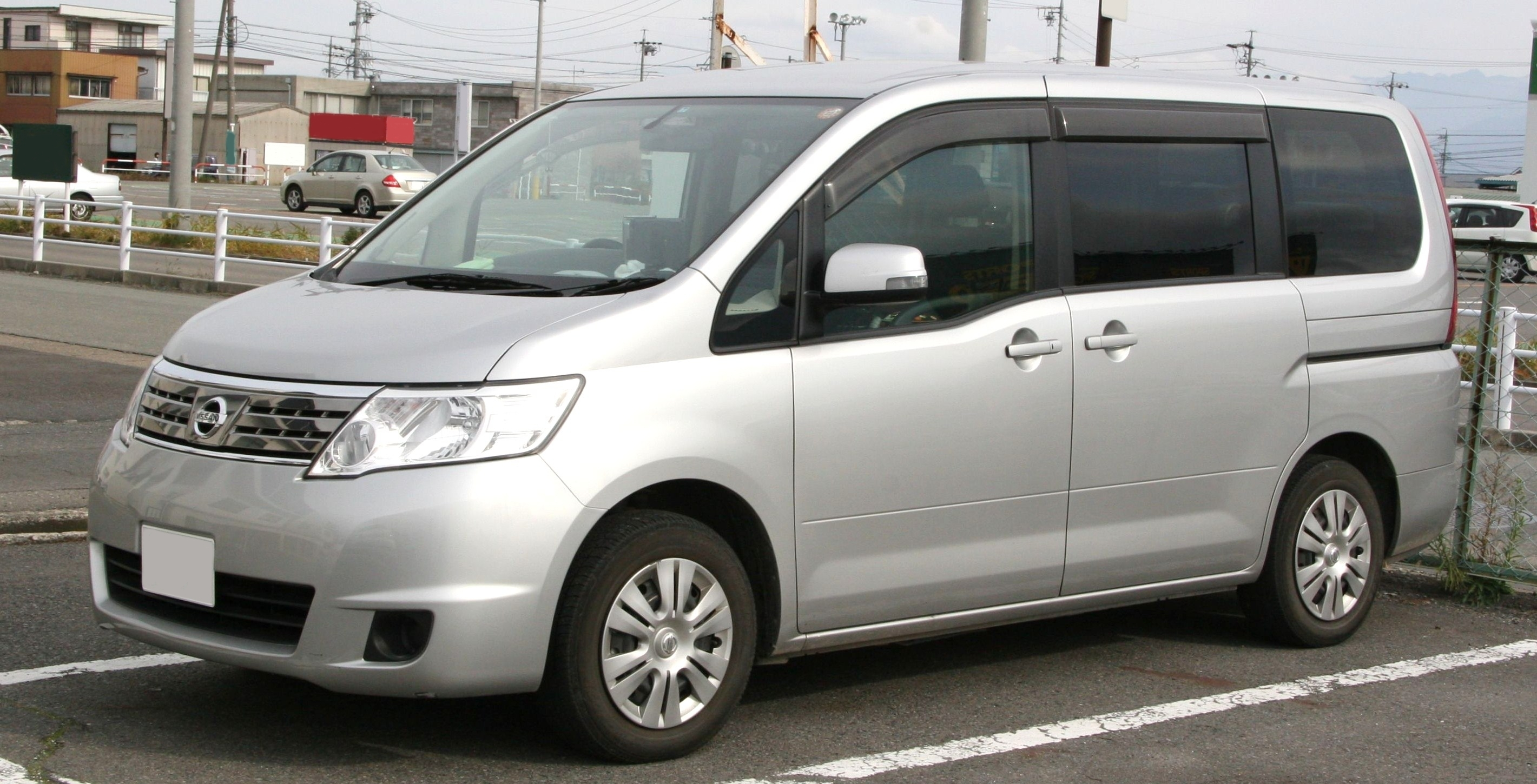
Nissan Serena C25

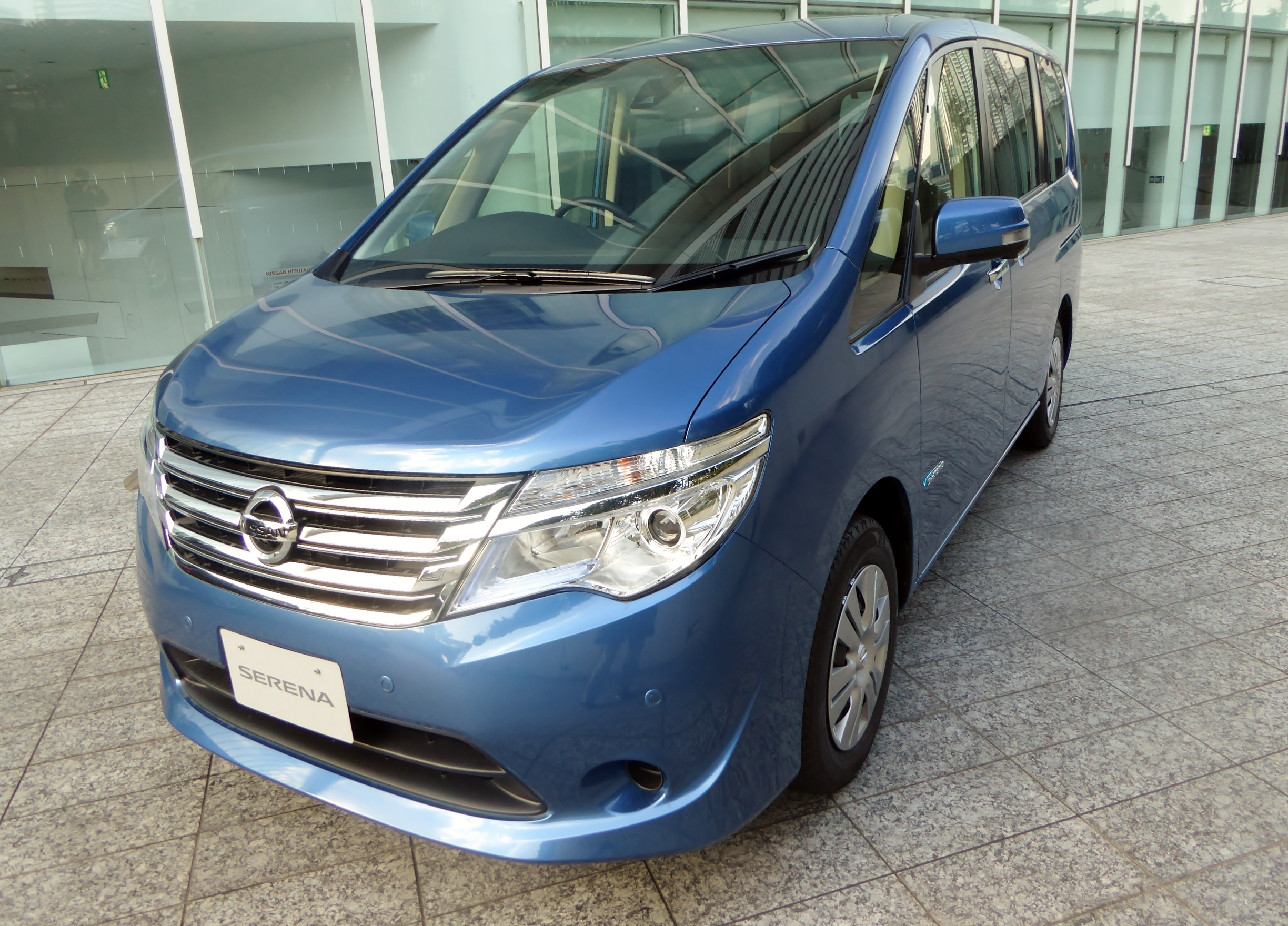
Nissan Serena C26

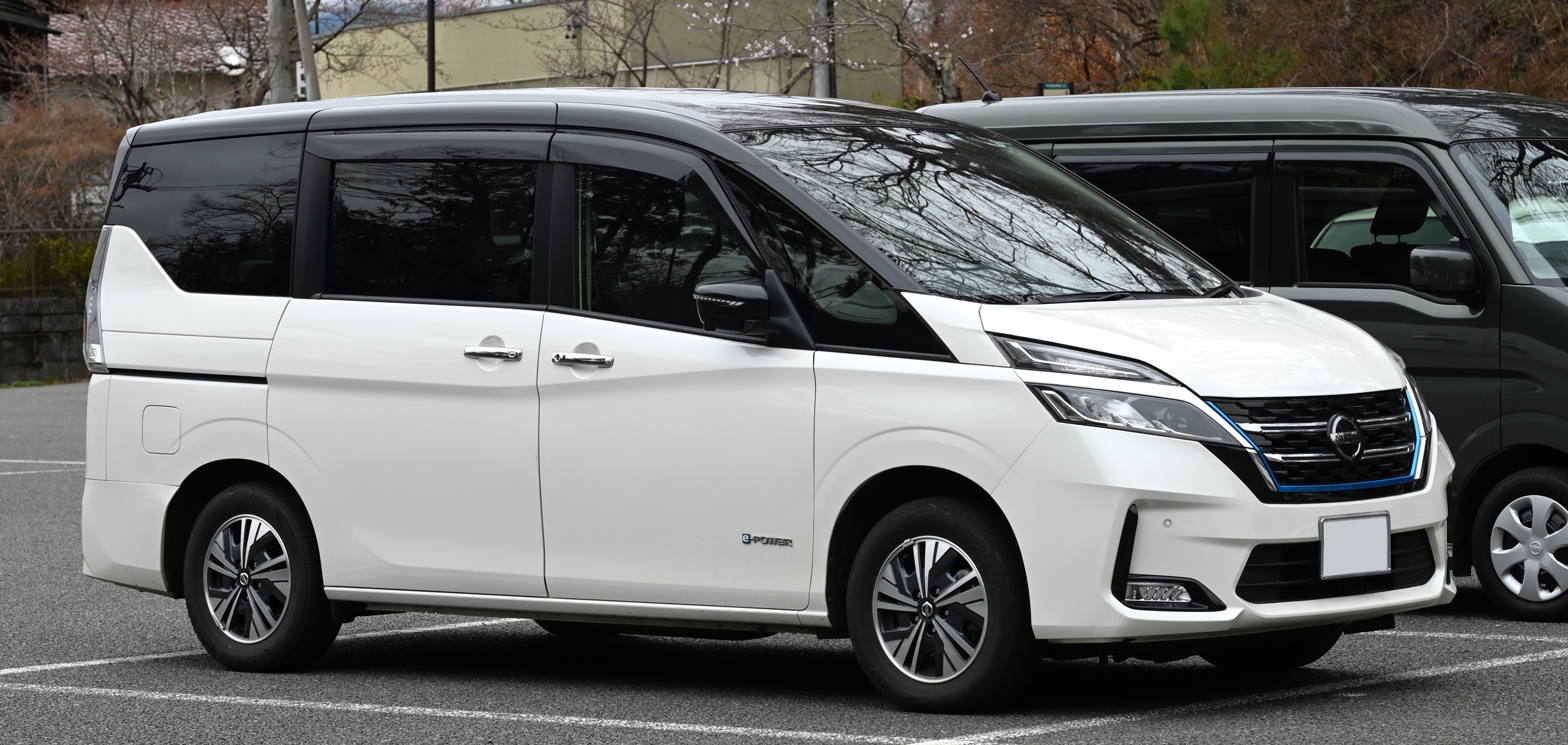
Nissan Serena C27

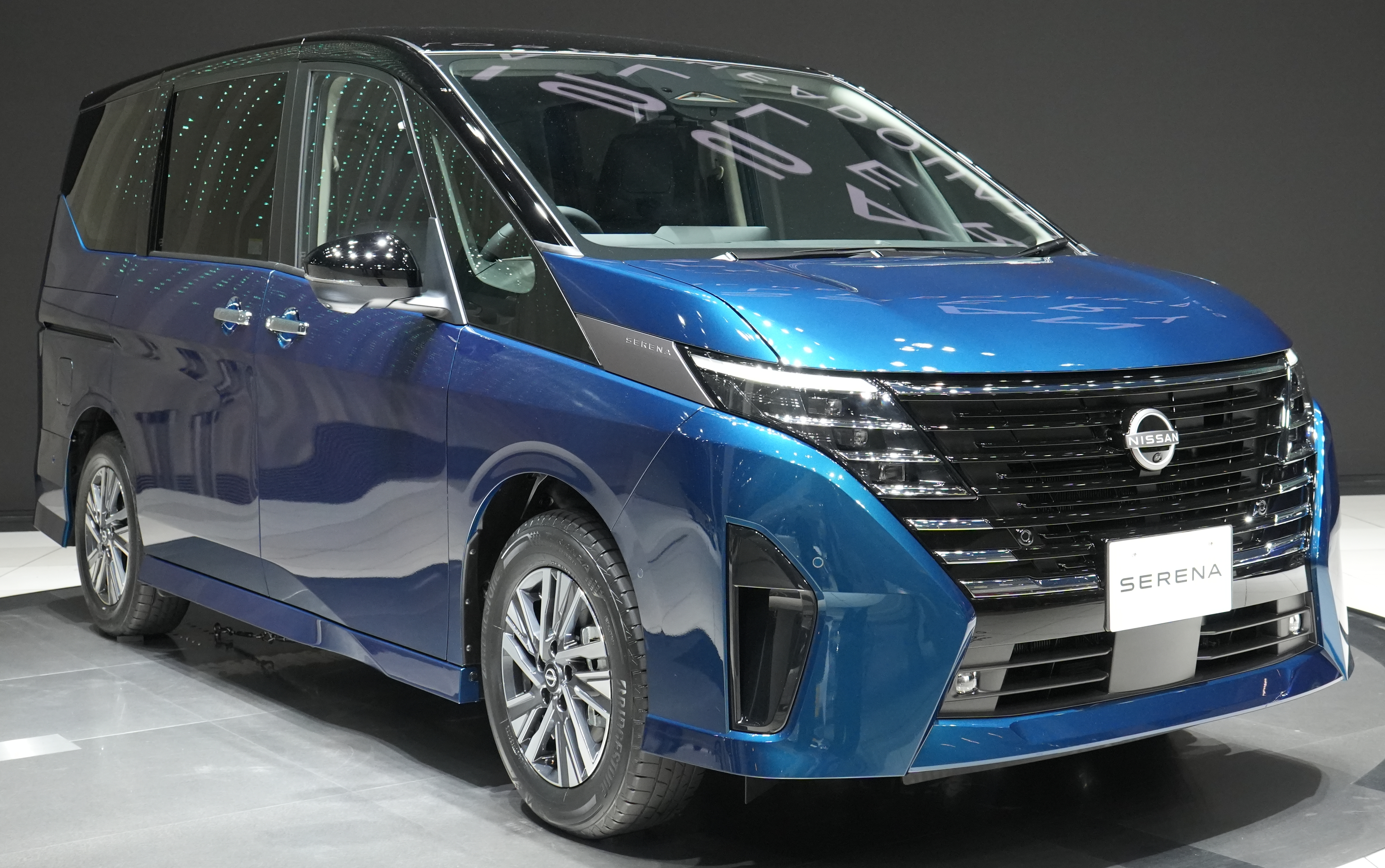
Nissan Serena C28

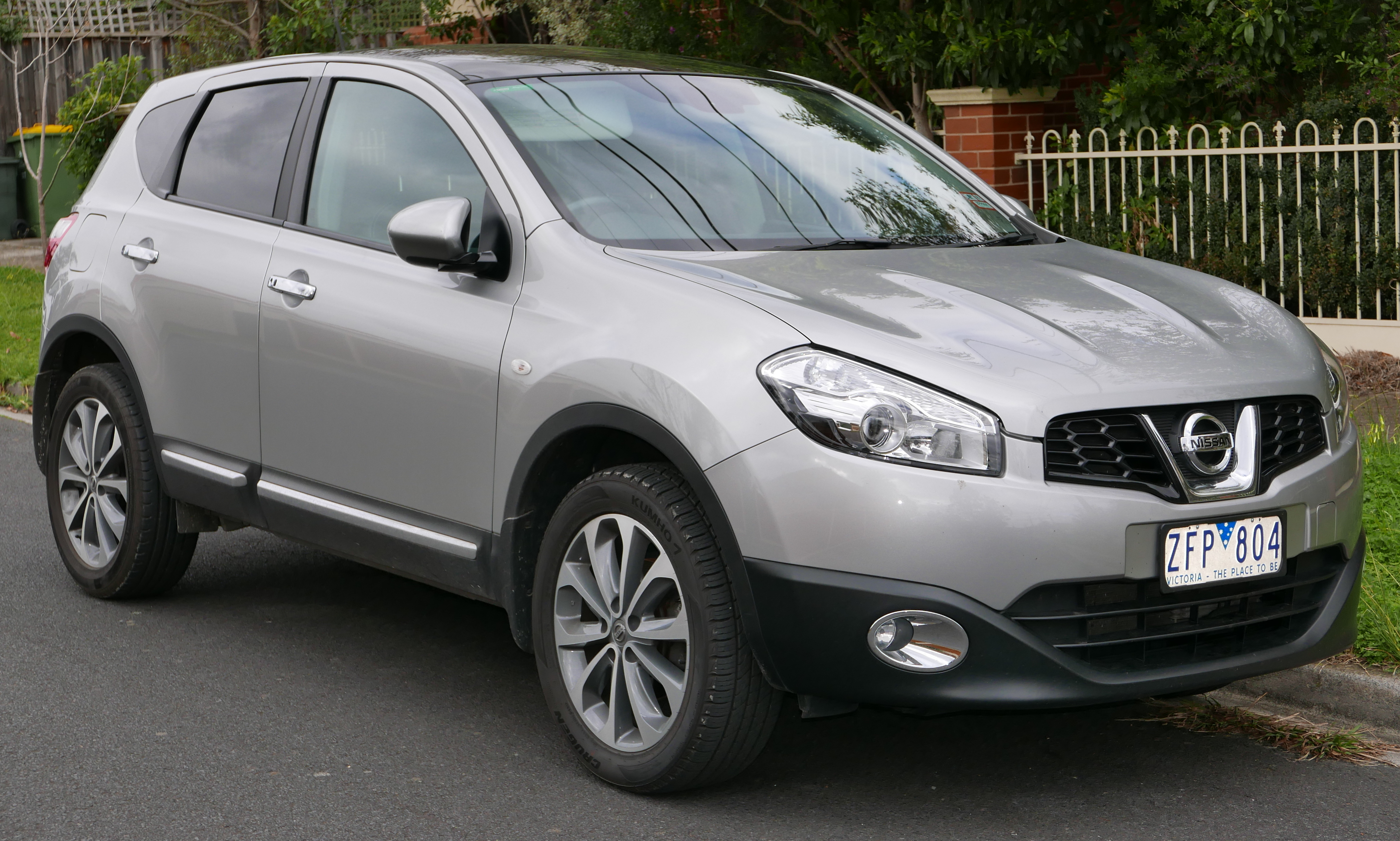
Nissan Qashqai J10

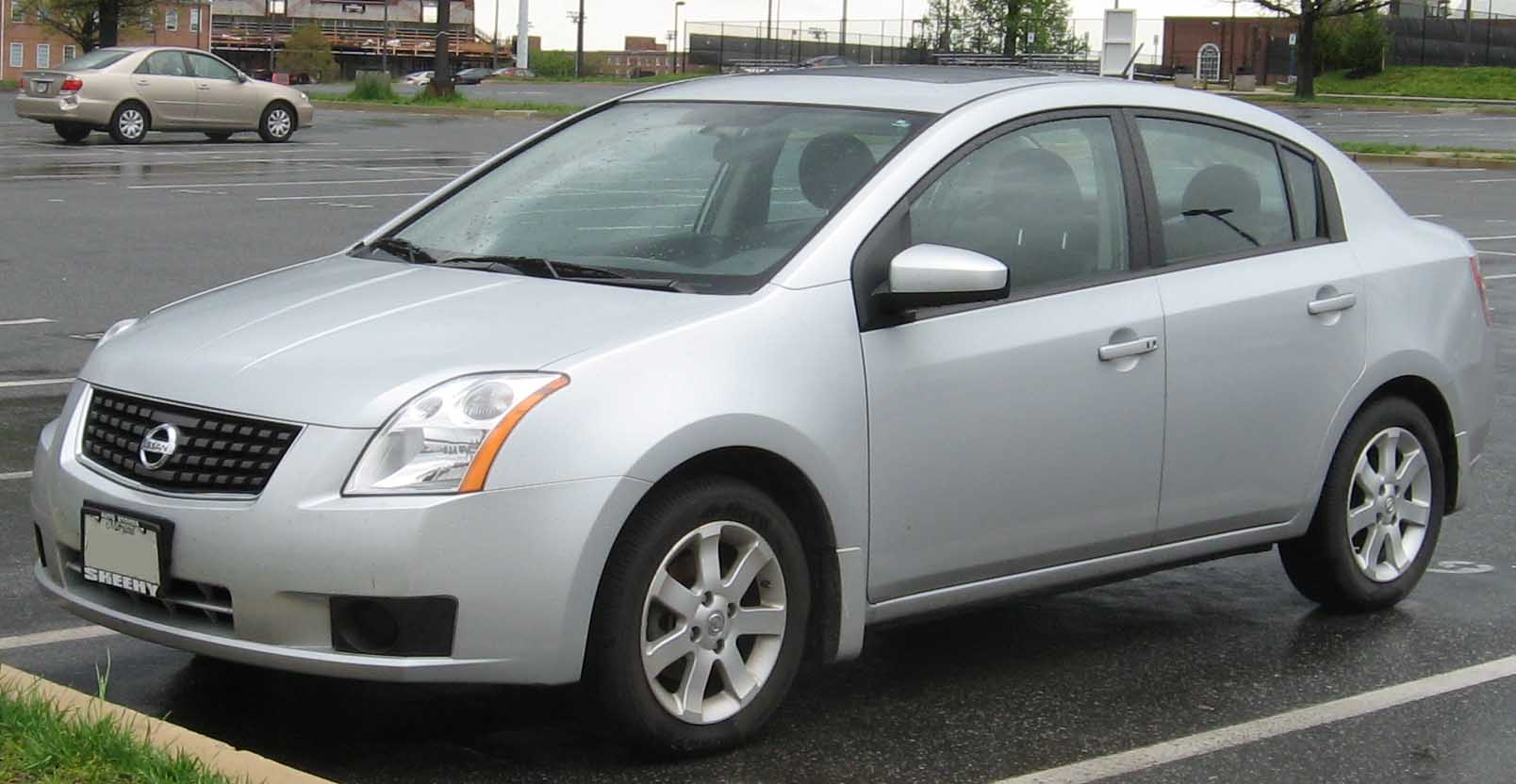
Nissan Sentra B16

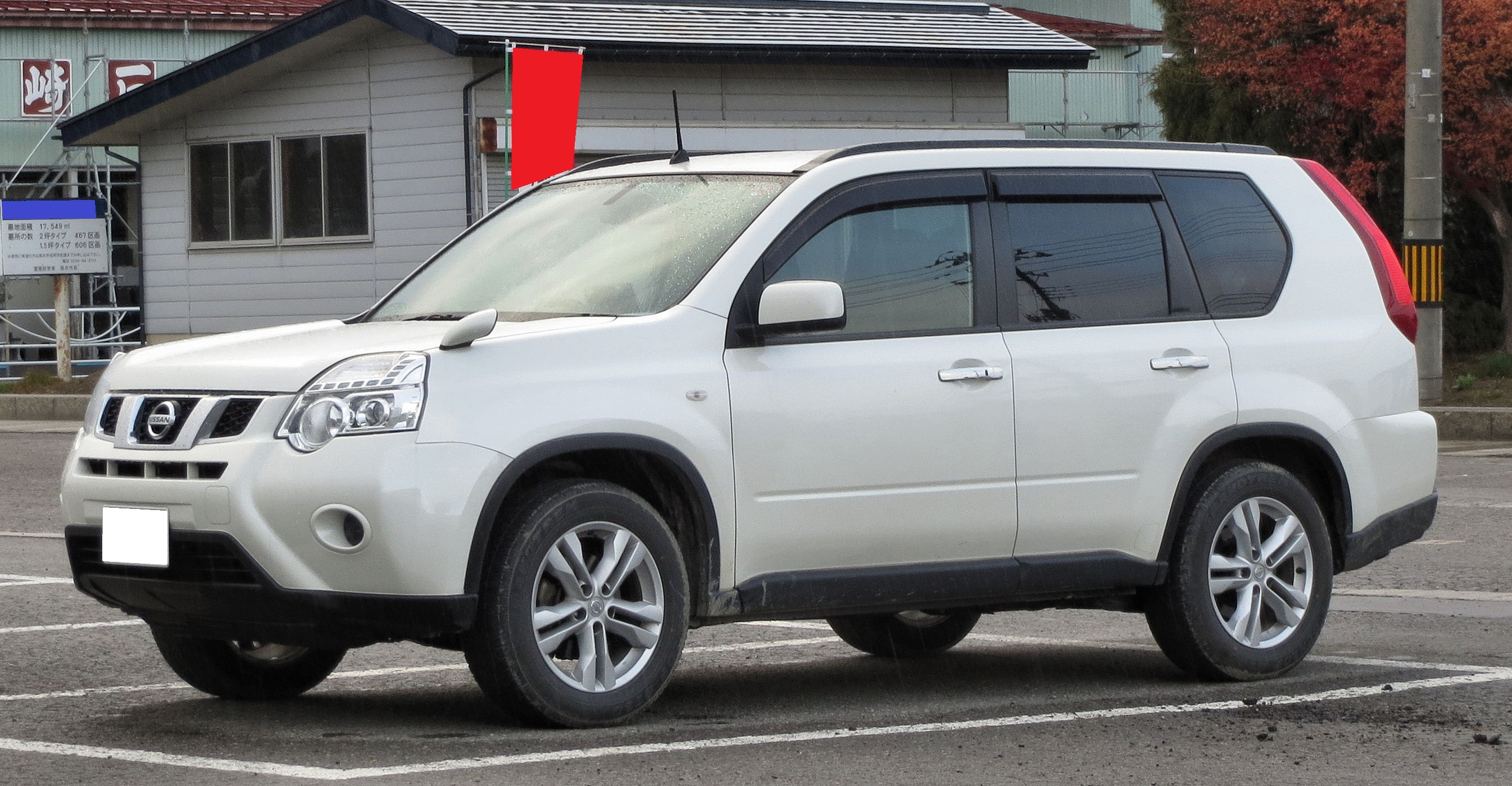
Nissan X-Trail T31

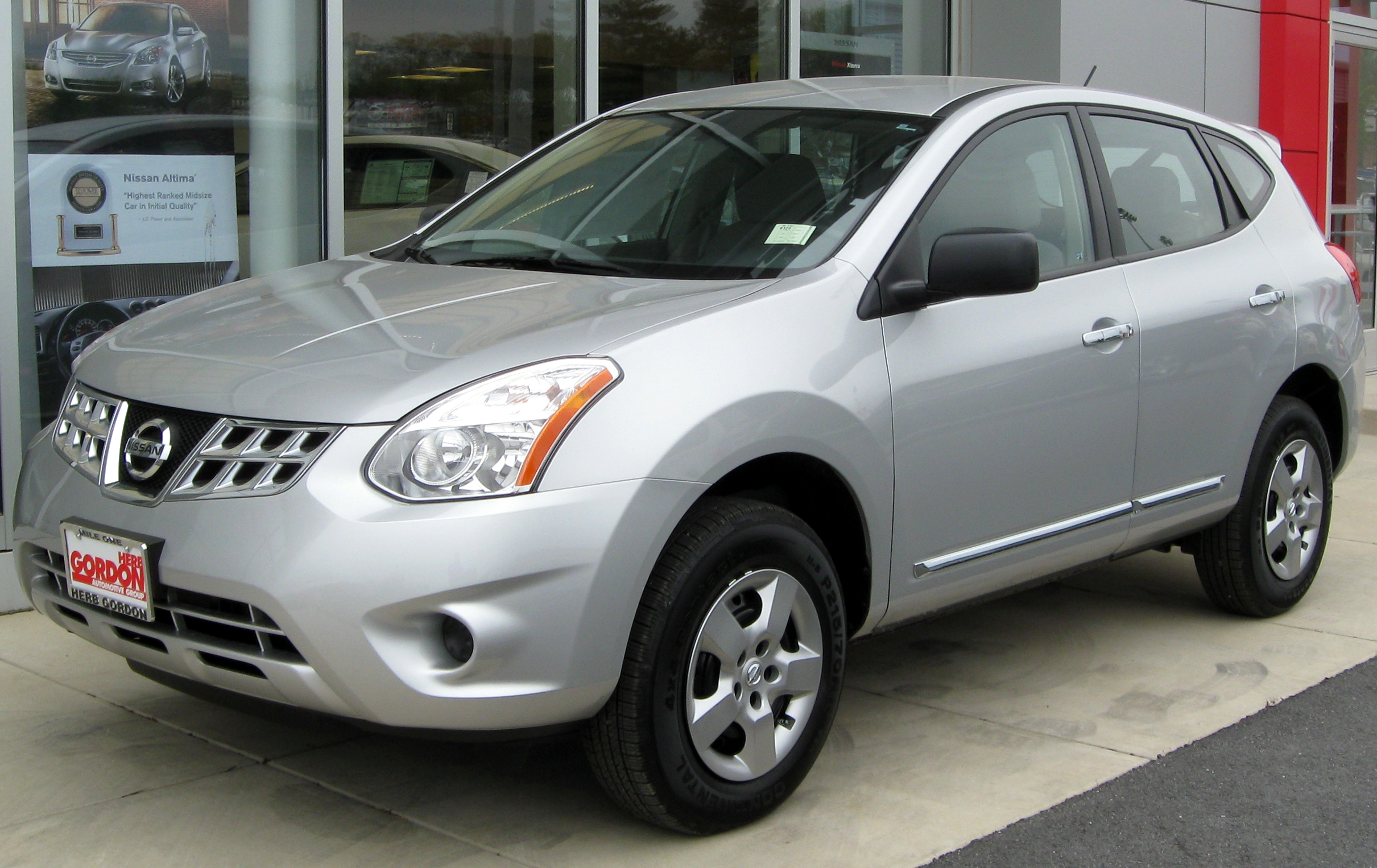
Nissan Rogue S35

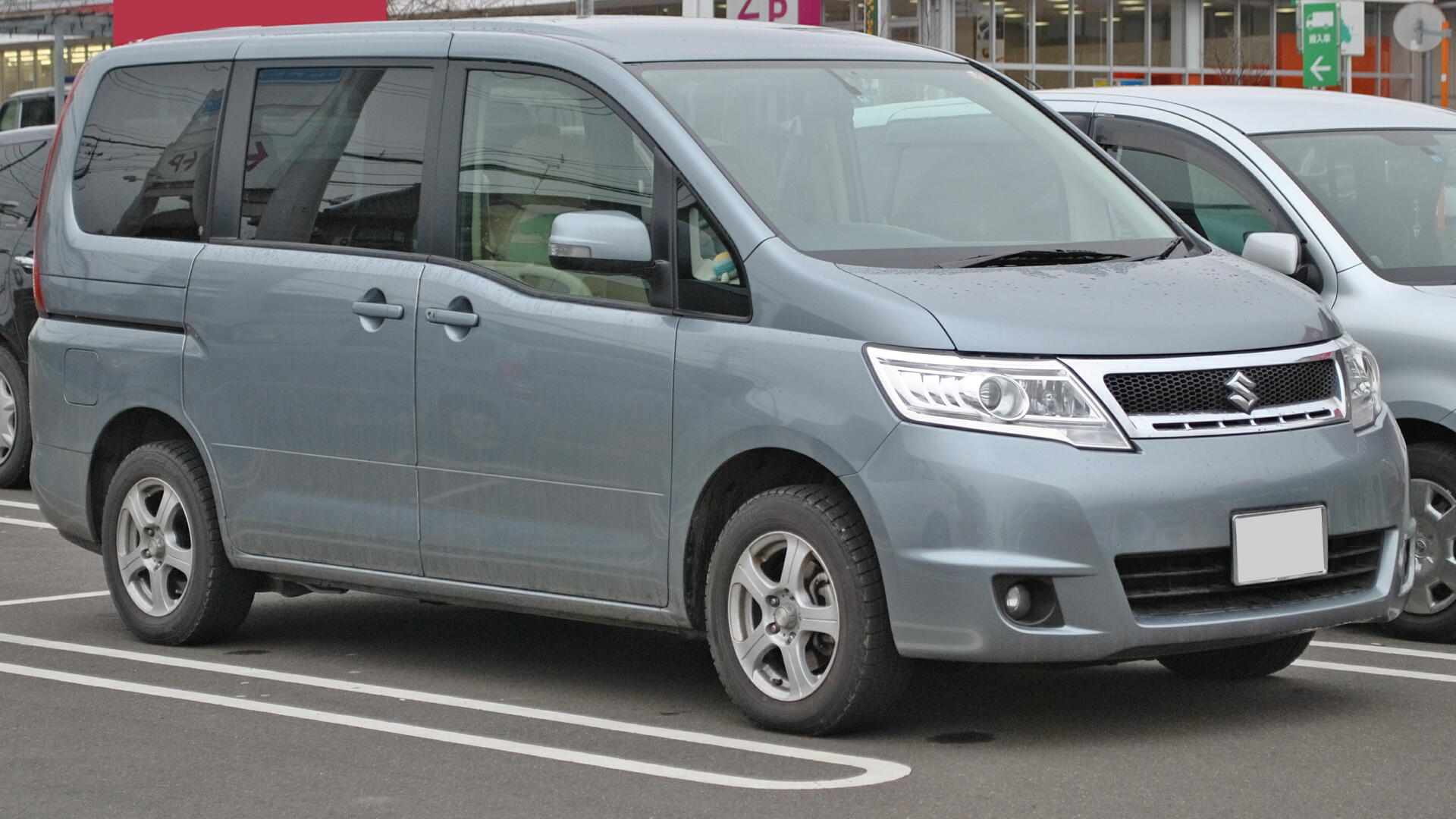
Suzuki Landy C25

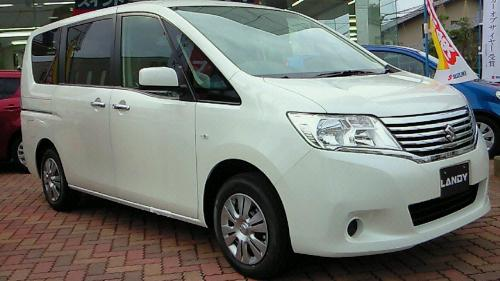
Suzuki Landy C26

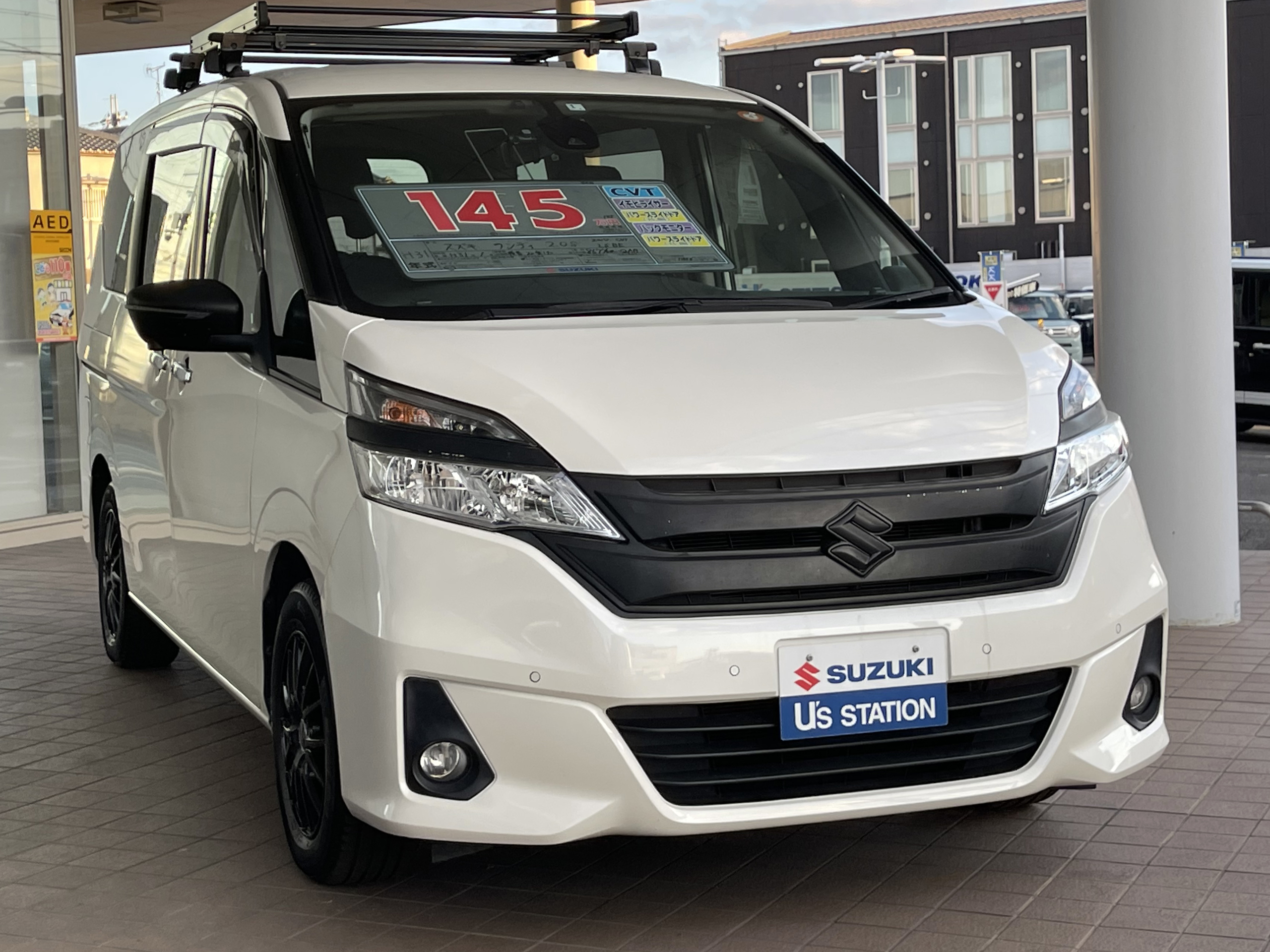
Suzuki Landy C27

=== Venucia ===
- 2014 Venucia T70
- 2015 Venucia T70X
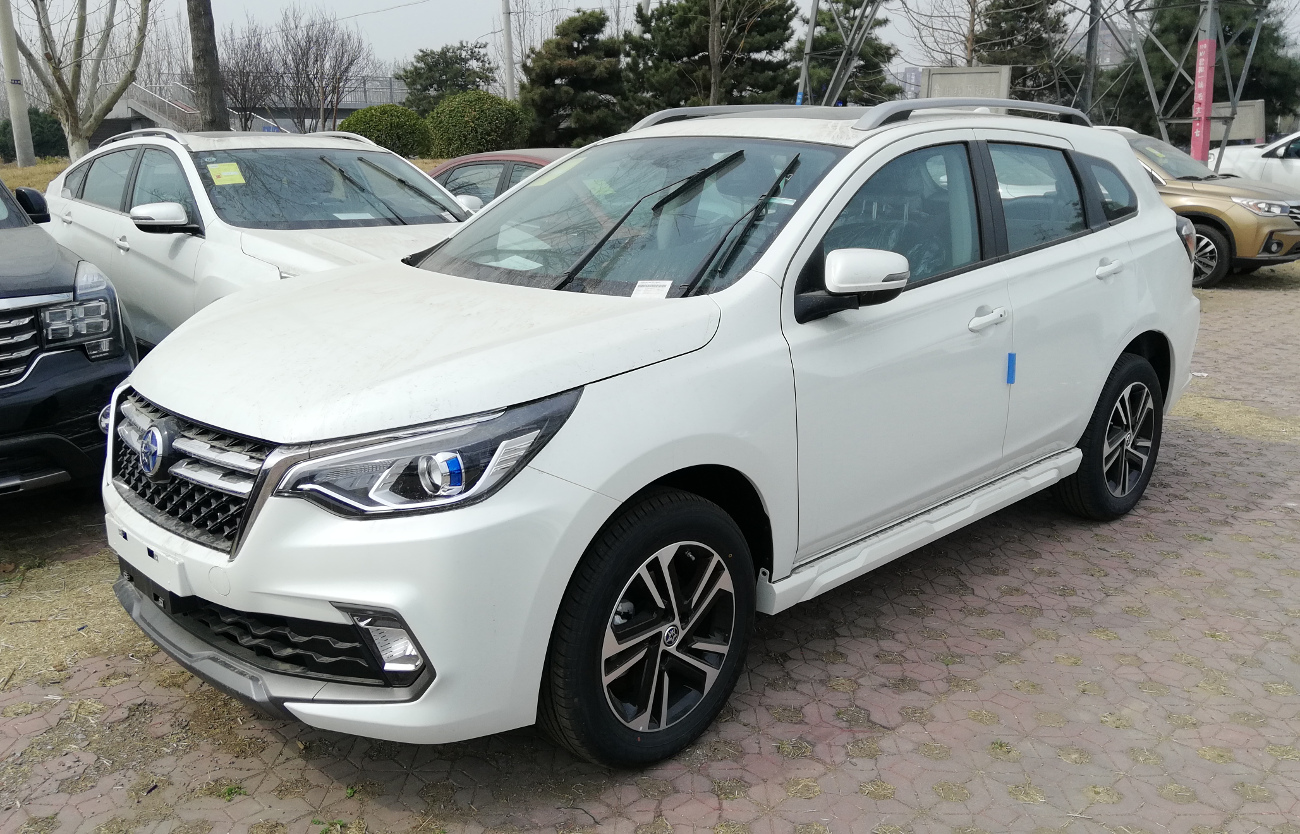
Venucia T70

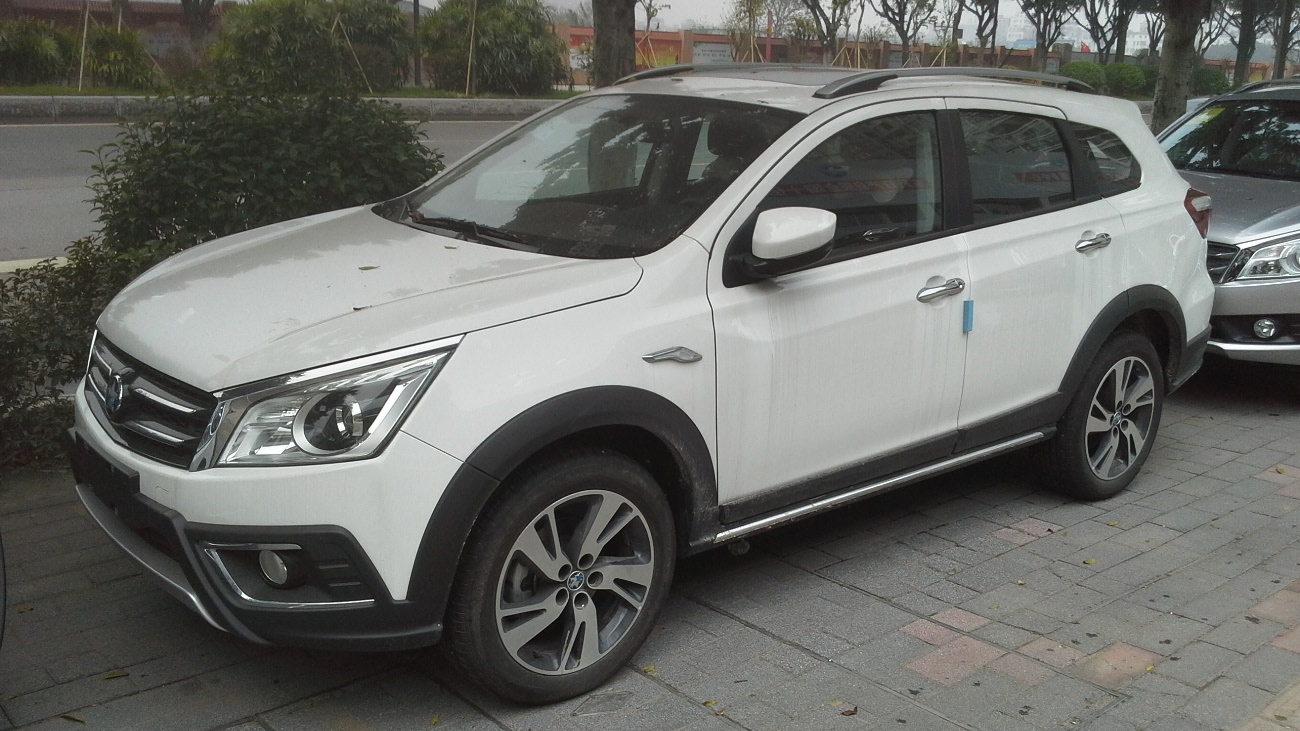
Venucia T70X

=== Renault Samsung ===
- 2008 Renault Samsung QM5
- 2009 Renault Samsung New SM3
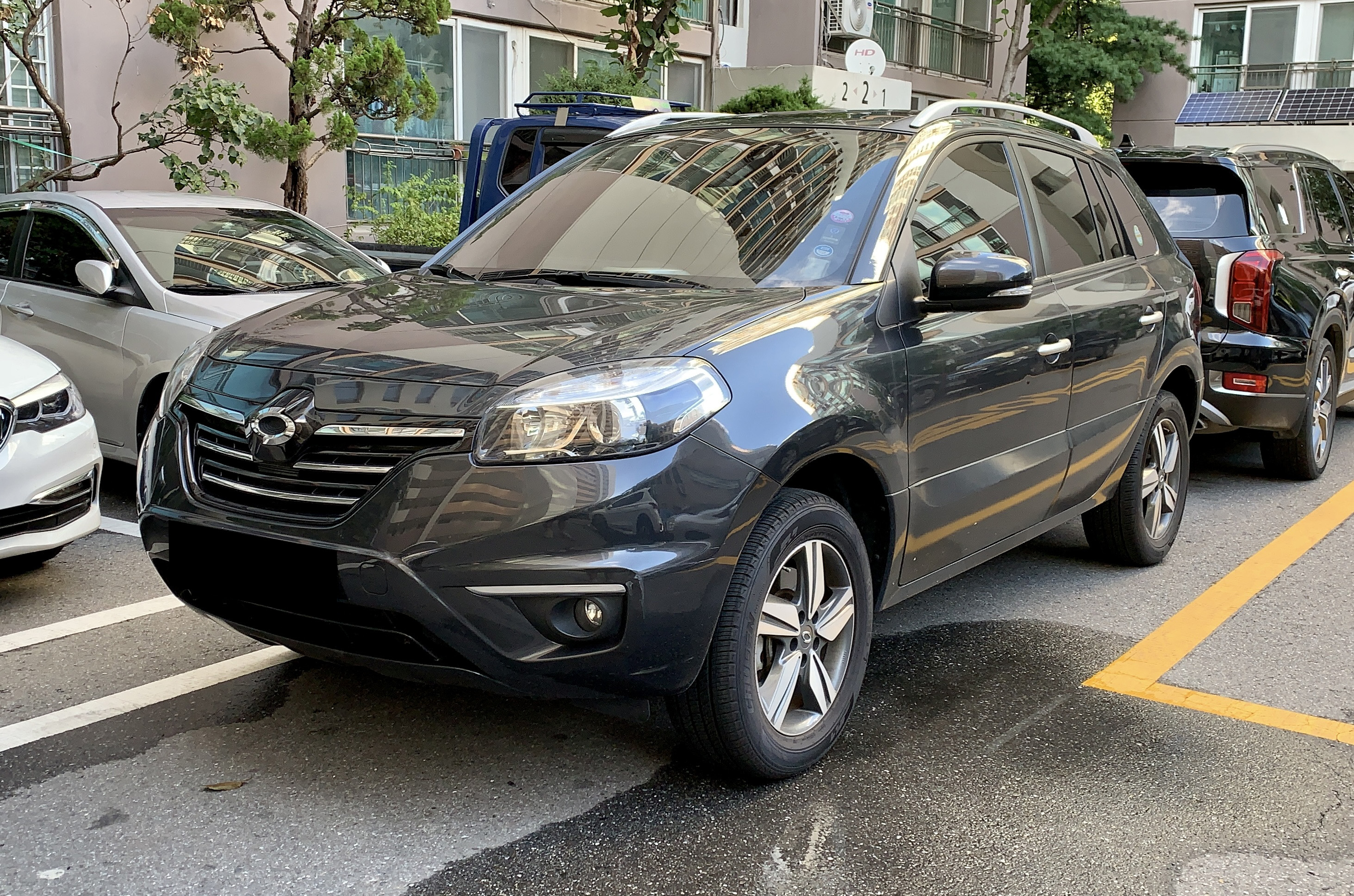
Renault Samsung QM5

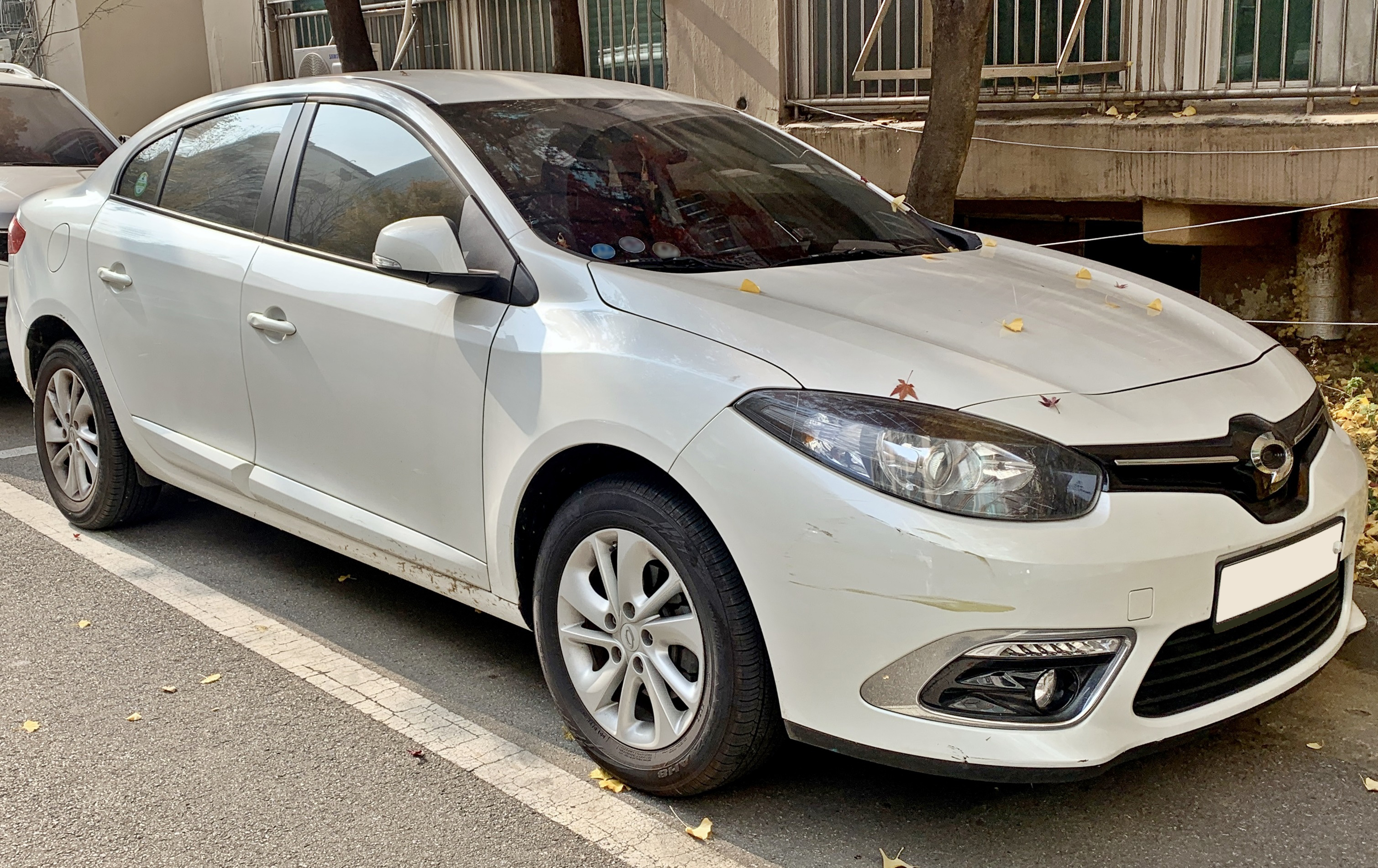
Renault Samsung New SM3
