= Venucia T70 =

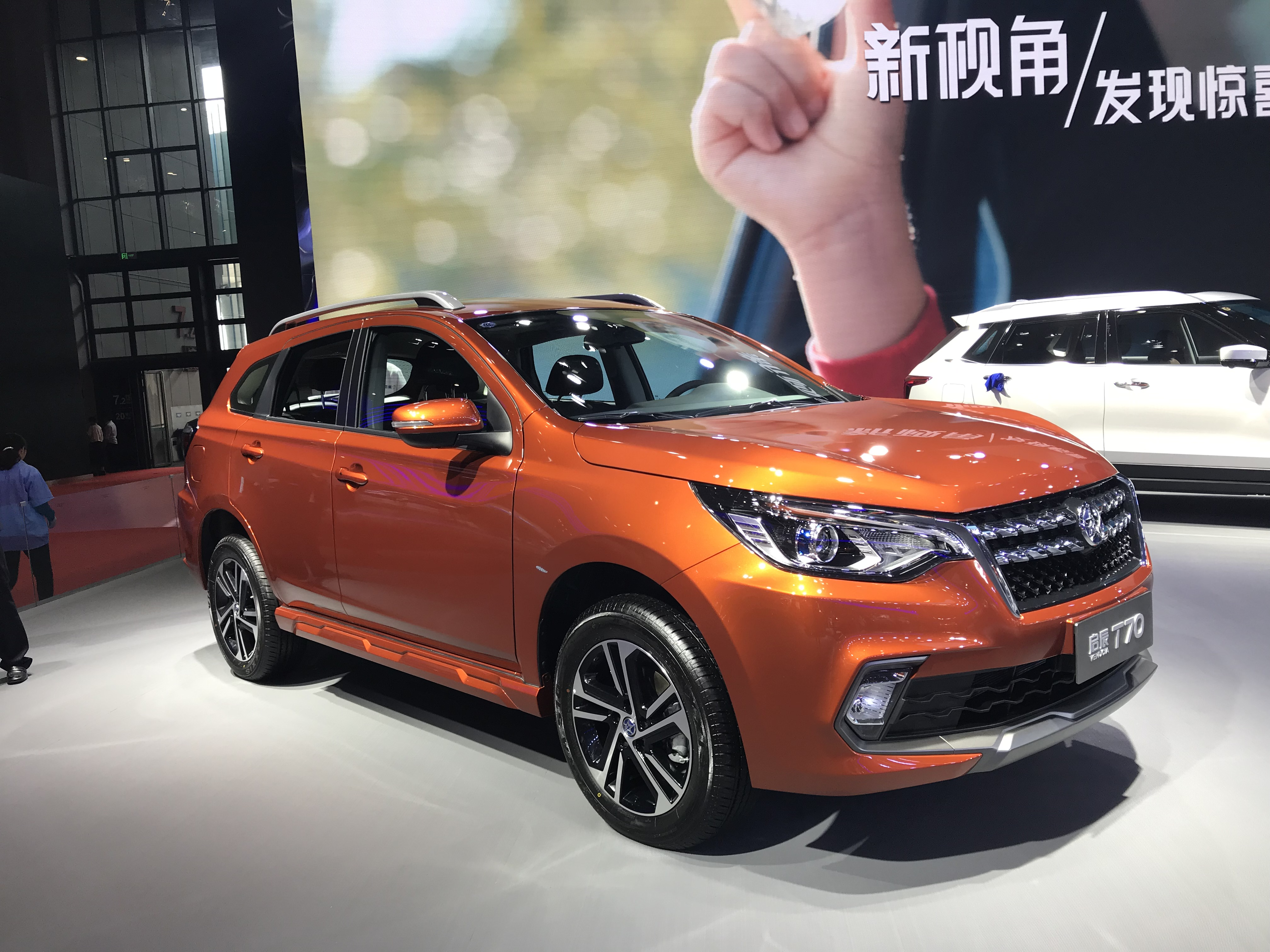

Overview
- Manufacturer: Venucia (Dongfeng Nissan)
- Also called: Venucia T70X
- Production: 2014–2020
- Assembly: Wuhan, China

Body and chassis
- Class: Compact crossover SUV
- Body style: 5-door station wagon
- Layout: Front-engine, front-wheel-drive four-wheel-drive (T70X)
- Platform: Renault–Nissan C platform
- Related: Nissan Qashqai

Powertrain
- Engine: Gasoline: 1.6 L HR16DE I4; 1.8 L MR18DE I4
- Transmission: 5-speed manual 5-speed automatic CVT automatic

Dimensions
- Wheelbase: 2,630 mm (103.5 in)
- Length: 4,542 mm (178.8 in)
- Width: 1,786 mm (70.3 in)
- Height: 1,642 mm (64.6 in)

The Venucia T70 is a compact crossover SUV produced by the Chinese car manufacturer Venucia since 2014. It debuted on the 2014 Guangzhou Auto Show in November 2014 and was launched on the Chinese auto market in December 2014. As of 2019, over 130,000 units have been sold.

== Overview ==
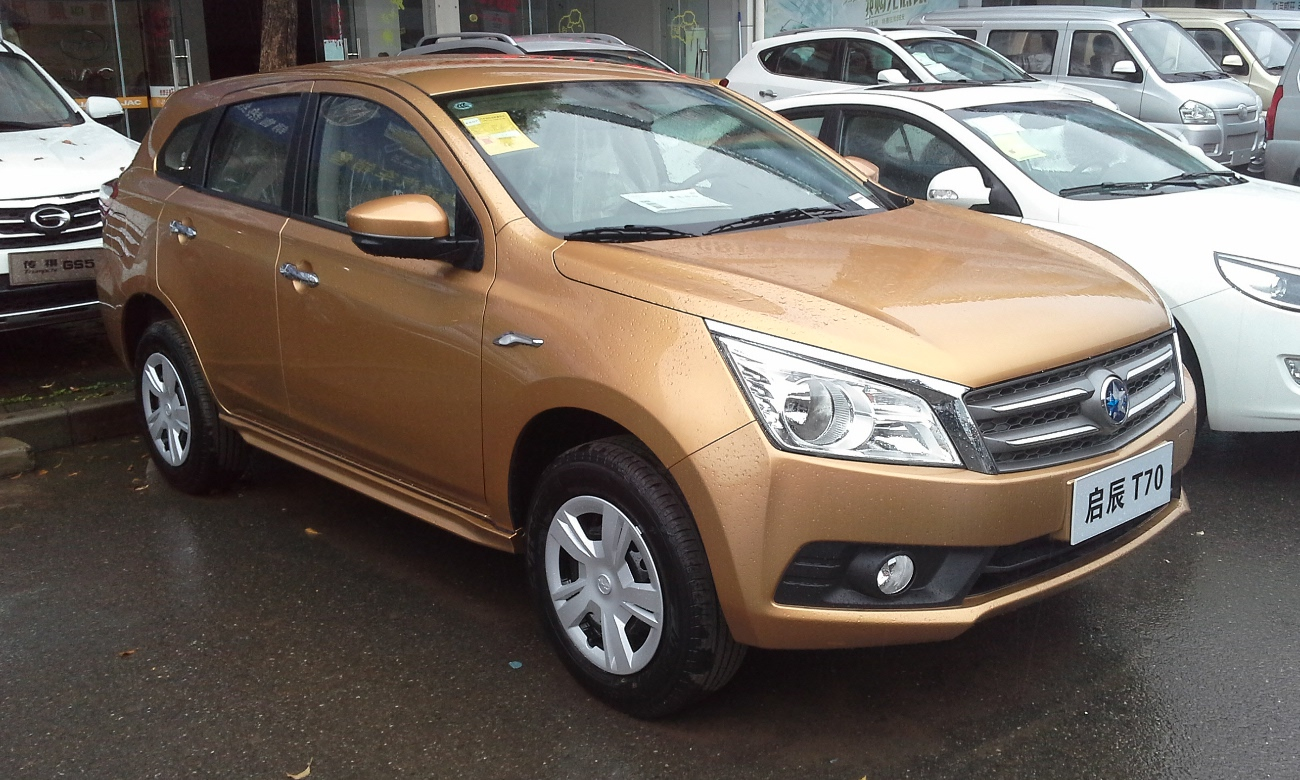

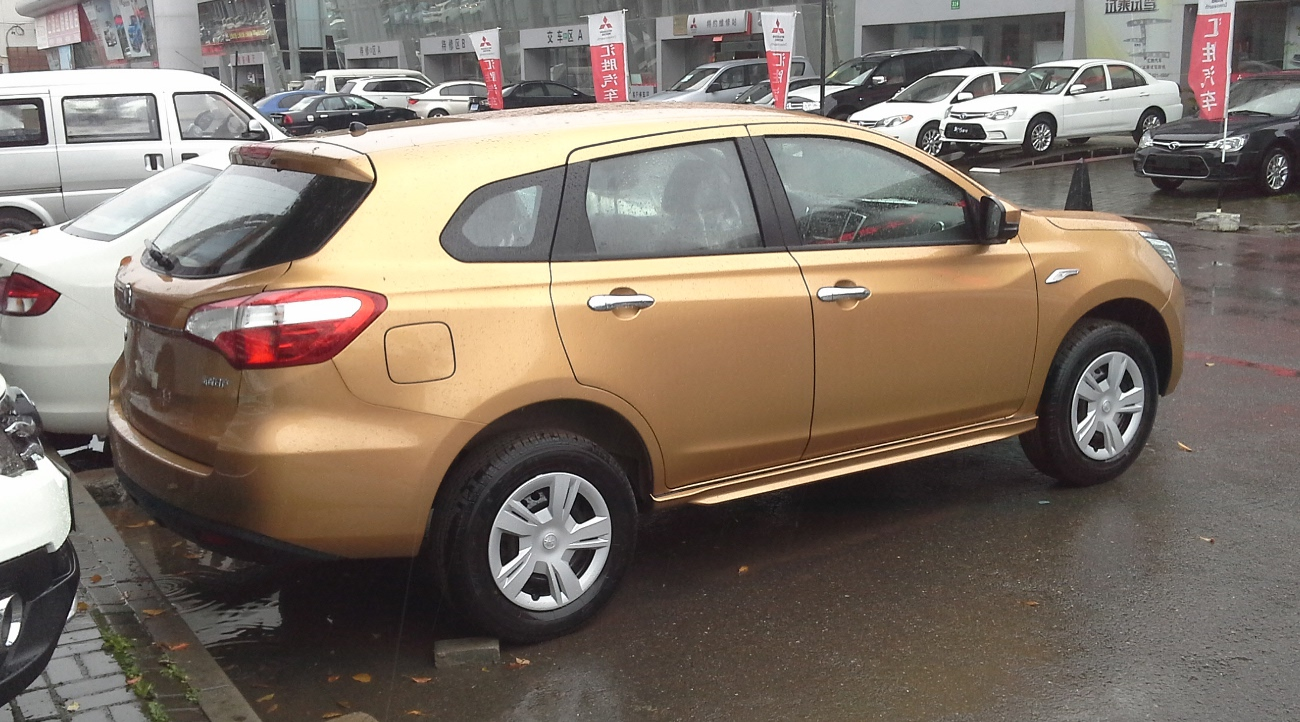
Venucia T70

The Venucia T70 is based on the Nissan C-platform also underpinning the first generation Nissan Qashqai that remained in production until 2014. Pricing for the Venucia T70 SUV ranges from 89,800 yuan to 127,800 yuan ($14,480-20,610).

== Venucia T70X ==
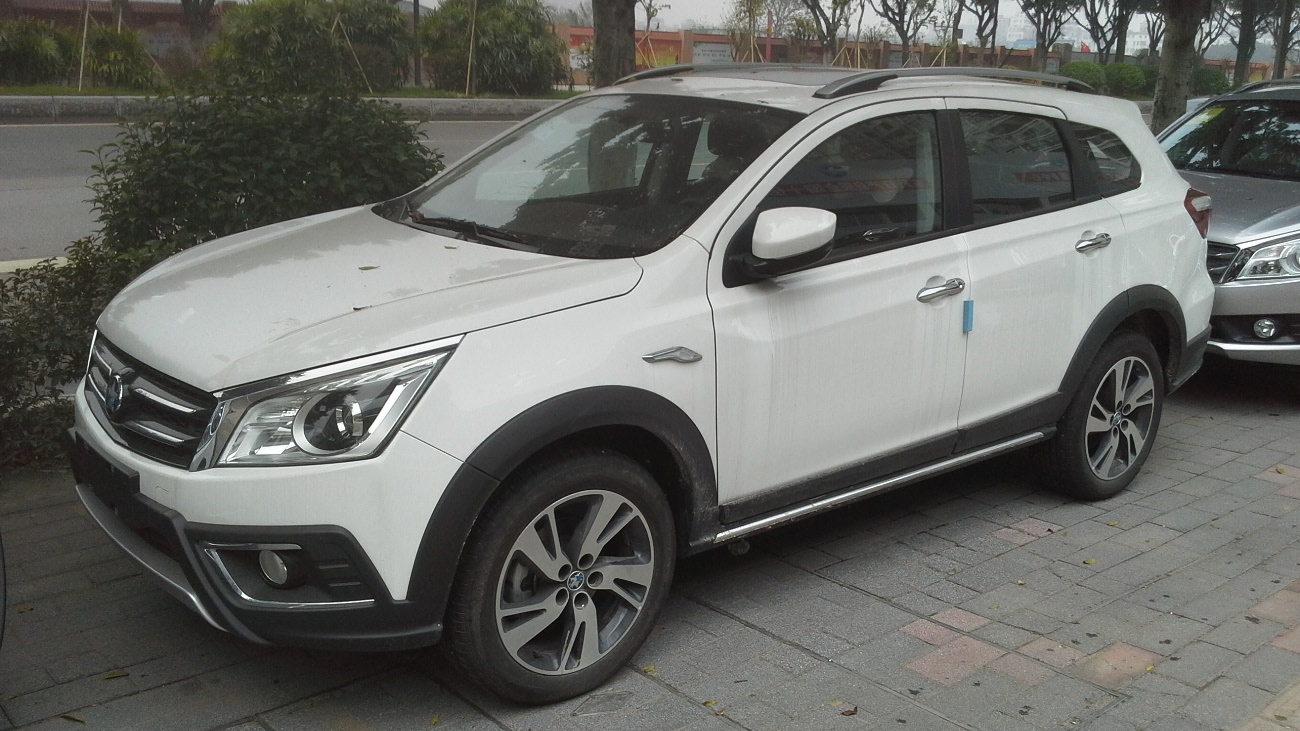
Venucia T70X

A more rugged AWD version with plastic claddings around the wheel arches and restyled bumpers called the Venucia T70X was available briefly between 2015 and 2017.

== 2018 facelift ==
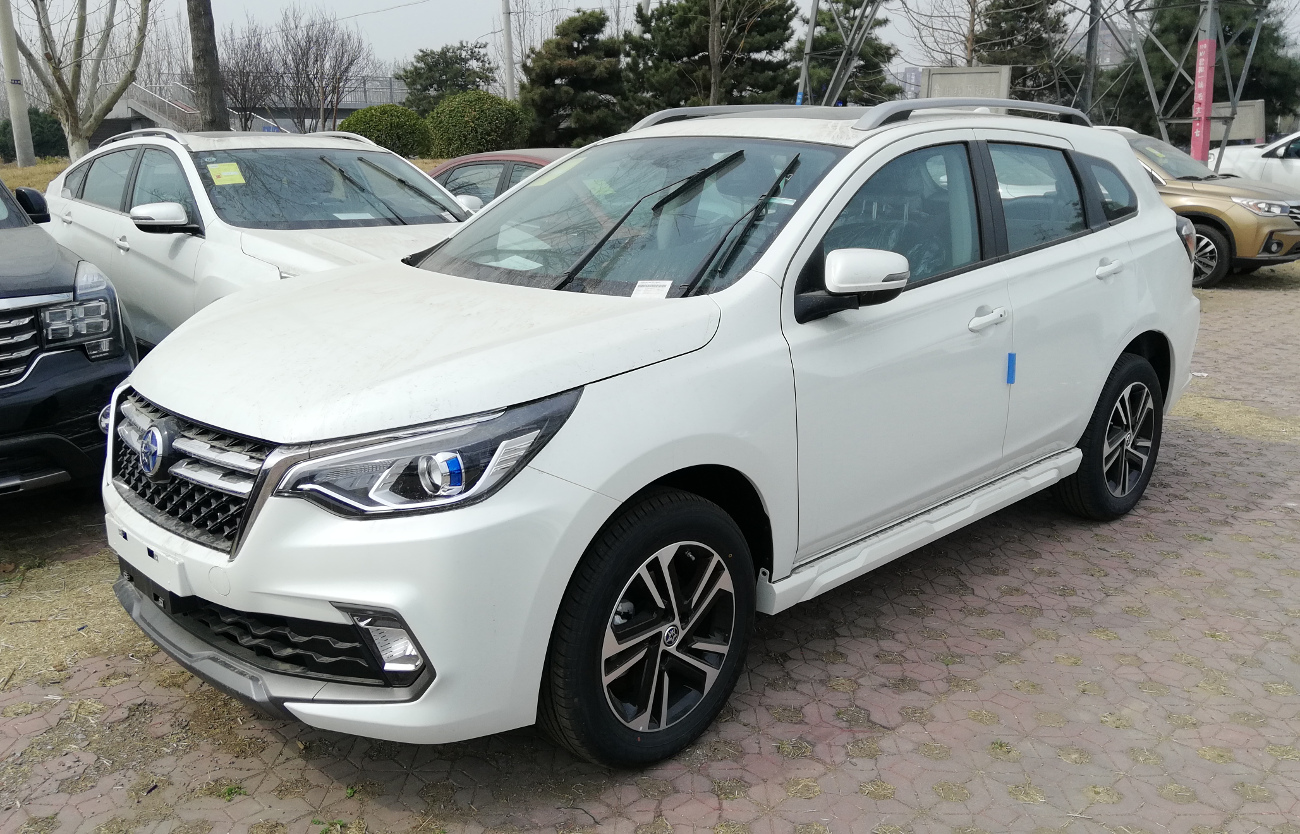
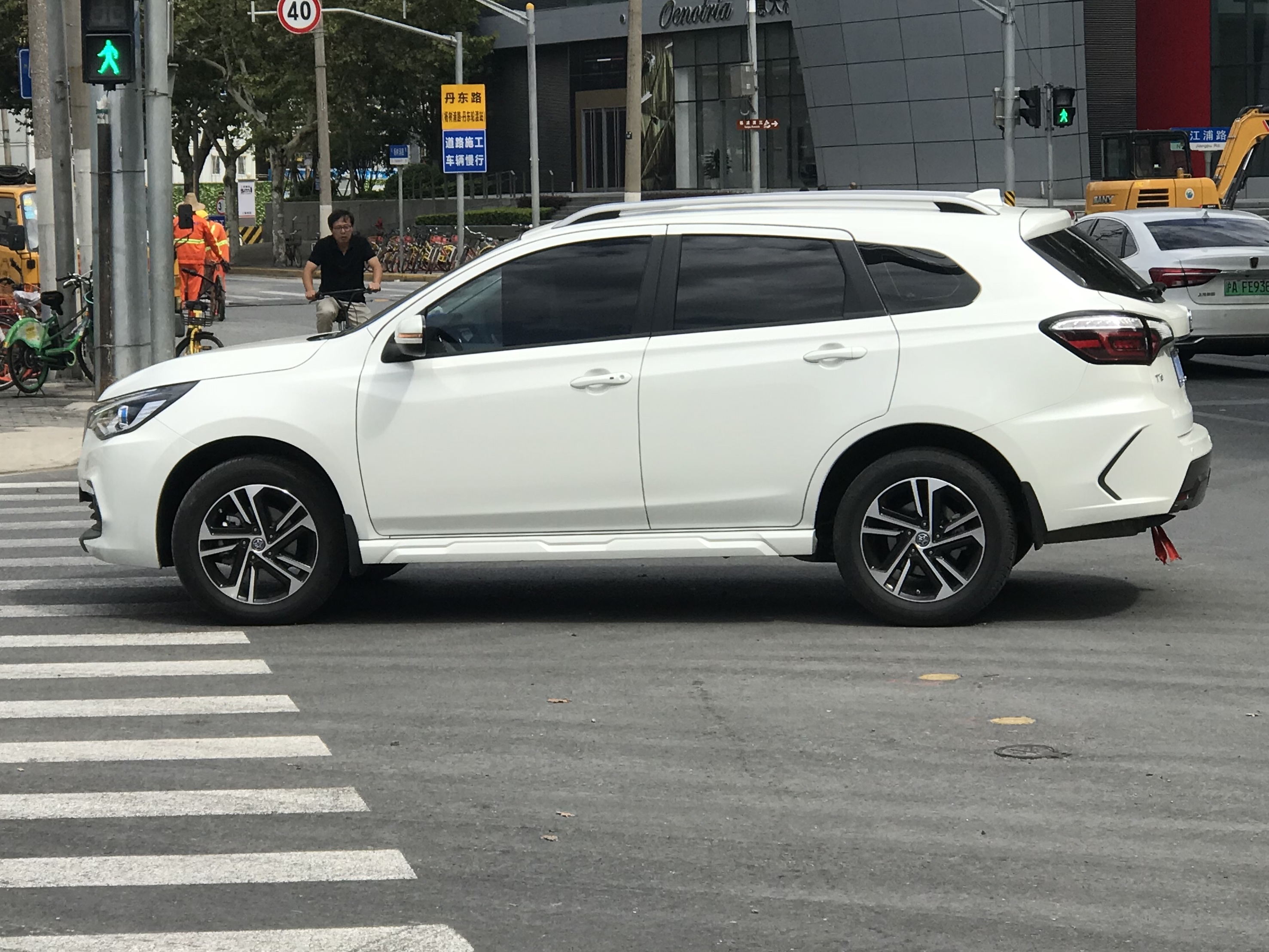

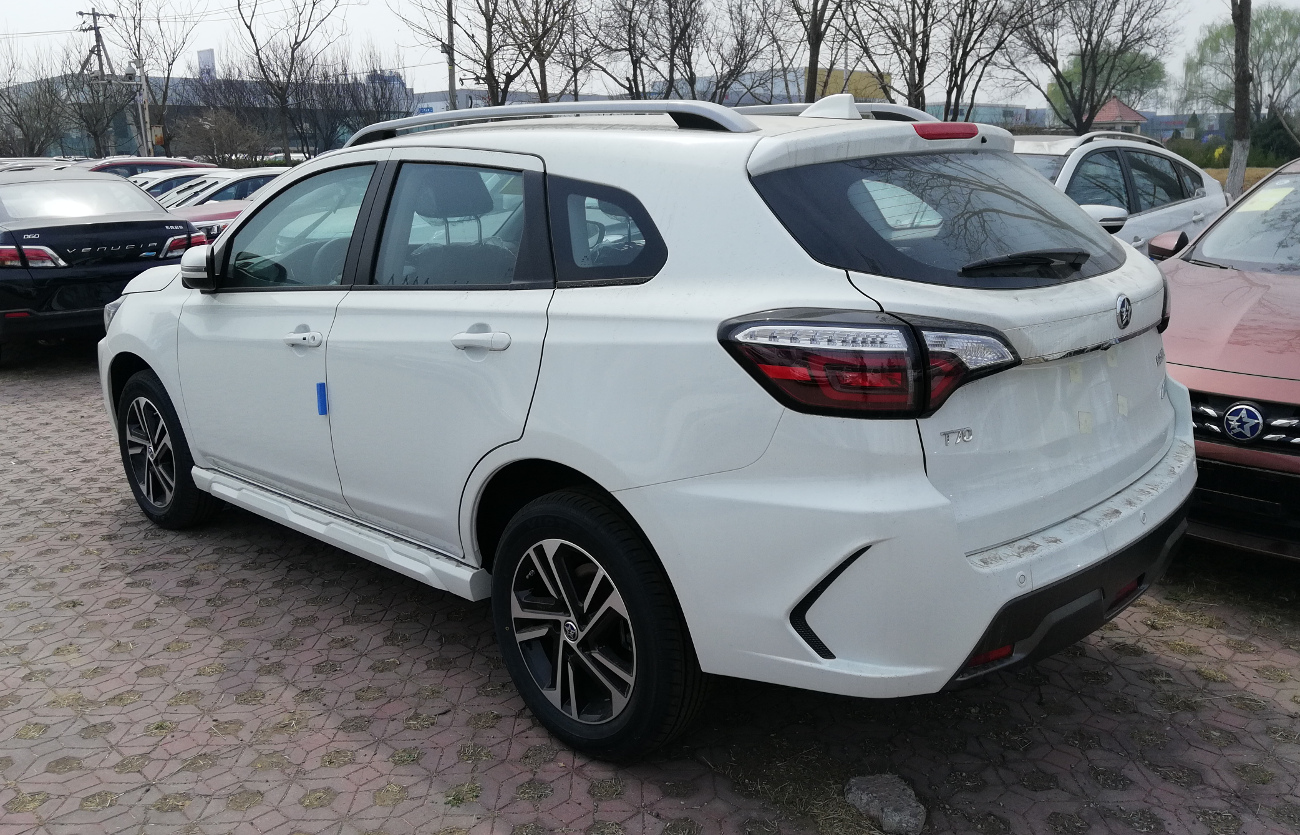
Venucia T70 facelift

The Venucia T70 facelift debuted during the 2017 Guangzhou Auto Show, and in December 2017, Venucia launched the facelift version of the Venucia T70 for the 2018 model year. The updated Venucia T70 features a redesigned front fascia and rear end.
