= Yema T70 =

Chinese compact crossover SUV

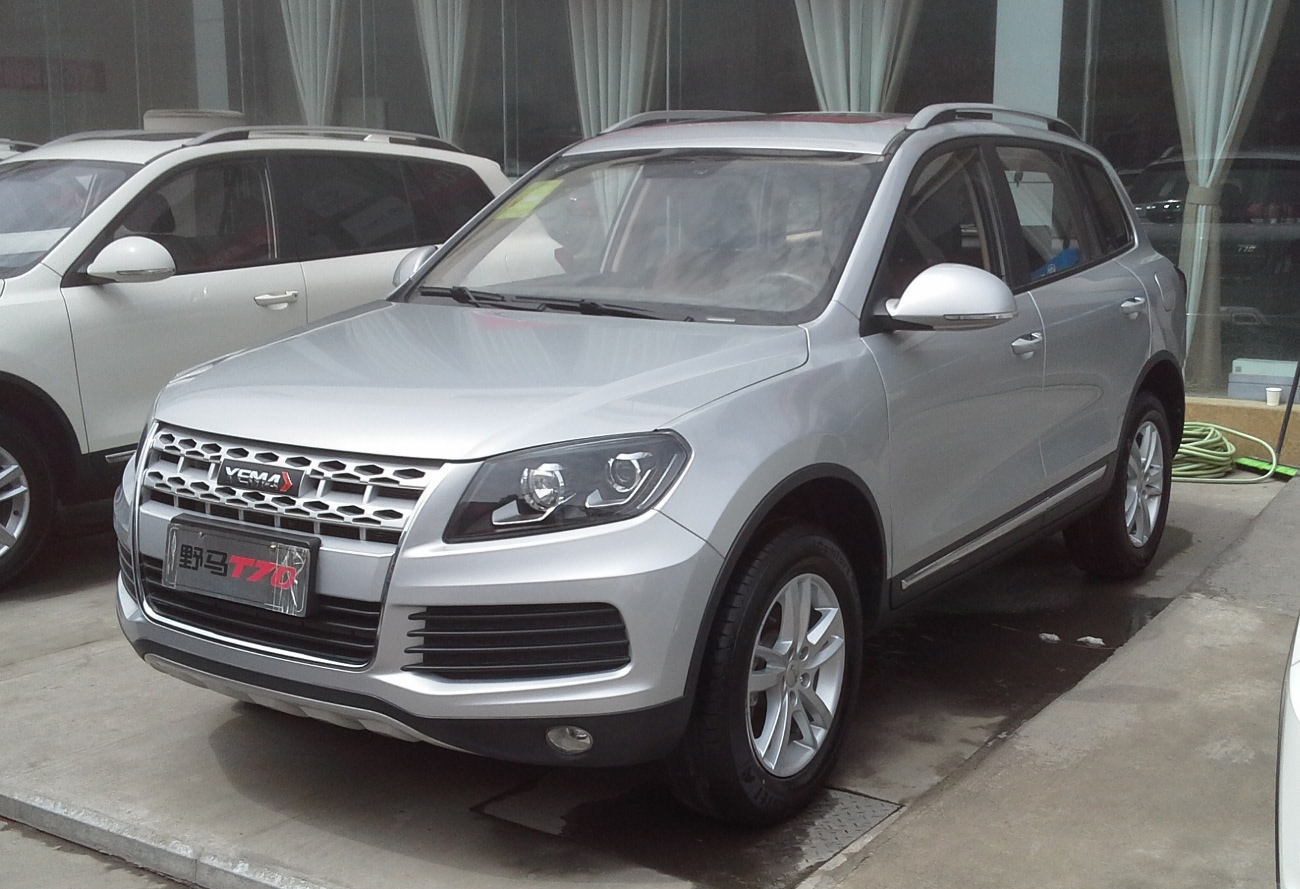

Overview
- Production: 2015–2019

Body and chassis
- Related: Yema T80

Powertrain
- Engine: 1.5L turbo inline 4; 1.8L inline 4; 1.8L turbo inline 4
- Transmission: 6-speed manual 6-speed automatic

Dimensions
- Wheelbase: 2,665 mm (104.9 in)
- Length: 4,555 mm (179.3 in)
- Width: 1,835 mm (72.2 in)
- Height: 1,715 mm (67.5 in)

The Yema T70 is a compact crossover SUV produced by Chinese automaker Yema Auto from 2015 to 2019. The Yema T70 debuted during the 2014 Chengdu Auto Show in China, and was launched in China in March 2015.

== Overview ==
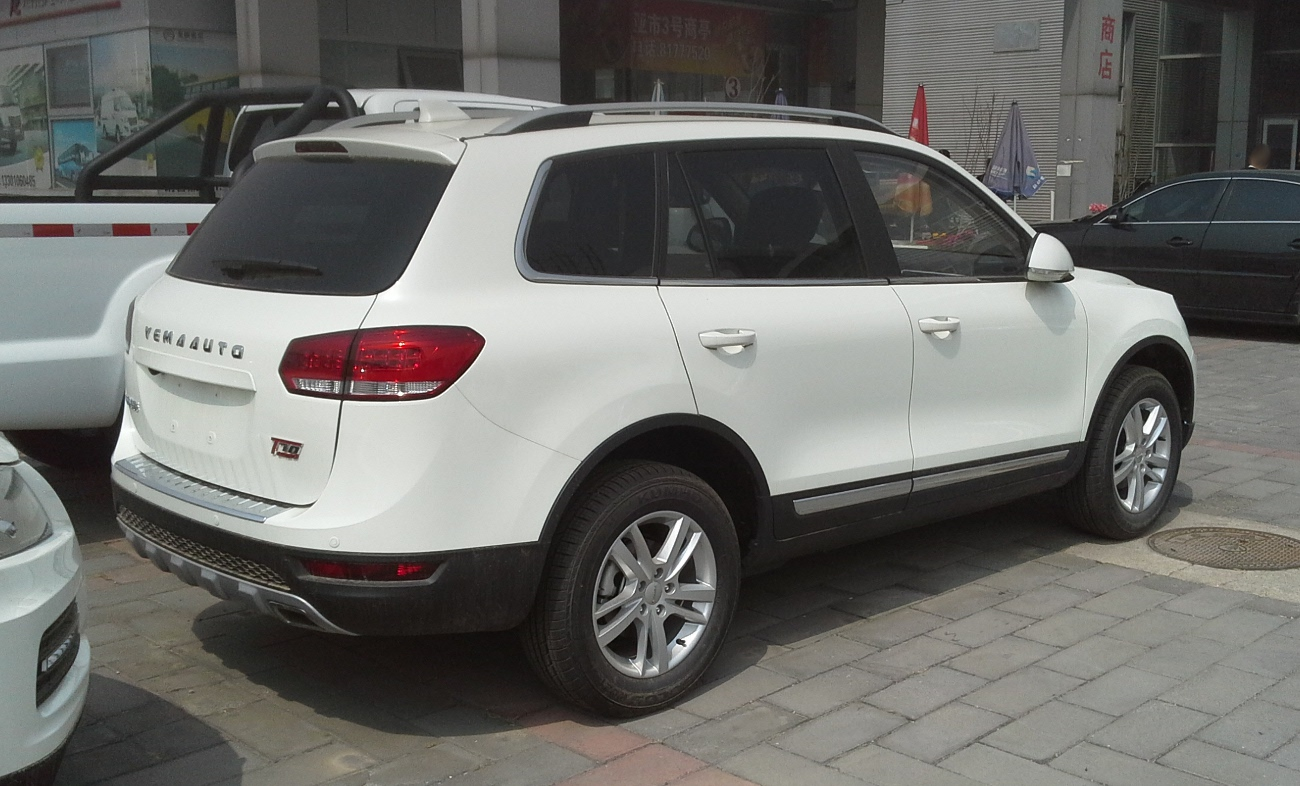
Yema T70 rear

Positioning above the compact Yema F series (Yema F10, Yema F12, Yema F16) compact crossover products, the design is said to be inspired by the first generation Volkswagen Touareg midsize crossover and the first generation Volkswagen Tiguan compact crossover, with the front and rear DRG heavily resembling the Volkswagen crossovers.

A pickup version of the T70 was also rumored to be in development with the front end design similar to the Yema T70.

A sportier Yema T70S was also available starting from the 2017 model year featuring the 1.5 liter turbo engine but with no obvious styling changes.

Prices for the Yema T70 ranges from 69,800 yuan to 115,800 yuan, while the electric version, the Yema EC70 has prices ranging from 218,800 yuan to 249,800 yuan.

== Engines ==
The Yema T70 is the first all-new Yema passenger vehicle since 2008, built on a brand new platform with brand new engine options. The Yema T70 is available with two four-cylinder petrol engine options including a 131hp 1.8 liter engine mated to a five-speed manual gearbox, and a 170hp 1.8 liter turbo engine mated to a CVT, with a 6-speed automatic gearbox added to the line-up at a later time.

== Yema EC70 ==
An electric version of the T70 called the EC70 was available to the market in April 2015. Originally called the E70 EV, the official range for the EC70 is 400 kilometers with a top speed of 140 kilometer per hour, and charging on a fast charger will take two hours for a full battery.
