= 2023 Moscow Victory Day Parade =

Russian military parade

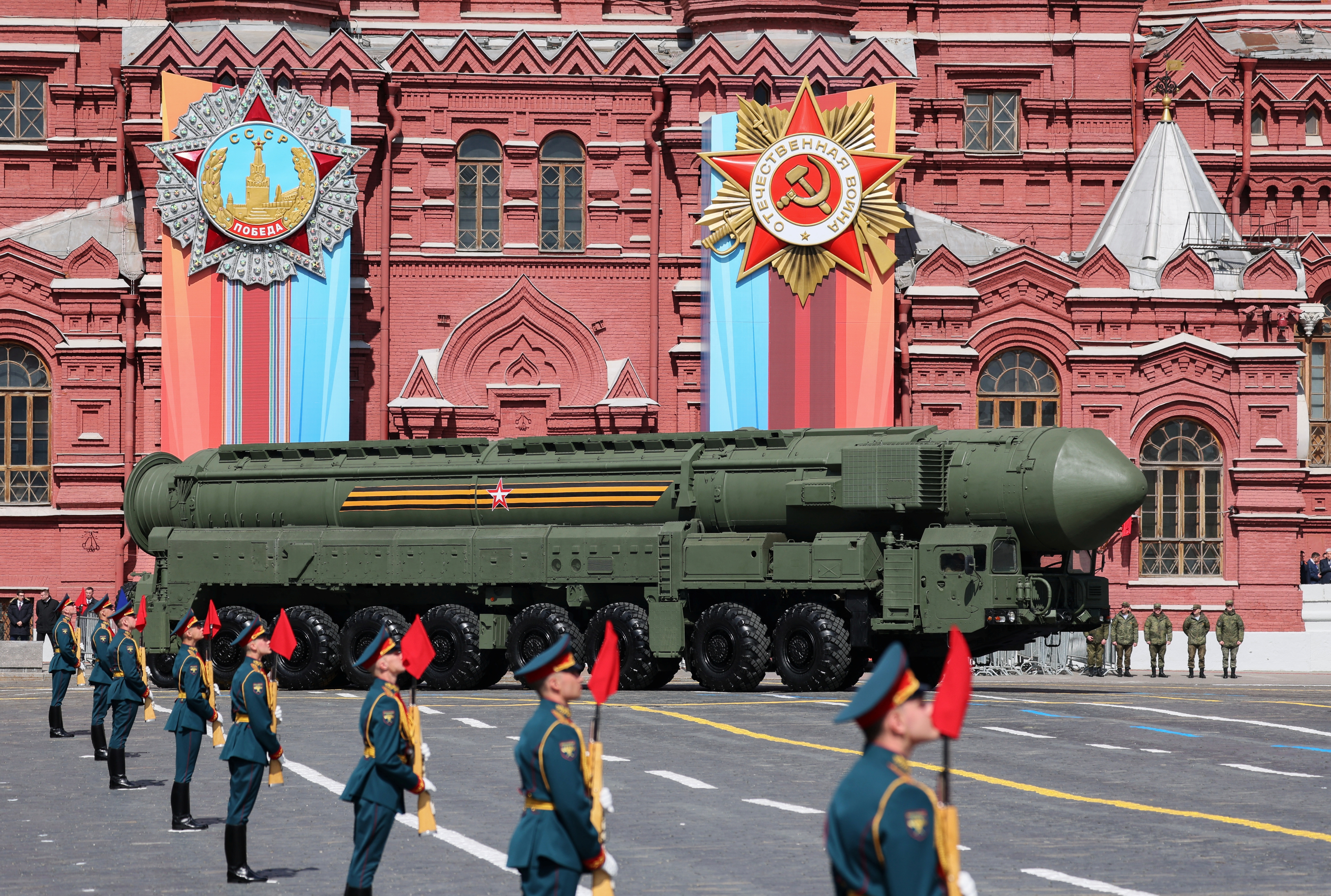
RS-24 Yars ICBM on show at the 2023 Moscow Victory Day Parade

The 2023 Moscow Victory Day Parade was a military parade held in Red Square, Moscow, Russia, on 9 May 2023, to commemorate Victory Day which celebrates the defeat of Nazi Germany and the end of the Eastern Front of World War II. The event was scaled down due to the ongoing Russian invasion of Ukraine amidst an arrest warrant for Vladimir Putin issued by the International Criminal Court in March 2023.

== Background ==
Victory Day is a significant secular holiday in Russia that commemorates Germany's surrender in World War II, which marked the end of one of the deadliest conflicts in human history. The holiday celebrates the military might and moral fortitude of the Red Army, which suffered enormous losses in the war, with at least 20 million Soviet citizens losing their lives. Victory Day has been observed annually on May 9 since 1945, and it is one of the most revered and widely celebrated public holidays in Russia, with parades, fireworks, and concerts held across the country.

== Parade summary ==
The 2023 parade was heavily scaled down compared to earlier parades. Around 51 vehicles were present, which included IMVs and Remdiesel Z-STS Akhmat MRAPs, the latter of which are only used by Chechen forces.

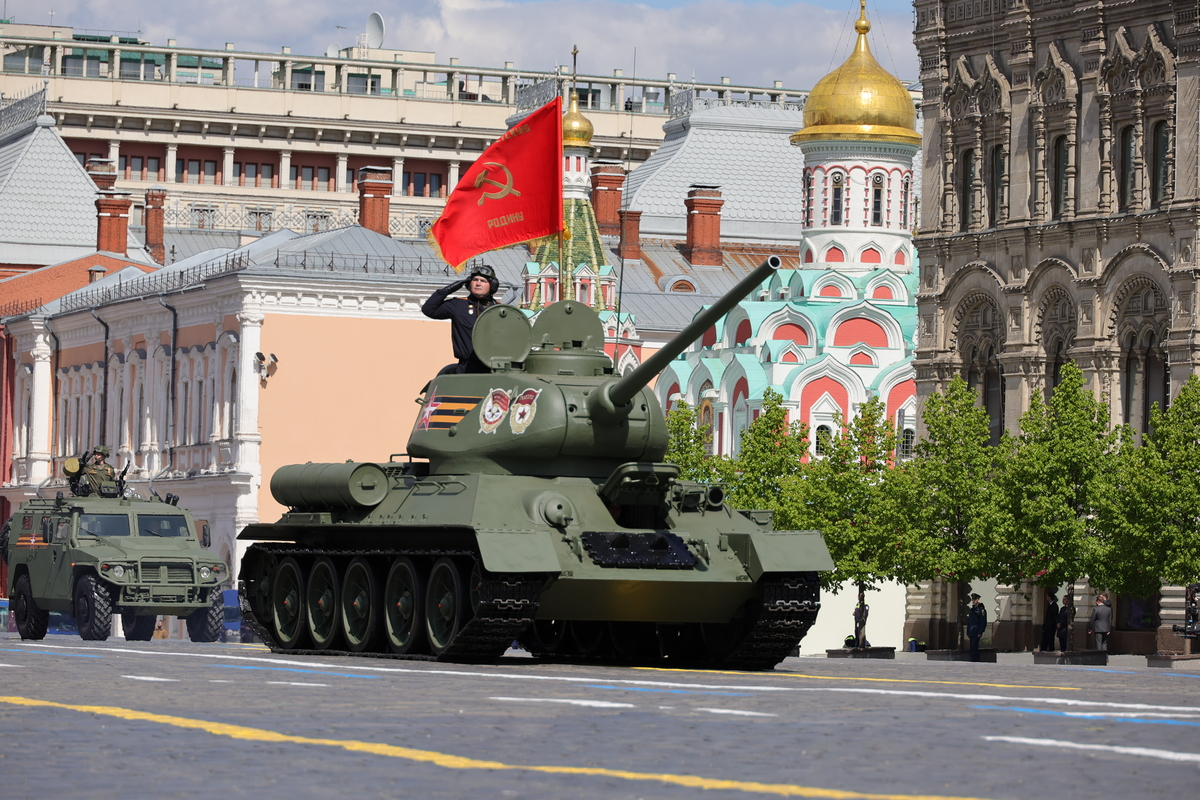
T-34-85, the sole tank on show at the 2023 Moscow Victory Day Parade

Only one tank was shown, namely an antique T-34-85, a type produced in the Soviet Union from 1944 to 1946. No flyover column was present during the event for the second year in a row. Only 51 vehicles were present compared to 197 for the 2021 Victory Day parade, roughly only 25% of the vehicles that appeared in 2021. Given the lack of a flyover, the parade lasted only 45 minutes, compared to an hour and a half as per usual. Only eight thousand soldiers took place in the parade compared to eleven thousand soldiers who appeared in 2021. The vintage T-34-85 was the only tracked vehicle on parade, the rest of the vehicles were light fighting vehicles that were wheeled. Vehicles such as VPK-3927 Volk, Tigr and VPK-7829 Bumerang appeared on the parade. No short range air defense systems were seen either, a break from previous parades. Finally the relatives of those that fought in Great Patriotic War, the Immortal Regiment, were not allowed to march.

As in earlier years, missile launchers and artillery were also included. ICBMs were shown and among these were three RS-24 Yars.

== Putin's speech ==
In his speech to the Russian audience, Putin claimed that Russia is the defender of peace, freedom, and stability, saying that "We believe that any ideology of superiority is inherently disgusting, criminal and deadly." Putin accused "Western globalist elites" for "provoking bloody conflicts and upheaval," professing an "aggressive nationalism," sowing hatred and Russophobia, and destroying traditional family values.

== Foreign dignitaries in attendance ==
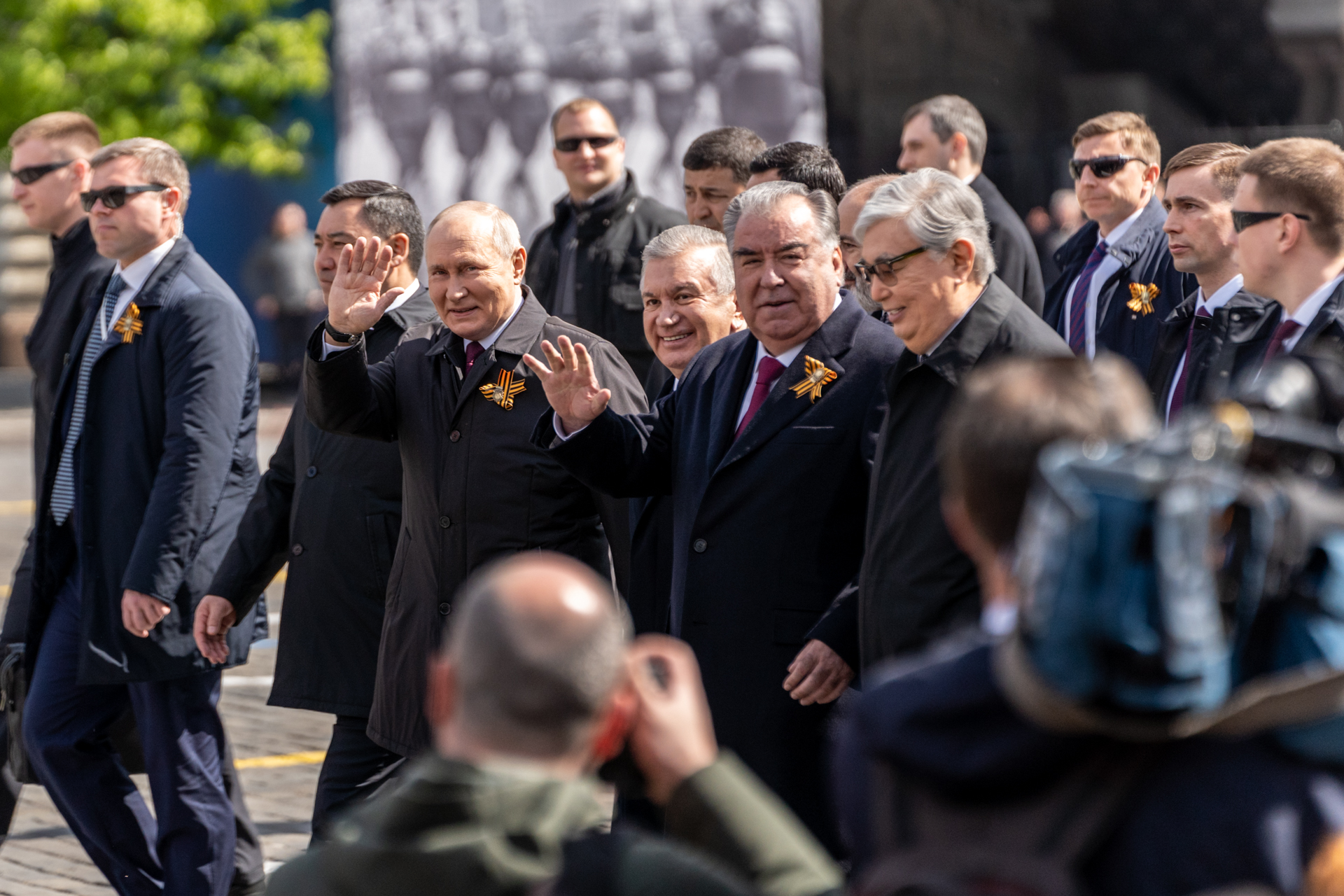
Vladimir Putin and other post-Soviet leaders at the 2023 Moscow Victory Day Parade

Amongst those in attendance were:

- President of Belarus Alexander Lukashenko
- President of Kazakhstan Kassym-Jomart Tokayev
- President of Kyrgyzstan Sadyr Japarov
- President of Tajikistan Emomali Rahmon
- President of Turkmenistan Serdar Berdimuhamedow
- President of Uzbekistan Shavkat Mirziyoyev
- Prime Minister of Armenia Nikol Pashinyan

== See also ==
- 1945 Moscow Victory Parade
- Victory Day (9 May)
- Victory in Europe Day
- Victory Day Parades
- 2023 Kremlin drone explosion
