= Remdiesel =

Remdiesel (Ремдизель; Remdizel) may refer to:

- Remdiesel (Russia), Russian automobile plant
- Remdiesel (Ukraine), former Ukrainian automobile repair plant
