= Sehol X4 =

Compact crossover produced by JAC Motors

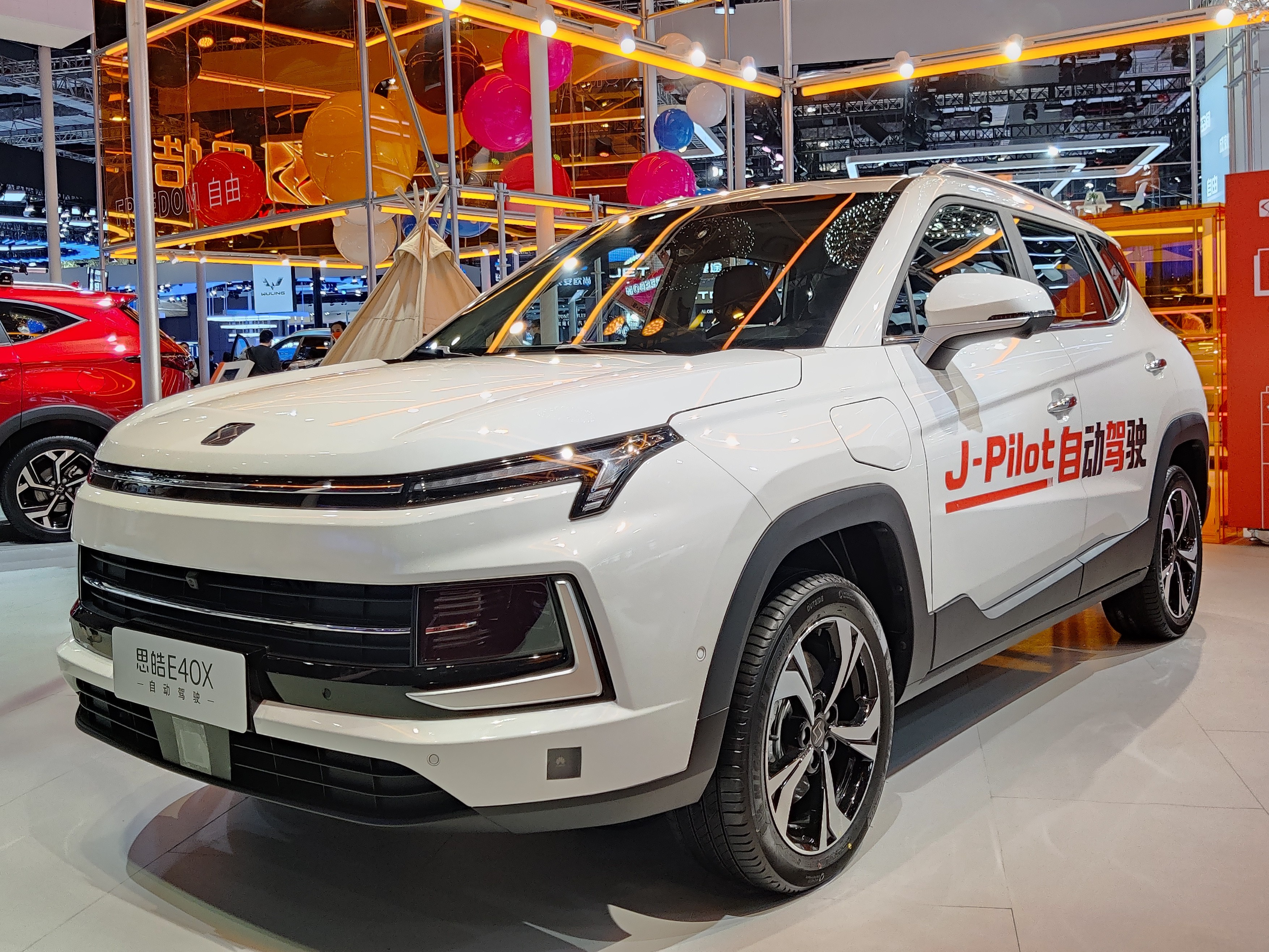
- Sehol E40X

Overview
- Manufacturer: JAC Motors
- Also called: JAC JS4 (Middle East, Egypt and Lebanon); JAC T60 Plus (Brazil); Sehol E40X (China); JAC Refine S4; Moskvitch 3 / 3e (Russia); GTV Kessor (Cambodia); JAC e-JS4 (Norway)
- Production: 2020–present
- Assembly: China: Hefei; Russia: Moscow (Moskvitch)

Body and chassis
- Class: Compact crossover SUV (C)
- Body style: 5-door SUV
- Platform: Jianghuai SS
- Related: JAC Refine S4

Powertrain
- Engine: Petrol: 1.5 L turbo I4; 1.6 L I4
- Electric motor: Permanent magnet synchronous motor (EV)
- Power output: 88 kW (120 hp; 122 PS) (1.6 L); 110 kW (148 hp; 150 PS) (EV and 1.5 L turbo)
- Transmission: 6-speed manual CVT; 1-speed direct-drive (EV)
- Battery: Li-ion battery (EV only): 55 kWh; 66 kWh

Dimensions
- Wheelbase: 2,620 mm (103.1 in)
- Length: 4,410 mm (173.6 in)
- Width: 1,800 mm (70.9 in)
- Height: 1,660 mm (65.4 in)
- Curb weight: 1,365–1,375 kg (3,009–3,031 lb)

The Sehol X4 or previously the JAC Jiayue X4 is a compact crossover produced by JAC Motors under the Sehol brand. The Sehol X4 was briefly called the Sol X4 and JAC Jiayue X4 before the Sehol brand name was established. The Sehol X4 is essentially an extensive facelift of the previously launched JAC Refine S4.

The X4 is also rebranded as the Moskvitch 3 in Russia.

Sehol X4s are manufactured in Hefei and also assembled from knock-down kits at the Moscow Automobile Plant Moskvitch, in partnership with Kamaz.

== Overview ==
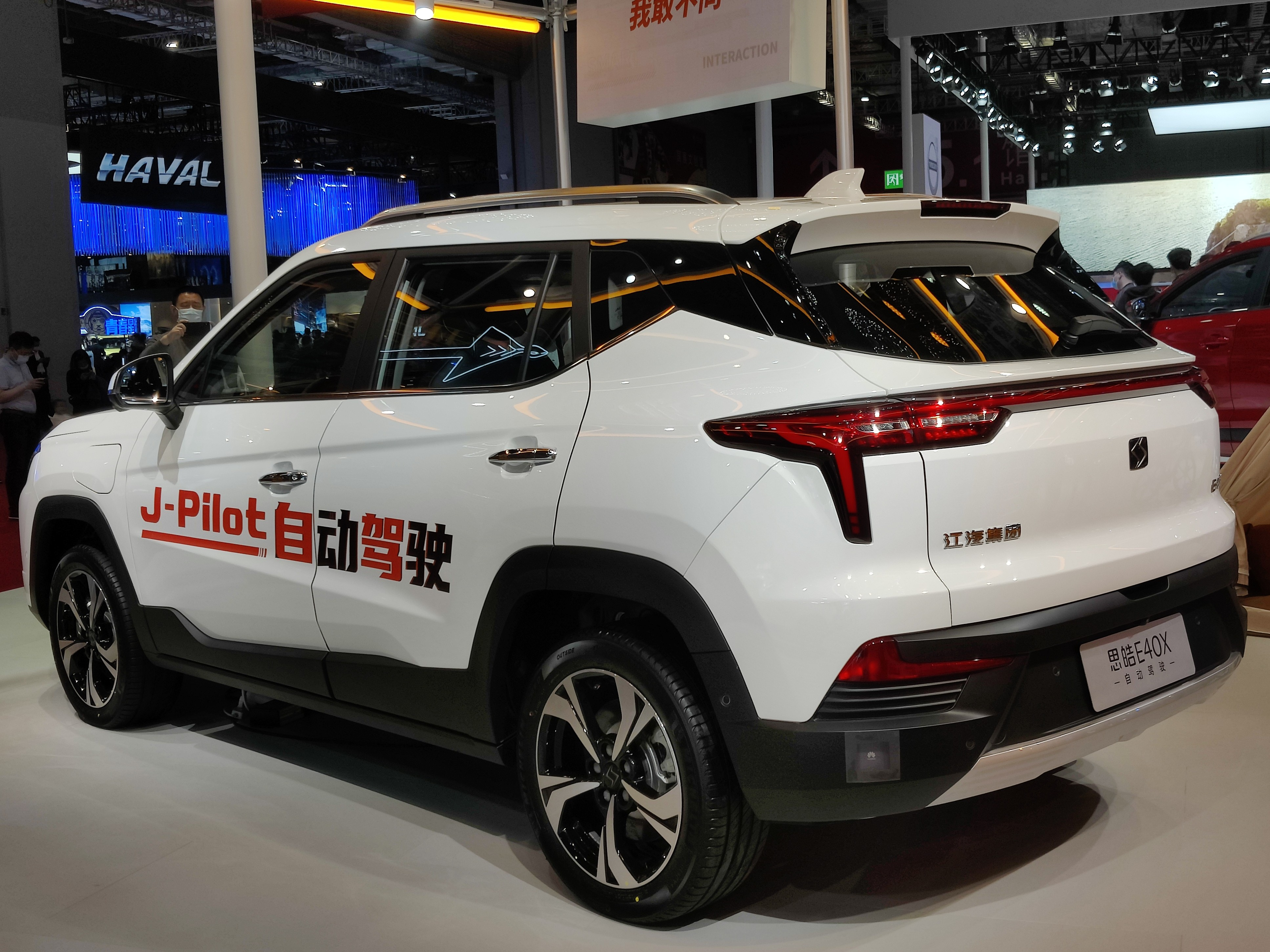
Sehol E40X (electric version of the Sehol X4) rear

The X4 was launched on the Mainland Chinese market in June 2020 as a modernized variant of the JAC Refine S4 and remains available there. In Brazil, however, in December 2020 the vehicle replaced the S4, which was marketed there as the T60. The X4 is sold there as the JAC T60 Plus. The battery-powered Sol E40X from the Sol brand was presented at the Chengdu Auto Show in July 2020. The Sol brand was later renamed to Sehol. It has been on sale in China since January 2021.

=== Powertrain ===
The X4 is powered by the 1.5-liter petrol engine familiar from the S4. The vehicle is only offered with front-wheel drive. The X4 has a 6-speed manual transmission as standard, a continuously variable transmission is available at an additional cost.

=== Sehol E40X (electric variant) ===
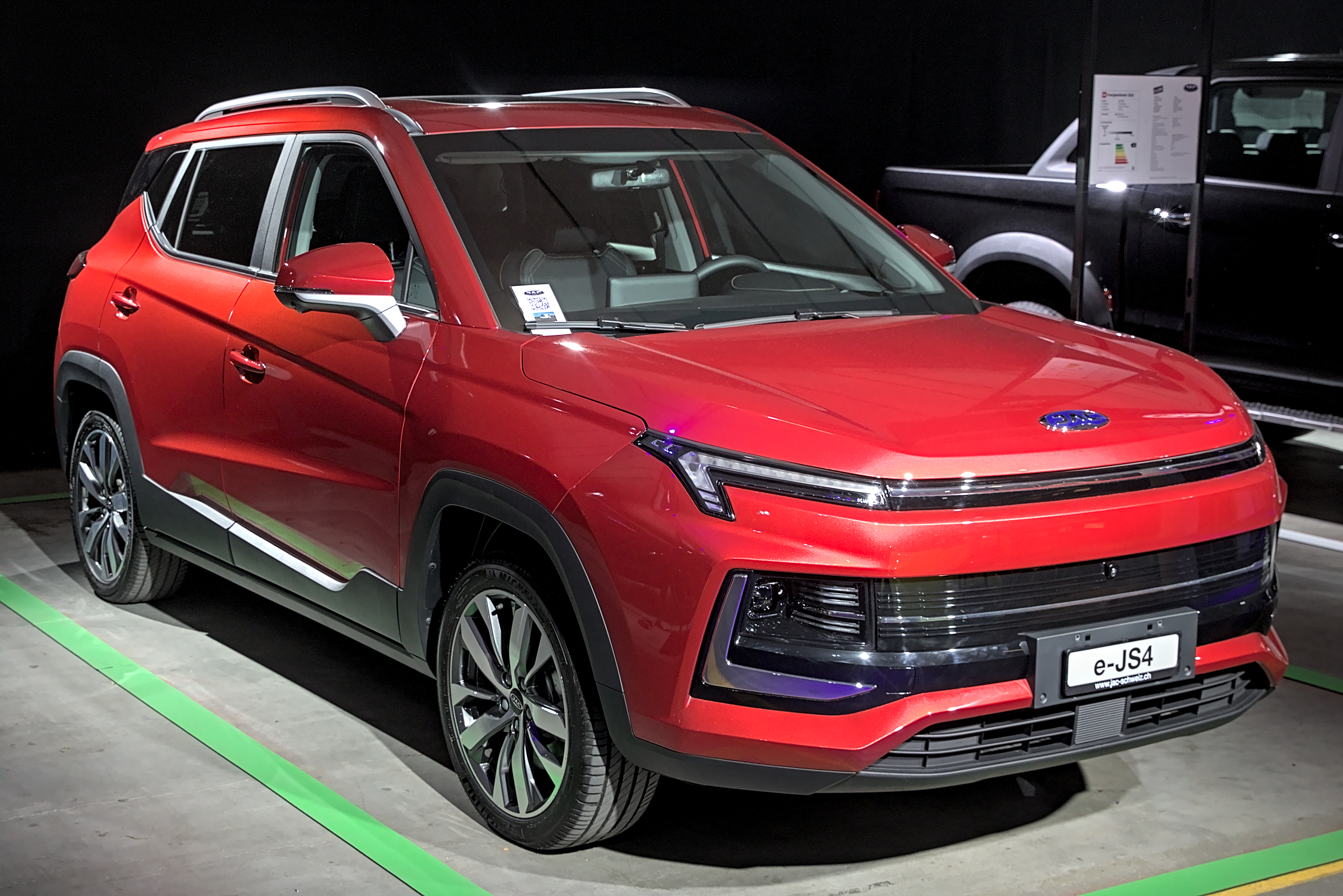
JAC e-JS4 (Sehol E40X)

The E40X has an accumulator with an energy content of 55 kWh or 66 kWh. According to the NEDC, the range is given as 420 km (261 mi) or 502 km (312 mi).

=== Moskvitch 3 ===
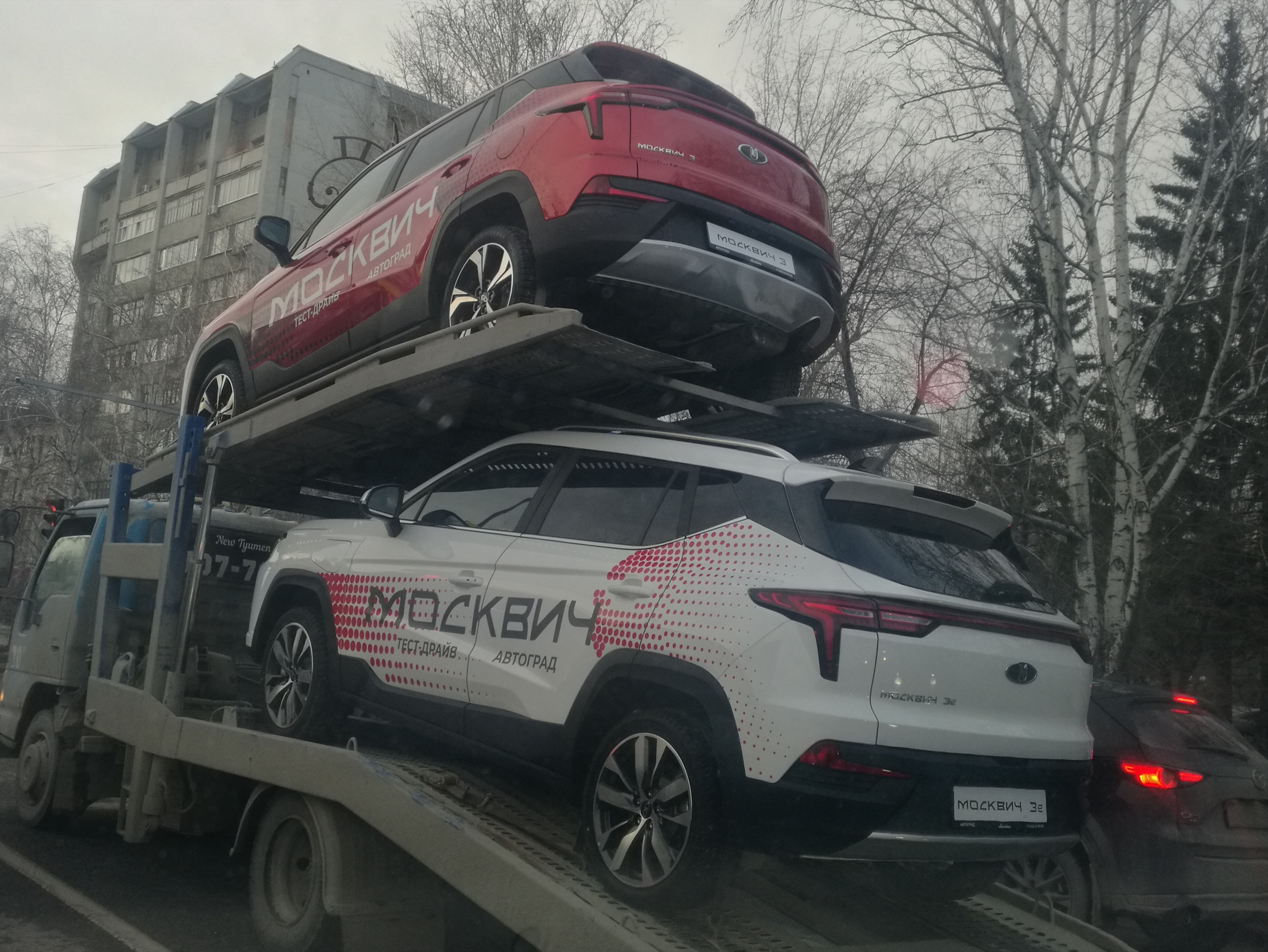
Two Moskvich 3 models transported on a truck

On November 23, 2022, the factory began SKD assembly of the Moskvitch 3, and on December 26, 2022, it went on sale in Russia alongside the electric version.

=== GTV Kessor ===
In August 2024, GTV Motor Cambodia introduced the GTV Kessor, a rebadged Sehol X4 compact SUV. The Cambodian‑market version is powered by a 1.5‑litre turbocharged inline‑four petrol engine producing 150 hp, paired with a six‑speed automatic transmission and front‑wheel drive. Standard equipment includes LED headlamps and taillights, a panoramic sunroof, electronic parking brake with auto‑hold, a 360‑degree camera system, and multiple advanced driver‑assistance features. Sharing its platform with the Sehol X4, the GTV Kessor measures 4,410 mm in length, 1,800 mm in width, and 1,660 mm in height, with a wheelbase of 2,620 mm. At launch, pricing in Cambodia ranged from US$23,500 to US$26,500 depending on trim level.
