= Moskvitch 3 =

Russian compact crossover SUV

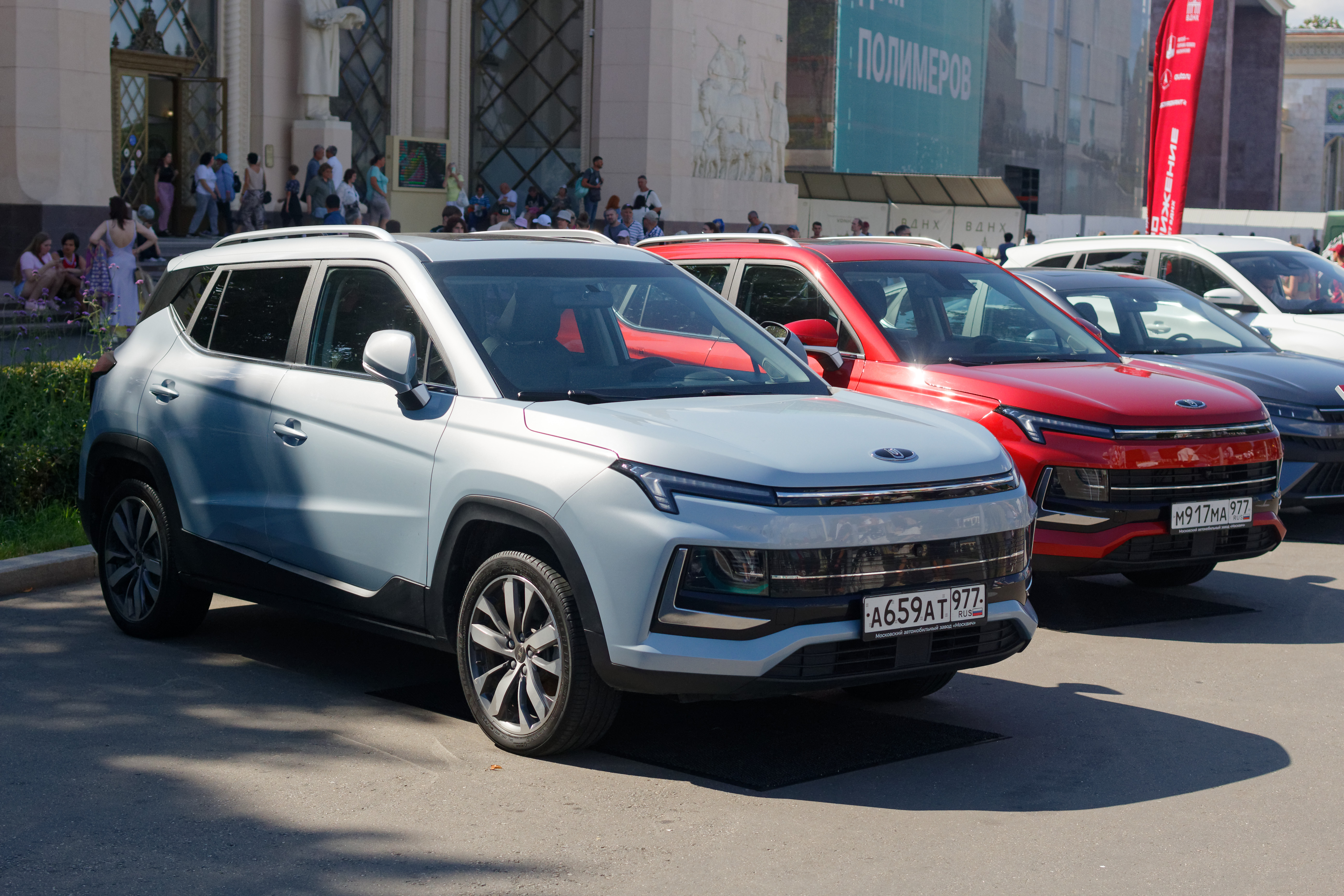

Overview
- Manufacturer: Moskvitch
- Production: 2022–present
- Assembly: Russia: Moscow (JSC Moscow Automobile Plant Moskvitch)

Body and chassis
- Class: Compact crossover SUV (C)
- Body style: 5-door SUV
- Layout: Front engine, front wheel drive
- Related: Sehol X4

Powertrain
- Engine: Petrol: 1.5 L JAC HFC4GB24D I4 turbo
- Electric motor: 1xPMSM (3e)
- Power output: Moskvitch 3 - 150 hp; Moskvitch 3e - 193hp
- Transmission: 6-speed manual CVT; 1-speed direct-drive (3e)
- Battery: Li-ion battery (3e): 65.7 kWh
- Electric range: 410 km (254.8 mi)
- Plug-in charging: IEC 62196 Type 2

Dimensions
- Wheelbase: 2,620 mm (103.1 in)
- Length: 4,410 mm (173.6 in)
- Width: 1,800 mm (70.9 in)
- Height: 1,660 mm (65.4 in)
- Curb weight: Moskvitch 3 - 1,815 kg (4,001 lb); Moskvitch 3e - 2,175 kg (4,795 lb)

The Moskvitch 3 (Russian: Москви́ч 3) is a compact crossover SUV produced by Moskvitch in Russia since 2022. The vehicle is a locally assembled rebadged version of the Sehol X4 by JAC Motors, produced using semi knock-down kits in cooperation with Russian truck and engine manufacturer Kamaz.

== History ==
The Moskvitch 3 is the first vehicle to be launched by the revived JSC Moscow Automobile Plant Moskvitch. However, it bears little commonality to the vehicles produced by the company in its previous iteration, which was known for its saloons and hatchbacks during the era of the Soviet Union. The revival of the company is part of a broader effort by the Russian government to support the Russian domestic car industry, in the face of international sanctions and the withdrawal of several brands from the country. In 2022, Renault Russia divested from its automobile plant in Moscow, previously known as Avtoframos and unrelated to the bankrupt AZLK. The plant was taken over by the Government of Moscow in 2022, and renamed the JSC Automobile Factory Moskvitch.

Production of the Moskvitch 3 at the restarted plant began in November 2022, with the details of the vehicle revealed in the following days

In April 2023, the Moscow City Duma proposed to sell its existing Toyota Camry based fleet, replacing them with the Moskvitch 3.

In July 2023, the Chairman of the State Duma, Vyacheslav Volodin suggested focusing on cars produced in Russia, such as those produced by Lada, as well as Moskvitch. The Minister of Finance, Anton Siluanov, supported the initiative through promising to provide assistance. The Chairman stated:

"We can make the same decision with you regarding the cars used by deputies of the State Duma: we have Moskvitch, we have Lada, we have Aurus. In our power, as soon as possible the fleet of cars of the State Duma should be replenished with Lada and Moskvitch."

== Production ==
The production of the Moskvitch 3 is planned in three stages. From the start of production in November 2022, vehicles are manufactured using semi knock-down kits with the assistance of Russian manufacturer Kamaz, as well as foreign manufacturer JAC Motors. In stage II, planning to begin in 2024, it is planned to increase the localisation of manufacturing, through the attraction of Russian suppliers for components such as body panels and control systems. In stage III in the near future, near full local production of vehicles is anticipated.

Anticipated Production Schedule
	2022	2023	2024	2025
Moskvitch 3	400	40,000	80,000	95,000
Moskvitch 3e	200	10,000	20,000	25,000

In mid July 2023, the company reported that they had produced more than 11,000 vehicles since the start of production. The company further stated that they would stop vehicle production for the wellbeing of their workers from the 22nd of July, with production continuing on the 6th of August.

== Models ==
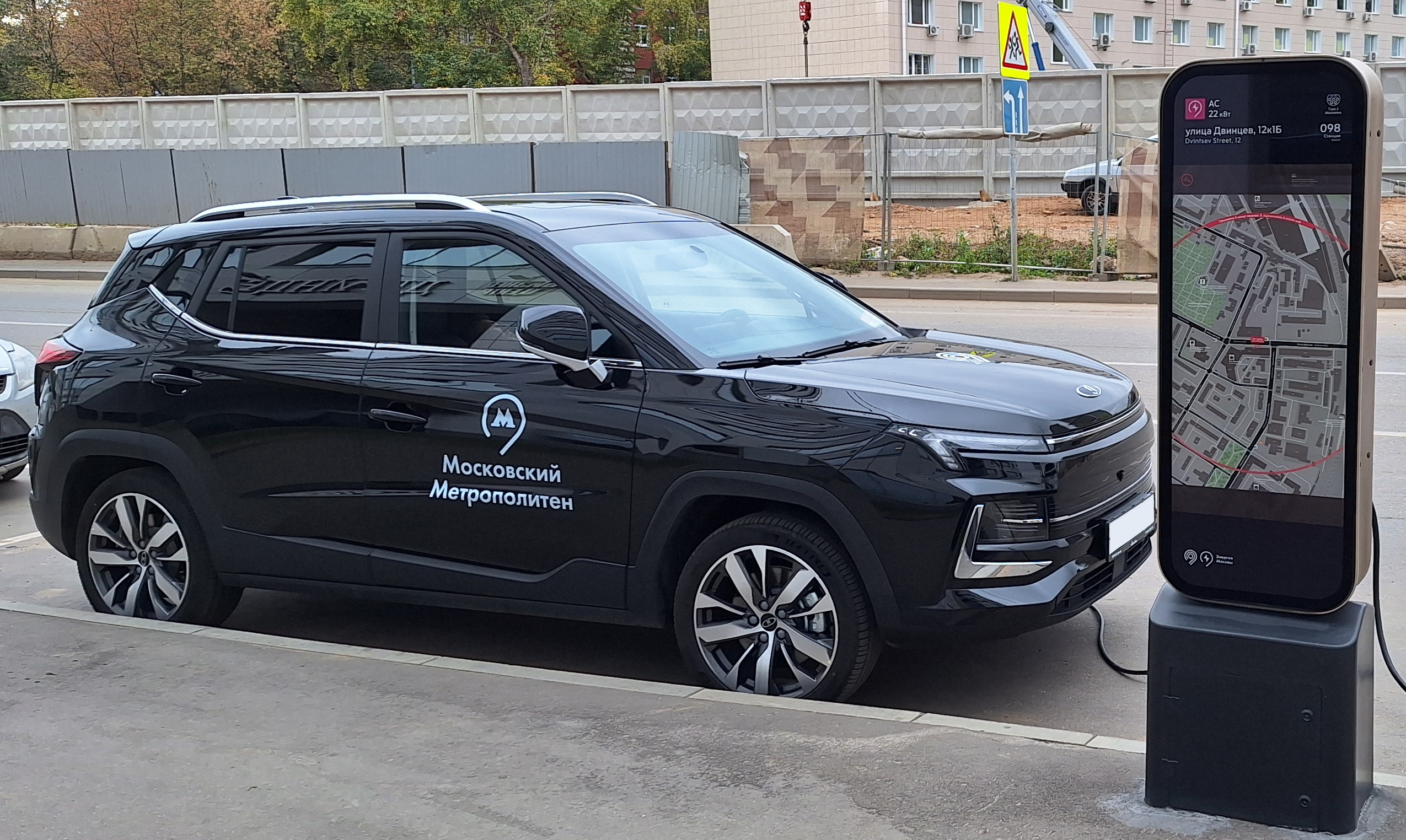
Moskvitch 3e

- Moskvitch 3 (2022–present) - Standard model derived from the Sehol X4, available with a 1.5 L engine with either a 6 speed manual transmission or CVT.
- Moskvitch 3e (2022–present) - Replaces the 1.5 L engine of the Moskvitch 3 with a 193 hp electric motor producing 340 N m of torque, and a battery with the range of 410 km.
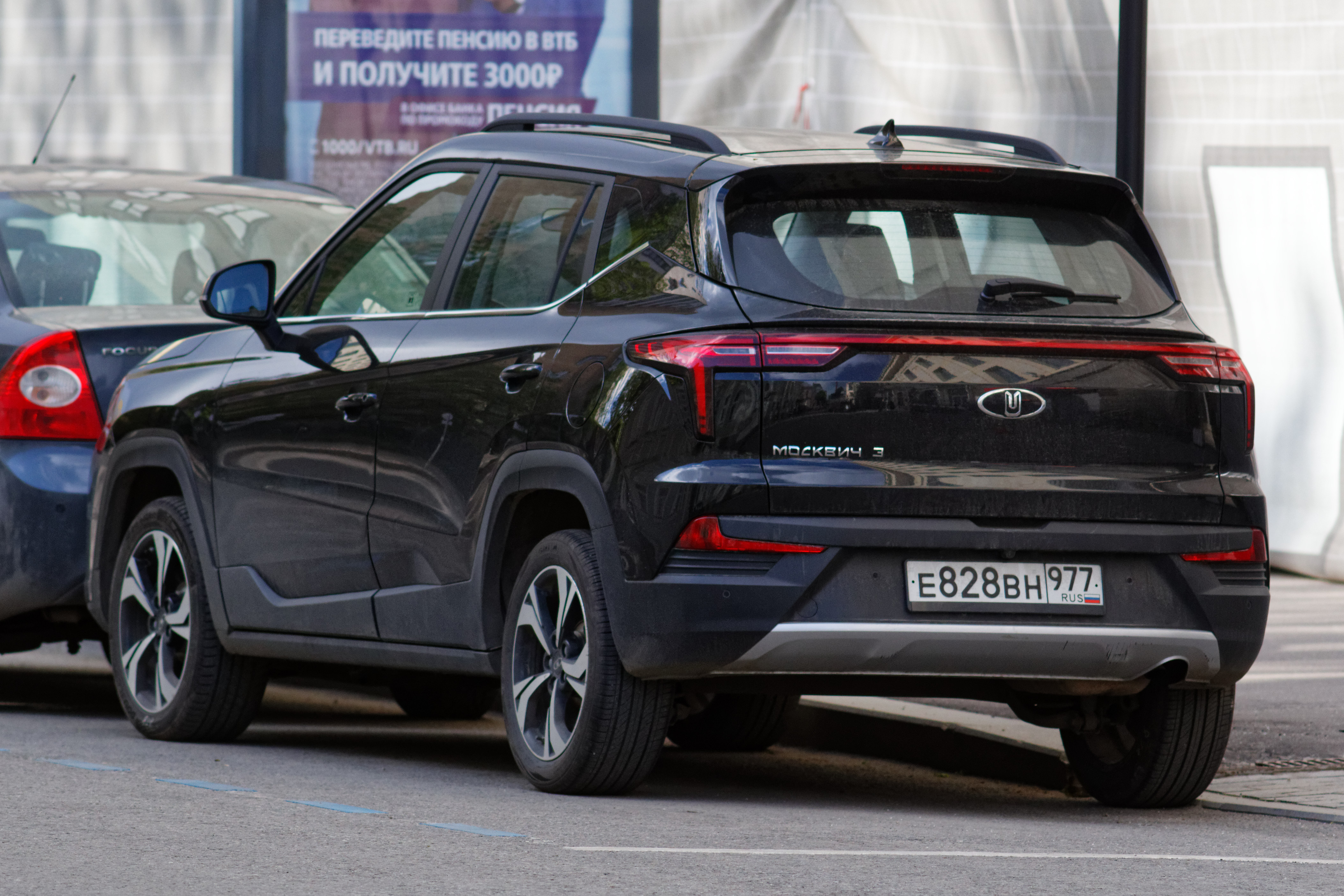
- Moskvitch 3 (Rear)
  Moskvitch 3 Comfort (2023–present) - In April 2023, Moskvitch announced a higher spec option for the Moskvitch 3, named the Moskvitch 3 Comfort. The vehicle is only available with a 1.5 L engine with CVT. This model includes additional features such as fully LED lights, digital gauge cluster, automatic folding mirrors, multi-directional cameras, a forward collision warning system, high beam control, lane departure warning and blind spot monitoring. Further safety improvements include the addition of side airbags and safety curtains as the original model was only equipped with front driver and passenger airbags.

All models are available in white, silver, black, red and blue colour schemes.

== Sales ==
Sales of Moskvitch 3 Vehicles
Month / Year	2023
January	29
February	57
March	500
April	969
May	860
June	1,504
July	2,132
August	
September	
October	
November	
December	
Total	6,051 (July 2023)

In addition to being sold in Russia, the Moskvitch 3 is also available in other countries in the CIS, including Belarus, Kazakhstan and Abkhazia.

== Operators ==
State Operators

- Russia
  - Main Directorate for Traffic Safety
  - Ministry of Health
  - Moscow City Administrative Technical Inspection Association
  - Moscow Construction Supervision Agency
  - National Guard of Russia
  - Police of Russia

Civil Operators

- Russia
  - Belkacar
  - Citydrive
  - Citymobil
  - Taxovichkof
  - Yandex Drive
  - Yandex Taxi

== See also ==
- Moskvitch
- Kamaz
- Sehol X4
