= Neftekamsk Automotive Plant =

Russian manufacturer of buses and truck bodies

Neftekamsky Automobile Plant
- Company type: public company
- Traded as: MCX: NFAZ
- Founded: 1972; 54 years ago
- Headquarters: Neftekamsk, Bashkortostan, Russia
- Key people: Sergey Zuykov (CEO)
- Products: buses, dump trucks, tanker trucks, trailers, accessories
- Owner: Kamaz (50,02%); Government of Bashkortostan (28,5)
- Number of employees: 8200 (for the year 14.07.2010)
- Website: www.nefaz.ru

Neftekamsk Automotive Plant (NefAZ, Russian: Нефтекамский автозавод) is a Russian manufacturer of buses and machinery on KamAZ chassis located in Neftekamsk in Bashkortostan.

== History ==
On 25 December 1970, the Council of Ministers of Construction issued an order that a "plant for the production of dump trucks and winches" would be built in Neftekamsk. The USSR's Minister of the Automotive Industry approved a similar resolution on 8 January 1971 and constructions started on 13 July 1972. The first KamAZ-5511 ten-ton dump truck was assembled on 15 April 1977 and mass production began on 11 October. The State Commission approved the plant to produce trucks on 31 October. Bus production began in 1981. The 100,000th KamAZ-5511 was finished on 19 May 1982. The factory became the Open Joint Stock Company NefAZ in 1993. The plant began developing large capacity city buses in August 2000 and presented the first large urban bus, the NefAZ-5299, on 6 December. A restyled version was produced in 2004 and a low-entry version was released in 2007. In 2005, NefAZ sold 1,156 buses. Since January 2007, the company has worked with Dutch firms DAF Trucks and VDL Groep on bus production. The company was affected by the Great Recession and had to reduce production technology. They began downsizing the number of employees, going from 11,399 on 18 July 2008 to 9,588 on 13 July 2009. Before this, NefAZ occupied about 30% of the Russian bus market.

In 2009, NefAZ and AGCO signed a joint venture agreement to manufacture Challenger Equipment combine harvesters under the AGCO-NEFAZ-Challenger brand. Products included the Challenger 647. By 2010, NEFAZ was the largest automobile corporation in the Russian Federation. In 2012, NefAZ brought to market the Marcopolo SA bus, produced on a KamAZ chassis in a joint venture with a Brazilian manufacturer. The electric bus NefAZ-5262 was released in August of that year and NefAZ continued the development and production of Euro-4 and Euro-5 class cars with a combo drive. In 2013, the company began production of the second generation of the NefAZ-5299 bus.

In 2012, revenue amounted to 10.059 billion rubles. Operating profit was 509.5 million rubles, more than 1.5 million more than anticipated, and net income sat at 52.5 million rubles. In 2018, KAMAZ owned 50.02% of the company and the Republic of Bashkortostan held 28.5%.

NefAZ's manufactures dump trucks, shift buses, trucks, trailers, semi-tank, city and inter-urban buses, midibuses, and agricultural machines, among other vehicles. The NefAZ-5299 is perhaps the company's best-known vehicle. Its first generation took place between 2001 and 2004 and had a front similar to that of the MAZ-103 bus. It was a high-floor vehicle with headlights on its bumper and two sets of rectangular rear lights. The second generation (2004–2013) had a flat front with a false radiator grille flanked by two rectangular headlights. The design maintained its rear lights, but added a circular parking light and turn signal to the front bumper. In 2007, the low-entry version was first produced, with a second version in 2012. The third generation (2013-present) has circular vertical headlights and rear lights and a new body style.

== Awards ==
Year	Award	Model	Notes	Ref(s)
2001	Best Goods of Bashkortostan	NEFAZ-5299	Urban bus	
2001	100 best goods of Russia	NEFAZ-5299	Urban bus	
2001	State Prize of the Republic of Bashkortostan	-	Company CEO, technical director and chief pilot awarded prize in Science and Technology for the creation of design, technology and organization of production of passenger buses	
2002	Best Goods of Bashkortostan	NEFAZ-5299-01	Shuttle bus	
2002	100 best goods of Russia	NEFAZ-5299-01	Shuttle bus	
2003	Best Goods of Bashkortostan	NEFAZ-5299-10	Intercity bus	
2003	100 best goods of Russia	NEFAZ-5299-10	Intercity bus	
2003	Diploma and the Government of the Republic of Belarus Cup	-	"For the contribution to the economic development of the Republic of Bashkortostan"	
2004	Diploma and the Government of the Republic of Belarus Cup	-	"For the contribution to the economic development of the Republic of Bashkortostan"	
2004	1000 Best of enterprises and organizations of Russia	-	"For efficient operation, high achievements and stable operation"	
2004	Best Russian Exporter	-	Honorary Diploma from the Ministry of Economic Development	
2005	Best Goods of Bashkortostan	NEFAZ-52991	Tourist bus	
2005	100 best goods of Russia	NEFAZ-52991	Tourist bus	
2005	1000 Best of enterprises and organizations of Russia	-	"For efficient operation, high achievements and stable operation"	
2005	Diploma and the Government of the Republic of Belarus Cup	-	"For the contribution to the economic development of the Republic of Bashkortostan"	
2006	Diploma and the Government of the Republic of Belarus Cup	-	"For the contribution to the economic development of the Republic of Bashkortostan"	
2006	Best Industrial Company of the Republic of Bashkortostan	-		
2006	100 best goods of Russia	NEFAZ-52-99-10-15	Bus transportation for disabled people	
2007	Best Industrial Company of the Republic of Bashkortostan	-		
2007	Diploma and the Government of the Republic of Belarus Cup	-	"For the contribution to the economic development of the Republic of Bashkortostan"	
2007	100 best goods of Russia	NEFAZ-VDL-52997	Low-entry city bus	
2008	100 best goods of Russia	NEFAZ-VDL-52999	Tourist bus	
2009	100 best goods of Russia	NEFAZ-VDL-52996	Intercity bus	
2010	100 best goods of Russia	NEFAZ-VDL-52998	15-meter bus	
2011	100 best goods of Russia	NEFAZ-5299-30-31	Passenger bus	

== Gallery ==
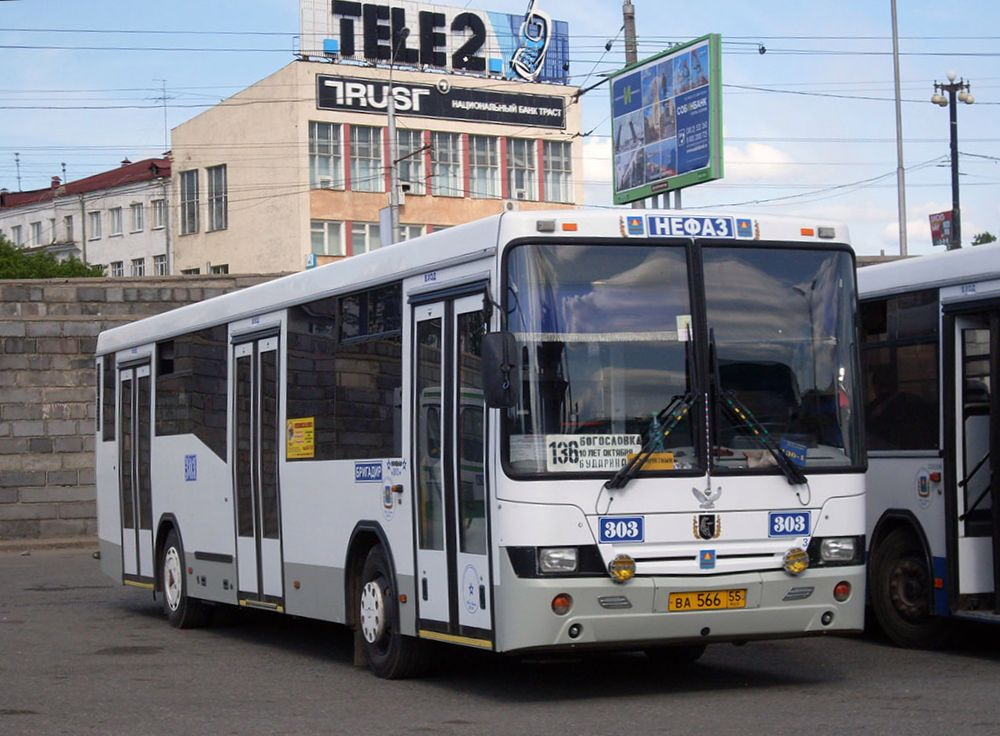
NefAZ-5299 (2010)

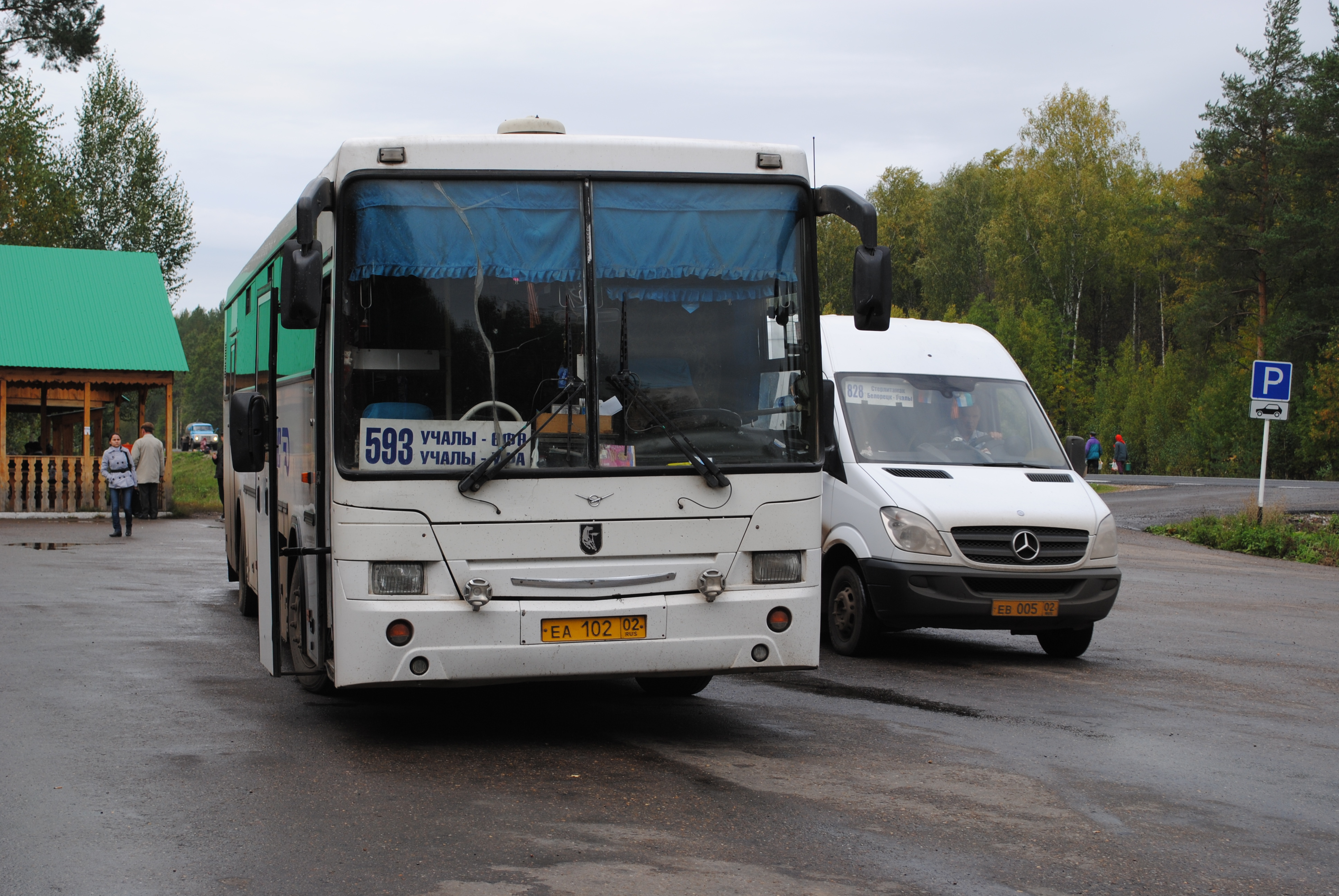
NefAZ (produced in 2004–2013) on long-distance routes

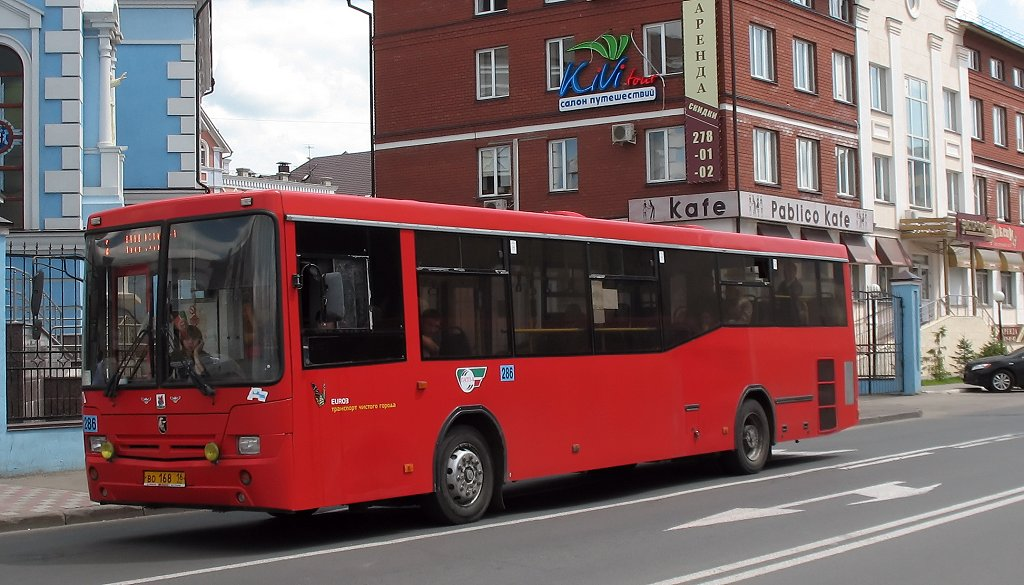
NefAZ-5299 shuttle bus

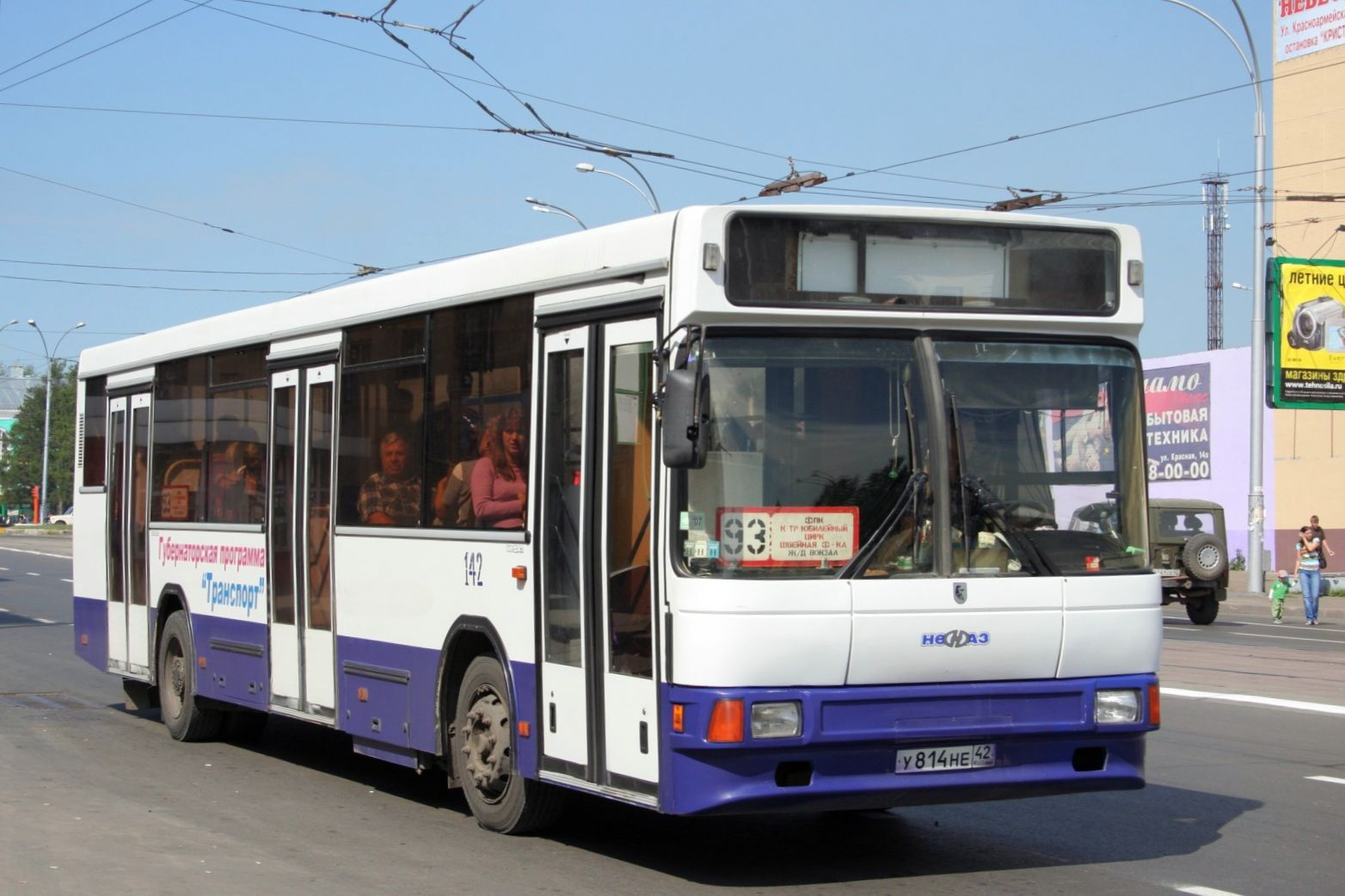
NefAZ shuttle bus (produced in 2000–2004)

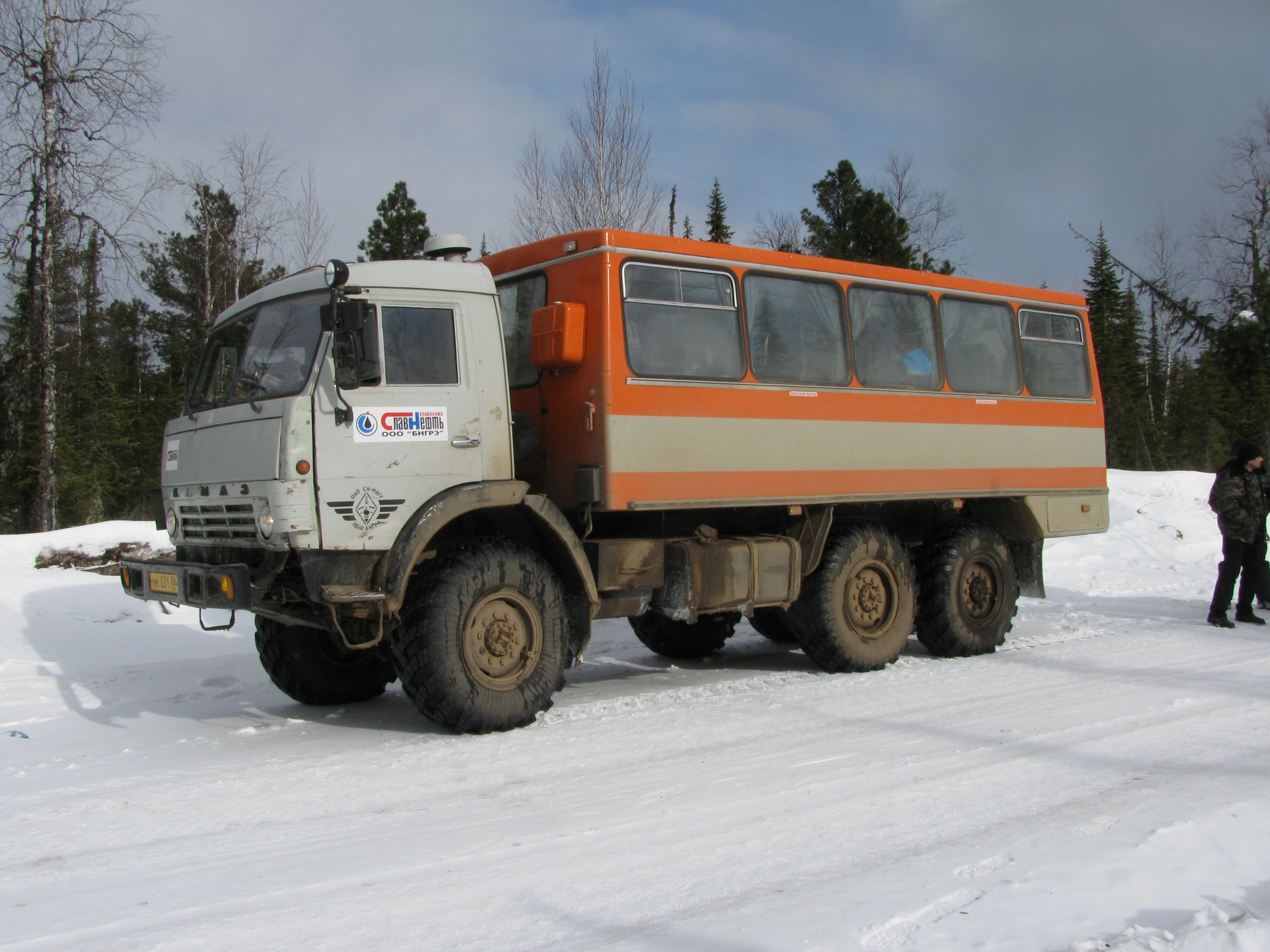
NefAZ-4208/4951 shift bus

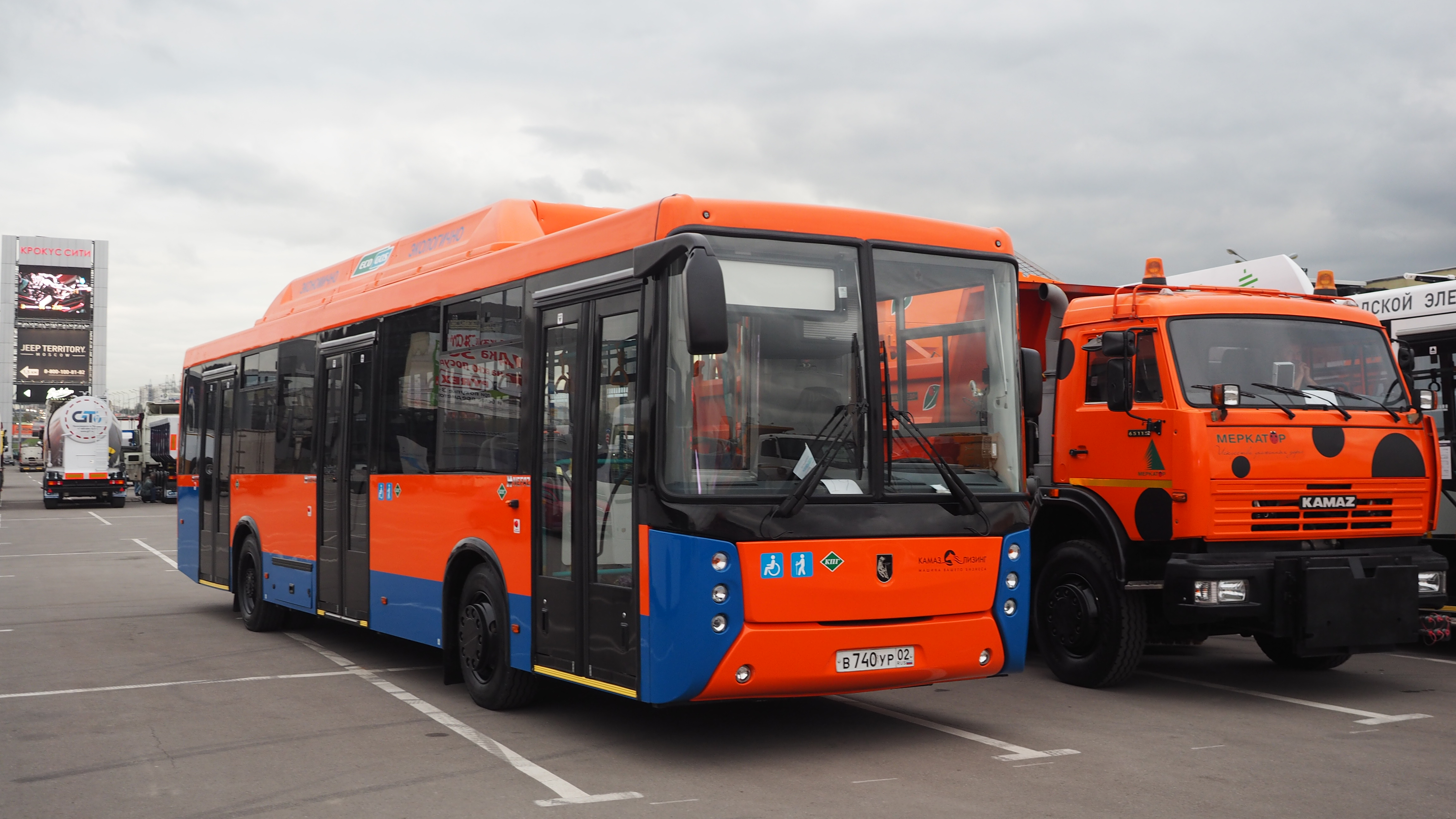
NefAZ-5299 2nd generation CNG

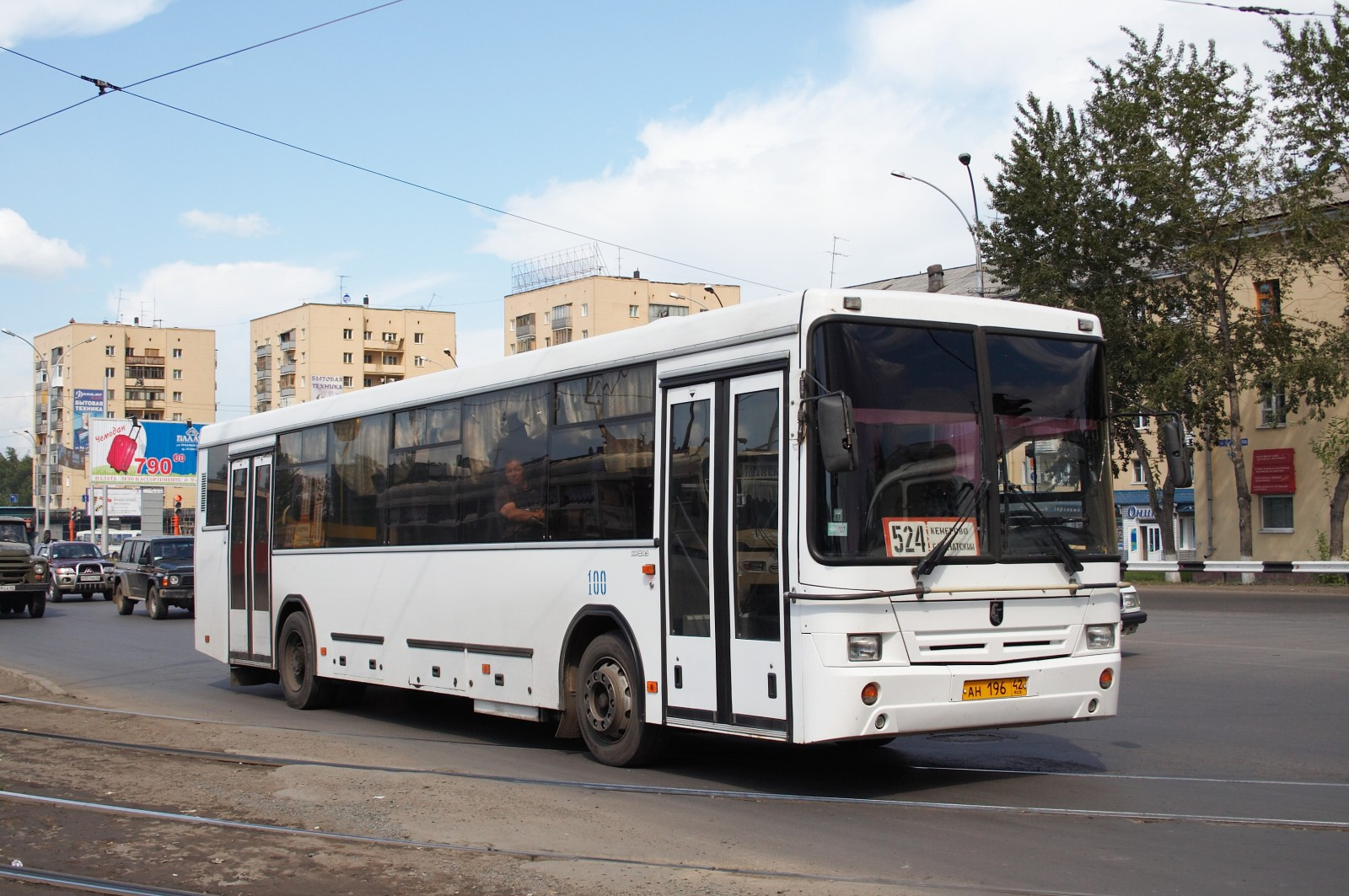
NefAZ-5299 suburban bus

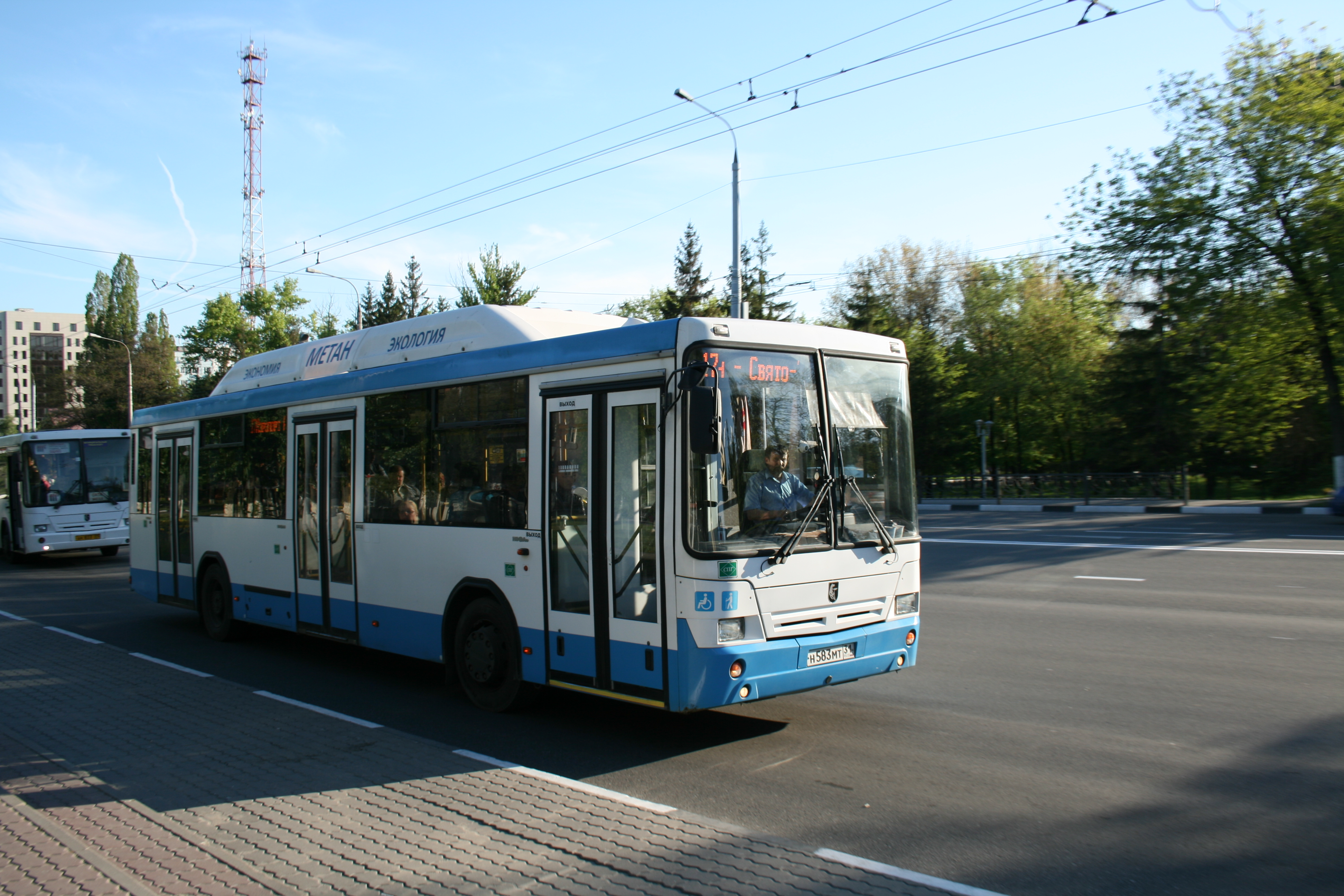
NefAZ bus with methane gas engine

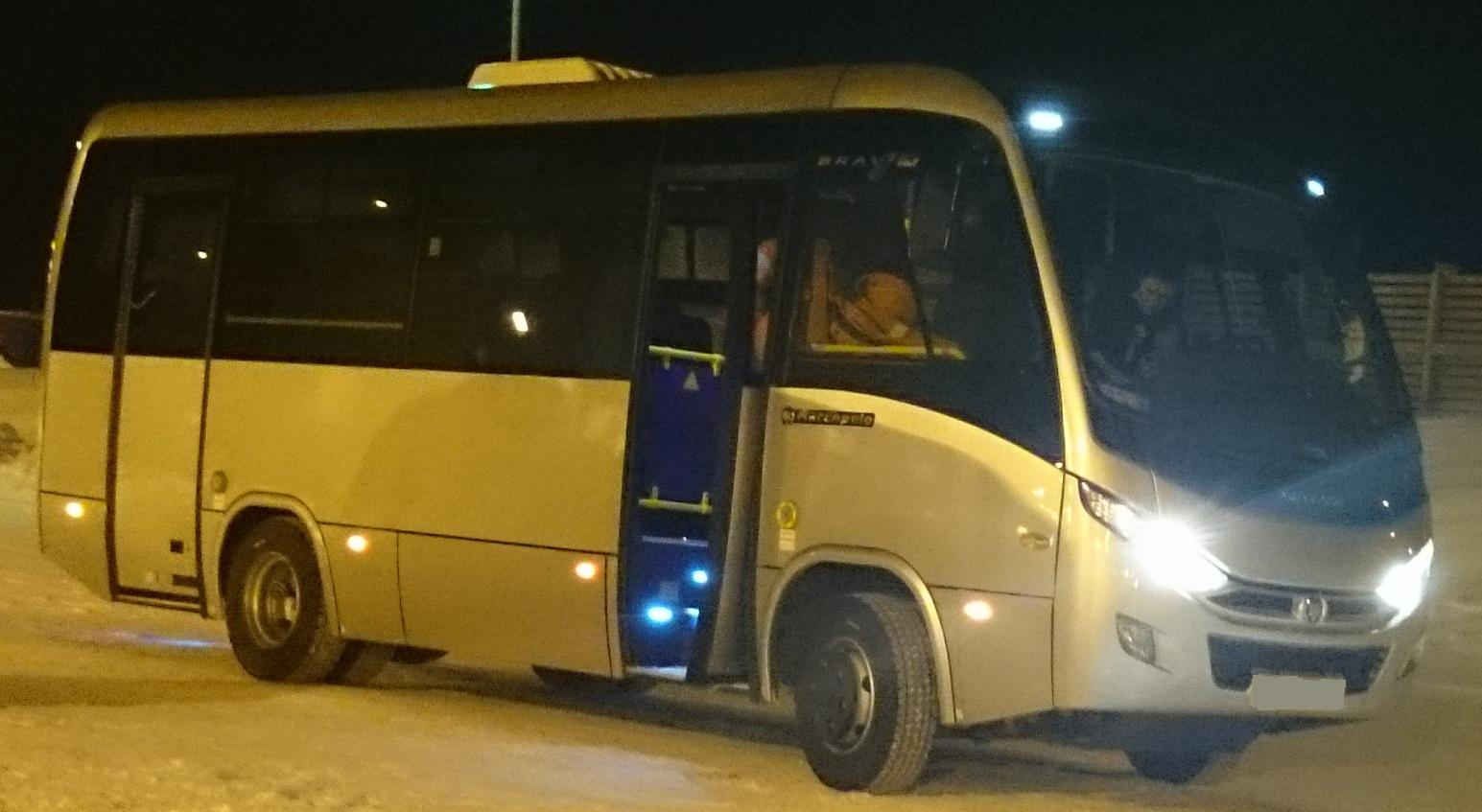
Marcopolo Bravis assembled by NefAZ plant
