= List of NefAZ buses =

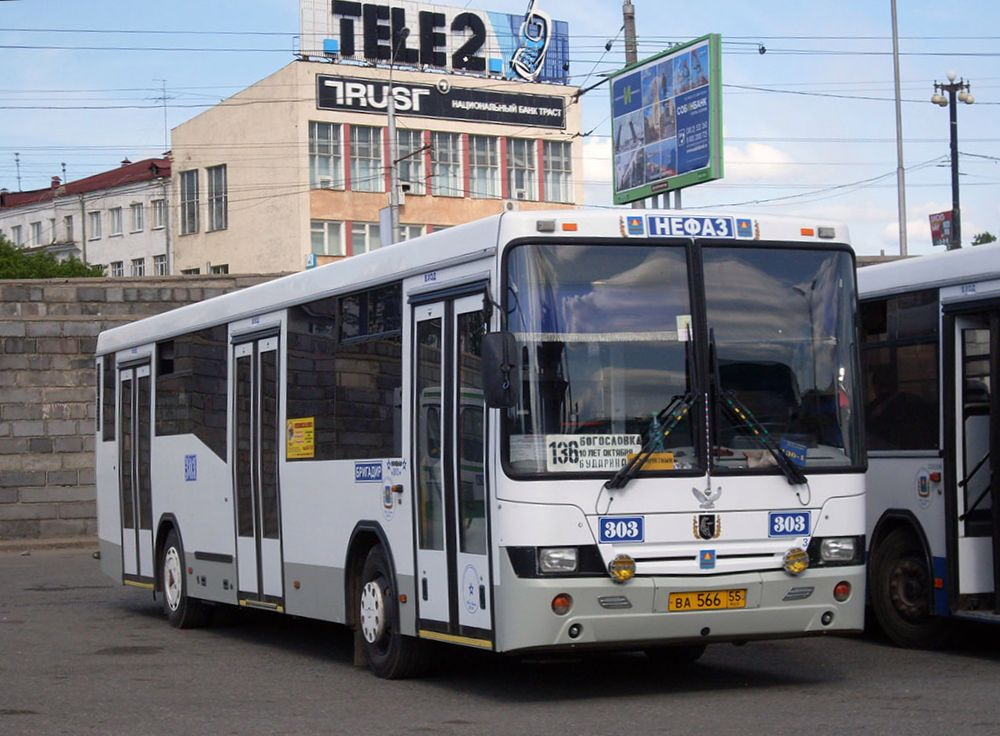
Bus NefAZ-5299 Route 136 on the street. Budarina in 2010 (Omsk)

Neftekamsk Automotive Plant (NefAZ) is a Russian manufacturer of city buses located in the city of Neftekamsk, Bashkortostan.

== Bus models ==
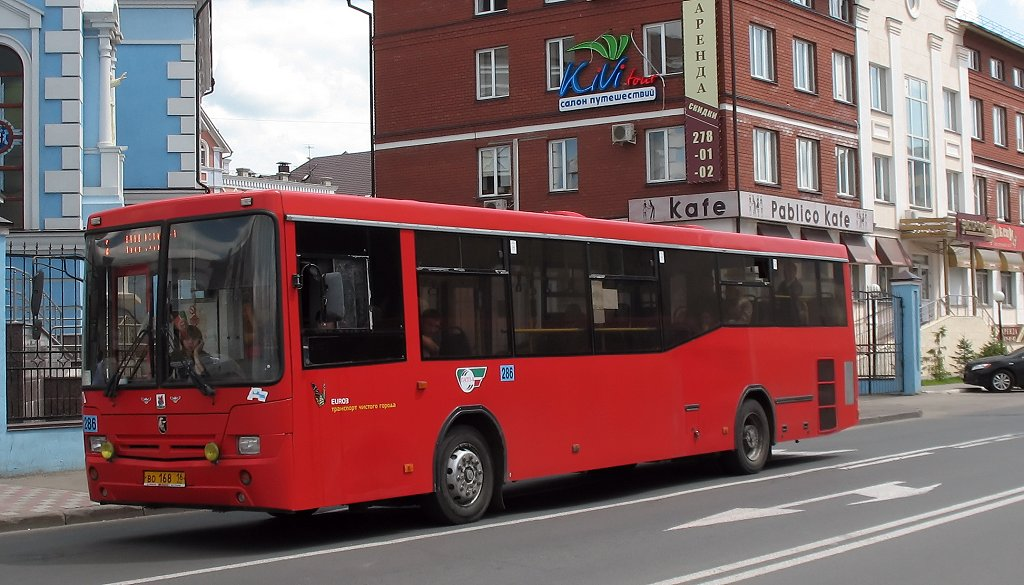
NefAZ 5299 bus in Kazan, (supplied several hundred red buses during and after the urban transport reform in 2007)

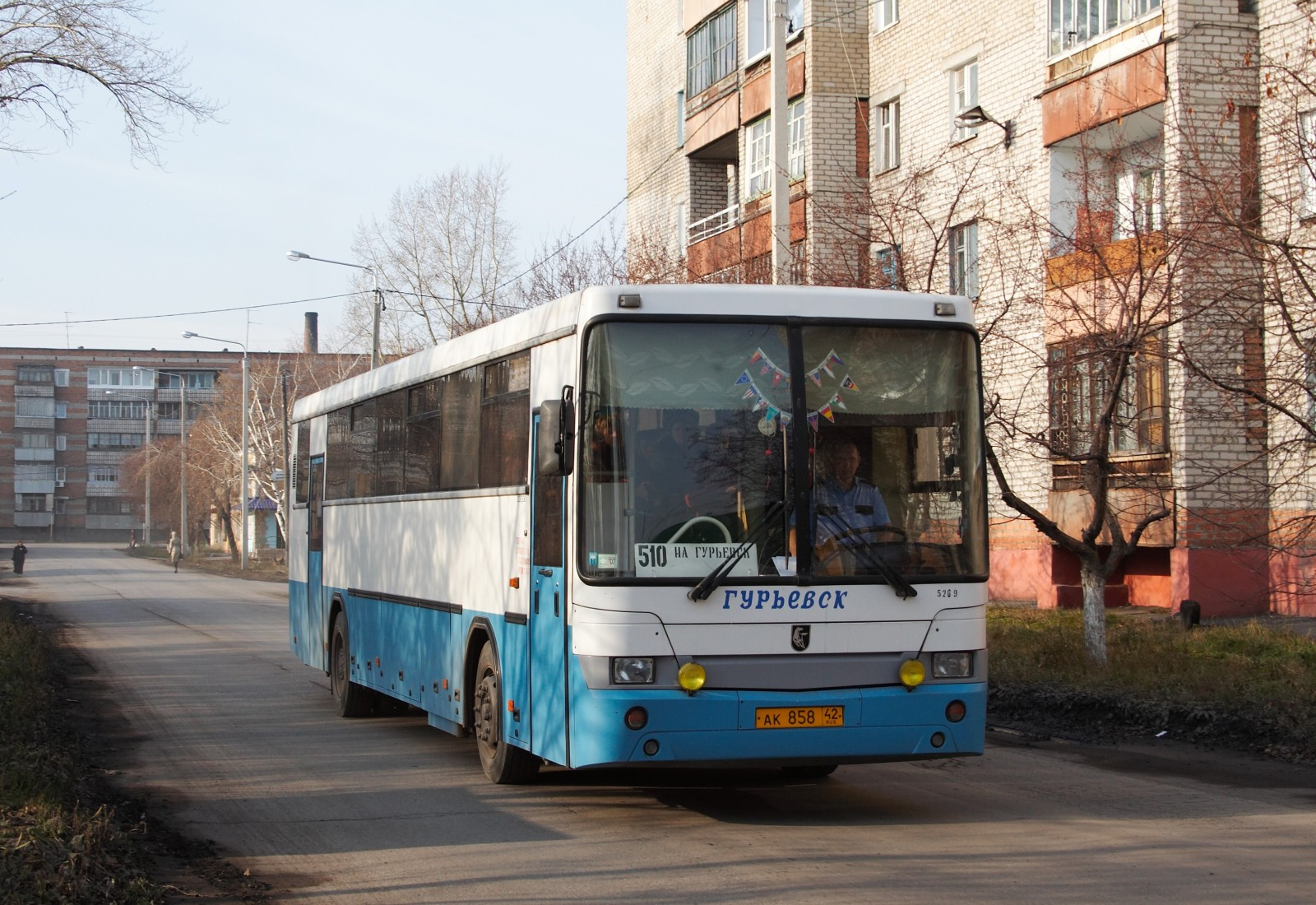
NefAZ 5299 intercity bus

In 1981, NefAZ began manufacturing buses, including public buses. In 2005, NefAZ manufactured 1,255 buses, selling up to 1,150 buses that year. These buses are available on chassis-terrain trucks KAMAZ 4310 (4208/4951), KAMAZ 4326 (4211), Ural-4320 (42112) GAZ-66 (3964). The NefAZ product line includes the polunizkopolnye and low floor (5,299 ...) buses, as well as a small class (3,299), mid-class (4,299) and articulated models extra-large class (52,995). Some of these models were developed with the co-operation of Dutch-Belgian group DAF - VDL (32,997/52,995 ...) and the German Daimler (42,997). Buses can be equipped with domestically-produced engines as well as engines licensed from Cummins and DAF. Several of these models were awarded either "Best Goods of Bashkortostan," or "100 Best Goods of Russia".

== NefAZ-4208 ==
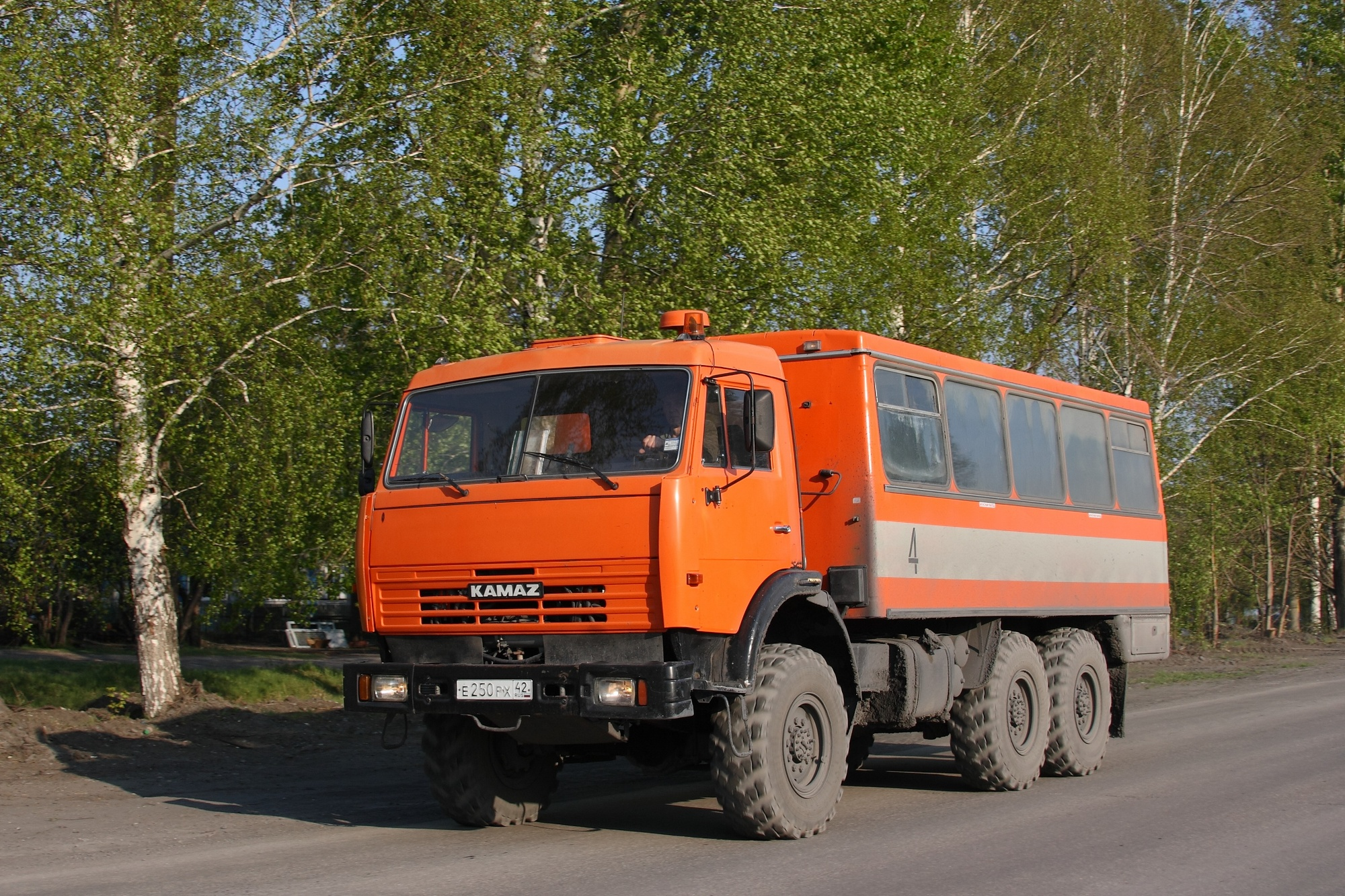
NefAZ 4208 off-road bus in the village of Bachatsky

The original shuttle bus, the NefAZ-4208/4951, with a full weight of 9900 kg, was created on the KamAZ-43101/43114 (6x6) chassis with a 220-260 hp Diesel engine KAMAZ-740. It was designed for 29 seats plus two separate places in the driver's cabin, had glazed windows with a metal body with reinforced thermal insulation and a single side door with maximum speed of 85 km/h. A similar shuttle bus, the NefAZ-4211 is based on the 240-strong chassis KAMAZ-4326 (4x4) on a lightweight 1150 kg 2-door body with 26 seats.

== NefAZ-5299 ==
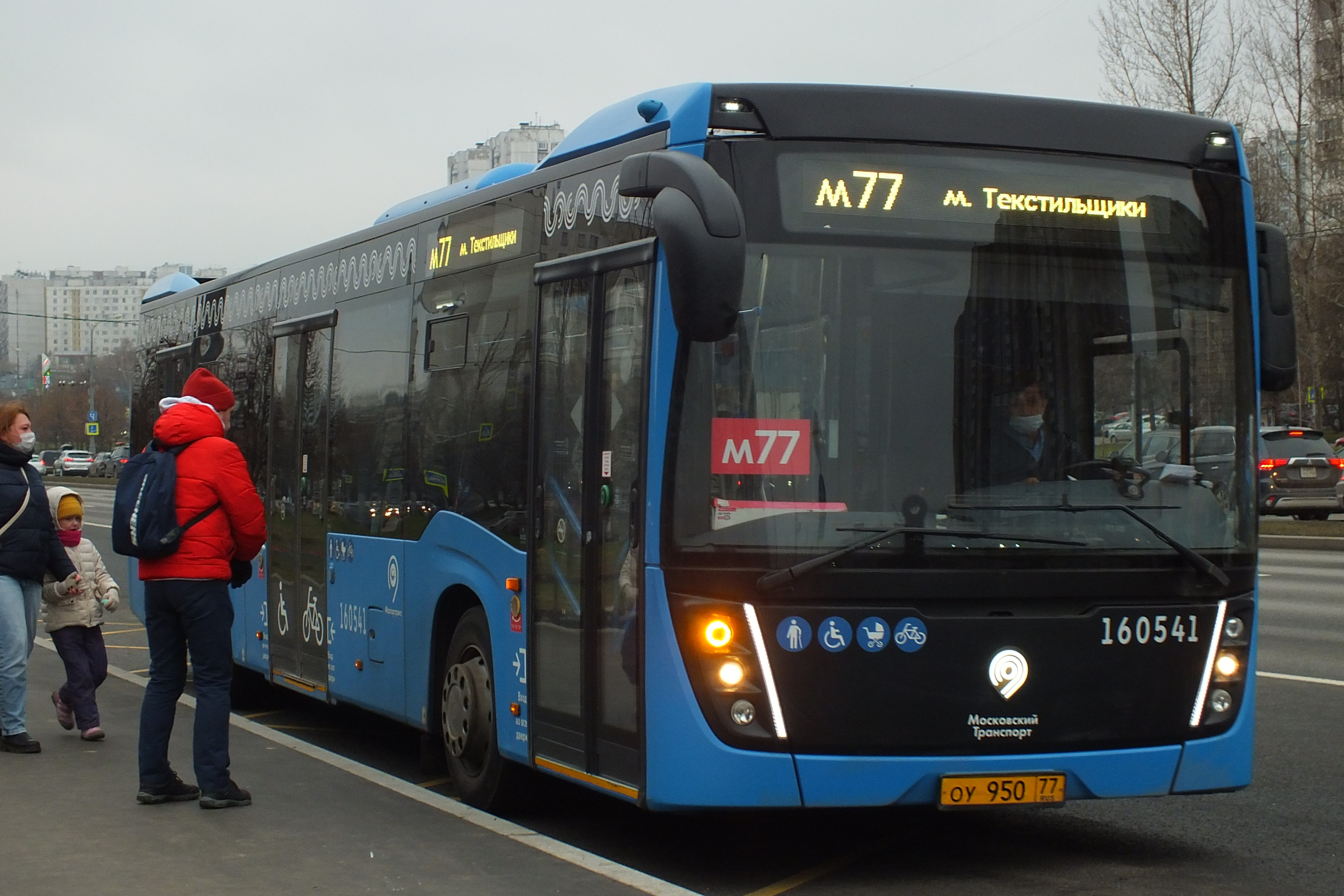
NefAZ 5299 suburban bus

Large buses created on the local bus chassis KamAZ -5297. Available in different versions: Urban vysokomol, low floor and polunizkopolnye, Commuter, Intercity, Travel. It is currently one of the most purchased Russian buses. The buses designed by NefAZ have a roomy interior and are equipped with three double-wing passenger side doors. Inside, 115 seats, 25 of which are for sitting in the low-floor and polunizkopolnoy modifications can accommodate a wheelchair, and the median door is equipped with a ramp. Ventilation is provided by three ceiling hatches with electric and air vents. The interior features two storage sites in the middle and rear of the cabin (with the exception of low-floor model). The driver's cab is separated from the passenger compartment by a partition with windows, but by request, a door can be installed. The suburban modification has two doors and comfortable seating for passengers with seat belts suitable for long distance, and still have enough space for carrying luggage. At the same time as the Serial production of the model was launched in 2001, the suburban option was introduced for the transportation of 45 passengers and with this the first samples of an apron bus. Currently, buses are available with several engine options, including both Cummins and KAMAZ. In 2010, the production of gas turbine buses methane commenced.

== NefAZ-3299 ==
Small buses, which in the future can be used on small commercial routes instead PAZ, Gazelle. Designed in two versions: the urban and inter-urban. After the release of about 40 small buses production was suspended.

== NefAZ-Daimler-42997 ==
Released prototype of the city bus of the middle class, for which the production has not been delivered.

== VDL-NefAZ ==
Buses of this model appeared in 2007 as a result of a joint venture between Neff and VDL. The result is a series of buses named VDL-NefAZ, different models produced are:

- VDL-NefAZ-52995

Experienced low-floor articulated bus extra large class released in several copies, which are tested at the factory and in Ufa.

- VDL-NefAZ-52996

This is a high-end motor coach, which in 2009 was the winner of the "100 best goods of Russia."

== NefAZes in games ==
The NefAZ 5299 series of buses has been used as a model in computer games: bus simulator OMSI in urban and suburban versions of Grand Theft Auto IV and Grand Theft Auto: San Andreas and in the urban, suburban and long-distance versions of all three GTA games. In addition, a 1:35 scale model was presented at a conference in.
