= JAC Refine S4 =

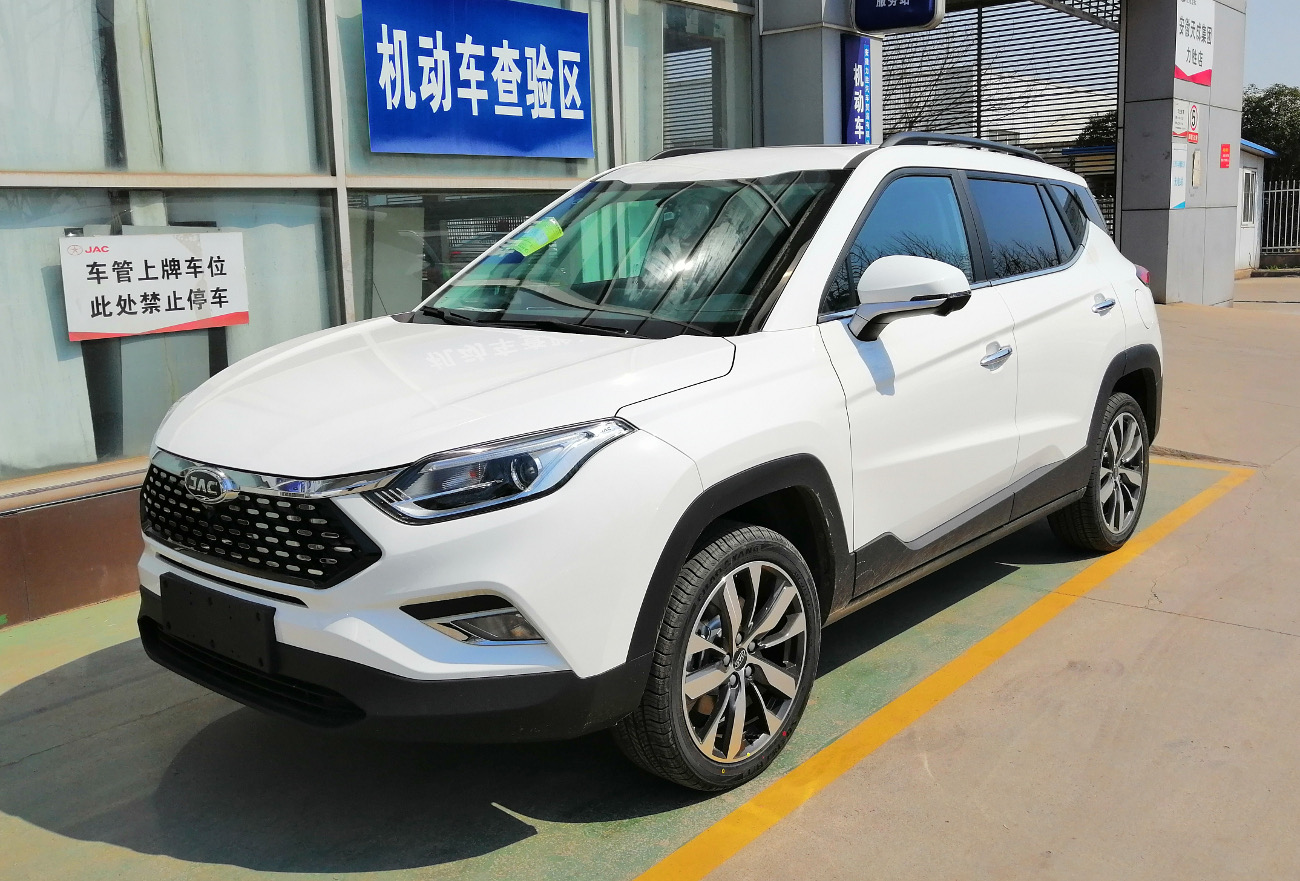

Overview
- Manufacturer: JAC Motors
- Also called: JAC T60; JAC Sei 4 (Mexico); JAC iEVS4; Sehol X4
- Production: 2018–2022
- Assembly: China: Hefei; Mexico: Ciudad Sahagún

Body and chassis
- Class: Compact crossover SUV (C)
- Body style: 5-door SUV
- Layout: Front engine, front wheel drive
- Platform: Jianghuai SS
- Related: Sehol X4

Powertrain
- Engine: Petrol: 1.5 L I4 turbo; 1.6 L I4
- Electric motor: 1×AC PMSM (iEVS4)
- Power output: 88 kW (120 hp; 122 PS) (1.6 L engine); 110 kW (150 hp; 152 PS) (1.5 L turbo engine); 110 kW (150 hp; 152 PS) (iEVS4)
- Transmission: 6-speed manual CVT; 1-speed direct-drive (iEVS4)
- Battery: Li-ion battery: 55–66 kWh (iEVS4)
- Range: 355–470 km (221–292 mi) (iEVS4)
- Plug-in charging: 9.5–11 hours (0 to 100, AC charging); 30–45 minutes (0 to 80, DC charging)

Dimensions
- Wheelbase: 2,620 mm (103.1 in)
- Length: 4,410 mm (173.6 in)
- Width: 1,800 mm (70.9 in)
- Height: 1,660 mm (65.4 in)
- Curb weight: 1,670–1,710 kg (3,682–3,770 lb)

The JAC Refine S4 is a compact crossover SUV produced by Chinese company JAC Motors.

== Overview ==
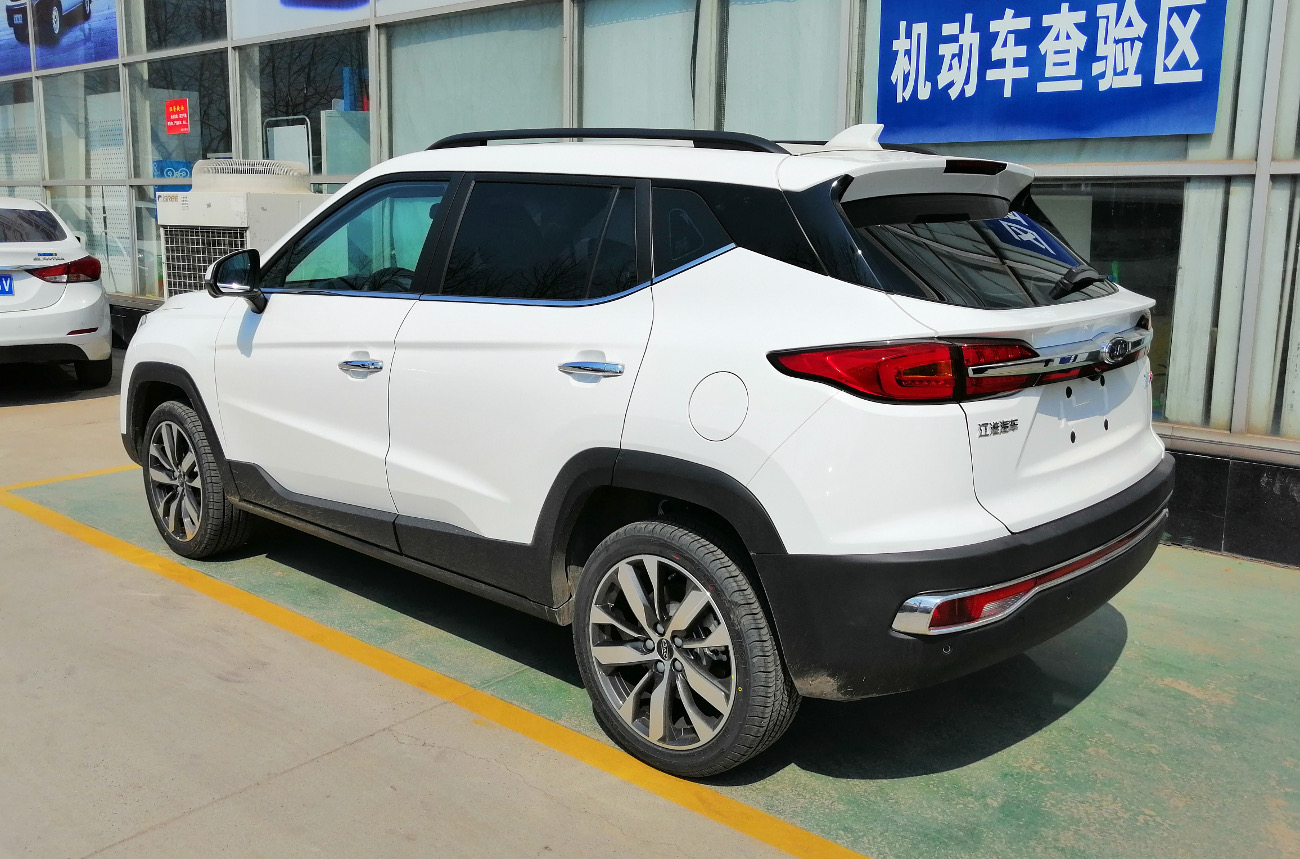
Refine S4 rear

Originally launched on October 30, 2018, the Refine S4 was sold under the Refine sub-brand of JAC Motors. The Refine S4 compact crossover was positioned slightly above the Refine S3 compact crossover and below the Refine S5 compact crossover under the Refine crossover product line.

Pricing of the Refine S4 was revealed during the 2018 Guangzhou Auto Show with prices ranging from 67,800 yuan to 98,800 yuan.

The engine options of the Refine S4 crossover includes a 150 hp (110 kW) for the 1.5 liter turbo engine, and a 120 hp (88 kW) for the 1.6 liter engine mated to a 6-speed manual gearbox or a CVT.

The Refine S4 compact SUV is also made in Mexico from 2019 in CKD kits in the factory of Ciudad Sahagún. Mexican version was rebadged as a JAC Sei 4.

== JAC iEVS4 ==
The JAC iEVS4 is the electric version of the Refine S4, featuring the same designs with only minor differences up front.

The iEVS4 is available in three different ranges, including 355 km, 402 km, and 470 km versions. The 355 km version is equipped with a 55 kWh battery, the 402 km version is equipped with a 61 kWh battery, and the 470 km version is equipped with a 66 kWh battery.

Charging time on fast chargers are 0.75 hours for the 355 km version, 0.5 hours for the 402 km version, and 0.67 hours for the 470 km version to reach up to 80 percent of the battery charged. Charging time on standard chargers are 9.5 hours for the 355 km version, 10.5 hours for the 402 km version, and 11 hours for the 470 km version. All versions are equipped with front positioned 110 kW electric motors with a torque of 330 N-m powering the front wheels.

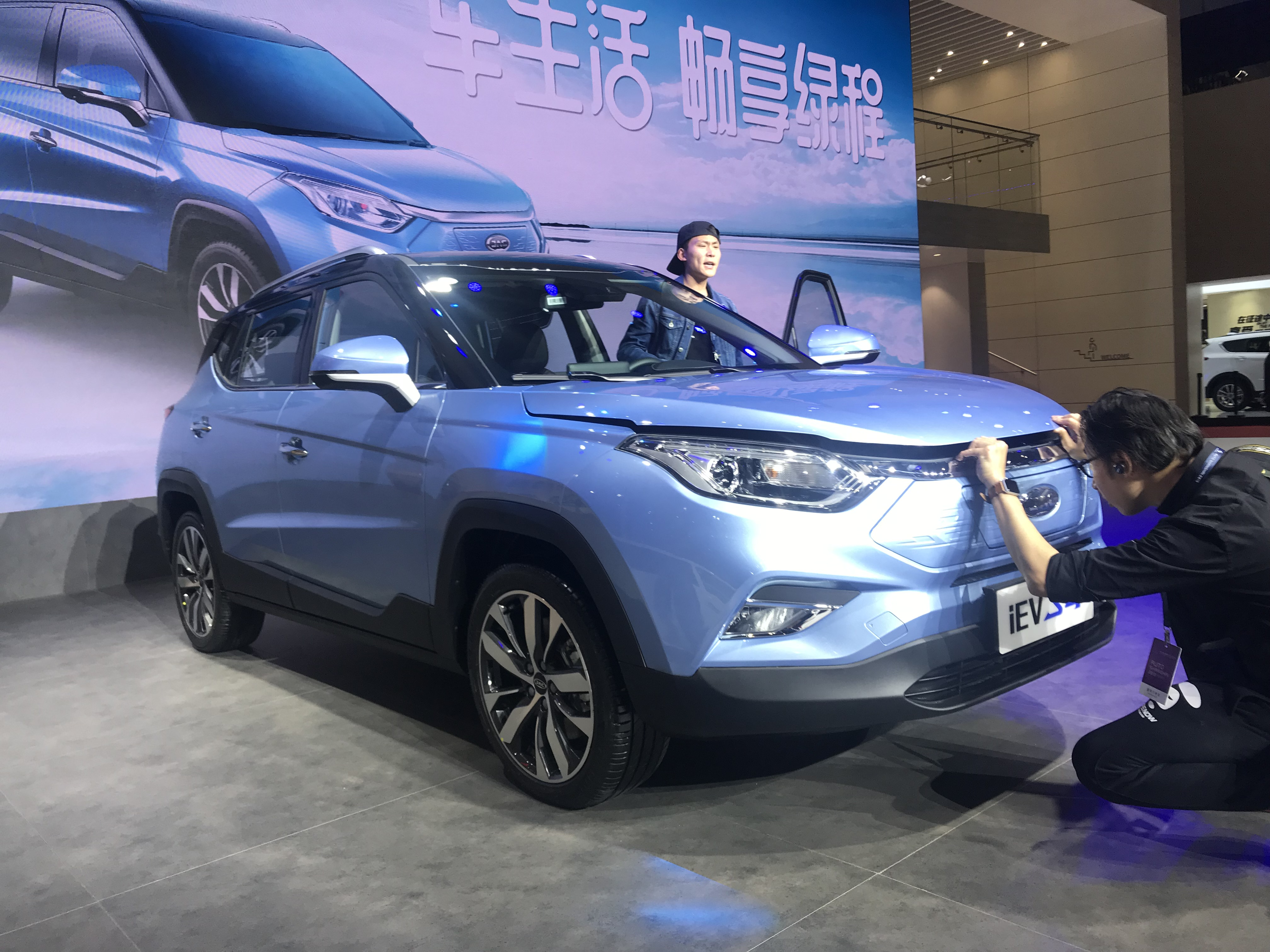
JAC iEVS4 (front)

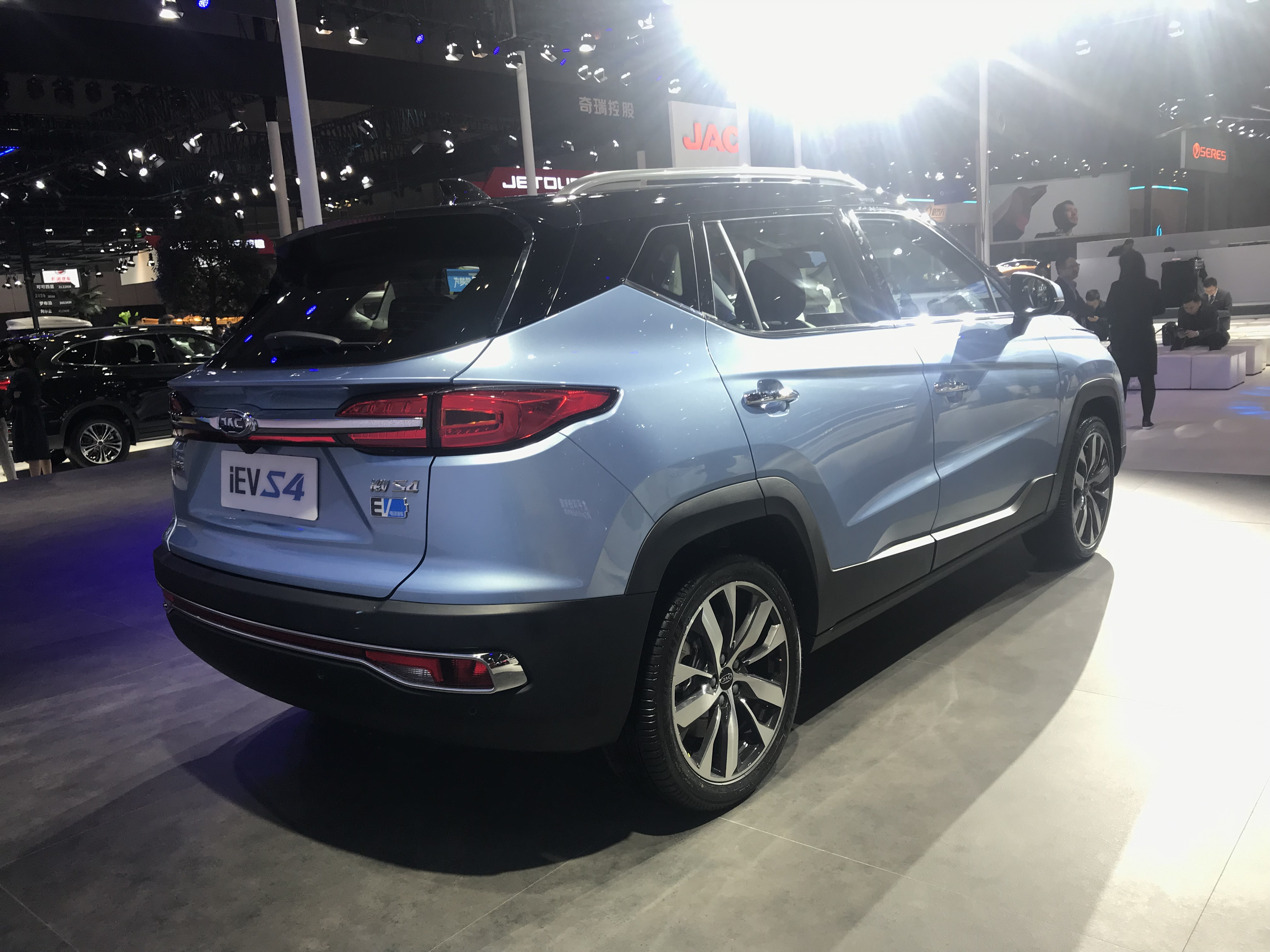
JAC iEVS4 (rear)
