= Remdiesel (Russia) =

Russian automobile plant

The joint-stock company Remdiesel (Russian: Акционерное общество «Ремдизель» is a Russian plant for refurbishing automobiles. The company was founded in Naberezhnye Chelny, Tatarstan in 1978. It is focused on the repair of Kamaz automobiles.
