= Kamaz =

Russian truck brand and engine manufacturer

PJSC KAMAZ

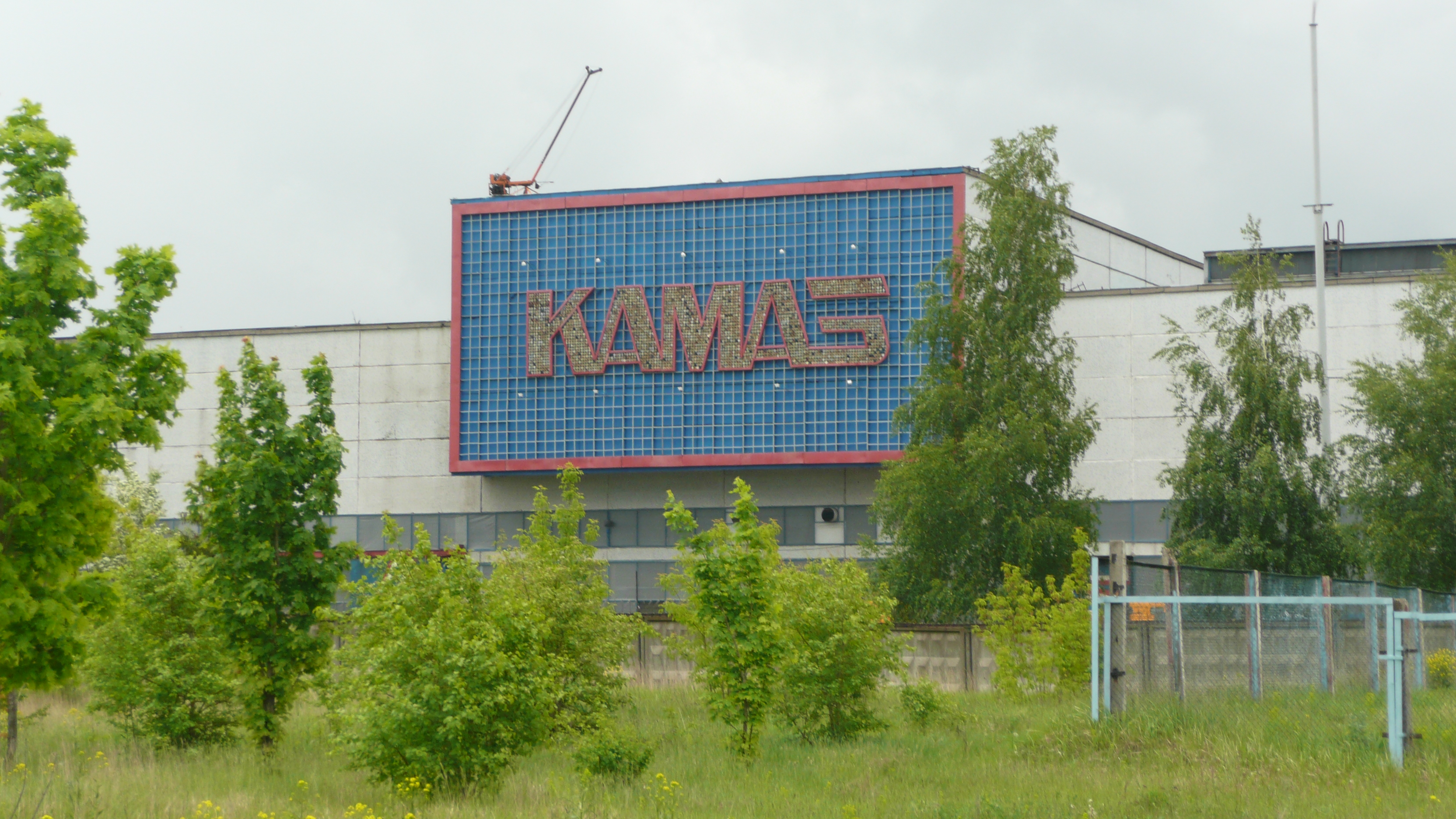
- KAMAZ factory building
- Native name: ПАО "КАМАЗ"
- Type: Public
- Traded as: MCX: KMAZ
- Industry: Automotive
- Founded: 1969; 57 years ago
- Headquarters: Naberezhnye Chelny, Tatarstan, Russia
- Key people: Sergey A. Kogogin, General Director
- Products: Trucks, buses and diesel engines
- Revenue: $2.94 billion (2019)
- Operating income: $67.1 million (2019)
- Net income: −$30.2 million (2019)
- Total assets: $3.18 billion (2019)
- Total equity: $599 million (2019)
- Owners: Rostec (49.9%); Avtoinvest Limited (23.54%)
- Number of employees: 36,000
- Website: kamaz.ru

KAMAZ (Russian: Камский Автомобильный Завод – КАМАЗ, romanized: Kamskiy Avtomobilnyy Zavod, lit. 'Kama Automobile Plant') is a Russian manufacturer of trucks, buses, and engines headquartered in Naberezhnye Chelny.

Founded in 1969, the company is known for its cab over trucks. As of 2014, KAMAZ was the largest truck producer in Russia and the CIS, producing 43,000 trucks a year.

Kamaz trucks have won the Dakar Rally a record eighteen times, the most in the truck category by any manufacturer.

== History ==
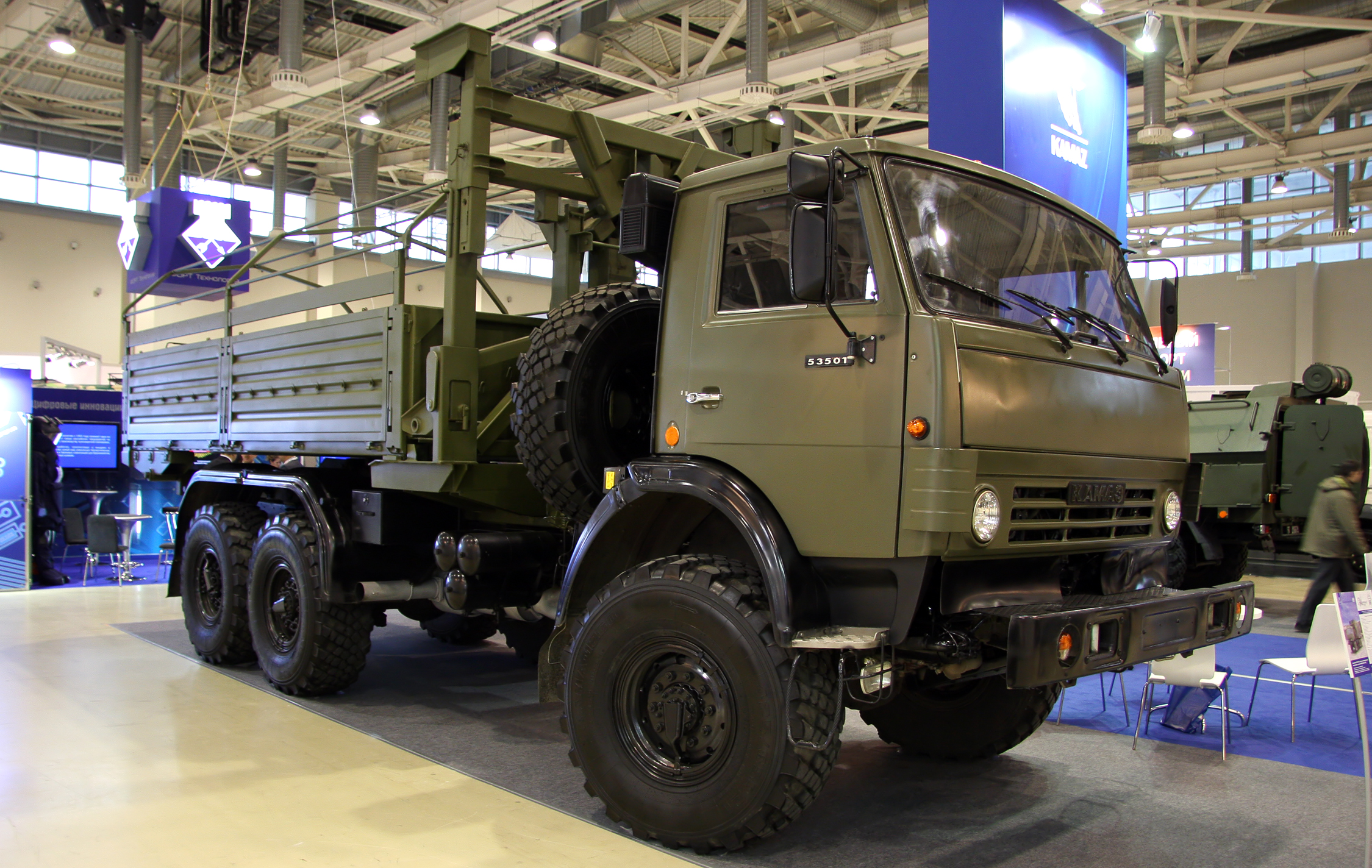
KamAZ-53501

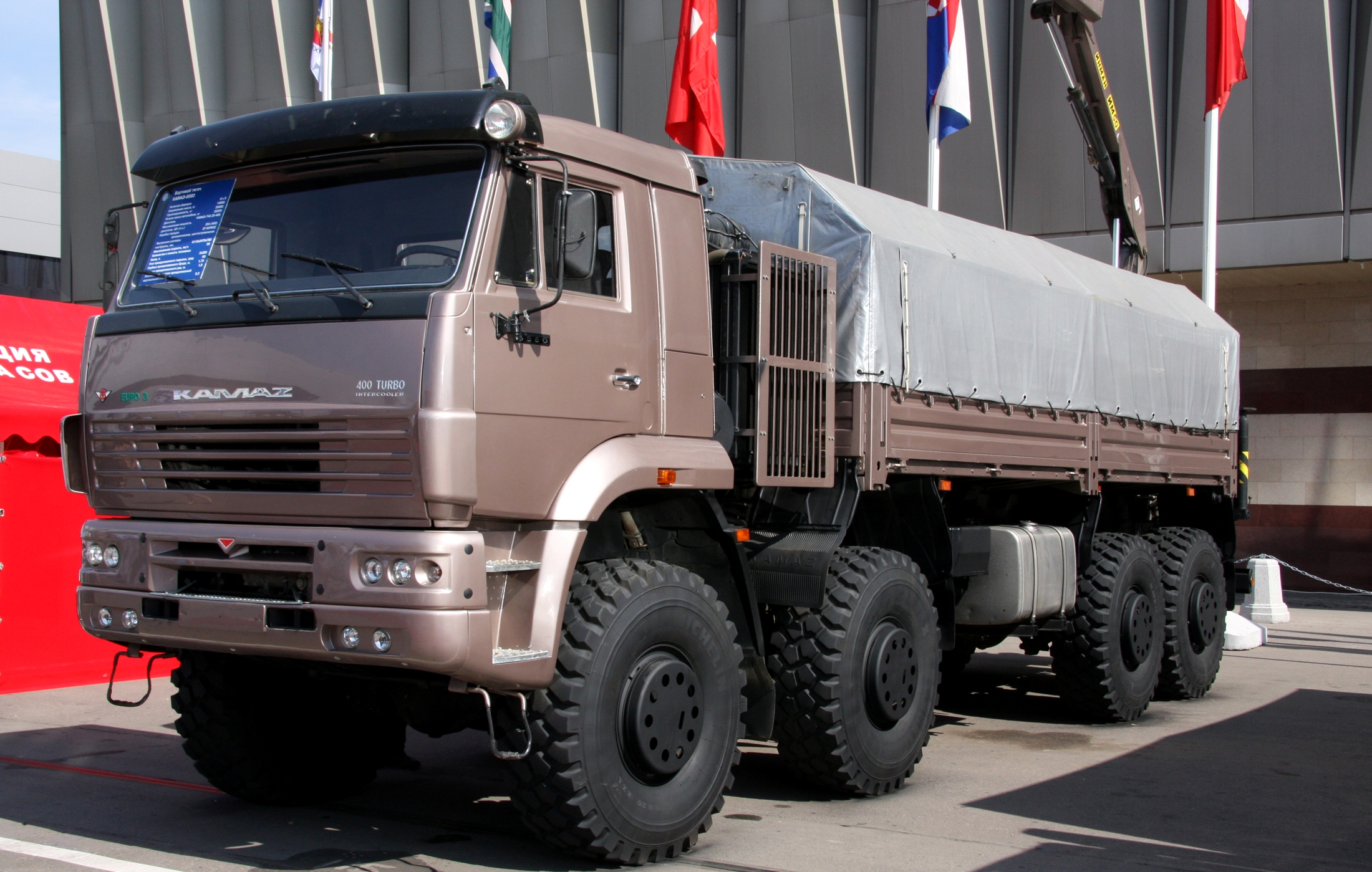
KamAZ-6560

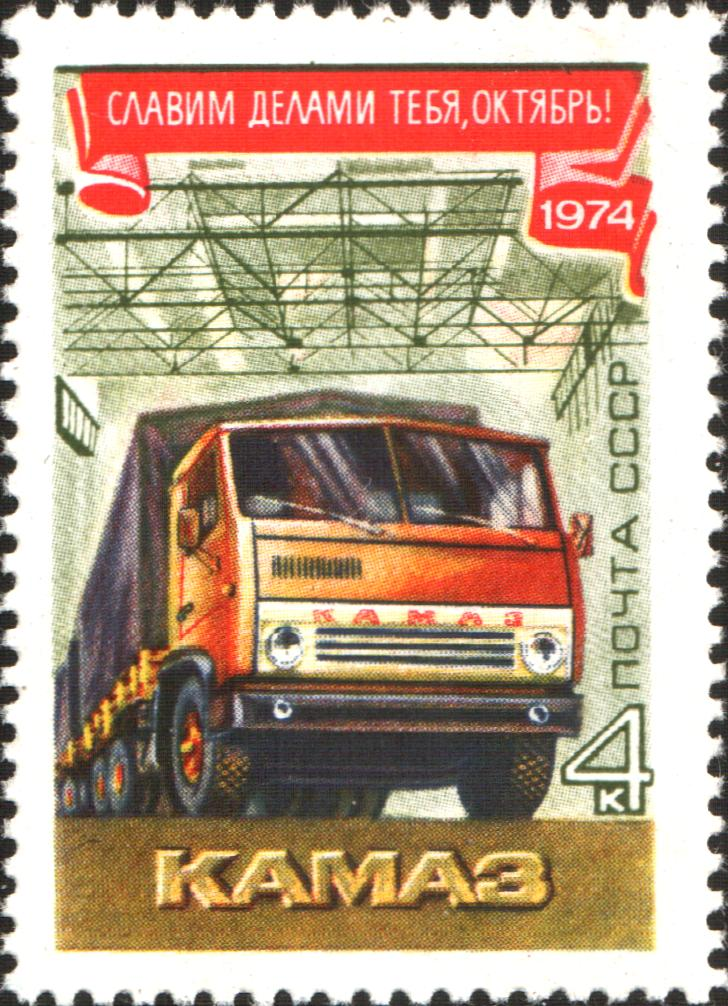
USSR 1974 postage stamp featuring a KamAZ truck

In 1969, the Resolution of the Central Committee of the Communist Party of the Soviet Union and the USSR Council of Ministers was approved which envisaged construction of a complex of heavy duty truck production plants. Out of 70 sites investigated as potential locations, Naberezhnye Chelny, then a small town on the Kama River, was chosen. Naberezhnye Chelny is located near two navigable rivers: the Kama River and the Volga River, and has railway connections. These transport links made the site attractive as they could be used to bring in raw materials and facilitate the export of the trucks. The fact that the huge construction company "KamGESenergostroy" existed in the region allowed construction of plant buildings and apartment blocks for prospective KAMAZ employees to be completed.

Workers and engineers, representing more than 70 ethnicities, converged on Naberezhnye Chelny. Over 100,000 personnel were employed at the construction site itself. In its fit-out, the plant was provided with state-of-the-art manufacturing equipment. More than 700 international firms were among equipment vendors for KAMAZ facilities, including Swindell-Dressler, Holcroft, CE-Cast, Ingersoll Rand, Ex-Cello (U.S.A.), Hueller-Hille, Liebherr (West Germany), Morando, Fiat (Italy), Renault (France), Sandvik (Sweden), JCB (U.K.), Komatsu and Hitachi (Japan).

On December 13, 1969, ground was broken and the first bucket of soil was excavated at the construction site of the Kama River Truck Plant which was rated for production of 150,000 heavy duty trucks and 250,000 engines per year. The Complex of Plants on the Kama River sprawled over 57 square km. Facilities had to be constructed for the 100,000 workers at the plant. They were provided with housing, educational facilities, kindergartens and creches, hospitals and clinics, numerous cultural, sporting and recreational centers. KAMAZ was instrumental in transforming the Kama River Area into an industrial and scientific research hub and developing the infrastructure for nearby agricultural areas.

Every year the population of the city grew by another 30-40 thousand or so. Whereas before construction of KAMAZ got underway, 27,000 residents had lived in Naberezhnye Chelny, the current population is over half a million.

In 2016, the company's revenue amounted to 121 billion rubles.

As a result of the 2022 Russian invasion of Ukraine, Kamaz is sanctioned by the EU (March 2022), by New Zealand (April 2022), and by Japan (January 2023). In July 2023, Russian Defense Minister Sergey Shoigu stated that the supplies of KAMAZ multipurpose vehicles had surged 17.6 times since early 2022. By 2025, conditions had affected profitability with the company recording significant losses. However, in the first half of 2026, losses were reduced to only 21.8 billion rubles from a 37 billion ruble loss during 2025 and a 3.4 billion loss in 2024.

== Group structure ==
=== Owners and management ===
The main shareholders of Kamaz are the state corporation Rostec (49.9%), Avtoinvest Limited (23.54%), a Cyprus-registered company, and Daimler Truck (15%). In February 2022, Daimler suspended cooperation with Kamaz due to the Russian invasion of Ukraine. The main beneficiaries of the Cyprus-based company have never been officially disclosed, however it is alleged that the company can be traced to Sergei Roldugin, a concert cellist and personal friend of Vladimir Putin based on the Panama Papers.

At the same time, a 4% stake in the company is publicly traded on the Moscow Exchange, leading the company to have many minority shareholders (more than 76,000 individuals in 2007).

In early March 2008 the Board of Directors of KAMAZ was elected, which included 15 people, including:

The mayor of the city of Naberezhnye Chelny (April 2010 - Prime Minister of Tatarstan) - Ildar Khalikov, head of the management Federal Agency for State Property Management (Rosimushchestvo) - Ivan V. Aksenov, and the Director-General of the "Russian Technologies State Corporation" Sergey Chemezov.

=== Subsidiaries ===
KAMAZ Publicly Traded Company has more than 110 subsidiaries and affiliates, it owns shares in the authorized capital of more than 50 different companies and businesses. Together they form KAMAZ Group.
The group includes:

- Truck Assembly Plant (Naberezhnye Chelny)
- Metallurgical Complex, KAMAZ PTC
  KAMAZ Foundries (now one of the largest in Russia)
  KAMAZ Forge
  KAMAZ Truck Assembly Plant
- KAMAZ Press and Stamping Plant
- Engine Plant, KAMAZ PTC
- Remdiesel
- KAMAZ Trade and Finance Company JSC
- Neftekamsk Automotive Plant (NEFAZ) - manufactures buses and vehicles on KAMAZ chassis
- Auto Trailer Plant OJSC (formerly СЗАП (En:SZAP) of Stavropol)
- KAMAZ Technical Service OJSC
- KAMAZ Auto Technology
- RIZ OJSC (formerly of KAMAZinstrumentspetsmash)
- KIP Master OJSC
- KAMAZ-FINANCE
- KAMAZ-CAPITAL KAMAZ R & D Center

The main production facilities of the plant are located in the industrial area of Naberezhnye Chelny. Nefaz buses are produced in Neftekamsk (Bashkortostan).

KAMAZ owns United Automotive Technologies, a Russian holding of auto parts manufacturers.

The company has overseas manufacturing facilities in Vietnam, India, Kazakhstan (KAMAZ-Engineering JSC). Since 2015 Ganja Auto Plant (Azerbaijan) also assembles Kamaz trucks.

In January 2022, the Hungarian Ministry for Innovation and Technology and Kamaz signed an agreement for production of electric cars in Hungary - about 32,000 by 2025 and 320,000 by 2030.

== Competition ==
The team Kamaz Master, which has been active since 1988 has participated as truck category in rally raid such as Dakar Rally, Silk Way Rally and Africa Eco Race. Kamaz vehicles have won the truck category of the Dakar Rally 19 times as of 2026.

== Engines ==
- R-6
- Cummins Kama

== See also ==
- List of Kamaz vehicles
