= Moskvitch =

Soviet and Russian automobile brand

JSC Moscow Automobile Plant Moskvitch
- Logo since 2022

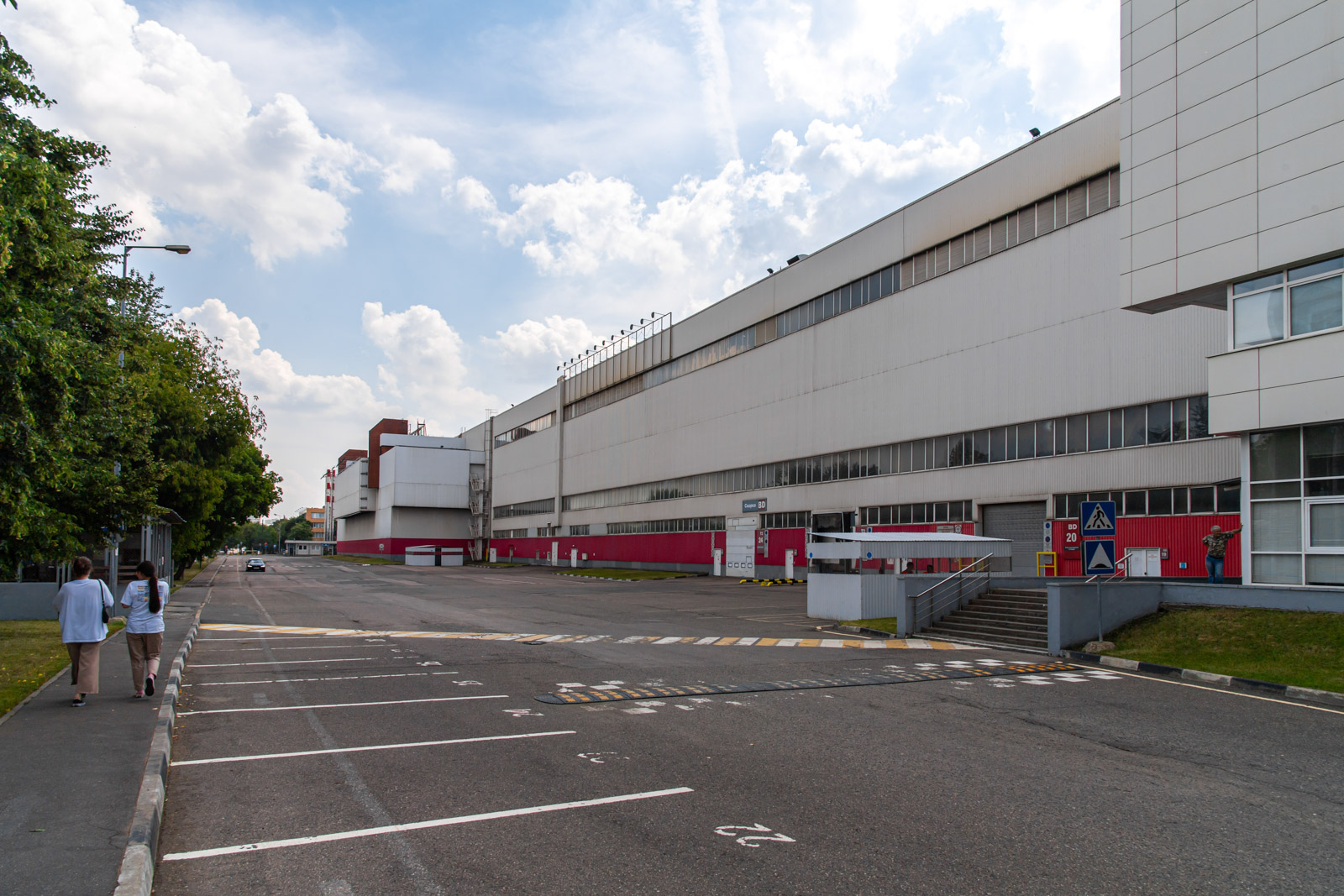
- Moscow Automotive Plant Moskvitch
- Native name: АО «Московский автомобильный завод «Москвич»
- Industry: Automotive
- Predecessor: KIM (1930–1945); ZMA/MZMA (1945–1968); AZLK (1968–1993); OAO Moskvitch (1993–1998); Avtoframos (1998–2014); Renault Russia (2014–2022)
- Founded: 6 November 1930
- Headquarters: Moscow, Russia
- Area served: Russia; Mongolia
- Key people: Elena Alexandrovna Frolova (general manager); Dmitry Valentinovich Pronin (chairperson)
- Products: Cars; SUVs; pickup trucks; sports vehicles; vans
- Revenue: 530,700,000,000 Russian ruble (1994)
- Owner: Government of Moscow
- Number of employees: 4,378
- Website: moskvich-auto.ru

Moskvitch or Moskvich (Russian: Москвич) (also written as Moskvich, Moskvič, or Moskwitsch) is a Soviet/Russian automobile brand produced by AZLK from 1946 to 1991 and by OAO Moskvitch from 1991 to 2001. Production resumed in 2022.

OAO Moskvitch is the name of a privatized venture given to the former factory to avoid legal issues after the dissolution of the Soviet Union in 1991. Since the factory had no assembly branches outside Russia after 1991, its name is largely used today to refer to the building located in the lower eastern part of Moscow.

The word moskvich itself translates as "a native of Moscow; Muscovite".

== History ==
=== Early history ===
The Soviet Union initiated a series of five-year plans in 1928 under the rule of Joseph Stalin, aimed to rapidly industrialise the economy. Plans included provisions for developing domestic automobile production.

Industrial cooperation between Russia and the American Ford Motor Company (founded in 1903) dated back to the era of Russian emperor Nicholas II (r. 1894–1917), with the U.S. company being an important supplier of passenger and commercial vehicles such as tractors and trucks. This cooperation persisted despite the events of the October Revolution of November 1917, with tens of thousands of vehicles imported during the 1910s and 1920s. The Bolshevik government of Soviet Russia deemed importing necessary due to the devastation of the state and of its economic output following the Great War of 1914–1918, the Central Powers' occupation of Russian territories after 1918's Operation Faustschlag, and the Russian Civil War of 1917–1922.

The construction of the Moscow Car Assembly Factory (Russian: Московский автосборочный завод) began in 1929. In December 1930, the plant received the name KIM Russian: КИМ (Завод имени Коммунистического Интернационала Молодёжи) ("factory named after the Young Communist International organization"); from 1930 to 1939, its official name was Moscow Car Assembly Factory named after KIM (Russian: Московский автосборочный завод имени КИМ); and from 1939 until the beginning of the Great Patriotic War of 1941–1945, it was called the Moscow Car Factory named after KIM (Russian: Московский автомобильный завод имени КИМ).

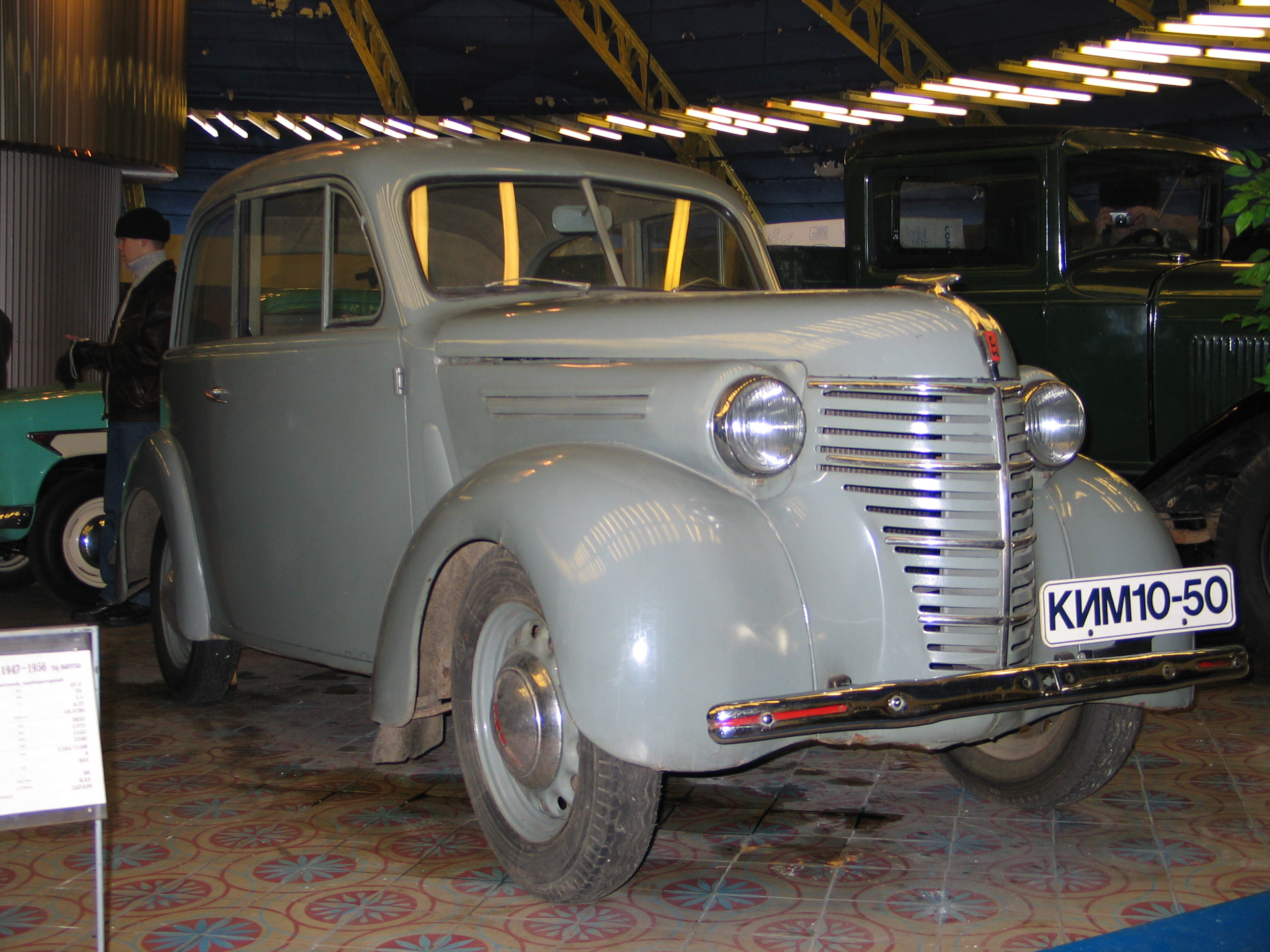
KIM-10-50

In 1930, licensed production of the Ford Model A and Model AA vehicles using knock-down kits began. In 1933, the plant became a branch of GAZ and began to assemble GAZ-A and GAZ-AA vehicles. In 1939, KIM was no longer a subsidiary of GAZ, and the following year, the company began producing its own model, the KIM-10, inspired by the Ford Prefect. The plant's newly formed design department was headed by A. N. Ostrovtsev, an engineer from the NAMI, and tasked by the Sovnarkom with designing a small car suitable for large-scale manufacture. From November 1940 to April 1941, 338 sedans were assembled.

=== Great Patriotic War ===
In May 1941, the Red Army subjected a KIM-10 to a series of tests, including in road conditions varying from the newly built Moscow-Minsk Highway to rural mud roads and off-road. The car proved to be unsuited to the requirements of military service.

In October, the plant was hastily evacuated to the Ural Mountains. Most of the manufacturing equipment was abandoned or destroyed during the Battle of Moscow.

In 1944, with a Soviet victory imminent, plans were in place to continue production of the KIM-10-52.

=== First generation ===
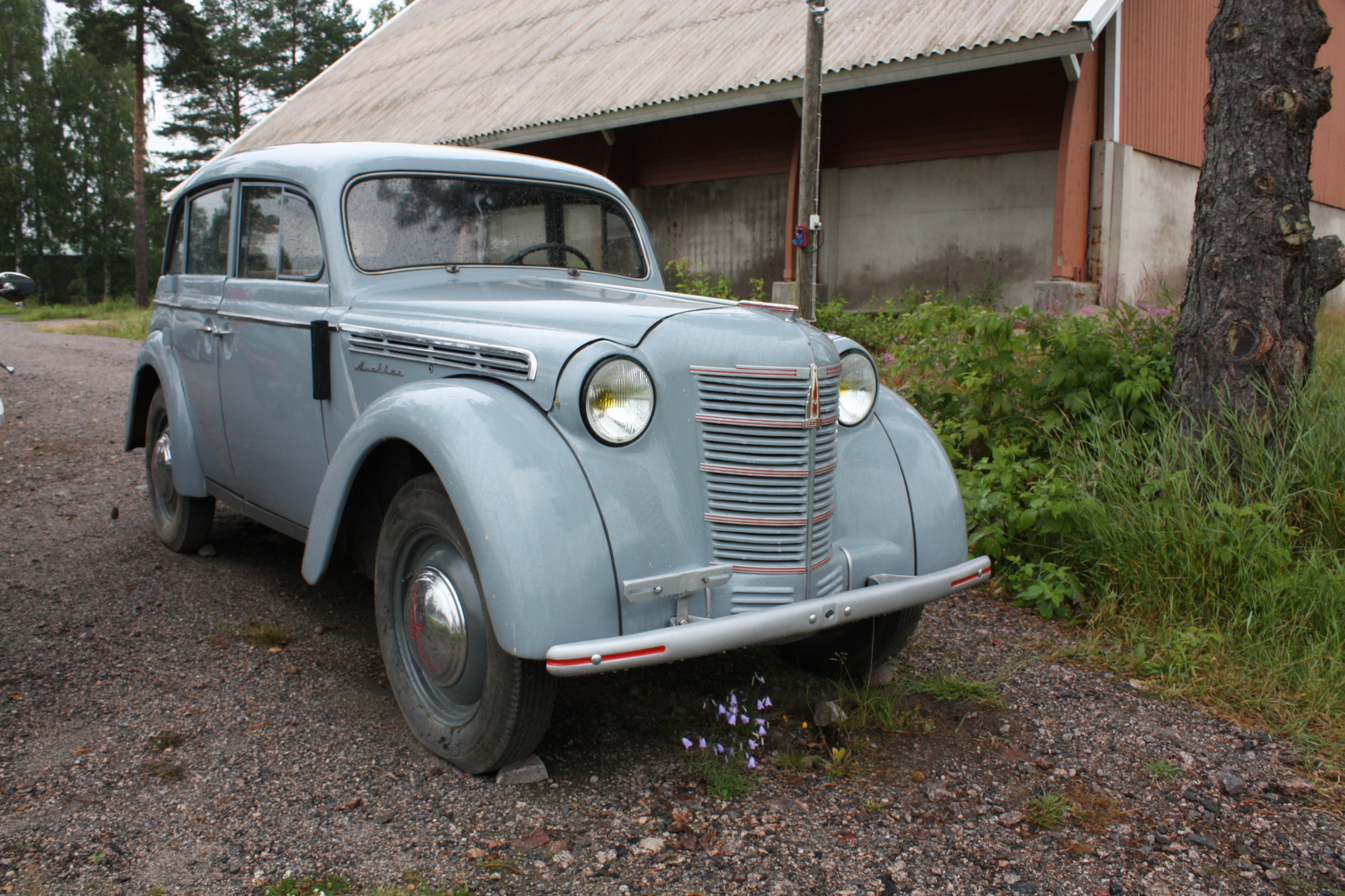
Moskvitch 401

In August 1945, the plant was renamed to Moscow Plant of Small Cars (MZMA) (Russian: Московский Завод Малолитражных Автомобилей). Following the war, the Soviet Union requested vehicle tooling and designs from Germany as part of war reparations, to compensate for the loss of industrial equipment in the Battle of Moscow. Soviet planners wished for a car similar in specifications to the KIM 10, and as such, rejected the Kdf-Wagen and DKW F8. The Opel Kadett K38 was found to match requirements, however. That month, the State Defense Committee published Order No. 9905, which ordered the start of production of the Kadett, under the Moskvitch-400 name. The implementation of this order was severely complicated, however. The Opelwerk Brandenburg plant had been deeply involved in the Nazi German war effort, producing aircraft engines for the Luftwaffe, and it had been heavily damaged by Allied bombing. However, a number of Kadetts had been captured by the Red Army and were available for study, through joint Soviet-German ventures overseen by the Soviet Military Administration in Germany. Nonetheless, the majority of stamping dies and tooling were freshly produced in the Soviet Union due to the amount of damage to the factory. Production of the Moskvitch 400-420 began in December 1946 and continued for ten years until 1956, with the improved Moskvitch 401. In total, 247,439 400 and 401 models were built, with some being exported to countries such as Belgium, East Germany, and Norway.

=== Second generation ===
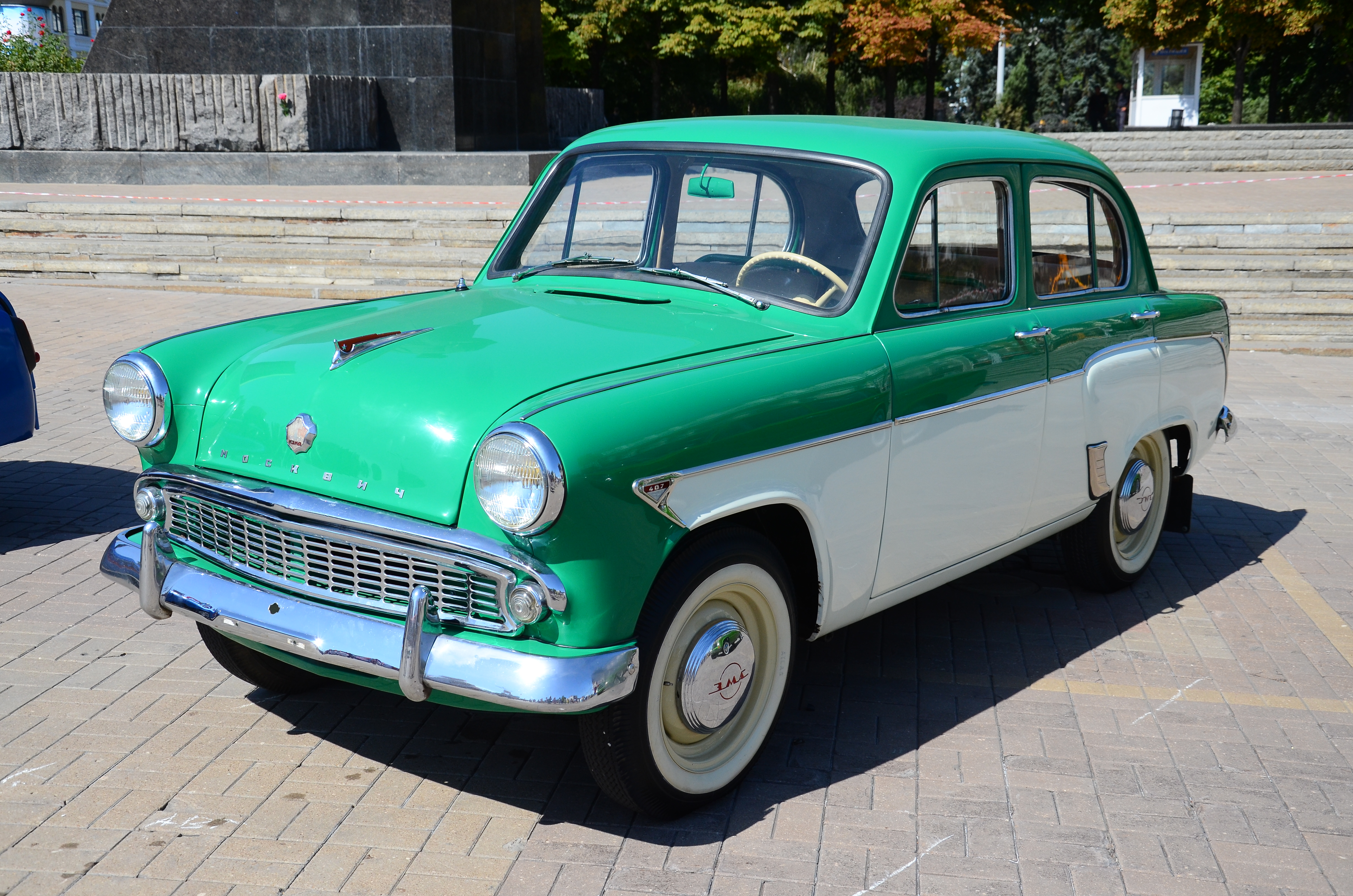
Moskvitch 407

MZMA replaced the 400 and 401 with new designs developed within the Soviet Union, starting in 1956. This marked the second generation of production vehicles for the enterprise, first with the Moskvitch 402 and followed by upgraded variants in the form of the Moskvitch 403 and Moskvitch 407, which featured improvements such as independent suspensions, improved interiors, and built-in radios, comparable to models such as the Hillman Minx, Fiat 1100, and Ford Consul. While the Moskvitch 407 provided greater driving comfort at a higher cost, other trim levels included the Moskvitch 407-424 station wagon, available to the general public, the Moskvitch 431 van, and the Moskvitch 410/411 attempt at creating an early off-road sedan/station wagon. The M-407 was the first Soviet automotive export to be truly successful in the West. Up to half of all Moskvitch 407 production was reserved for export, mainly to Eastern Bloc countries, Norway, Finland, and France.

=== Third generation ===
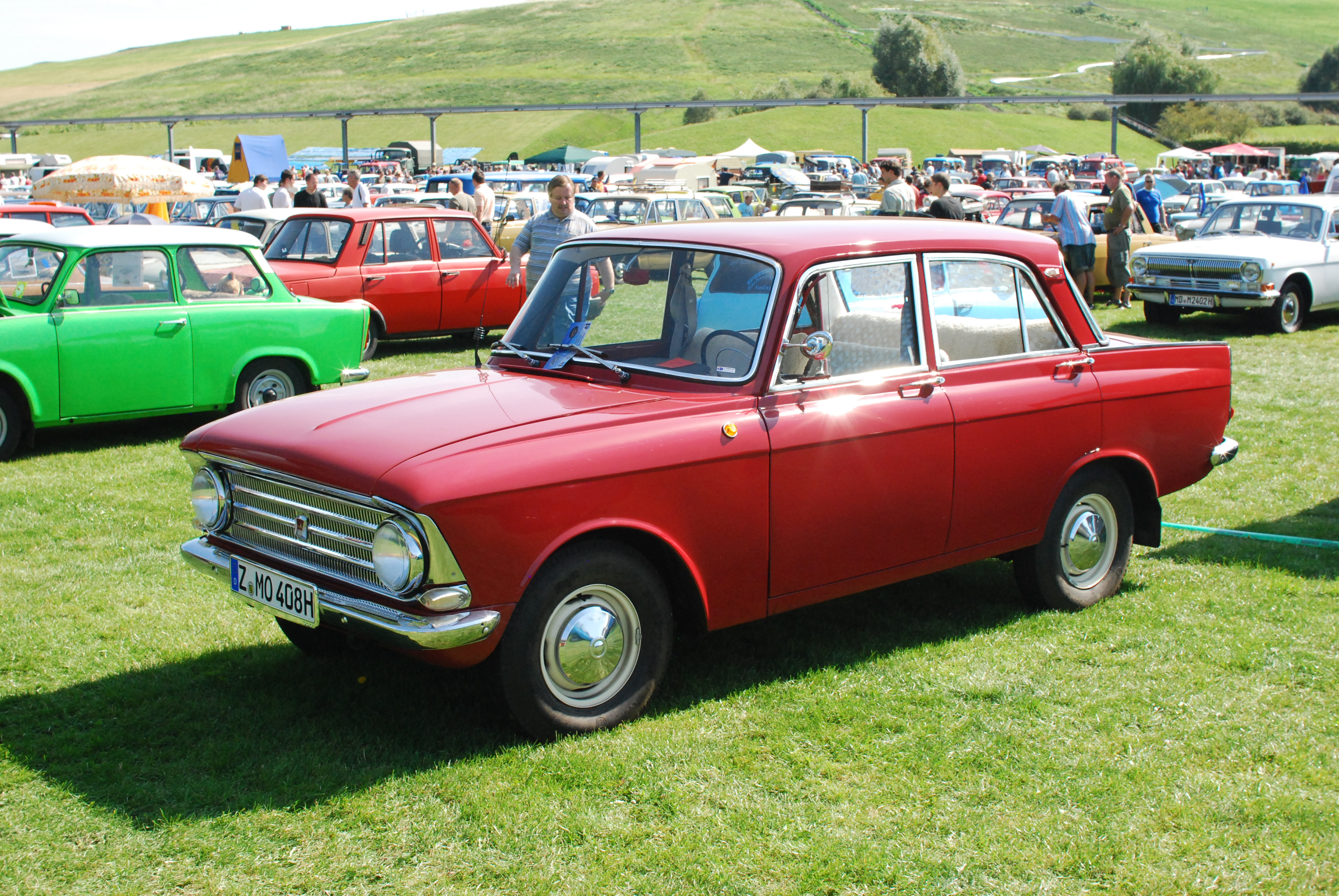
Moskvitch 408

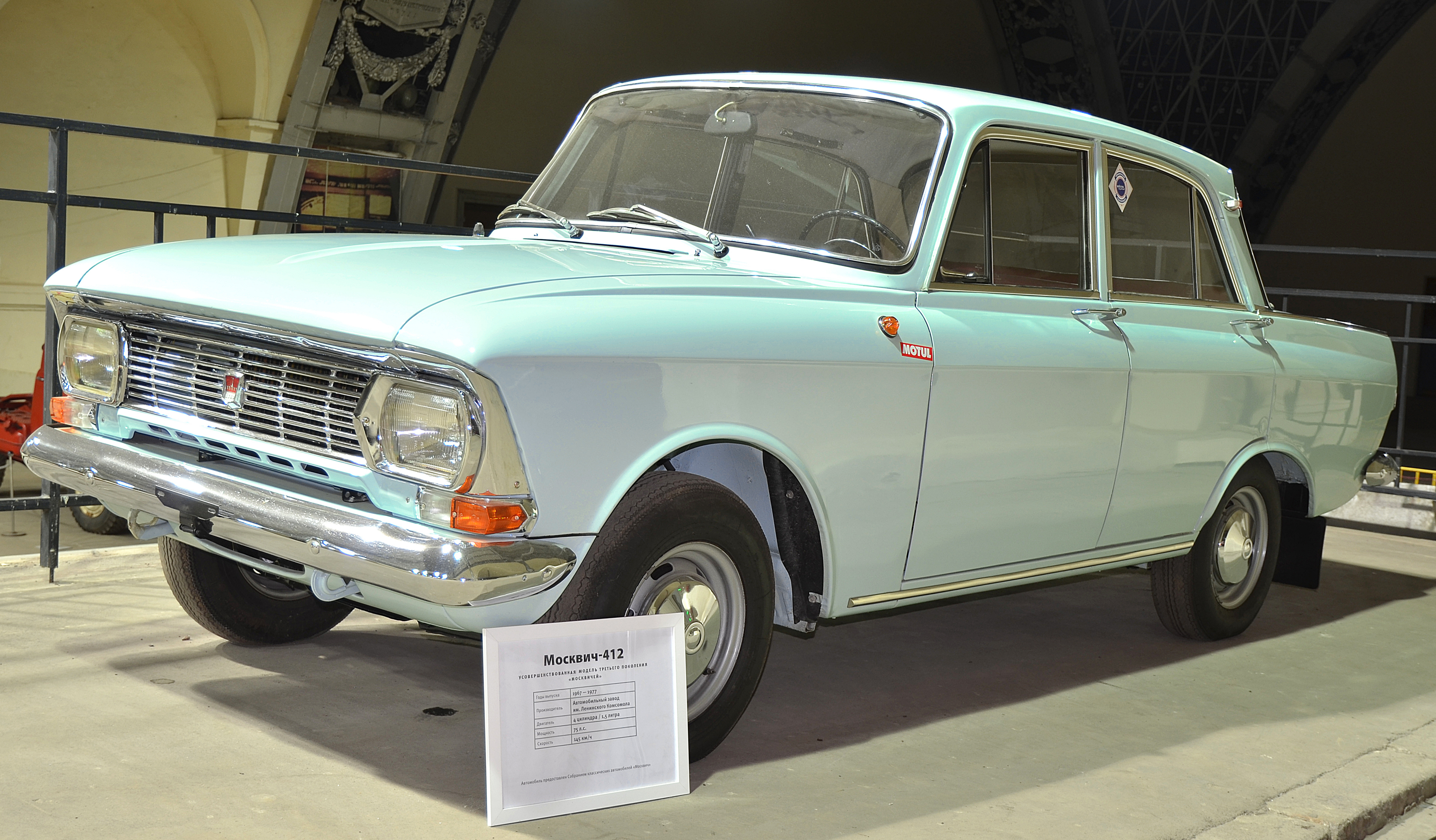
Moskvitch 412

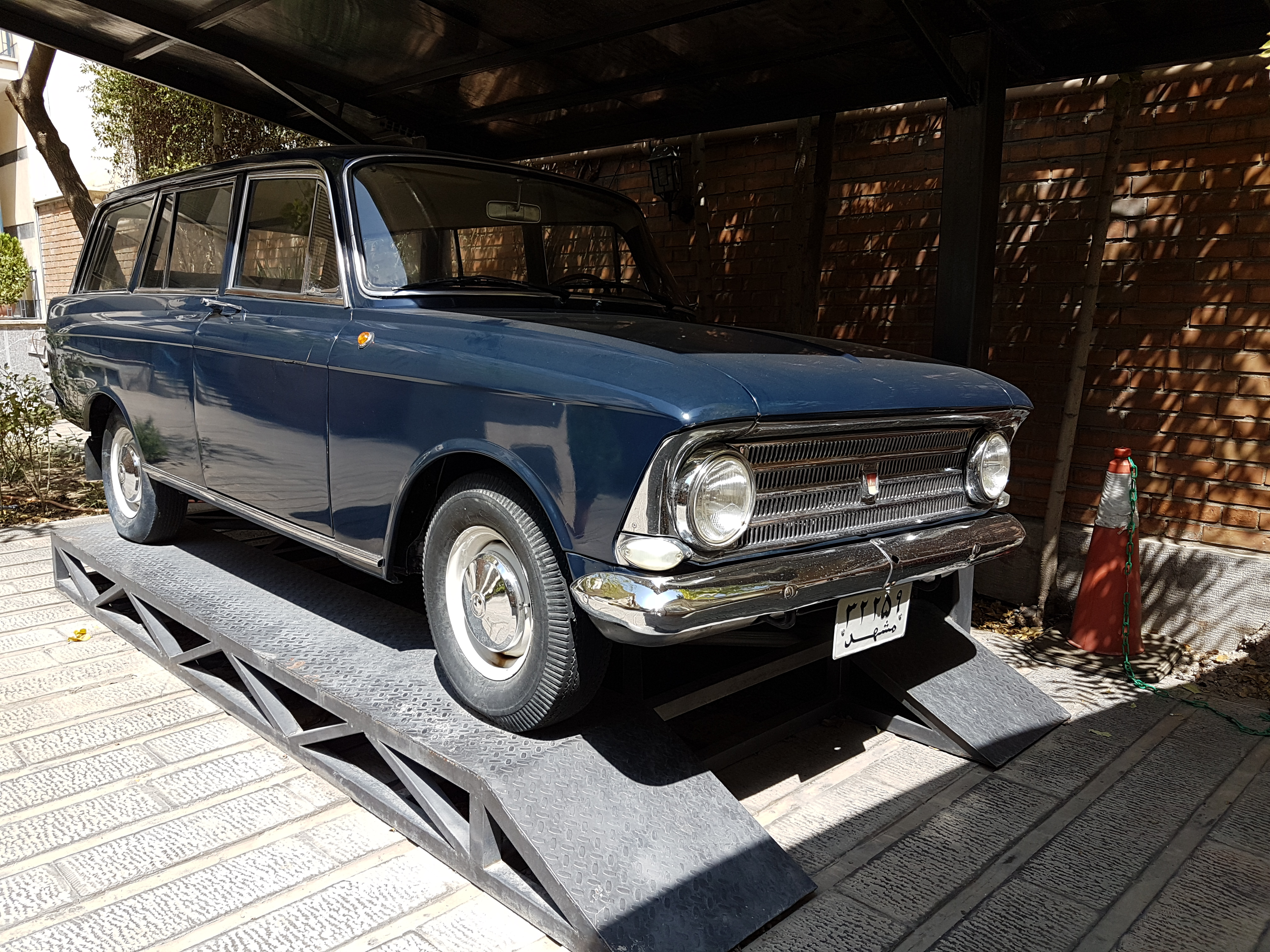
Moskvitch 426, a wagon based on the Moskvitch 408

The 1960s bought about a third generation of cars, with the more advanced Moskvitch 408, Moskvitch 412, and Moskvitch 2140. The Moskvitch 408 was the first Soviet-built car to be designed with extra safety features in mind, including crumple zones, safer steering columns, soft interior parts, seat belts, a padded dashboard, and a split-circuit braking system. The first series of Moskvitch 408 cars had vertical rear lights, two or four round headlights, a front bench seat, and a 4-speed manual transmission with a column-mounted gear lever. The second-generation 408 was produced between 1969 and 1976. It had the same engine and transmission as its predecessor, but an updated body fitted with rectangular headlights and horizontal rear lights, with triangular turn signal markers mounted on tailfins. It additionally included separated bucket seats, and the transmission used a floor-mounted gear lever. The 408 was popular due to its good value in countries such as the United Kingdom, Finland, and Norway. The Moskvitch 412 added various engine and styling improvements.

In 1966, during a visit by French President Charles de Gaulle to the Soviet Union, an agreement was signed between MZMA and Renault. The French automaker would assist in the reconstruction of the plant in Moscow and collaborate in the establishment of a second plant in Izhevsk.

In 1969, both the 412 and the 408 had their bodies redesigned. They were notable for being the first Moskvitch models to feature rectangular headlights and horizontal rear lights. Safety improvements were also incorporated over time, with the 412 meeting the safety standards adopted by the UNECE, receiving an international safety certificate as a result of almost five months of tests in France. The 412 was the first Moskvitch vehicle to pass safety-feature tests in France, Bulgaria, Czechoslovakia, Sweden, and West Germany. Further improvements were also made in the form of the Moskvitch 2138 and Moskvitch 2140, based on a modified Moskvitch 412 platform

In October 1968, the name of the manufacturing factory was changed from MZMA to Automobile Factory in Honour of the Leninist Communist Youth Union (AZLK) (Russian: Автомобильный Завод имени Ленинского Комсомола), to mark the 50th anniversary of the Komsomol.

=== Fourth generation ===
In 1986, the Moskvitch-2141 Aleko, influenced by the Chrysler Simca 1307, became available. It was different from any model the factory had made previously: it was larger and more luxurious, made with safety and aerodynamics in mind. It had such features as front-wheel drive, a hatchback body style, MacPherson strut front suspension, and torsion-crank rear suspension. It had rack-and-pinion steering and a collapsible steering column. In the early 1990s, AZLK still remained one of the largest auto companies in the USSR. Design and experimental work were prepared to create a new car model, the M-2142, as well as an engine plant. However, due to a financial crisis following the dissolution of the Soviet Union, combined with work disruptions and financial mismanagement, the engine plant was not finished, and the Moskvitch fell into decline.

=== OAO Moskvitch ===
The factory, which had been renamed OAO Moskvitch in the early 1990s, filed for bankruptcy in 2002 and ceased production. Unfinished bodyshells stayed on the production line in various stages of completion, while furniture, computers, office supplies, and documents remained in the plant's administration building. Several attempts to restart production were made over the next three years, but none were successful. A portion of the abandoned plant was acquired by Avtoframos, a joint venture between the City of Moscow and French automaker Renault. In 2005, Avtoframos commenced assembly of Renault Logan sedans from imported knock-down kits. It later became a wholly owned subsidiary of Renault. The bankruptcy of OAO Moskvitch was officially announced in 2006, and the company was liquidated the following year. The industrial park Technopolis Moscow opened on the premises in 2012.

In 2015, Renault announced that they had begun the process of obtaining rights to the Moskvitch in Russia.

=== JSC Automobile Plant Moskvitch ===
In May 2022, as a result of international sanctions against Russia, Renault sold its Moscow plant to the city government, which intended to nationalize the facility for renewed production of vehicles under the Moskvitch name.

Moskvitch presented its new range of models on 6 July 2022: a sedan and 3 SUVs, with the Model I coming in both a fuel version as well as an electric one. All models are rebadged versions of Chinese JAC vehicles.

On 20 October, the mayor of Moscow, Sergey Sobyanin, stated that production of Moskvich vehicles will resume in December at Renault's former factory in Moscow, now renamed the Moscow Automobile Factory Moskvich, which had been inactive since Renault had left the Russian market.

On 26 December, the Moskvitch 3 and Moskvitch 3e went on sale in Russia, with the JAC JS4-based cars produced in association with the truck manufacturer Kamaz.

In early 2023, Moskvitch and Yandex Taxi signed an agreement of intent to supply 3,000 Moskvitch 3 and 2,000 Moskvitch 3e taxi and car share vehicles. This was followed by the introduction of Moskvitch 3 vehicles for the car services Citydrive, BelkaCar, Taxovichkof, and Citymobil. Furthermore, traffic police in Moscow Oblast and Stavropol Krai began to be equipped with Moskvitch 3e electric crossovers. Furthermore, delivery was in progress for traffic police in Moscow City, Krasnodar, and Krasnoyarsk.

In June, Hans Peter Moser was appointed general manager of Moskvitch, replacing Dmitry Valentinovich Pronin, who became chair of the board of directors. Moser had previously worked for the Russian truck manufacturer Kamaz as well as the German industrial firm Knorr-Bremse. In addition, Moskvitch announced an expansion of their dealer network to more cities across Russia as well as the impending release of a new Moskvitch 6 model later in 2023, along with the Moskvitch 5.

In November 2025, Elena Aleksandrovna Frolova replaced Hans Peter Moser as general director of the company.

== Models ==
=== Current models ===
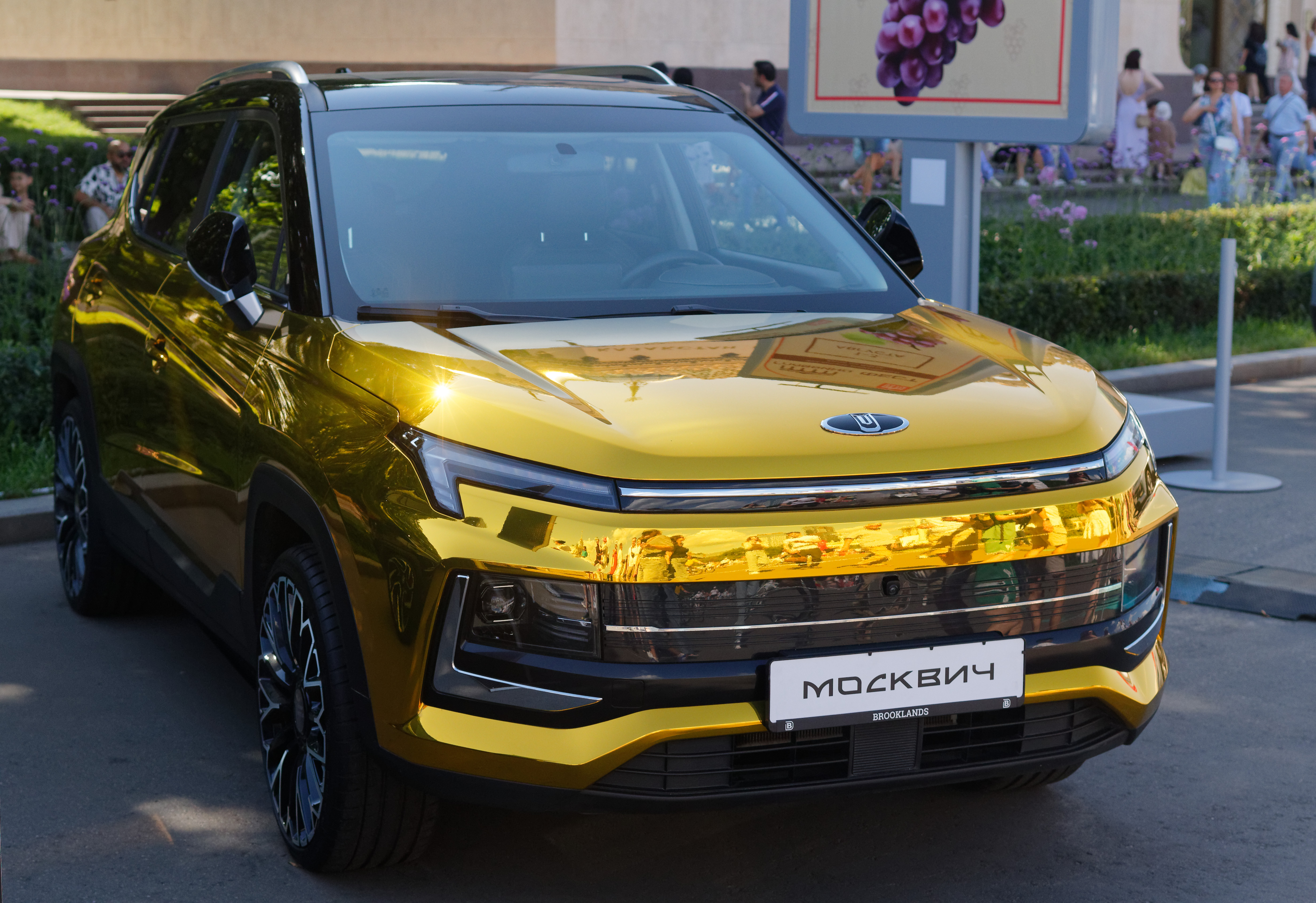
Moskvitch 3

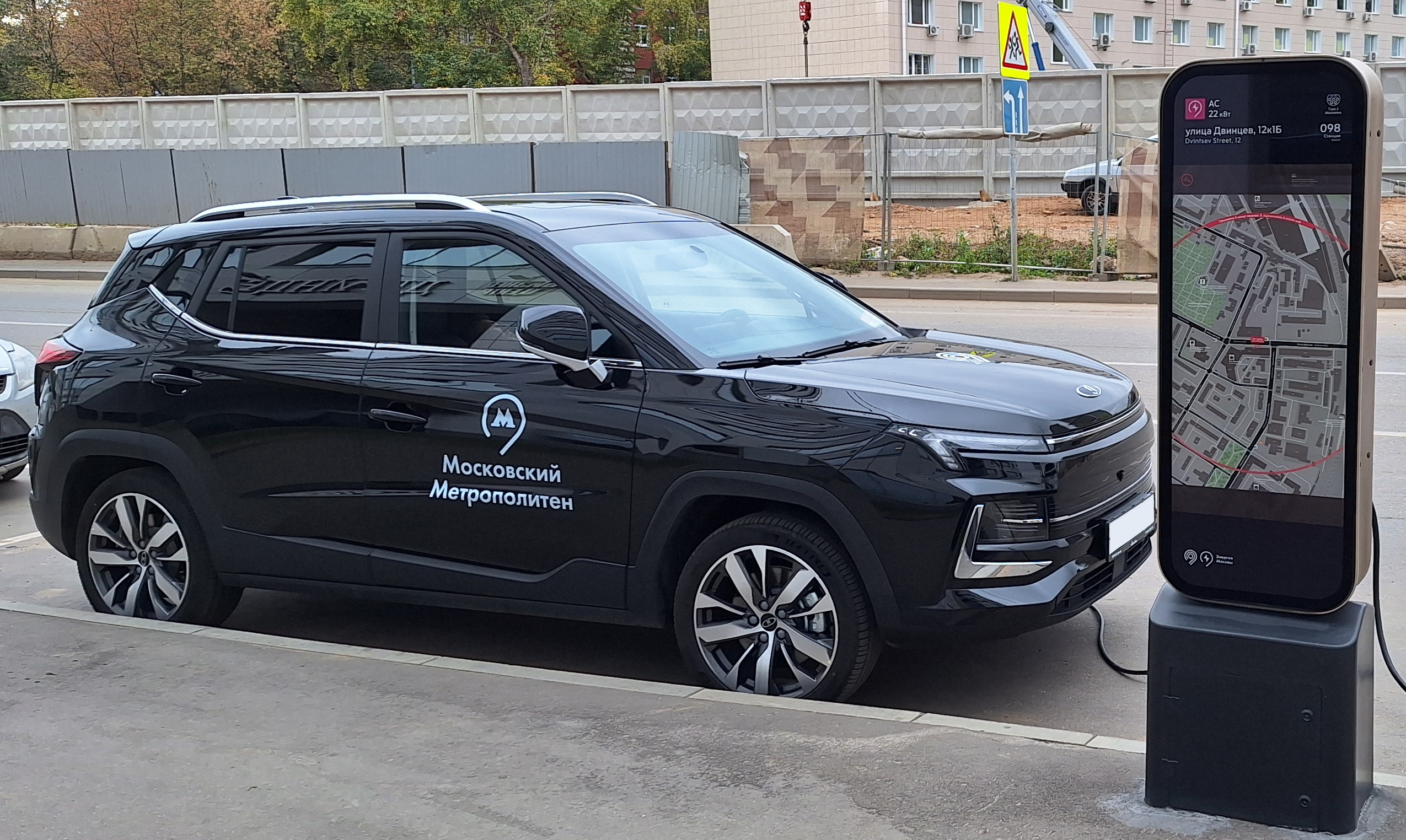
Moskvitch 3e

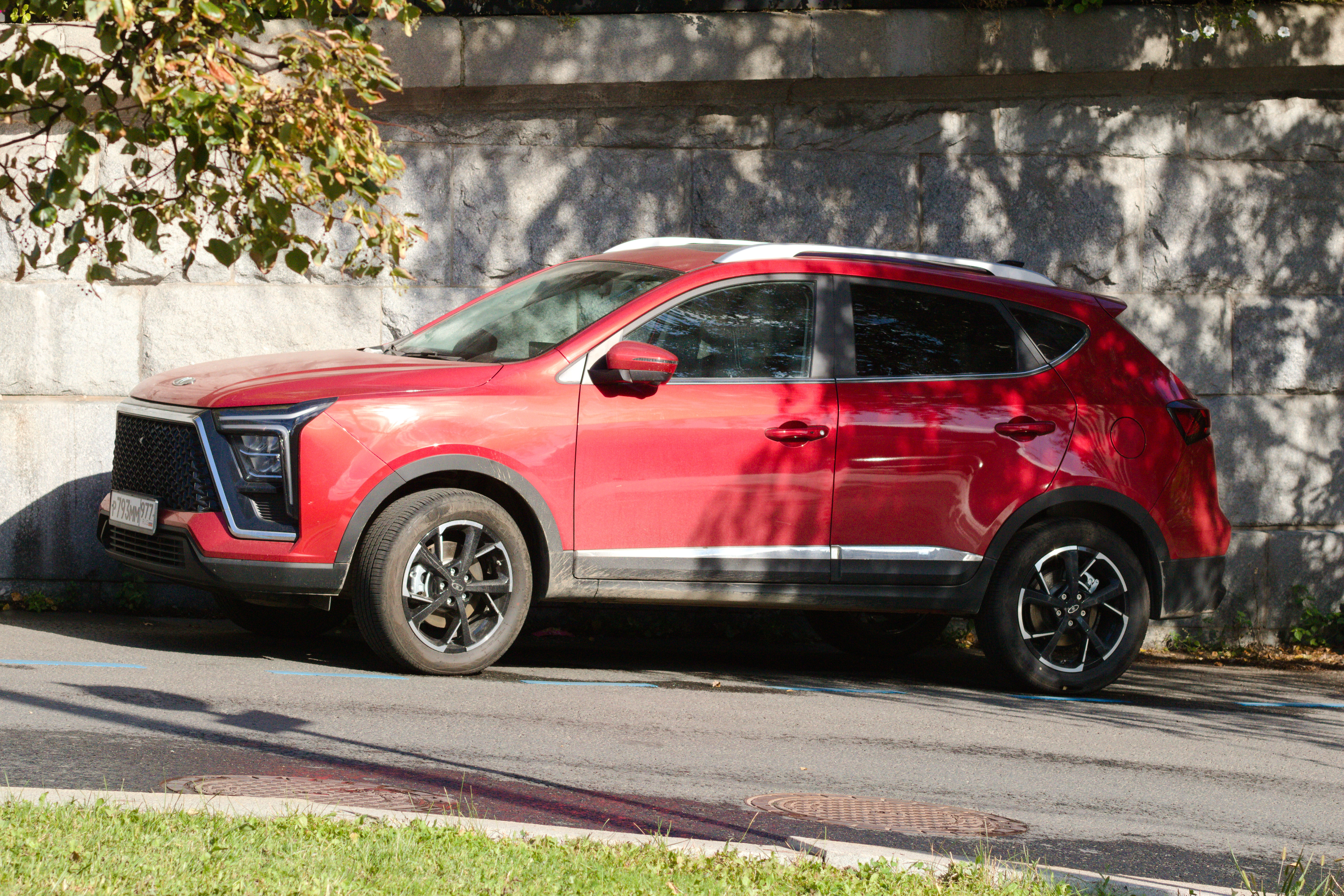
Moskvitch 5

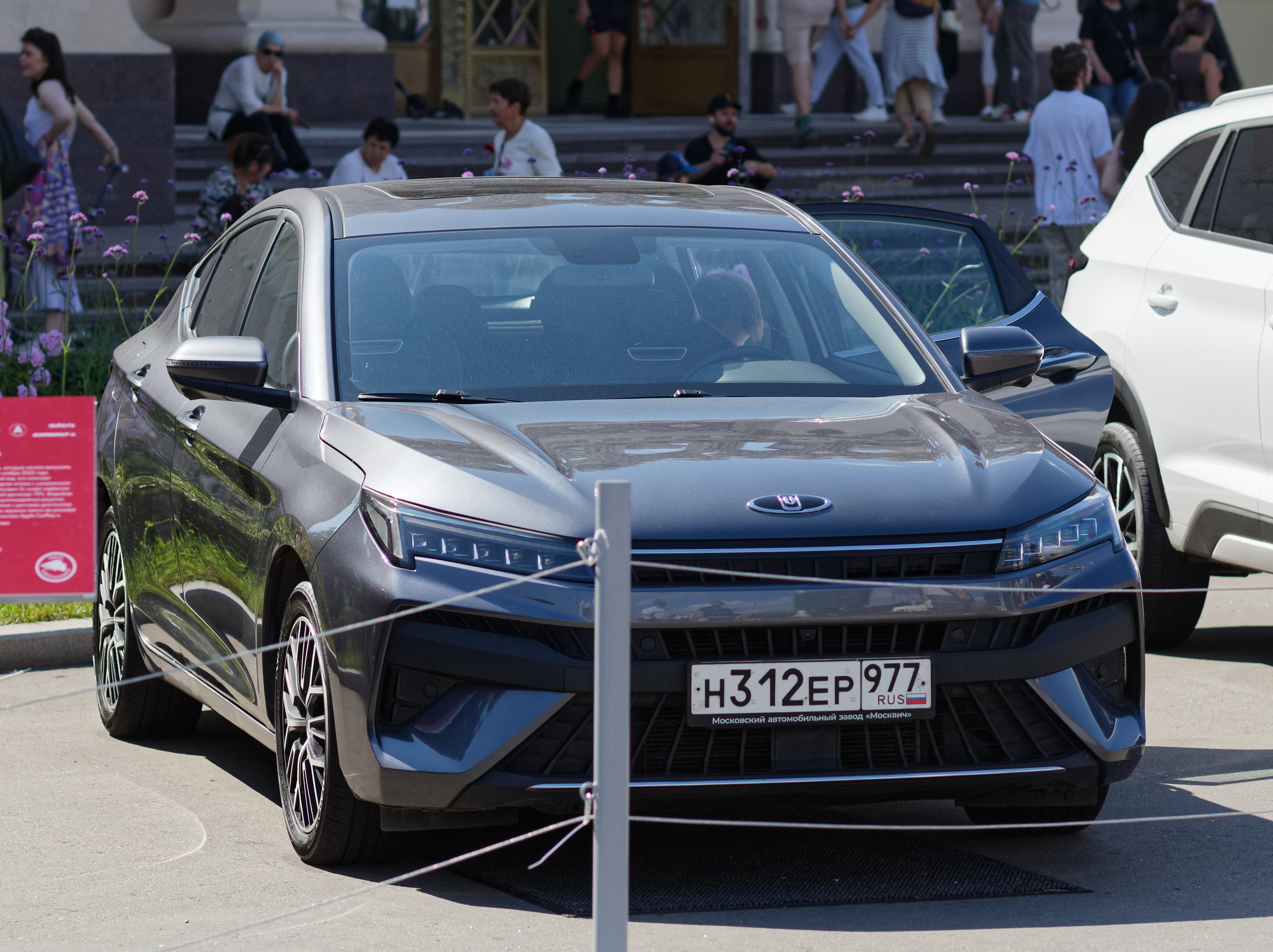
Moskvitch 6

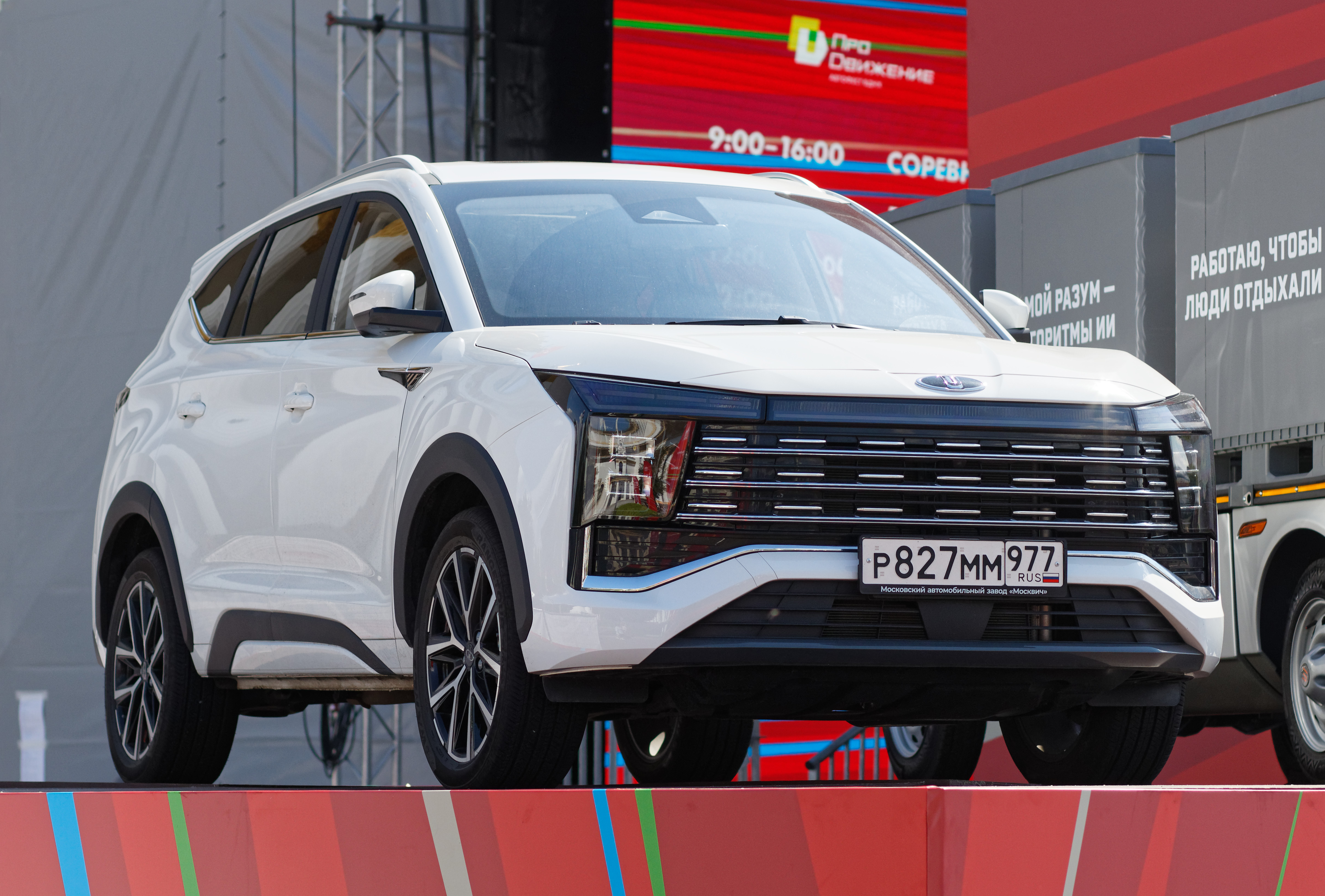
Moskvitch 8

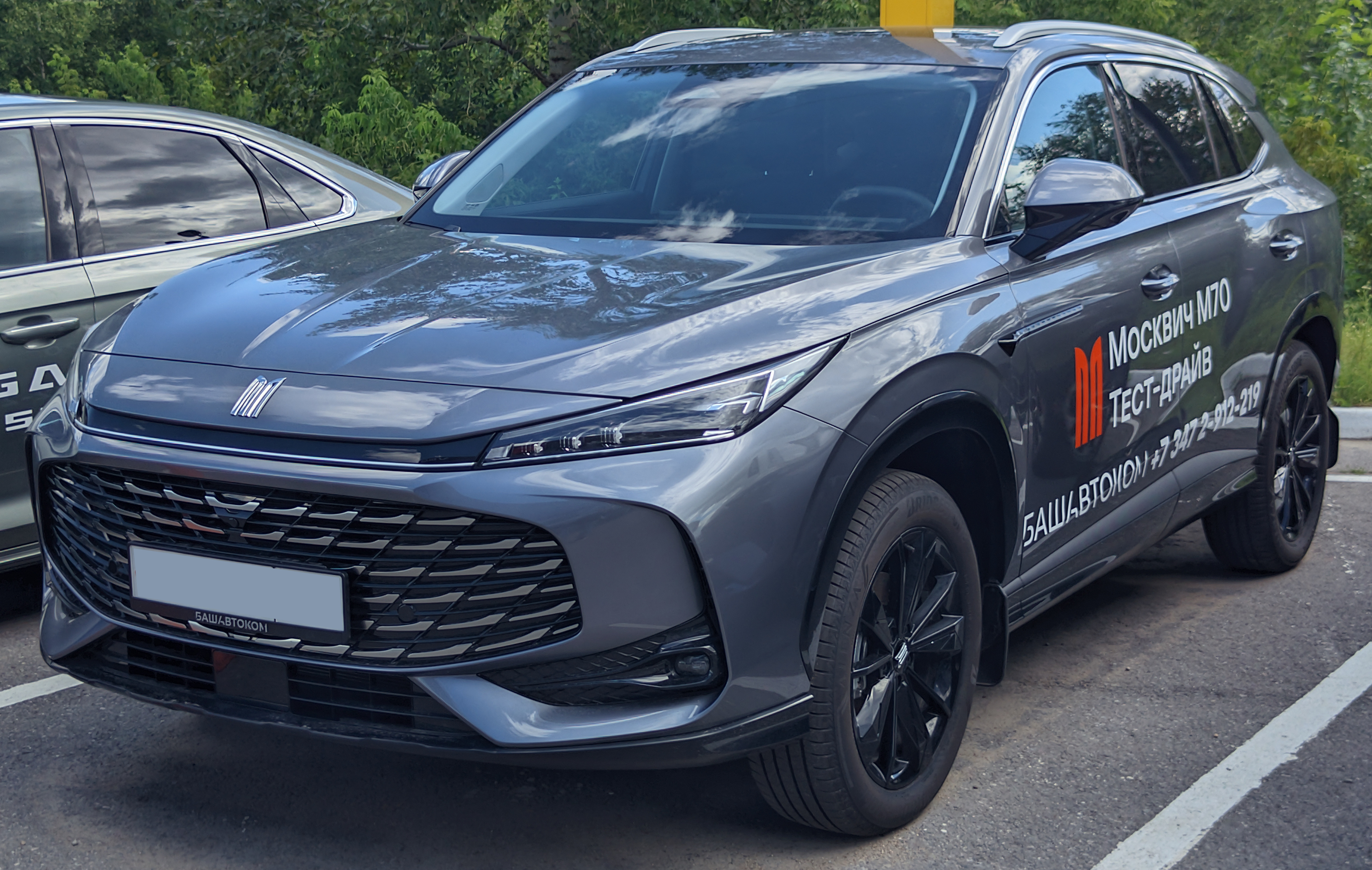
Moskvitch M70

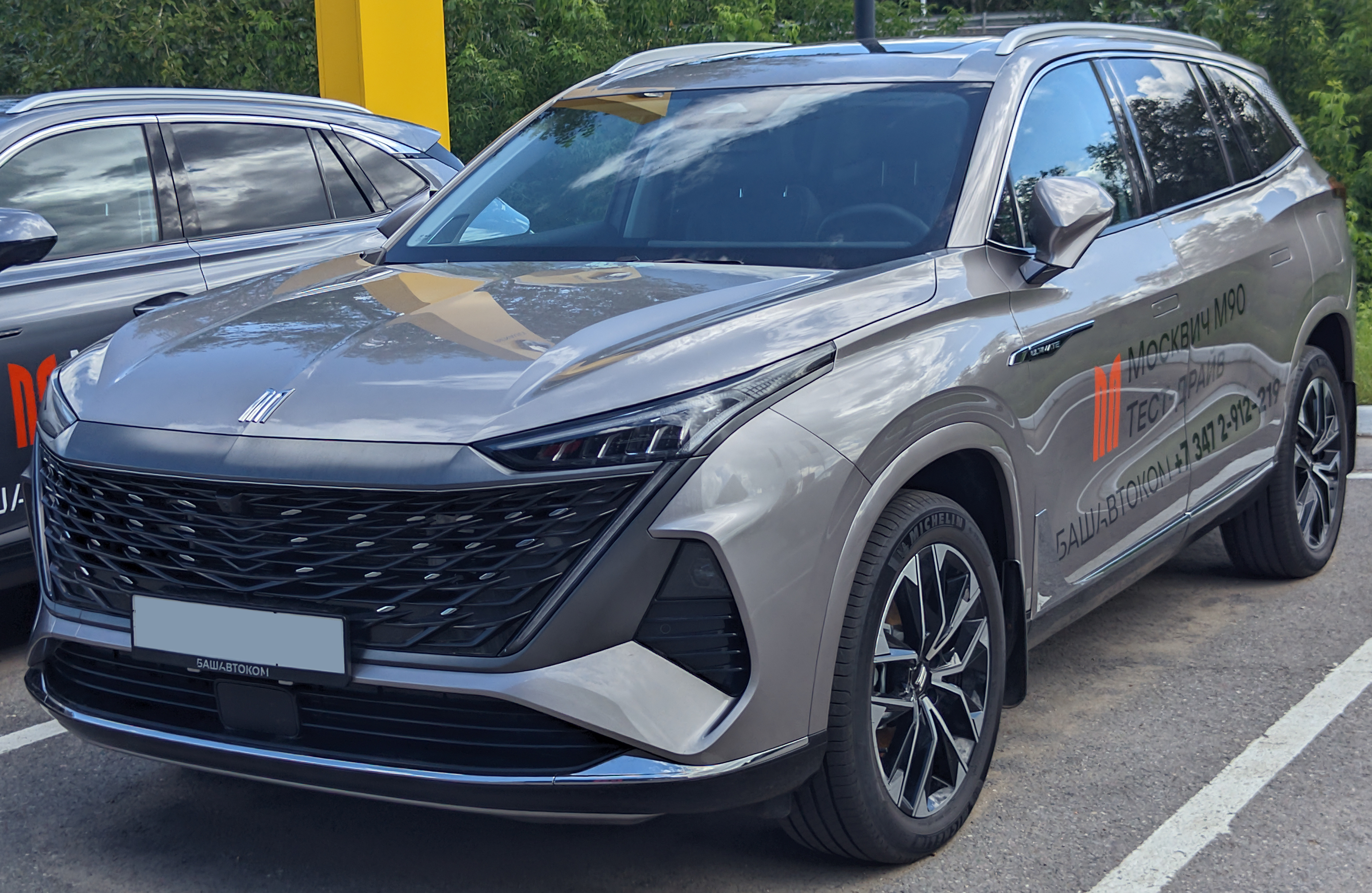
Moskvitch M90

The current model lines of Moskvitch cars are:

- Moskvitch 3 (2022–present) – five-door compact crossover. Model I.
  - Moskvitch 3e (2022–present) – five-door compact battery electric crossover. Model I (Electric).
  - Moskvitch 3 Comfort (2023–present) – five-door compact crossover with extra safety, styling, and interior features. Model I.
- Moskvitch 5 (2023–2026) – five-door compact crossover. Model II.
- Moskvitch 6 (2023–present) – five-door compact liftback. Model III.
- Moskvitch 8 (2024–present) – seven-seat crossover
- Moskvich M70 (2026, upcoming) – compact crossover SUV, five- or seven-seater
- Moskvich M90 (2026, upcoming) – mid-size crossover SUV, seven-seater

=== Licensed production ===
==== Belgium ====
The Moskvitch 408 was manufactured in Belgium under the Scaldia name. In 1965, this name was changed to Scaldia-Volga. These vehicles were imported partially built from the Soviet Union, with their engines and transmission installed after arrival in Belgium. Some of them were equipped with British-origin Perkins diesel engines. The Moskvitch 2141 Aleko was also assembled by Scaldia-Volga for a short period of time.

==== Bulgaria ====
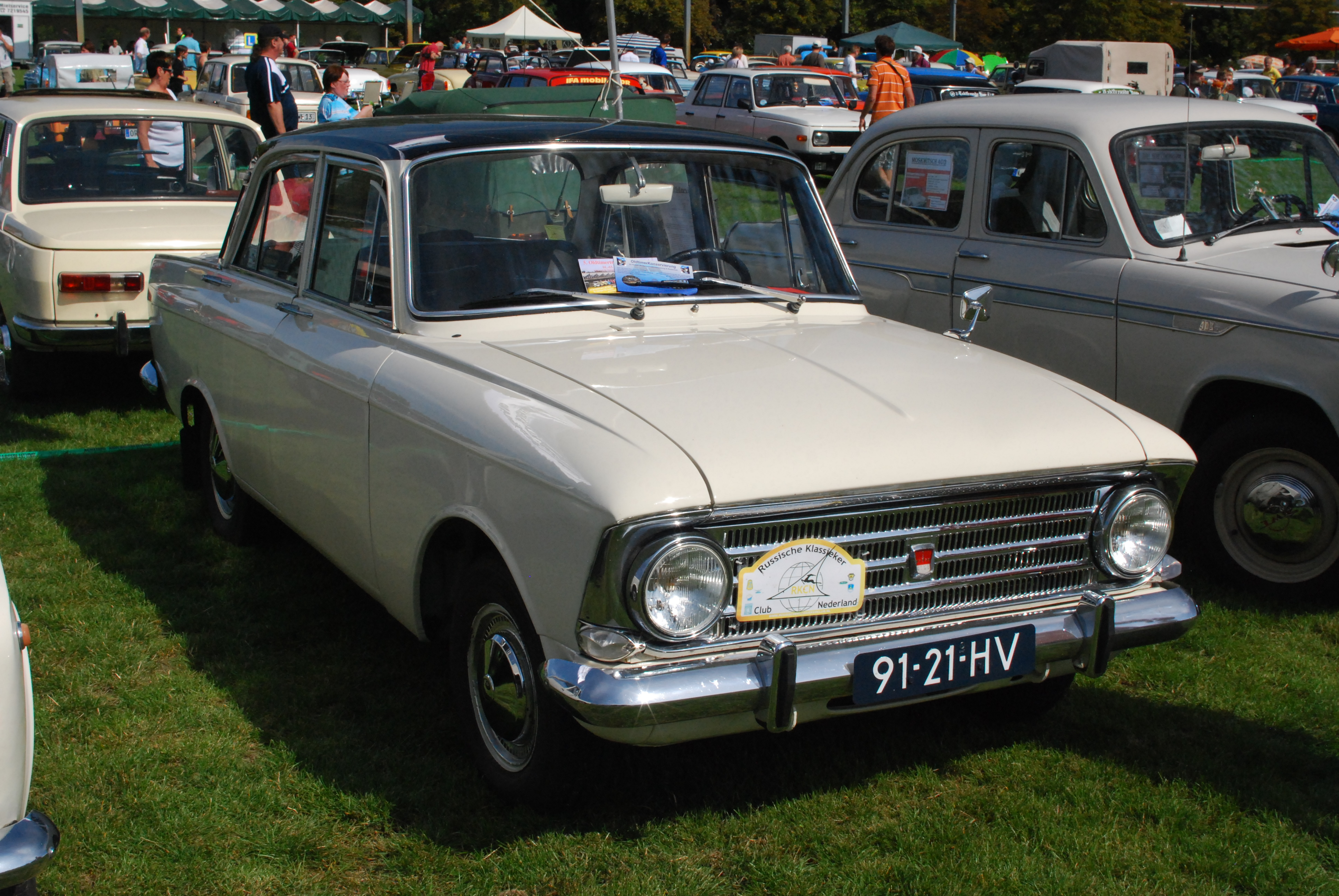
Moskvitch 408

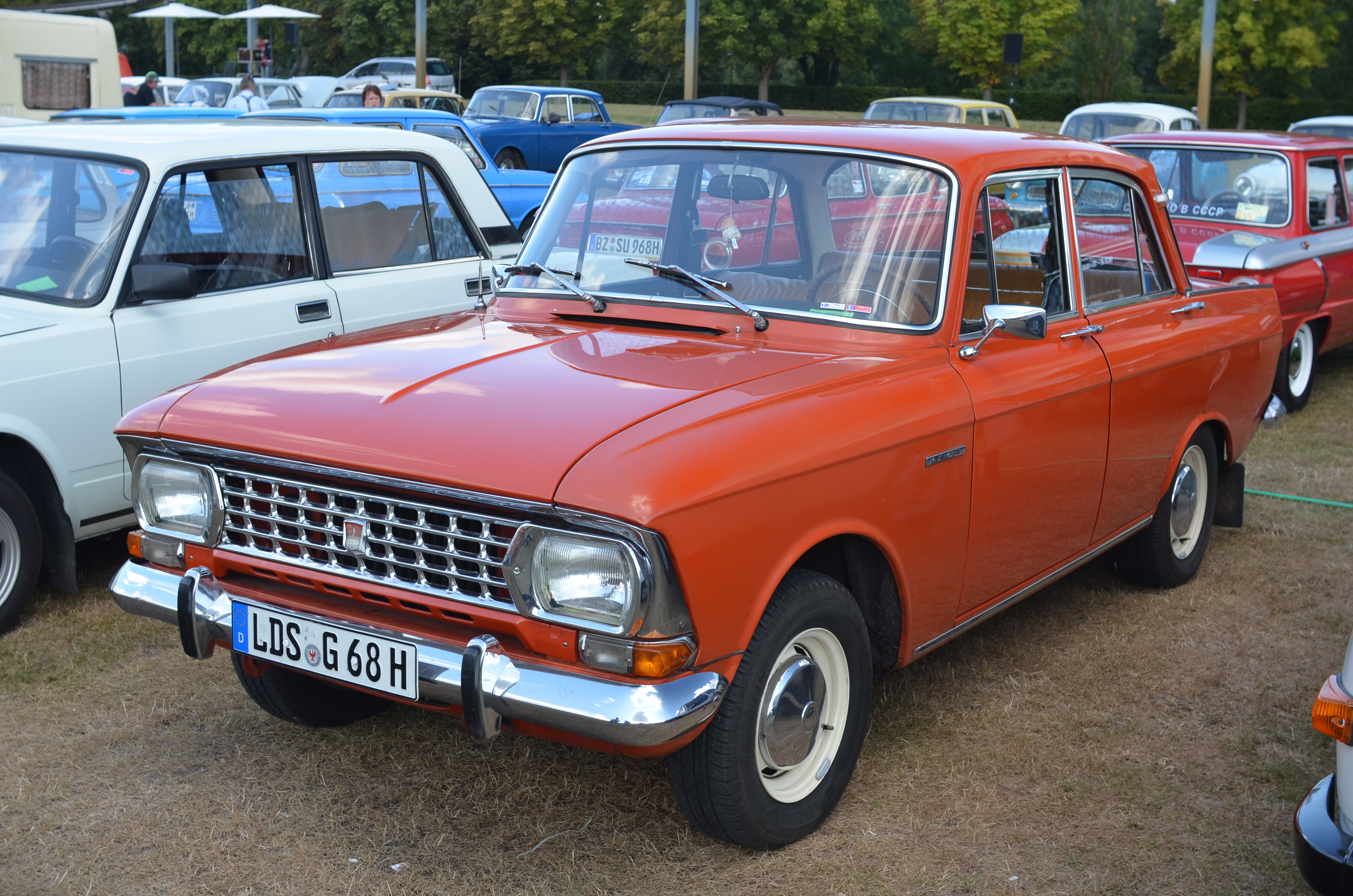
Moskvitch 412

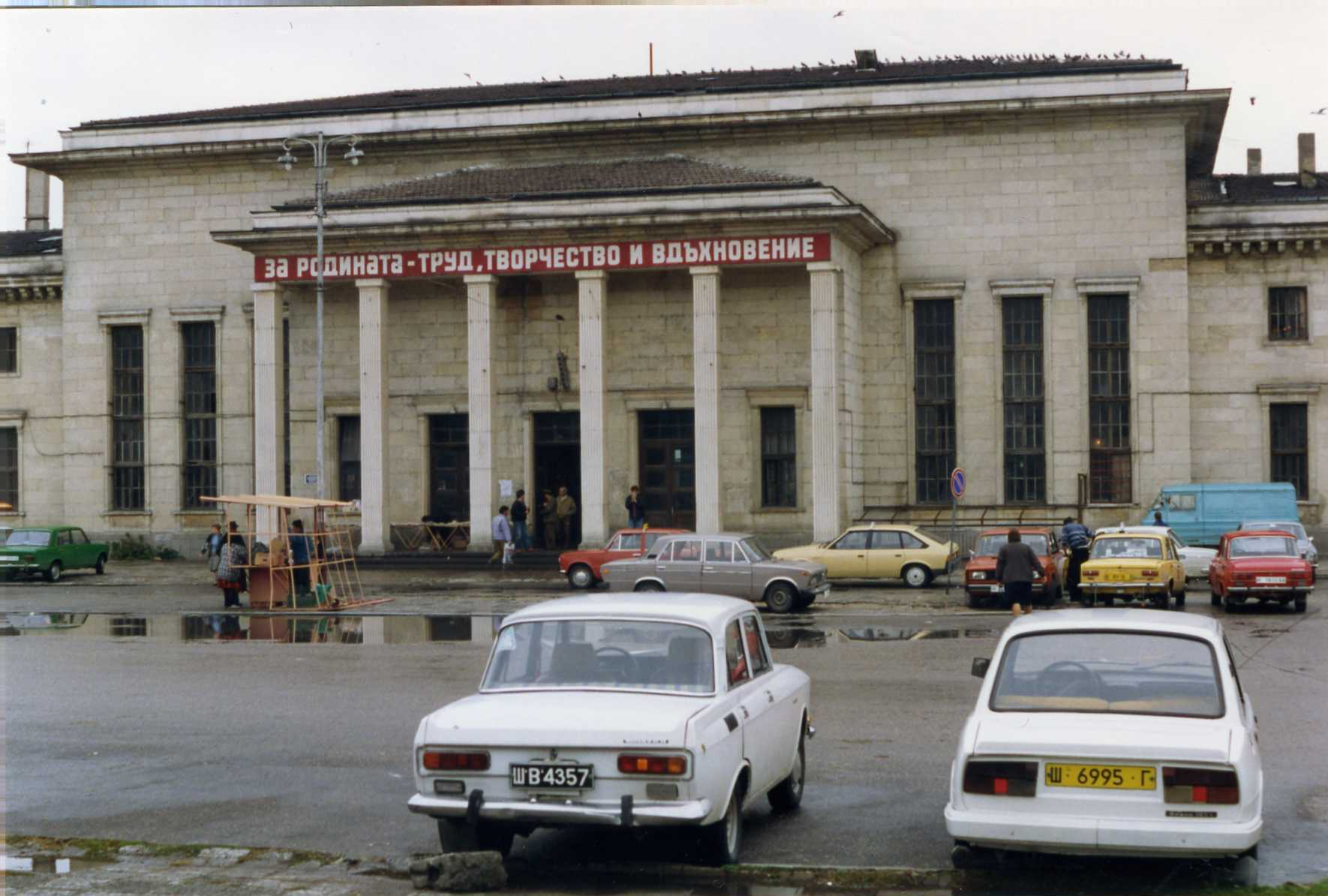
Moskvitch 2140

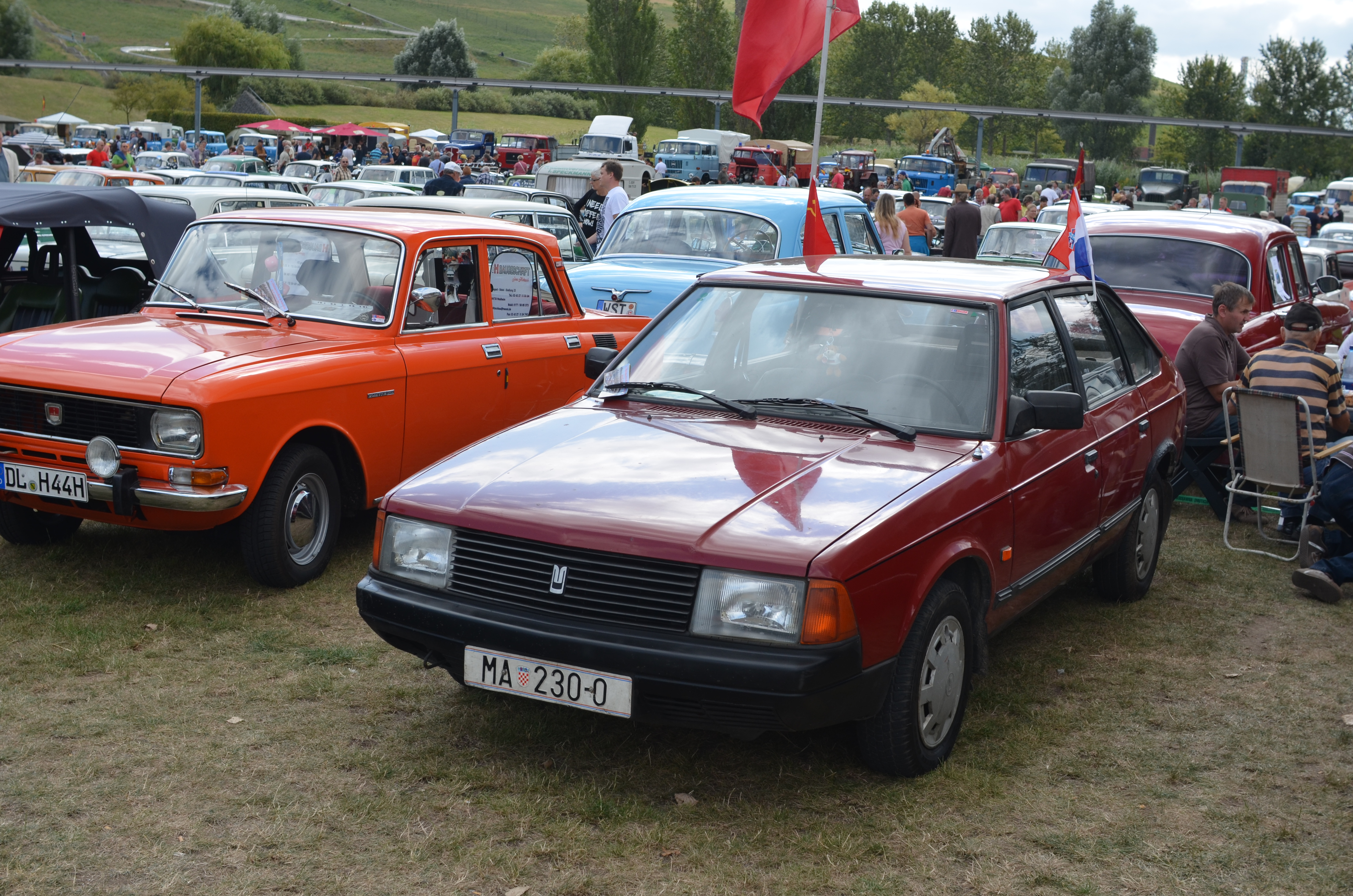
2141 Aleko with 1.5 L engine

Between 1966 and 1990, the Moskvitch 408, 412, 2140, and 2141 Aleko were produced under license in Lovech, Bulgaria, by Balkancar, under the Rila marque. Some of them were identical in configuration to those produced by Moskvitch/AZLK, while others, like their Belgian counterparts, used Perkins diesel engines.

== Awards ==
Order of the October Revolution

Order of the Red Banner of Labour

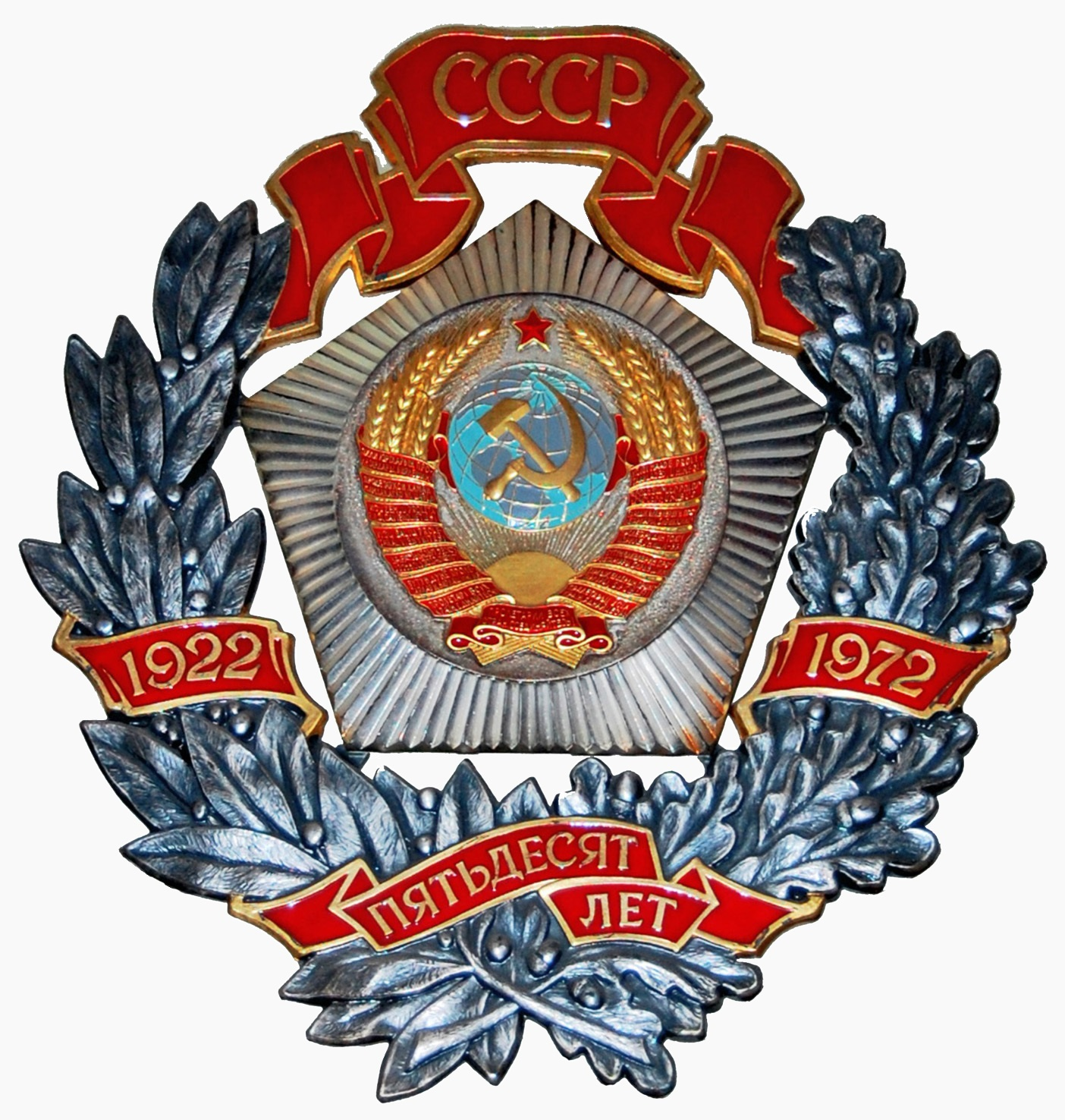
Honorary Award for the 50th Anniversary of the Soviet Union

== See also ==
- Automobile model numbering system in the Soviet Union and Russia
