= Technopolis Moscow =

Industrial park in Russia

Coordinates: 55.7072°N 37.7247°E

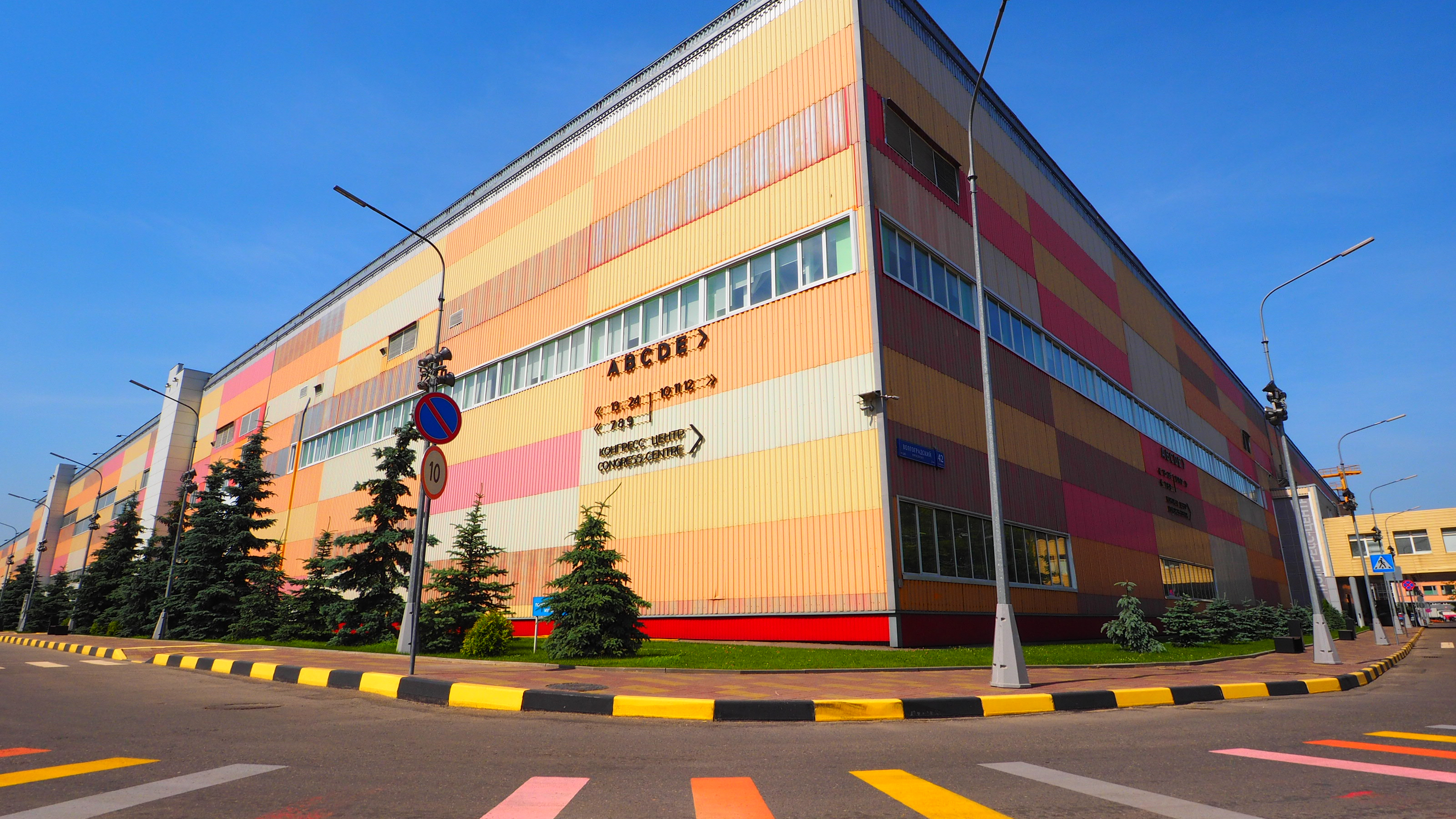
Technopolis "Moscow" viewed from the street

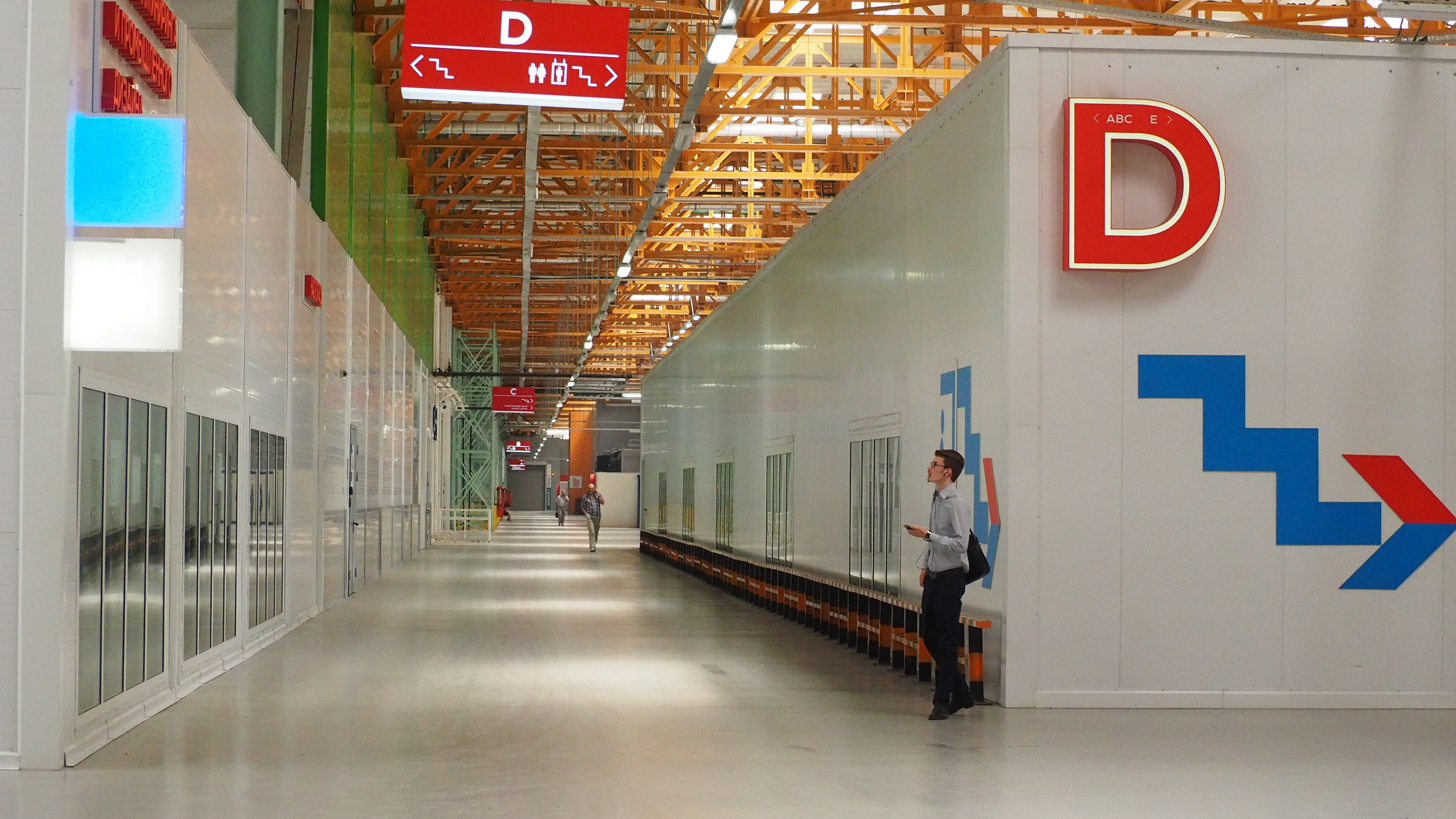
Inside Technopolis "Moscow"

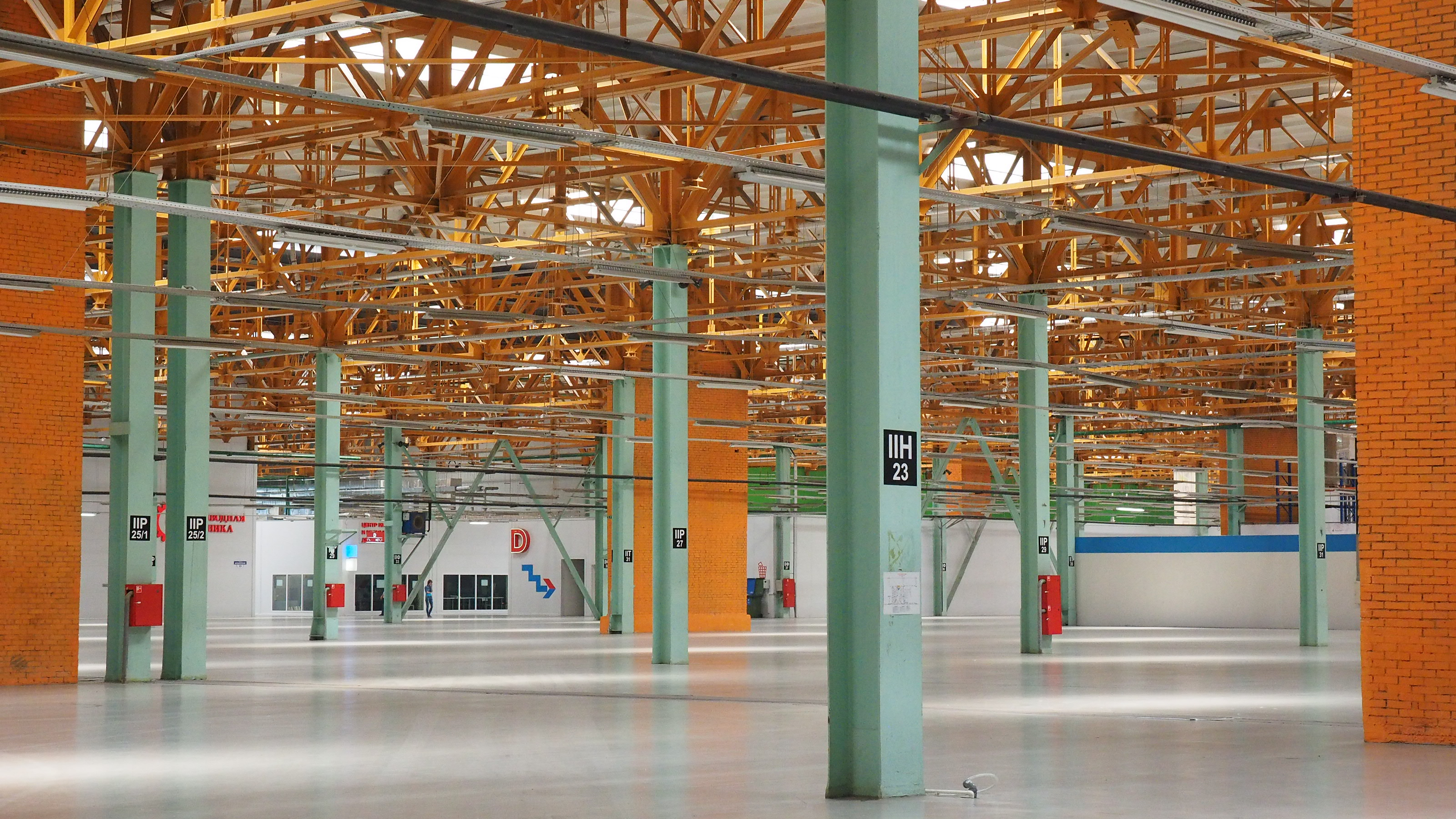
Inside Technopolis "Moscow"

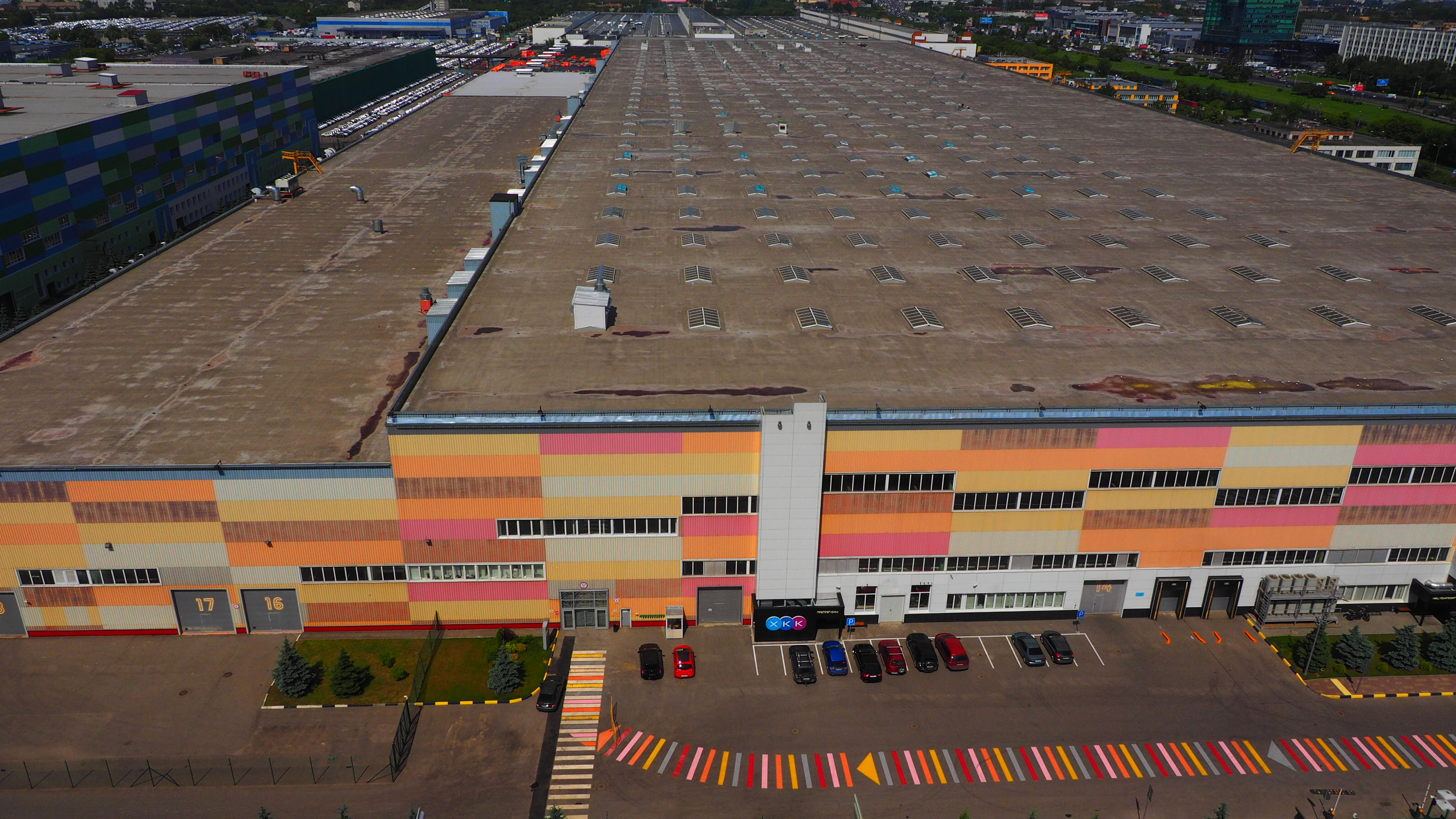
Building#5 of Technopolis "Moscow"

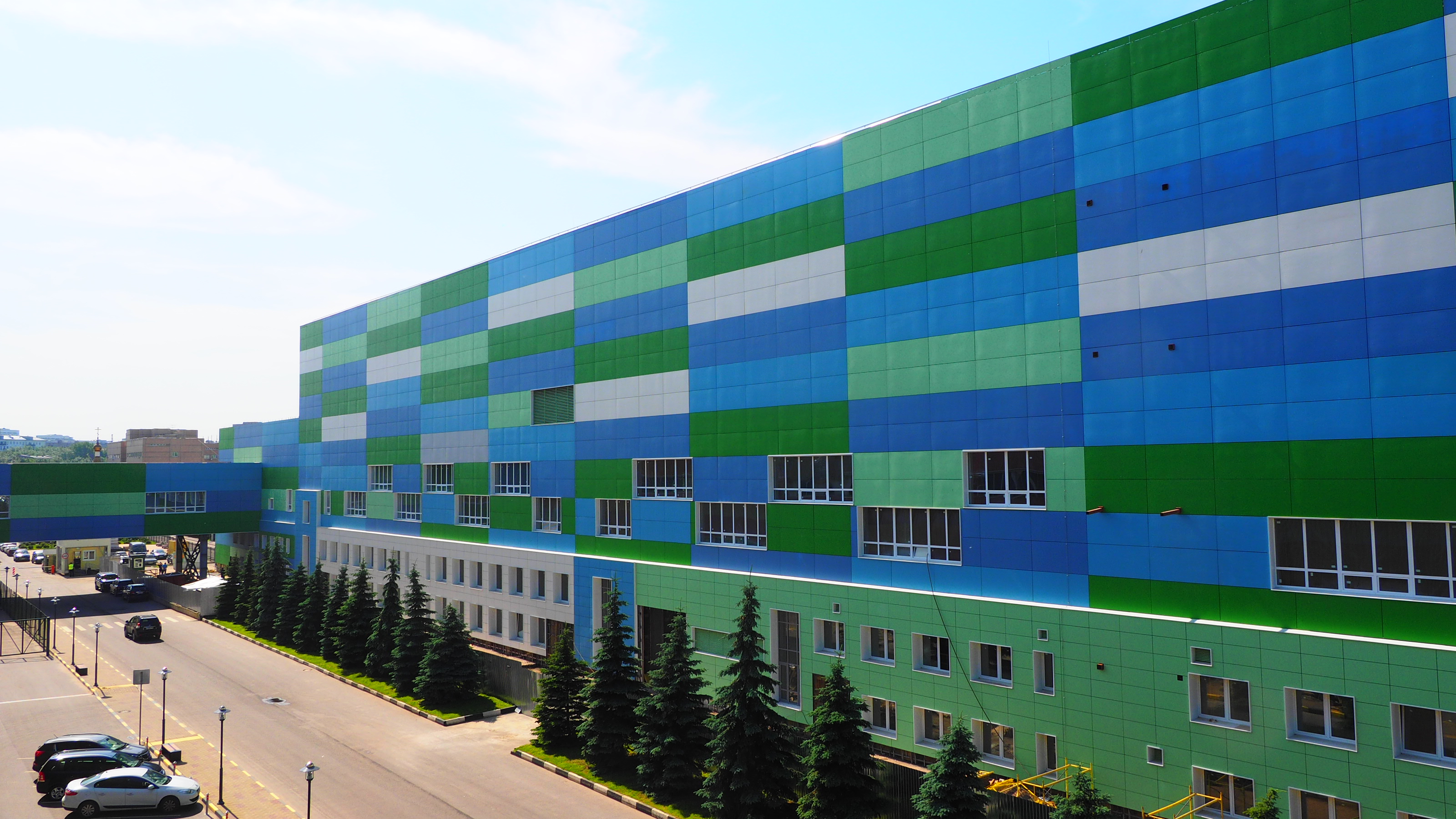
Building#24 of Technopolis "Moscow" (under reconstruction)

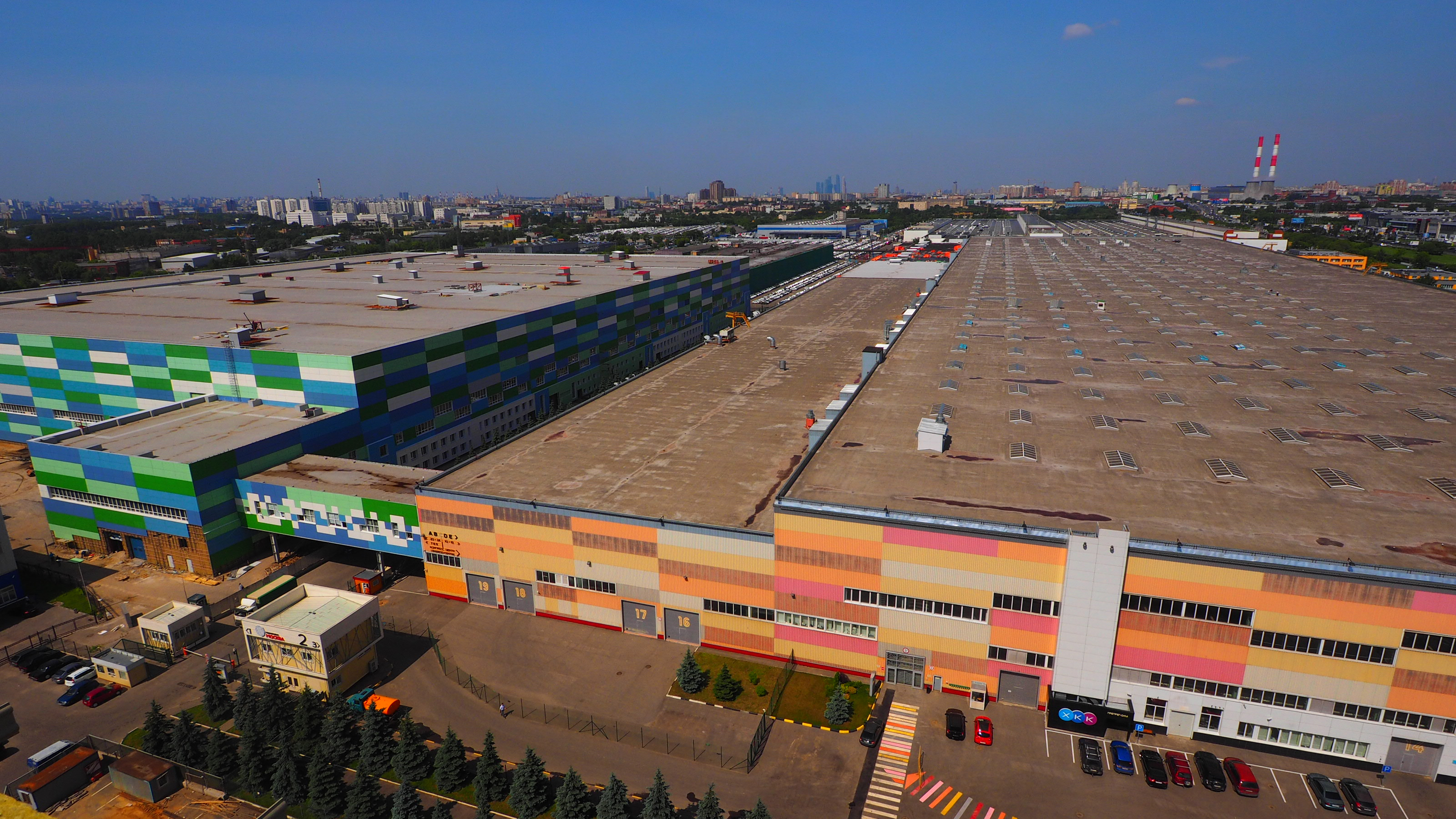
Building#5 and Building #24 of Technopolis "Moscow"

Technopolis Moscow is a specialized territory for innovative production development in Moscow, created under the control of SUE Stroyexprom.

Development of Technopolis is supervised by the Department of Science, Industrial Policy and Entrepreneurship of Moscow Government. The project is implemented under personal control of the Mayor of Moscow, Sergey Sobyanin. Technopolis Moscow is located on the territory of the South-Eastern Administrative Okrug of Moscow, close to Tekstilshchiki metro station.

Property complex of Technopolis Moscow includes buildings located on industrial purpose land lots with a total area exceeding 32 hectares. At the beginning of 2014, industrial pavilion with a total area of 240,000 square meters operated on the territory of Technopolis Moscow. Reconstruction of the second pavilion will be completed in 2016, increasing industrial area up to 350,000 square meters.

Administrative and office premises with a total area exceeding 30,000 sq. meters are being reconstructed. They will be commissioned at the beginning of 2017.

== History ==
Technopolis was created on the territory of the former automotive factory Lenin Komsomol (AZLK) "Moskvitch". Following the enterprise's bankruptcy procedure initiation in 2006, three major property owners—Avtoframos, LLC IFC Metropol and the Moscow City Government, which transferred its control of the property to SUE "Construction and operation of industrial facilities" (SUE Stroyexprom) appeared on the territory of the factory.

In July 2010, the Moscow City Government created the Territory of Innovate Development Moskvitch (TID Moskvitch).

In December 2012, the TID Moskvitch was awarded the status of Technopolis and the name "Moscow" was adopted.

In 2013, the Council for Development of Innovations under the Moscow City Government has created a special working team for development of Technopolis "Moscow". Members of the working team included leading experts from Russia, USA, Canada, Germany, France in the field of promotion of innovations and creation of specialized territories. They consult the Moscow City Government regarding selected development strategy of Technopolis considering the best global practices of industrial redevelopment and creation of specialized innovative territories. Esko Aho, Senior Advisor of NOKIA corporation, the former Prime Minister of Finland was appointed the chairman of the working team.

In 2012 and 2013, Technopolis Moscow was visited by the Mayor of Moscow city Sergey Sobyanin. In August 2013, Deputy Prime Minister Dmitry Rogozin, the Head of Rosatom Sergey Kiriyenko and the Minister for Open Government Mikhail Abyzov visited Technopolis.

In February 2014, Technopolis Moscow was visited by the Minister of Industry and Trade Denis Manturov.

On 3 July 2014, Technopolis Moscow was visited by the Mayor of Moscow Sergey Sobyanin with a purpose of commissioning new production – electronic optics elements production line based on microelectromechanical systems of Mapper Lithography (the Netherlands). Mapper Lithography is a portfolio company of RUSNANO LTD Management Company.

On 13 September 2014, with the support of the Department of Culture of Moscow as a part of the Best city on Earth Festival the festival of graffiti was conducted in Technopolis Moscow. The Festival coincided with the completion of the biggest picture in graffiti style in Russia with an area of 7,200 m^{2}, and its subject was innovation. Established record was entered to the Record Book of Russia.

In October 2014, the Annual International Forum and Exposition "Open Innovations" was held on the territory of Technopolis; more than 15,000 participants from 70 countries took part in it. China was Official partner country. On the first day of the Forum, the Heads of Government of Russia and China Dmitry Medvedev and Li Keqiang took part in the work of the III Moscow International Forum for Innovative Development "Open Innovations" and got acquainted with exhibits of Open Innovations Expo.

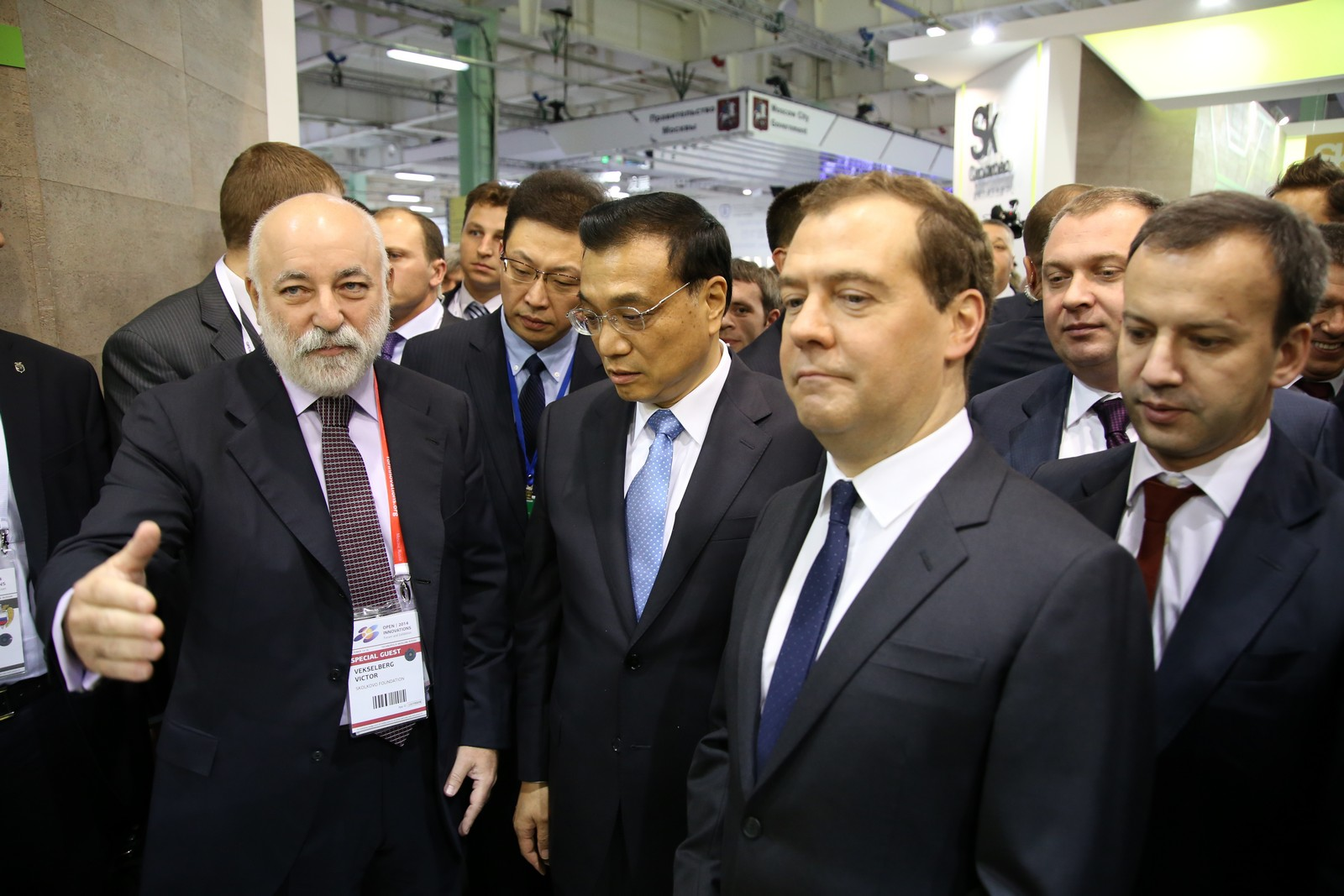
Moscow, 2014. Opening of the infrastructure projects at Technopolis "Moscow"

On 24 November 2014, a public opening of infrastructural projects created by the Moscow City Government for the support of high tech companies in the capital city took place in Technopolis Moscow. A unit of clean premises was opened for companies engaged in microelectronics with a total area of 5,100 m^{2} and biopharmaceutics with total area of 2,100 m^{2}. HackSpace Center for Engineering and Industrial Design for engineers working on technological solutions was presented to the public as well as the Center for Robotic Engineering and Automation. The Moscow City Government invested over RUB 1 billion in these projects.

In February 2015, Technopolis Expo Center with a total area over 5,000 m^{2} was opened. The Center became the venue for innovative and specialized expositions in the field of art-engineering and art-science.

On 19 June 2015, Prototyping Center of National Research University — Higher School of Economics launched a new project "Makers Club" in HackSPACE in Technopolis Moscow.

In July 2015, unmanned aircraft assembly and training center was opened in Technopolis Moscow.

On 25 September 2015, the Russian stage of the International Engineering-Technical Challenge Formula Student was held in Technopolis Moscow. The Challenge was visited by the Mayor of Moscow Sergey Sobyanin.

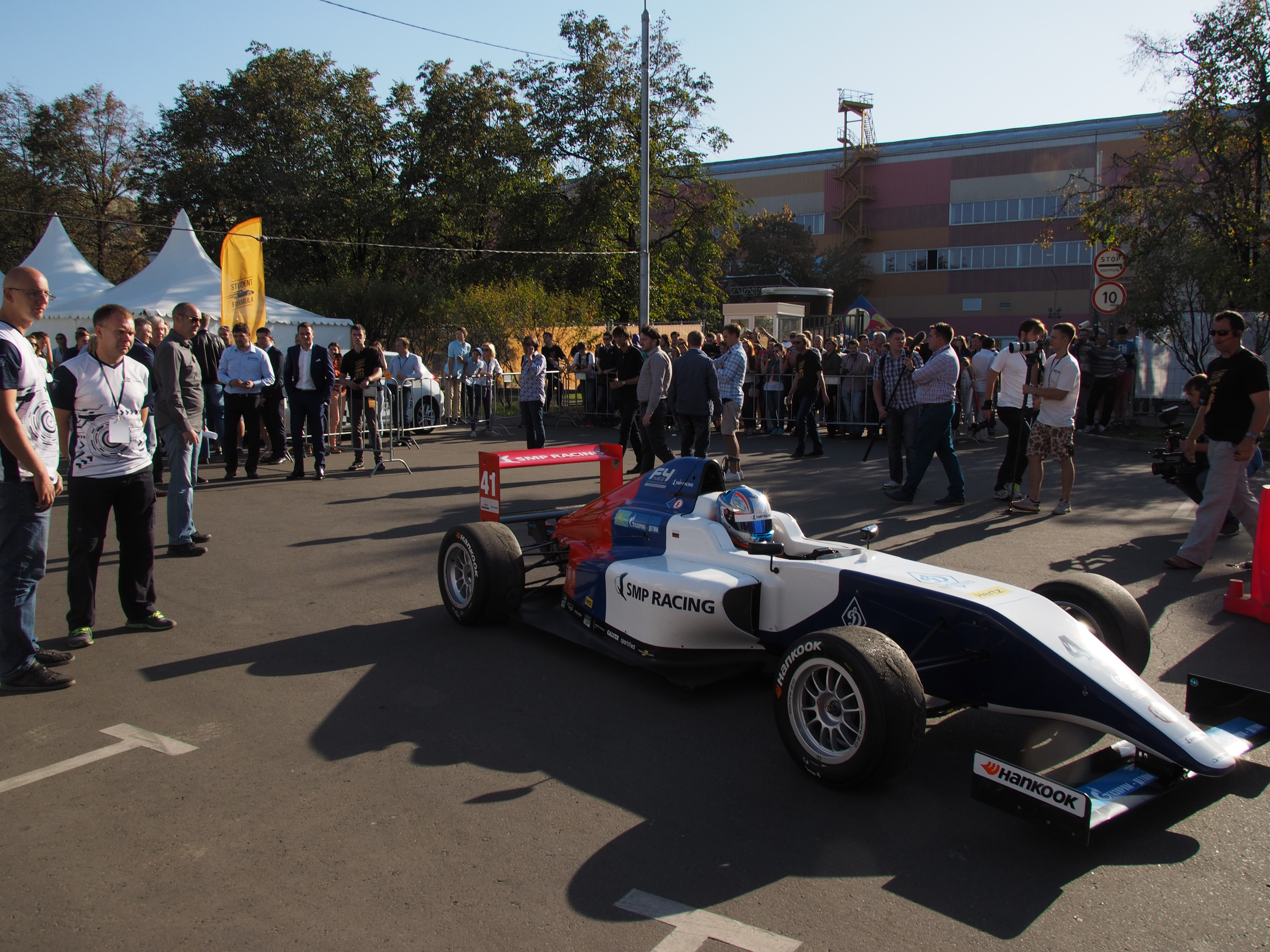
The Russian stage of the International Engineering-Technical Challenge "Formula Student" at Technopolis "Moscow"

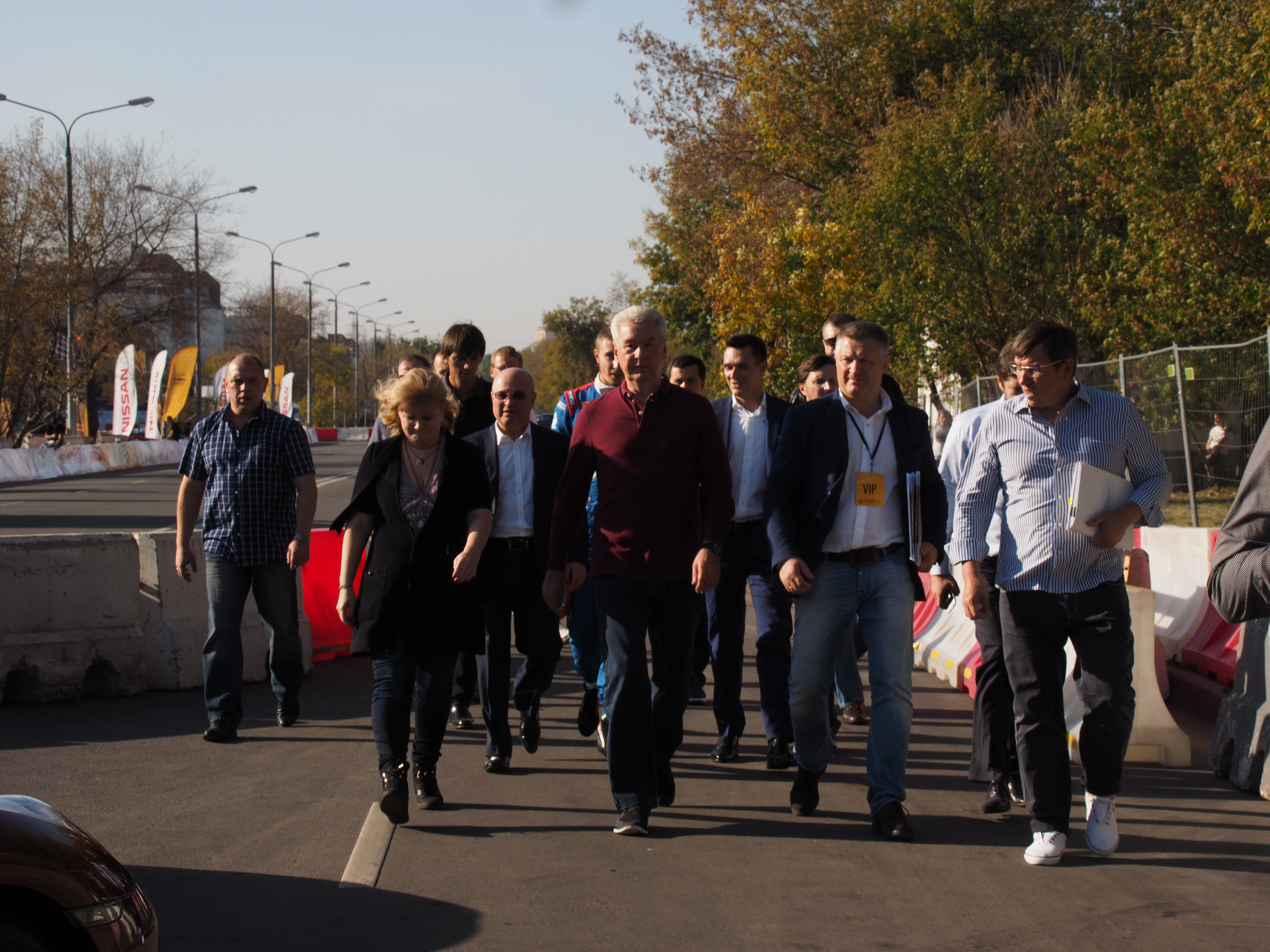
From right to left: O.E. Bocharov, I.V. Ishchenko, S.S. Sobyanin, N.A. Sergunina. Moscow, 2015

At the beginning of December 2015, Technopolis was visited by the Minister of Education and Science of the Russian Federation Dmitry Livanov; he opened the National Exposition-Forum VuzPromExpo 2015.

In December 2015, All-Russian Summit "Open Data" with the participation of the Russian Minister for Open Government Mikhail Abyzov was conducted at Technopolis Moscow.

In the middle of December 2015, Technopolis Moscow was visited by the Mayor of Moscow Sergey Sobyanin.

On 11 December 2015, a new production facility of a global developer and producer of photonic integrated circuits for telecommunication equipment NeoPhotonics was opened in Technopolis. The company was started by the Deputy Chairman of the Russian Government Arkady Dvorkovich and the chairman of the Board of RUSNANO LTD Management Company Anatoly Chubais.

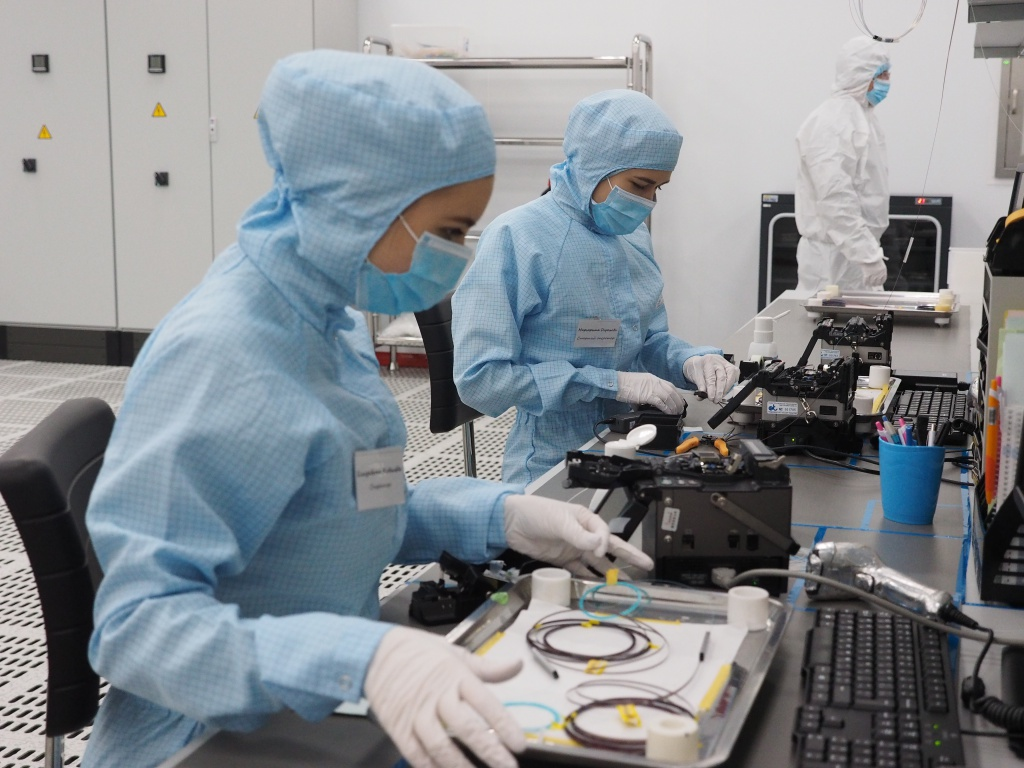
A cleanroom in Technopolis "Moscow"

On 25 May 2016, Igor Ishchenko, Director General of Technopolis Moscow and Jean Louis Stasi, the President of Schneider Electric signed the agreement "On cooperation and organization of interaction of the parties for innovative development of the infrastructure of Technopolis Moscow". Sergey Sobyanin attended the signing ceremony.

In May 2016, Engineering Center of Global Concern ABB was opened in Technopolis Moscow. The grand opening was visited by Natalya Sergunina, Deputy Mayor of Moscow in the Moscow City Government for Economic Policy and Property and Land Relations.

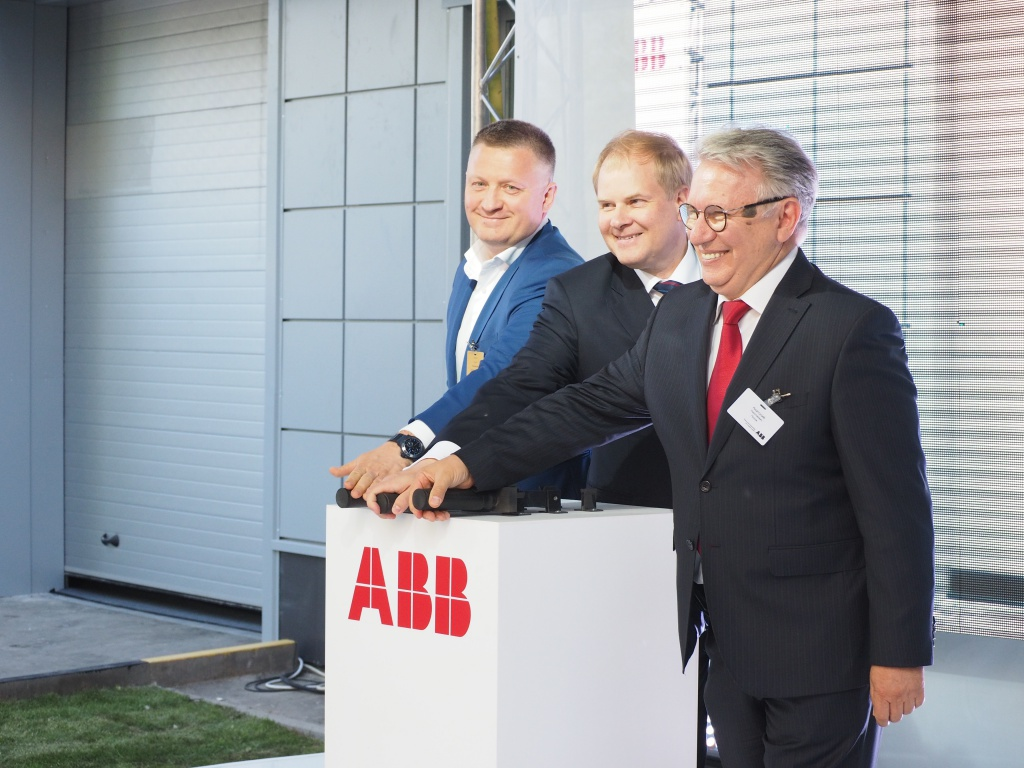
From left to right: Igor Ishchenko, Pekka Tiitinen, Anatoly Popov. Moscow, 2016

On 5 October 2025, a building of Technopolis Moscow caught fire. It is reported the building was used (in part) for building drones used in the Kremlin/Russia war on Ukraine.

== Characteristics ==
After the bankruptcy of AZLK, three premises of the factory were transferred to Technopolis Moscow: the main automotive assembly workshop, press shop and power unit. Five more buildings and structures of AZLK have been purchased by the Moscow Government and joined Technopolis Moscow later. The goal of development of Technopolis "Moscow" is an establishment an innovative ecosystem in Moscow and creation of new jobs on advanced high tech production facilities and in innovative companies.

The tasks of Technopolis are creation of user-friendly infrastructure for development of innovative companies on the territory of Moscow, including the provision of industrial and administrative-office areas for a long-term lease and integration of Technopolis residents in the programs of innovative industrial production support provided for by the Moscow Government.

The territory of Technopolis includes:

- Production facilities
- Engineering infrastructure
- Scientific-innovative customs post and a temporary storage warehouse
- "Clean rooms" for biopharmaceutics and microelectronics
- Logistics center
- Congress Center
- Administrative-office service rooms and premises, as well as the HackSpace.

At the beginning of 2016, commercial investments in the property complex of Technopolis Moscow made up RUB 12 billion, where 9.8 billion are investments of residents and lessees of Technopolis Moscow in the commissioning of personal production and RUB 2.2 billion are investments of Sberbank of Russia. In 2016 it is planned to receive a credit for RUB 743 million. By the end of 2016, budgetary allocations in Technopolis will reach RUB 5.1 billion, investments of commercial companies in their production facilities on the territory of Technopolis will increase up to RUB 14.8 billion by the end of 2017.

== Tenants ==
The status of resident may be granted to companies with either Russian or foreign participation. When granting the resident status the priority is given to the companies producing high tech goods. The list of priority clusters includes:

- New materials and nanotechnologies
- Medical technologies, equipment and biopharmaceutics
- Microelectronics, optics, robotic engineering and industrial automation
- Information-communication technologies
- High tech production.

Over 50 companies became the residents and lessees of Technopolis, including:

- CJSC Holding Company Composite, which includes Prepreg SKM and LLC Nanotechnological Center of Composites
- JSC Schneider Electric
- LLC Mapper
- LLC Crocus NanoElectronics
- ArtLine Engineering
- LLC Neophotonics Corporation
- Radius Group
- CJSC Demos-Internet
- CJSC Mastertel
- Т8 Publishing Technologies
- NovaMedica
- CJSC RDC Drive Technique
- CJSC Mediann-Resheniya
- LLC Scientific Research Institute of Communication and Management Systems
- CJSC Business System Telehouse
- FSBCE Polytechnic Museum
- CJSC Goodwin Concern (Goodwin Europe)
- LLC Medplant

== Incentives and preferences of Technopolis residents ==
Starting from 2013, the residents of Technopolis Moscow have been getting incentives and preferences, established by the Moscow City Government, including:

- Incentive rate of property tax – 0% for 10 years (for anchor residents)
- Incentive rate of profit tax – 15.5% (instead of 20%) for 10 years (for anchor residents)
- A specialized customs post operates on the territory of Technopolis
- Participation in different municipal programs of incentives and subsidies
- Simplified system of interaction with state authorities.
