= Renault Russia =

Automobile manufacturer (1998–2022)

Coordinates: 55.71271°N 37.71337°E

JSC Renault Russia
- Formerly: Avtoframos (1998-2014)
- Type: Subsidiary
- Industry: Automotive
- Founded: July 2, 1998; 28 years ago
- Defunct: May 16, 2022; 4 years ago
- Headquarters: Moscow, Russia
- Products: Automobiles
- Number of employees: 4,453 (2016)
- Parent: Renault
- Website: www.renault.ru

Renault Russia (Russian: Рено Россия, romanized: Reno Rossiya, IPA: [rʲɪˈno rɐˈsʲijə]), known until 2014 as Avtoframos (Russian: Автофрамос, romanized: Avtoframos), was a Russian automotive company established in 1998 by the Moscow city and Renault. It was a wholly owned Renault subsidiary from 2012 onwards. The company has gone defunct in May 2022 as its assets were acquired by the Moscow city government.

== History ==
In July 1998, the then Deputy Mayor of Moscow, Valery Shantsev, and a representative from Renault signed an agreement to create an automotive joint venture, based on an old OAO Moskvitch facility. Renault and the city of Moscow owned equally the new company. The car assembly started in April 1999. By 2005, the plant was at full production and in 2010 its capacity was doubled to 160,000 cars per year.

In October 2004, Renault purchased a 26% of the Moscow's share in the partnership and in 2006 increased its participation to 94.1%. At the end 2012, the French automaker purchased the remaining stake of Avtoframos.

In July 2014, Renault announced the renaming of its Russian subsidiary, changing its name from Avtoframos to Renault Russia in order to strengthen the company's relationship with the Renault-badged, Russian-made cars within the clients.

In March 2022, following the 2022 Russian invasion of Ukraine and international pressure to doing so, Renault "suspended" the Renault Russia operations. In May 2022, Renault said it had agreed to sell the company back to the Moscow government. The Moscow city plans to use Renault Russia assets to relaunch Moskvitch-badged production.

== Products ==
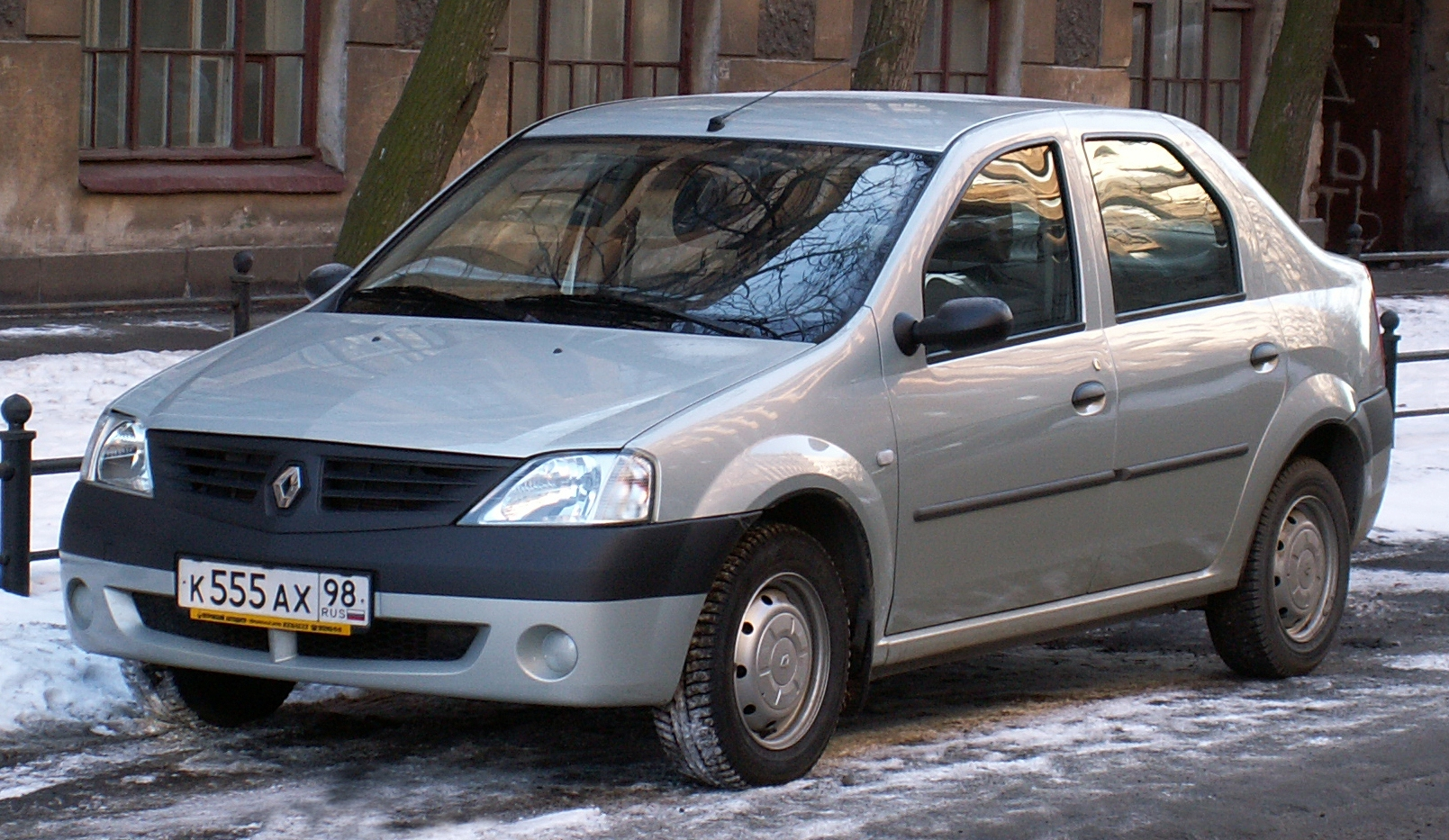
First series Renault Logan

From the end of 2002 to 2004 the plant produced the Renault Symbol, the three-box version of the Renault Clio.

Since 2005, the plant assembles the Renault Logan. The total production in 2007 was 69,000 cars, with an increase to 73,000 cars in 2008.

In 2009, the plant started producing the Renault Sandero hatchback, which was followed by the Renault Duster in 2011.

In 2013, the company produced 195,112 vehicles, which were Duster, Mégane, Fluence, Logan and Sandero.
