= Balkancar =

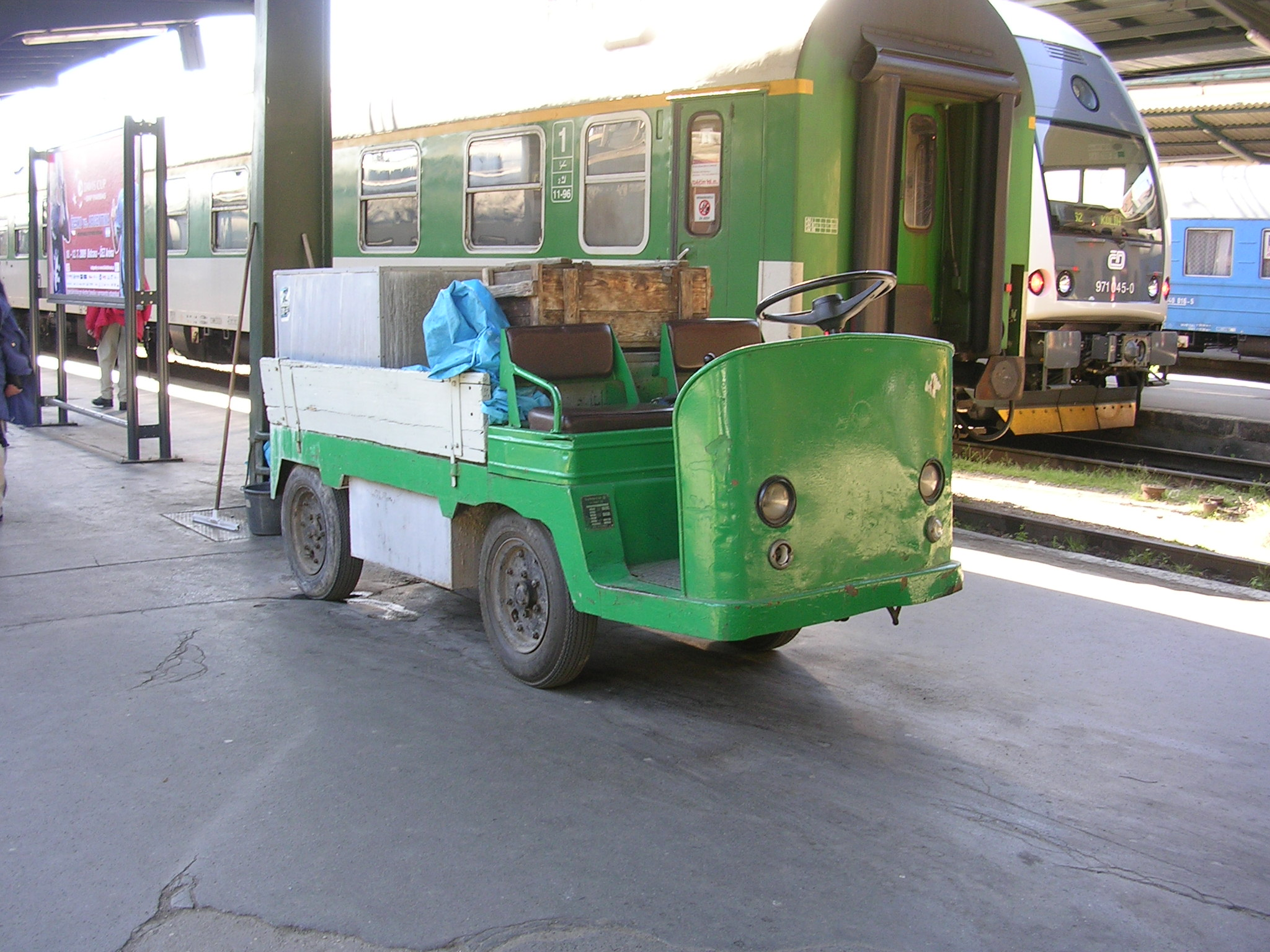
Balcancar electric truck in Prague, Czech Republic.

Balkancar is a Bulgarian company for research and manufacturing of electrical vehicles for the production industry.

== History ==
The world's first electrical driven forklift in Bulgaria was produced in 1951 in the tram and trolleybus factory "September 6" in Sofia. The production of forklifts in Bulgaria is one of the sectors of the mechanical engineering which contains significant world achievements. With the development of the first experimental series of lifting and transport machines in 1952, production grew and improved. At the end of the 1970s, Bulgaria led the world in the number of forklifts it produced.

As well as the main assembly factories, the Balkancar association in the 1980s also included enterprises for the production of intermediate products used in the creation of electric and forklift trucks. At the end of the 1980's, it had 39 divisions - 31 in the country and 8 abroad. Its factories also produce buses, cars, and bicycles.

In Bulgaria, the traditions in the production and supply of high quality and affordable lifting and transport equipment under the brand "Balkancar" continue to be produced, albeit on a much smaller scale than in the past. Different types of industrial vehicles are produced: electric trucks, forklifts, platform trucks, tugs, and hoists.
