= Steve Mattin =

English automobile designer (born 1964)

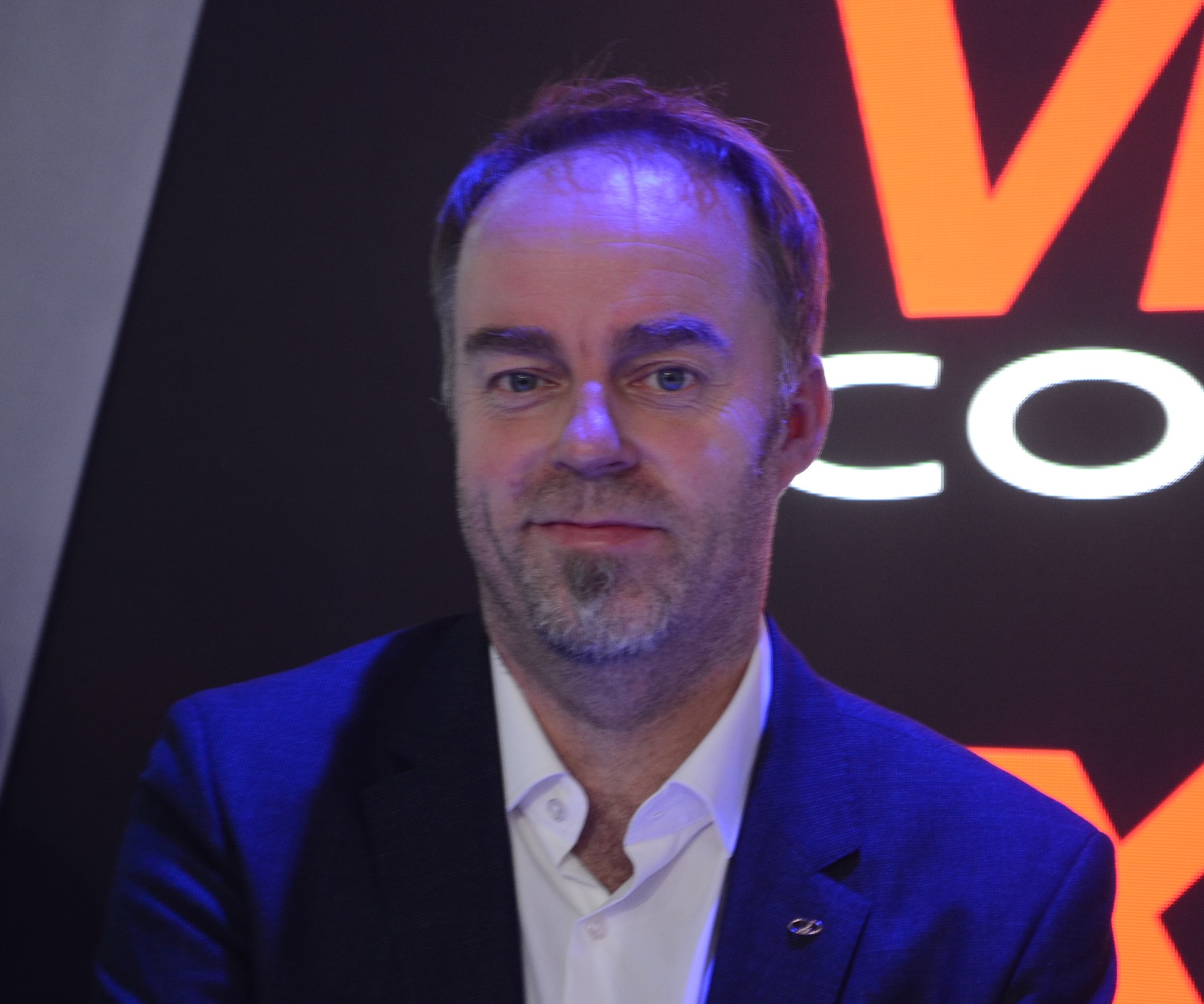
- Born: 29 October 1964 (age 61); Bedford, England
- Occupation: automobile designer
- Employer: AvtoVAZ
- Known for: S-Class, M-Class, SL, SLK, SLR McLaren, Maybach Mercedes, Grand Sports Tourer, Volvo S60, V60, XC60.

Stephen Mattin (born 29 October 1964) is an English automobile designer. He is known as the chief designer of AvtoVAZ Lada, as well as the designer of Mercedes ML-Class and GL-Class E vehicles.

== Personal background ==
Steve Mattin was born in Bedford, England on 29 October 1964 and grew up in Wootton. In 1987, he graduated from Coventry University, specialising in industrial design.

== Career ==
In 1987, Mattin joined Mercedes-Benz in Sindelfingen, where he signed on as a designer for Daimler-Benz. He served in that role until 1990, when he was promoted Senior Designer. In 1993, he was promoted to Design Manager, where he remained until 2000, when he was promoted to Senior Design Manager. From 2003 to 2005, his work included overseeing the interior and exterior design/redesign of the S-Class, M-Class MKII (W164), SL, SLK MKII (R171), SLR McLaren, Maybach Mercedes, and the Grand Sports Tourer concept car and its subsequent production version. He is credited with the design of Mercedes ML-Class and GL-Class vehicles.

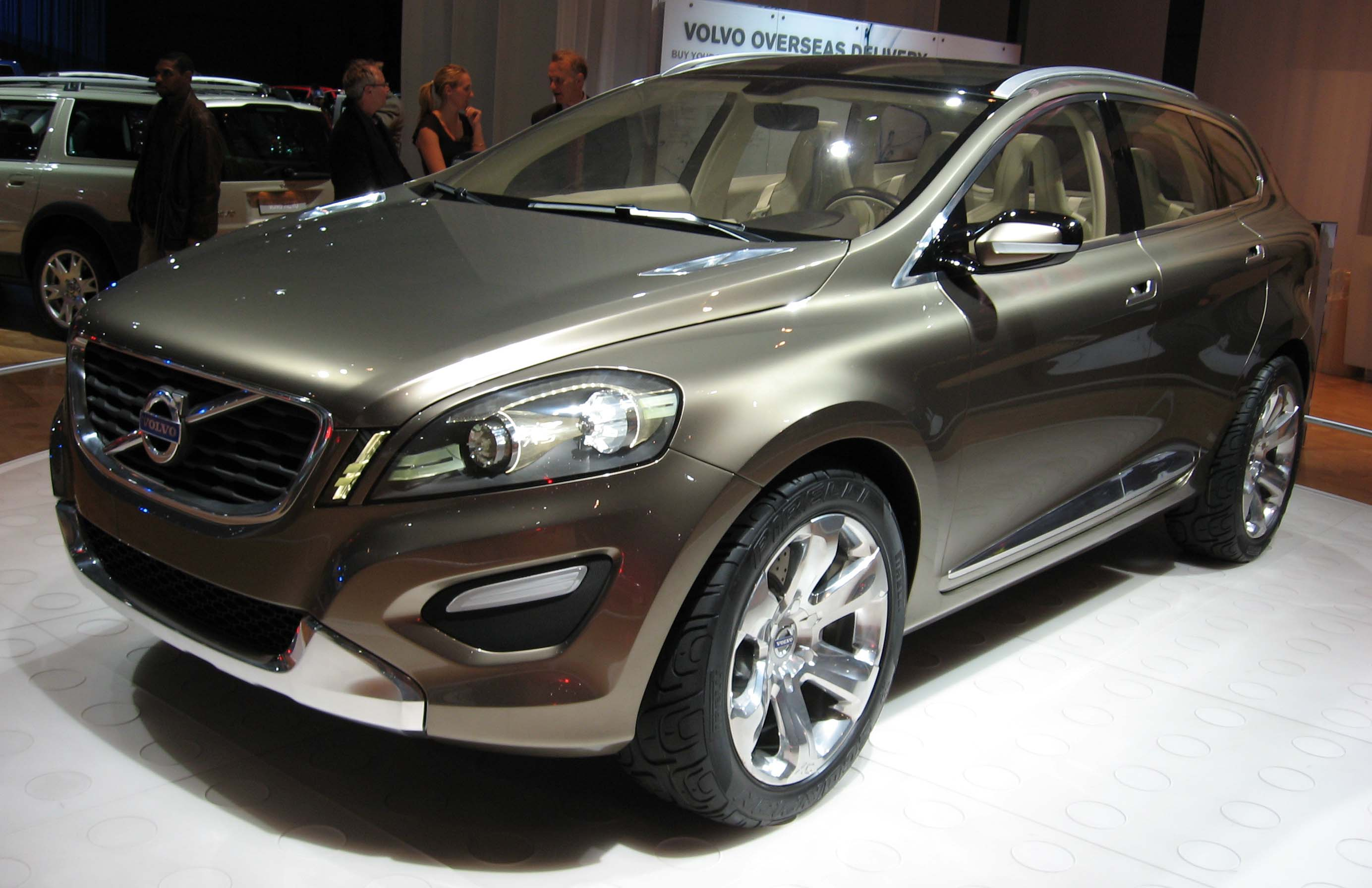
Volvo XC60 Concept, 2007

In 2004, Mattin joined the Volvo Car Corporation, where he served as the chief designer. From 2005 to 2009, he served the organization as vice-president, design director, and board member. He oversaw the creation of the Volvo S60, V60, and XC60 concept car. He was responsible for the entire design work at the 3 Global design studios: Gothenburg, Barcelona and Camarillo, and worked with all the PR-media related design communications of all Volvo vehicles launched from 2005 to 2009.

Following his tenure with Volvo, Mattin began teaching at Umeå University in Sweden. He also continues to offer independent consulting services focusing on branding and design projects, while additionally reviewing programs and projects for an original equipment manufacturing organization based in Asia.

In 2011, Mattin began working as the chief designer of AvtoVAZ's Lada, a subsidiary of the Renault-Nissan Alliance. In August 2012 during the Moscow International Automobile Salon AvtoVAZ presented the new SUV Lada XRAY designed by Mattin.

Mattin introduced the updated logo of "AvtoVAZ" at the "Auto World" international exhibition in St. Petersburg on 1 April 2015.

== Honors and awards ==
- 1986: Finalist in the PRI Plastics on the Road competition
- 1987: Winner of the Royal Society of Arts Design Bursary competition
- 1997: Named "Designer of the Year" by Autocar magazine For his design of the exterior of the then-extraordinary A-Class
- 2004: Ranked 43rd in the 2004 Autocar Top 100 Most Influential Brits in the Automotive Industry
