= Lada Xray =

Lada XRAY
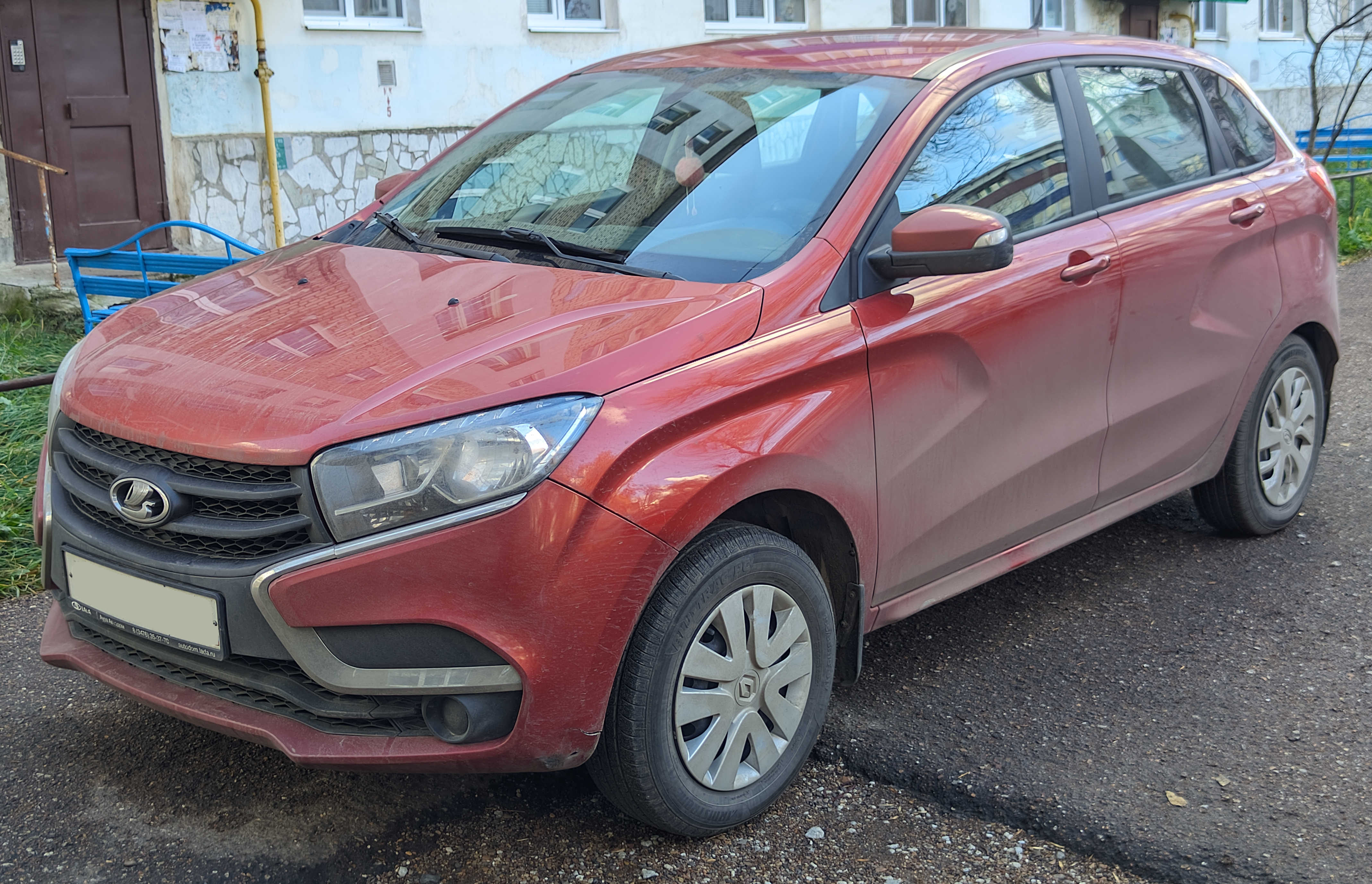
- Lada XRAY (pre-facelift)

Overview
- Manufacturer: Lada (AvtoVAZ)
- Production: 2015 – 2022
- Assembly: Tolyatti, Samara Oblast, Russia
- Designer: Steve Mattin

Body and chassis
- Class: Subcompact crossover SUV
- Body style: 5-door hatchback
- Layout: Front-engine, front-wheel-drive
- Platform: Dacia B0 platform
- Related: Dacia Sandero; Lada Largus Cross

Powertrain
- Engine: gasoline: 1.6 L VAZ-21129 I4; 1.6 L Nissan HR16DE I4; 1.8 L VAZ-21179 I4
- Transmission: 5-speed manual 5-speed automated manual Jatco CVT

Dimensions
- Wheelbase: 2,592 mm (102.0 in)
- Length: 4,165 mm (164.0 in)
- Width: 1,764 mm (69.4 in)
- Height: 1,570 mm (61.8 in)

Chronology
- Successor: Lada Azimut

The Lada XRAY is a subcompact crossover SUV produced by the Russian car manufacturer AvtoVAZ. Designed by a team led by Steve Mattin, the chief designer of the Lada Vesta, it was first presented as a concept in August 2012 at the Moscow International Automobile Salon. A newer version, the Lada XRAY Concept 2, debuted in August 2014. The production version of the Lada XRAY was released for sale in early 2016 and ceased in 2022 for unavailability of parts due to the international sanctions after the Russian invasion of Ukraine.

== Overview ==
The Lada XRAY debuted in August 2014 at the Moscow International Automobile Salon as a concept. The car was created on the basis of the Dacia Sandero hatchback produced by Automobile Dacia, subsidiary of Renault which has control over AvtoVAZ, but features an original design, engines, gearboxes, and various options, unavailable for the Sandero in the Russian market.

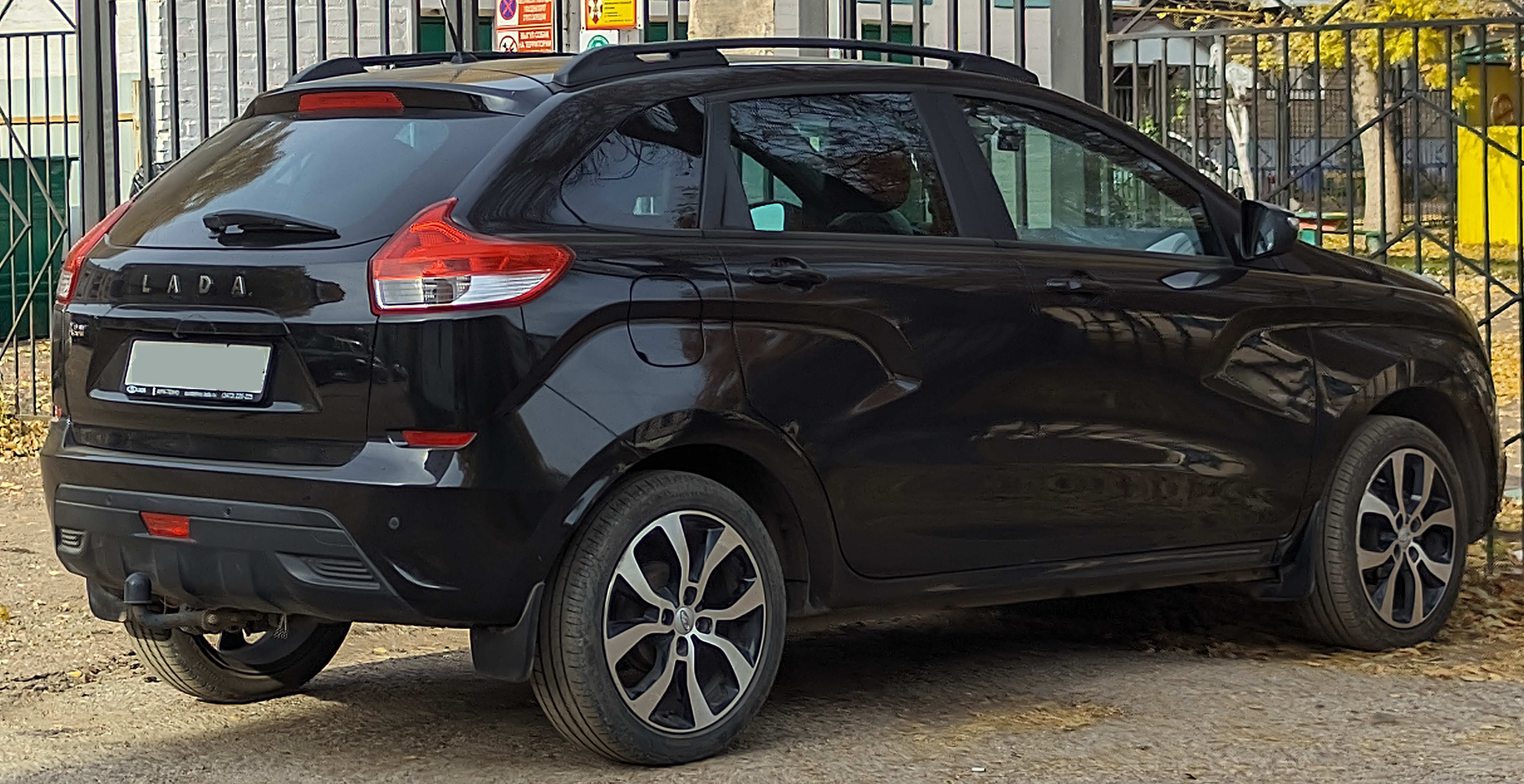
2017 Lada XRAY (rear view)

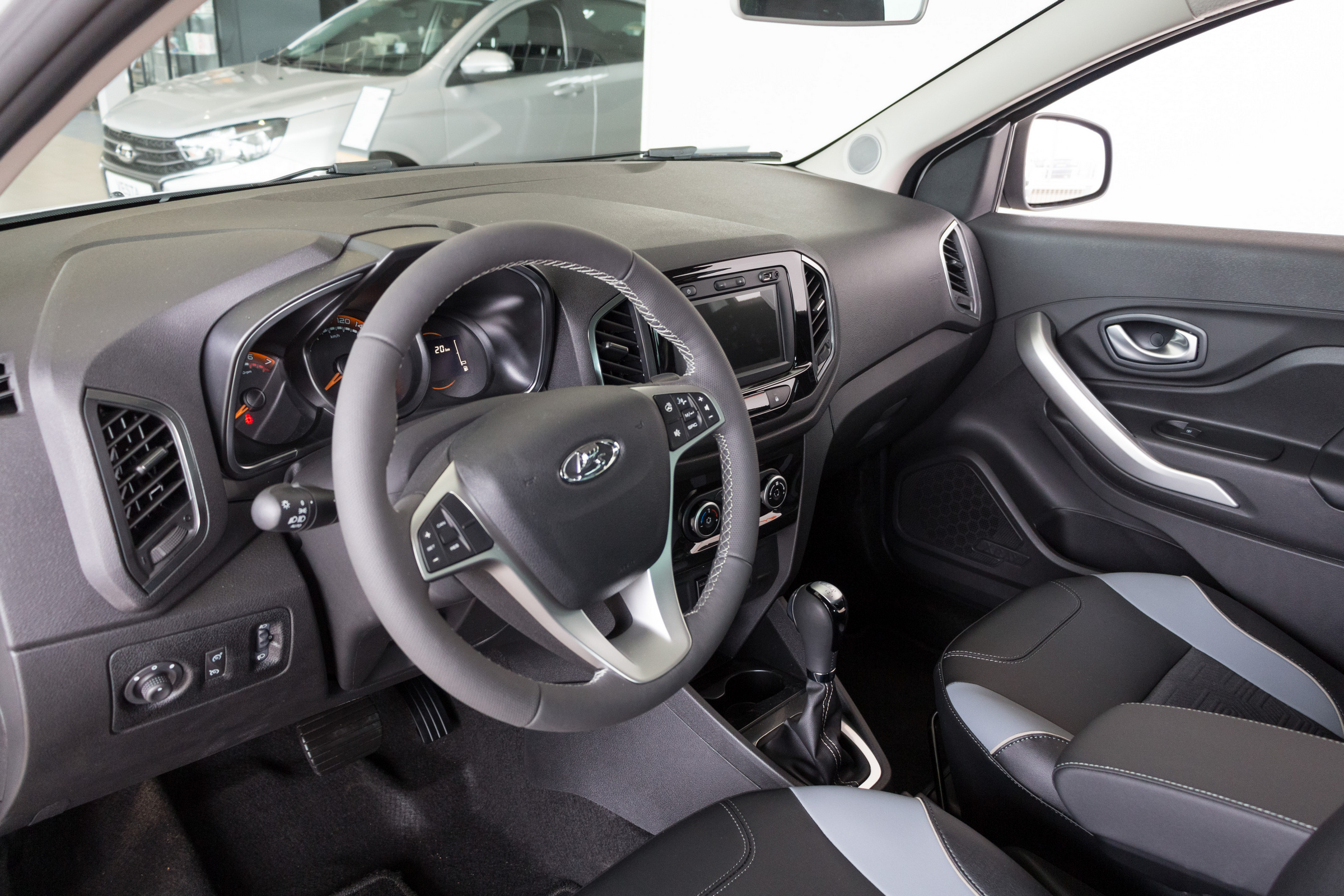
Interior view

It went into production in December 2015. Lada XRAY is the first compact city crossover in the company's history. The car's design is based on the Dacia B0 platform and is the result of Renault's and AVTOVAZ's specialists. Production started in December 2015 in full compliance with the schedule previously announced by the company. It is produced at the Togliatti manufacturing site. The start of sales was held on February 14, 2016. Lada XRAY is available in 7 trim levels.

The Lada XRAY comes with a 1.6-liter 106 hp (78 kW) or 1.8-liter 122 hp (90 kW) petrol engines, a 5-speed automated manual gearbox is available as an option for the 1.8-liter version. These VAZ-designed engines were updated to meet Euro5 emissions standards. The 1.6-liter Renault-Nissan HR16 petrol engine 110 hp (81 kW) was also offered initially but was discontinued from the range in July 2016.

The first car body was assembled in Tolyatti in October 2015 for testing, whereas the actual production of market vehicles started in December 2015. The first XRAYs appeared in the Russian market on 14 February 2016.

=== Facelift (2019) ===
In July, 2019, an updated version with the name 'Lada XRAY Cross' was launched. Supporting automatic transmission and multi media systems, like Android Auto and Apple Car Play. In April, 2020, the 'Lada XRAY Cross Instinct' version was launched, which is equipped with the Yandex.Auto multimedia system.

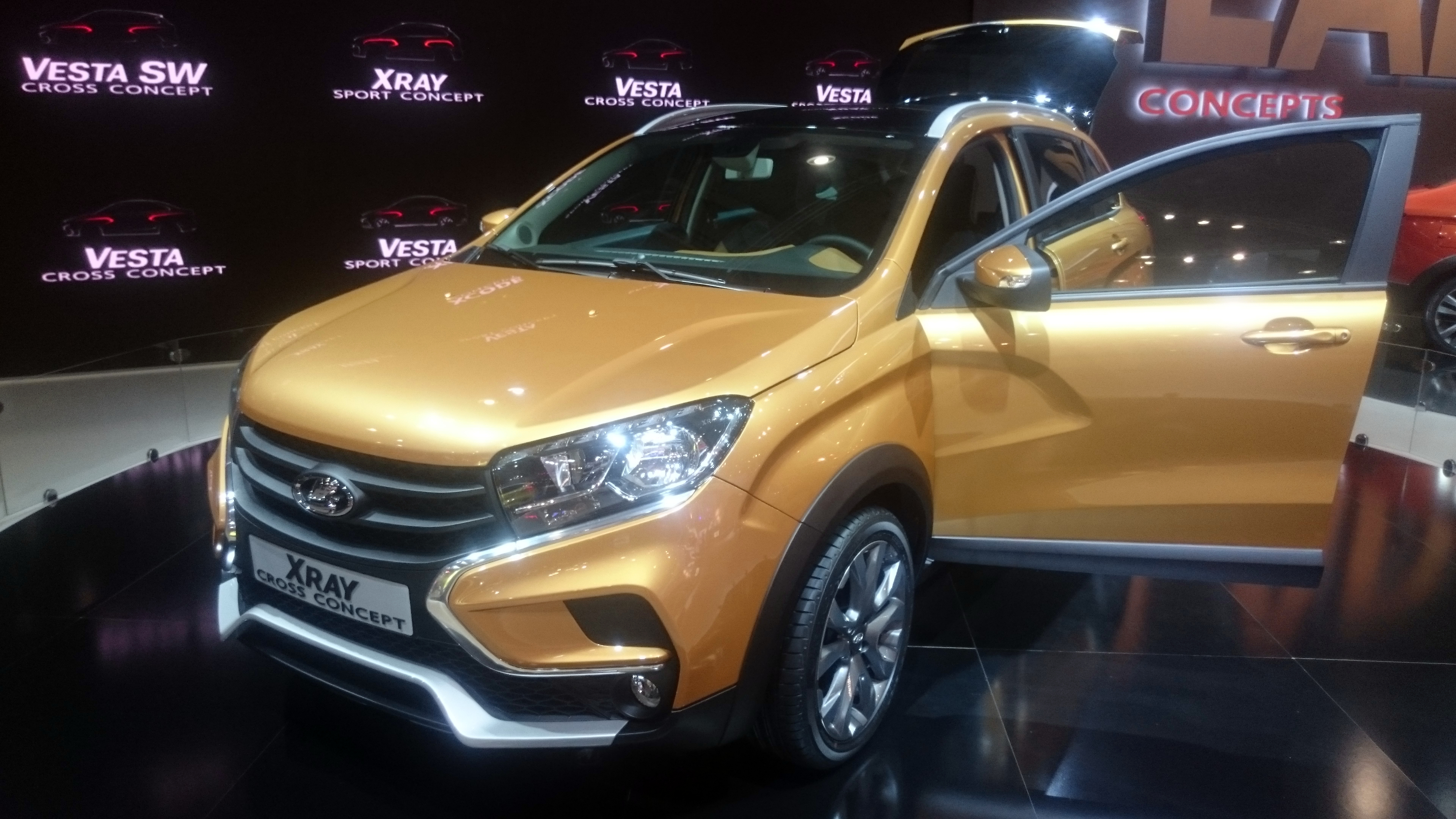
Lada XRAY Cross concept shown in Moscow International Automobile Salon, 2016

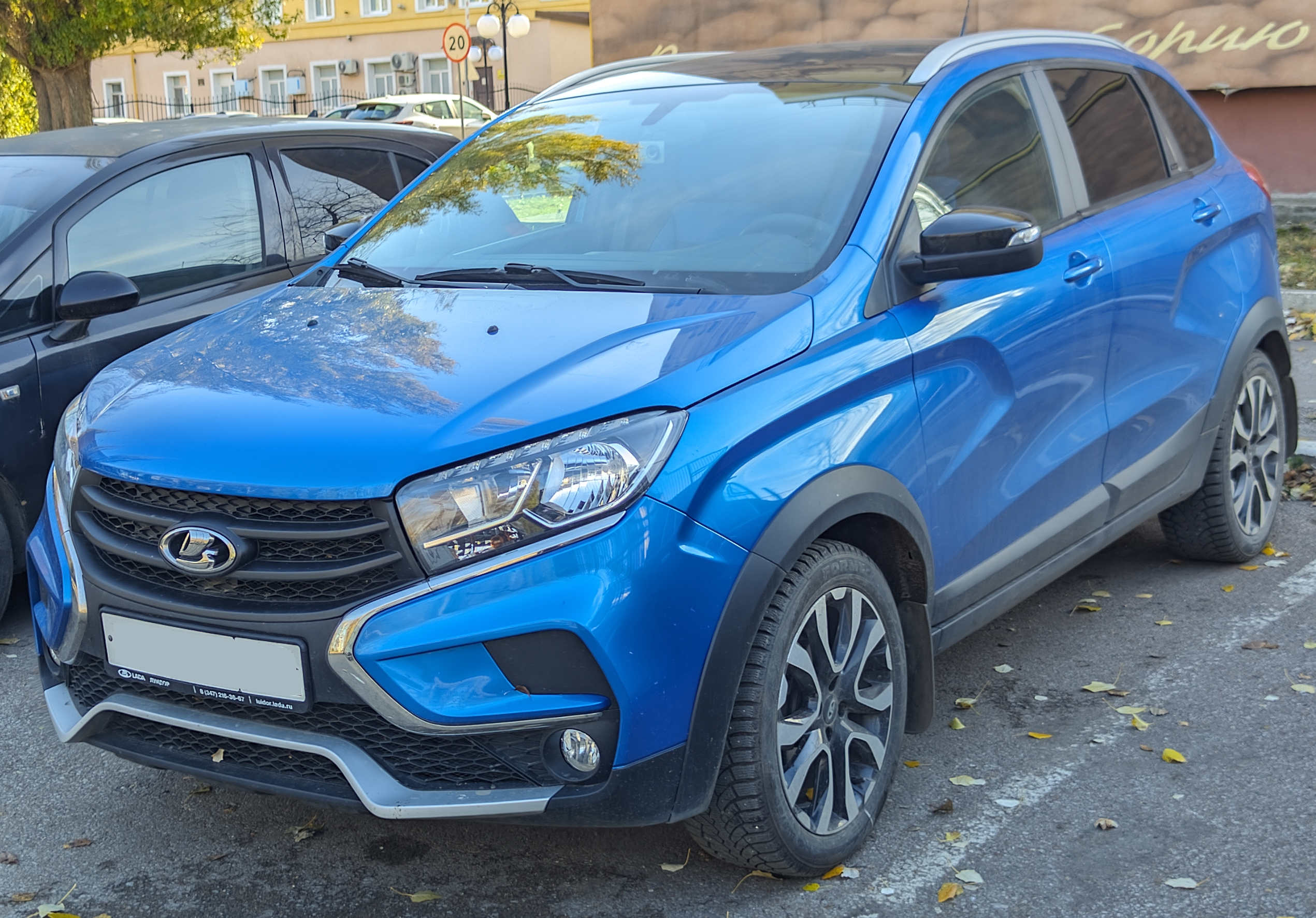
Lada XRAY Cross (facelift)

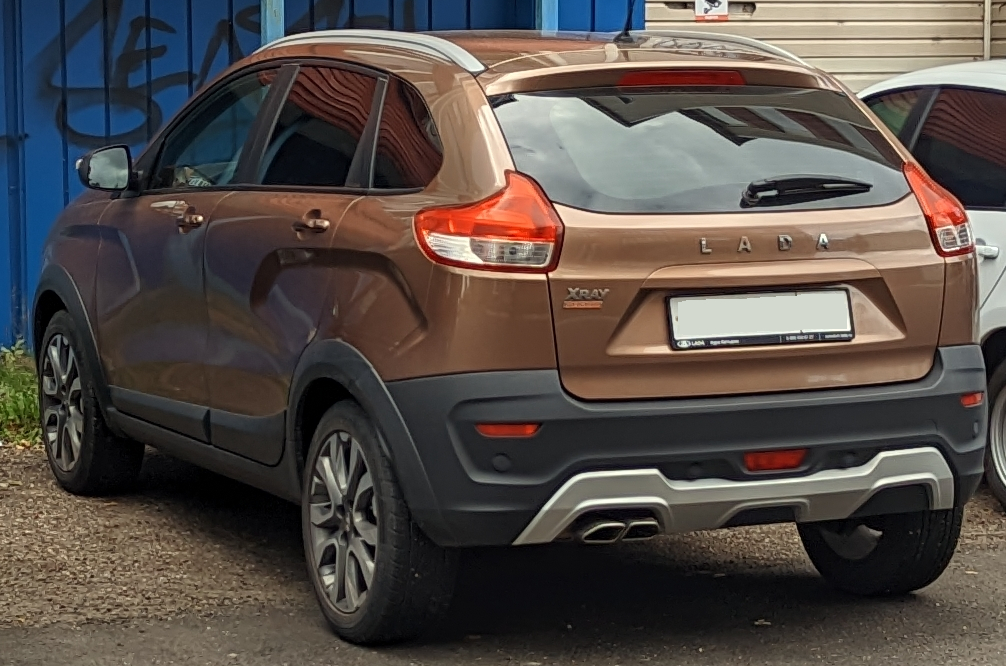
Lada XRAY Cross (rear view)

== Lada XRAY Concept (2012) ==
Lada XRAY
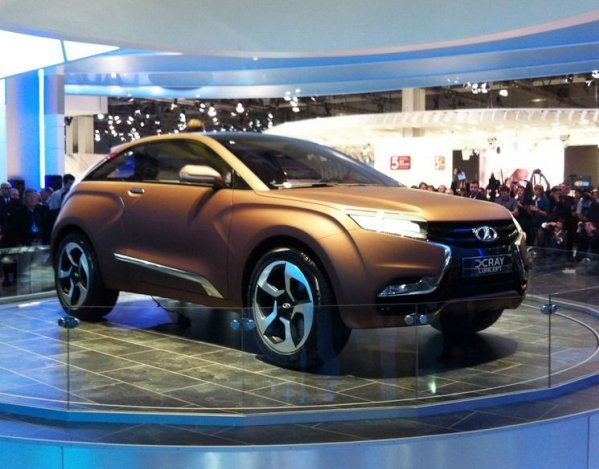

Overview
- Manufacturer: AvtoVAZ
- Production: 2012
- Designer: Steve Mattin

Body and chassis
- Class: crossover
- Body style: 3-door hatchback
- Layout: Front-engine, front-wheel-drive

Dimensions
- Length: 4,200 mm (165.4 in)

The prototype was produced by Vercarmodel Saro in Italy, at a cost of $1,000,000. The crossover receives an equally edgy styling complete with a leather coated seating arrangement, along with a futuristic dashboard and infotainment system. It has a stylish exterior, featuring a pair of long and thin headlights. The front grille bears a resemblance to an “X”.

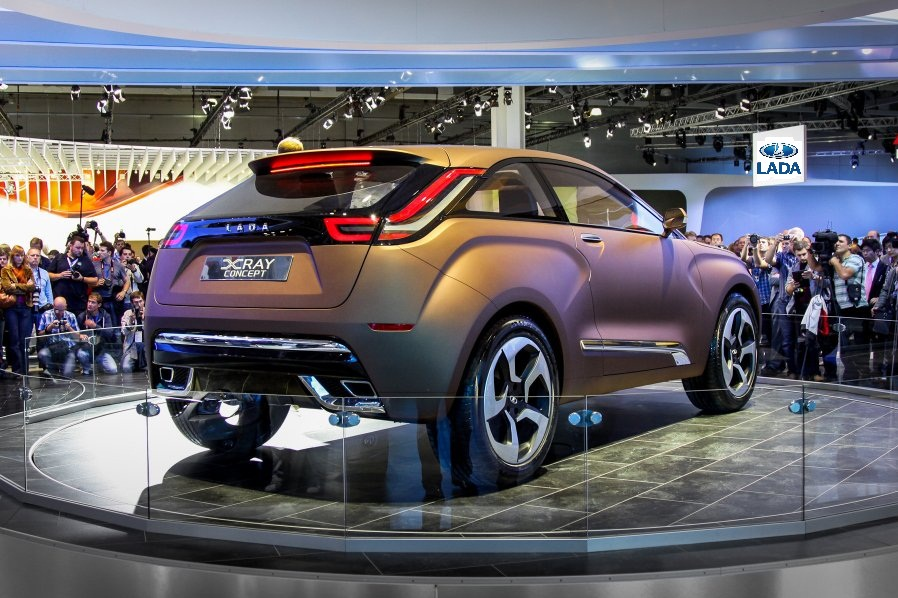
Lada XRAY — rear view, of the Moscow international automobile salon 2012

The name has two meanings: as an X-ray (a form of electromagnetic radiation) and as an abbreviation (X - crossover class, Recreation, Activity, Youth).

=== Reaction ===
According to Justin Cupler of TopSpeed, AvtoVAZ kept its Lada XRAY SUV under "such tight lock and key that it took all of us aback when it was debuted at the Moscow Motor Show". It was mentioned that Lada XRAY's cabin also continues the progressive design of the exterior.

== See also ==
- Lada Vesta
- Dacia Duster
