= Azimut =

Azimut may refer to:

- Azimut Holding, an Italian asset management company
- Azimut Hotels, a Russian hotel management company
- Azimut Yachts, an Italian yacht-manufacturing company
- Azimut (Alice album), 1982
- Azimut (Perigeo album), 1972
- Lada Azimut, a Russian compact crossover SUV

== See also ==
- Azimuth
