= Lada Vesta =

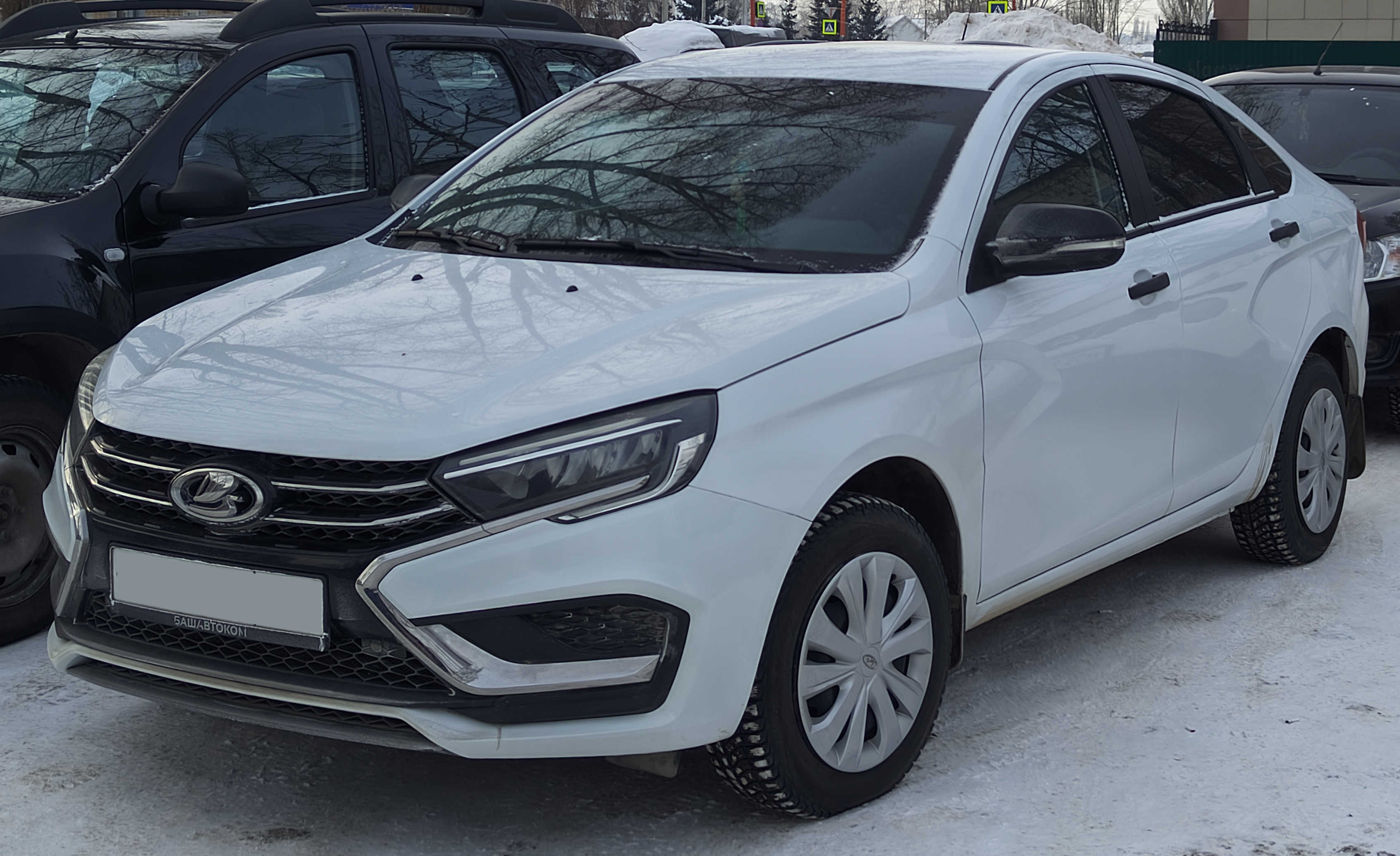
- 2025 Lada Vesta sedan (facelift)

Overview
- Manufacturer: Lada (AvtoVAZ)
- Also called: Lada Aura (LWB version)
- Production: 2015 – present
- Assembly: Russia: Izhevsk (Lada Izhevsk)

Body and chassis
- Class: Compact car (C)
- Body style: 4-door saloon 5-door estate
- Layout: Front-engine, front-wheel-drive
- Platform: Lada B/C
- Related: Lada Aura; Lada Granta; Lada Iskra

Powertrain
- Engine: 1.6 L VAZ 21129 I4; 1.8 L VAZ 21179 I4
- Transmission: 5-speed manual; 5-speed automated manual; CVT

Dimensions
- Wheelbase: 2,635 mm (103.7 in)
- Length: 4,410 mm (173.6 in)
- Width: 1,764 mm (69.4 in)
- Height: 1,497 mm (58.9 in)
- Curb weight: 1,230–1,270 kg (2,711.7–2,799.9 lb)

Chronology
- Predecessor: Lada Priora

The Lada Vesta is a compact car produced by the Russian car company AvtoVAZ since 2015. It was presented in August 2014 during the Moscow International Automobile Salon and went into mass production on 25 September 2015 in Izhevsk.

== Overview ==
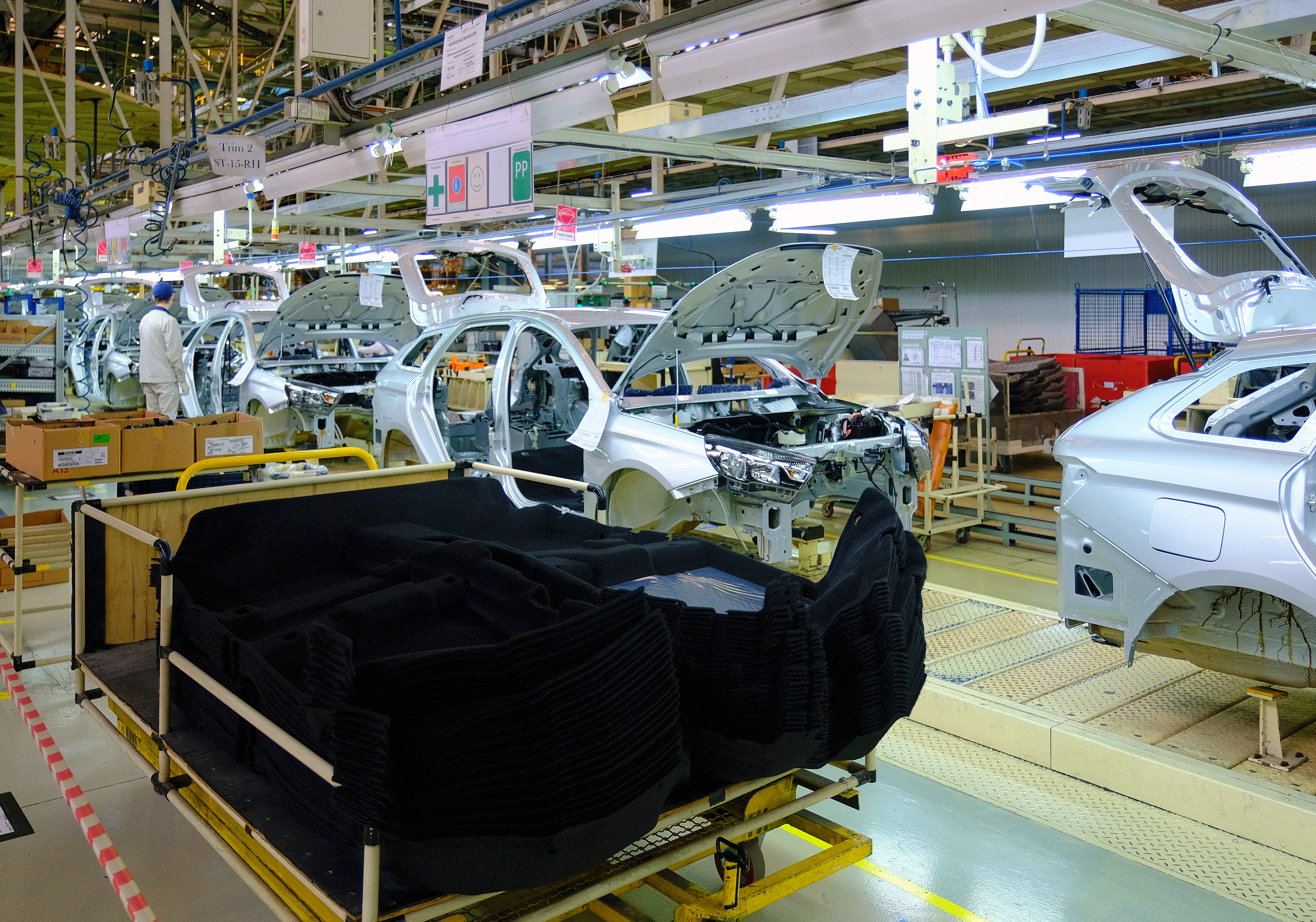
The Lada Izhevsk plant where the Vesta is produced

Bo Andersson, President and CEO of AvtoVAZ, was responsible for improving overall operations and quality at AvtoVAZ, enabling the Lada Vesta – AvtoVAZ' first completely new platform in several years – to launch on-time and with the highest crash safety rating in its class.

Within days after the Lada Vesta went on sale in November, it became one of the best-selling cars in the Russian market. In 2018, Lada Vesta became the Best Selling Car in Russia.

Lada introduced a station wagon and a "Cross" version of the station wagon, with higher ground clearance, in September 2017. A "Cross" version of the sedan, with more ground clearance than a Toyota RAV4, arrived in the first half of 2018.

In September 2022, the president of Lada, Maxim Sokolov, announced the creation of two new Lada models, one of them to be a crossover on the Vesta built on the Lada B/C platform of Renault conception, and the other a separate Lada family of compact cars "on a global platform". The new Vesta would be the first new model to be launched after the transition of Vesta production from Izhevsk to Togliatti.

== Technical details ==
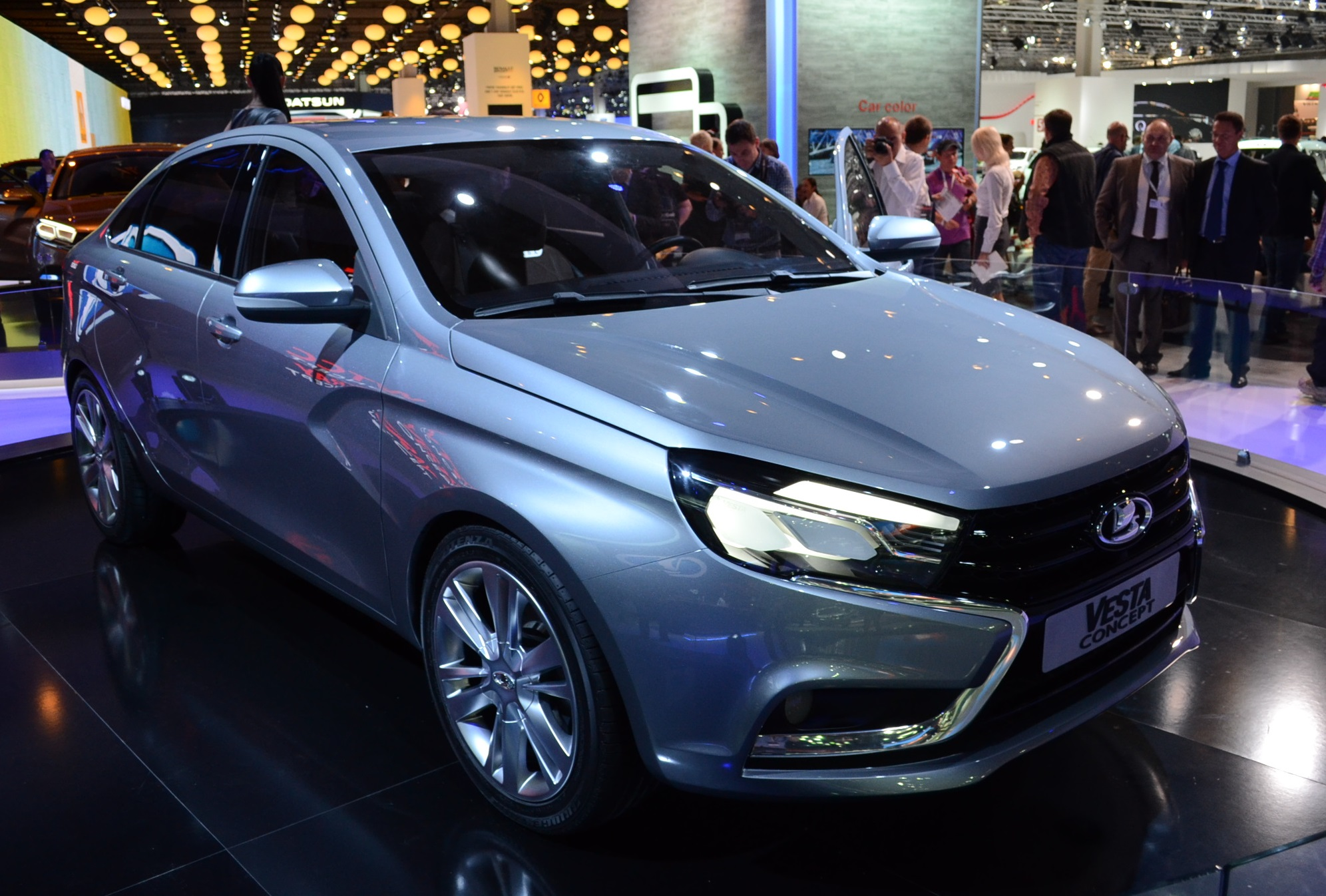
Lada Vesta Concept

As standard, the car has an airbag, anti-lock braking system with brake assist, electronic brakeforce distribution (EBD), electronic stability control, traction control system, hill start assistant, ERA-GLONASS emergency system, tilt/telescoping adjustable steering column, remote controlled car central locking system with folding key, trip computer, car alarm, 15 or 16-inch wheels and full-size spare tyre, making it one of the most equipped models in the entry-level segment in Russia. The Lada Vesta gets side airbags in 2016.

Production of the Vesta started on 25 September 2015 at AvtoVAZ's Izhevsk manufacturing site. The first mass production Lada Vesta was a car of the Comfort trim-level, equipped with a 1.6-litre engine and a manual transmission. Sales started on 25 November 2015. The car is one of the carmaker's flagship models.

A variant of the Vesta, called the Lada Vesta CNG, has a modification that allows using two types of fuel: compressed natural gas (methane) and gasoline.

The Lada Vesta is sold on Russian, Azerbaijani and Kazakhstani markets. AvtoVAZ also commenced Vesta exports to the European Union, to countries such as Germany, Austria, Hungary and Slovakia in early 2017. The sale of the SW and Cross versions started a year later. The EU-spec Lada Vesta meets Euro 6 emissions standards and offers additional safety equipment. Only the 1.6-litre engine was sold in the EU. Exports to the European Union ended after Russia's invasion of Ukraine.

== Packages ==
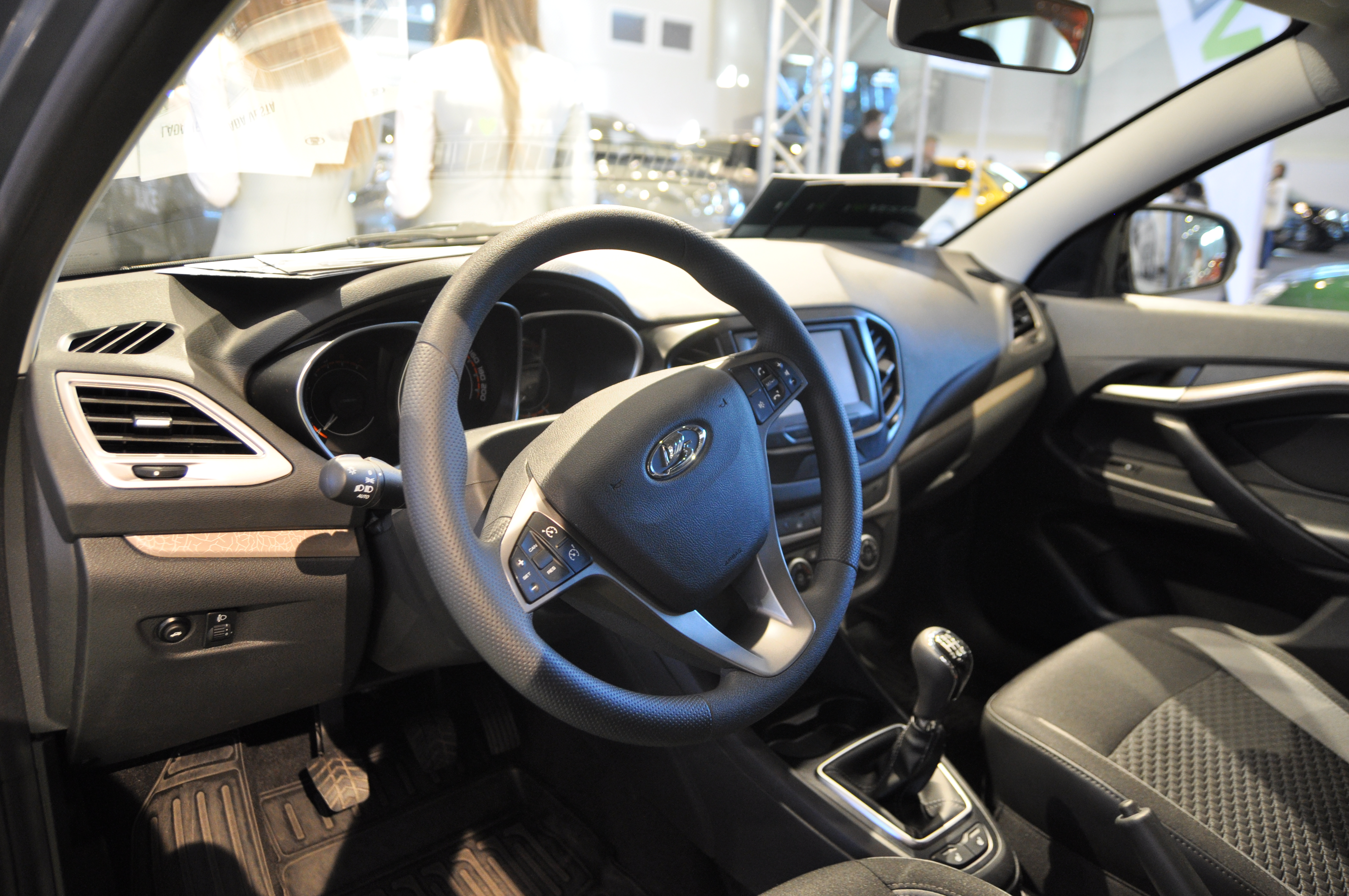
Interior

The Vesta was formerly available in three basic complete sets - base Classic, average Comfort and top Luxe. In all trim levels, there are options. For the complete set of Classic - Start, for Comfort - Multimedia and Image, for Luxe - Multimedia.

Lada's newest Prestige option, which includes the Multimedia package and 5 additional items of equipment that increase the comfort of the driver and passengers. These include a folding rear armrest with cup holders. To recharge the gadgets the passengers will be helped by a power USB socket in the central armrest, which is located between the front seats. On the same armrest are the controls for heating the rear seats and tinted rear windows. Also, the Prestige package provides atmospheric illumination of the interior: several LEDs are located in the niches of the feet of the front passengers, on the console and on the upholstery of the doors. Integral equipment LADA Vesta in the maximum configuration with the package Prestige - multimedia system with navigation (7-inch color display with Touchscreen, FM / AM with RDS, USB, SD card, AUX, Bluetooth, Hands free, 6 speakers), on the screen which displays the image from the rear view camera. The Prestige package is available for LADA Vesta sedans in the Luxe package with the following power units: 1.6-liter manual transmission (from 746,900 rubles), 1.8-liter manual transmission (from 781,900 rubles) and 1.8-liter automated manual transmission (AMT) (806,900 rubles).

The 1.6-liter engine produces 106 hp (78 kW), while the larger 1.8 has 122 hp (90 kW).

== Variants ==
=== Sedan ===
- Vesta Sedan - 5-seat passenger sedan.
- Vesta Cross - 5-seat passenger cross-country sedan.
- Vesta Sport - 5-seat passenger sedan with factory tuned 145-horsepower engine. The official premiere will be held at the Moscow International Automobile Salon, which opens on 29 August 2018 in the Crocus Expo complex.
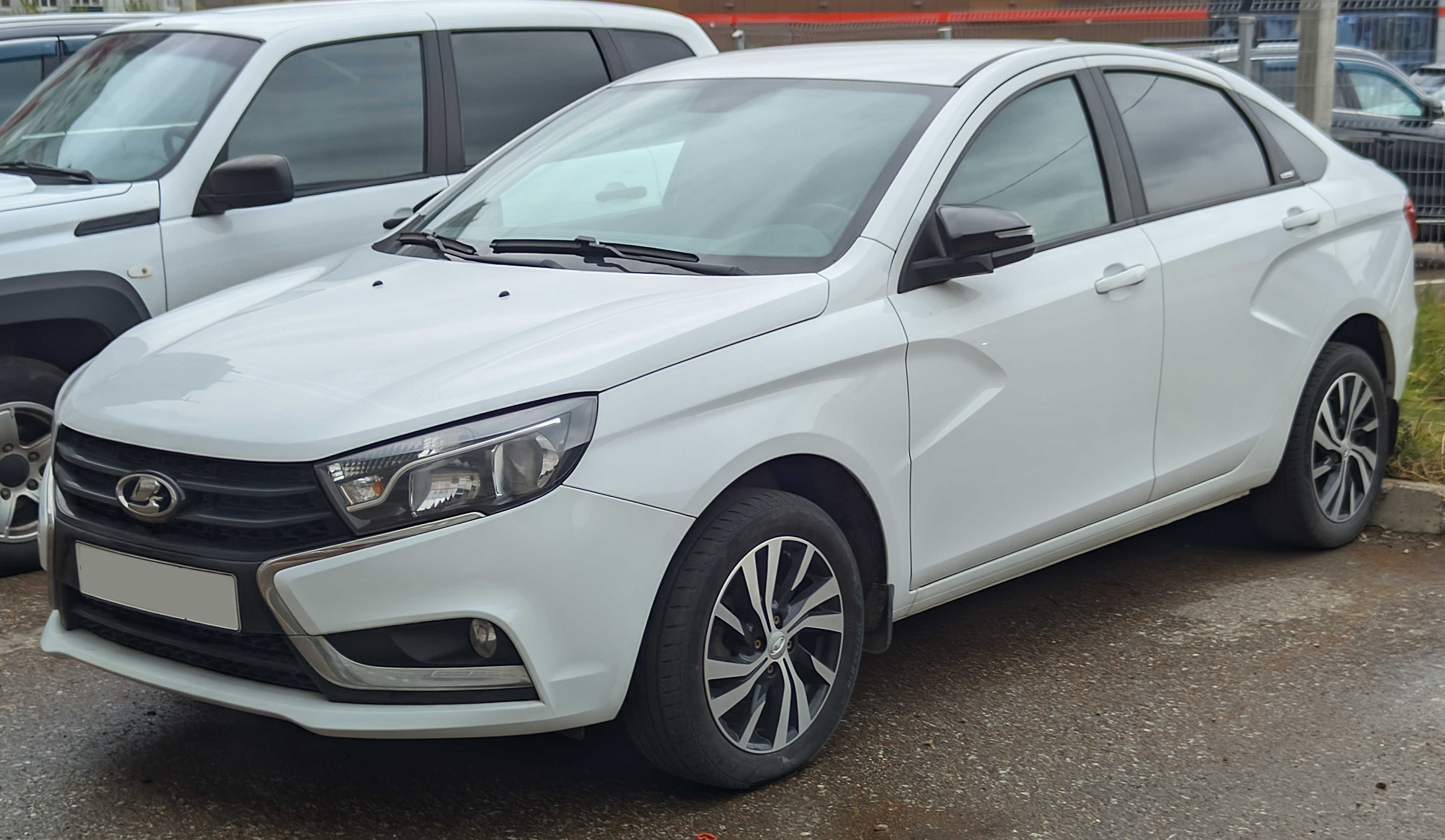
Lada Vesta Sedan (pre-facelift)

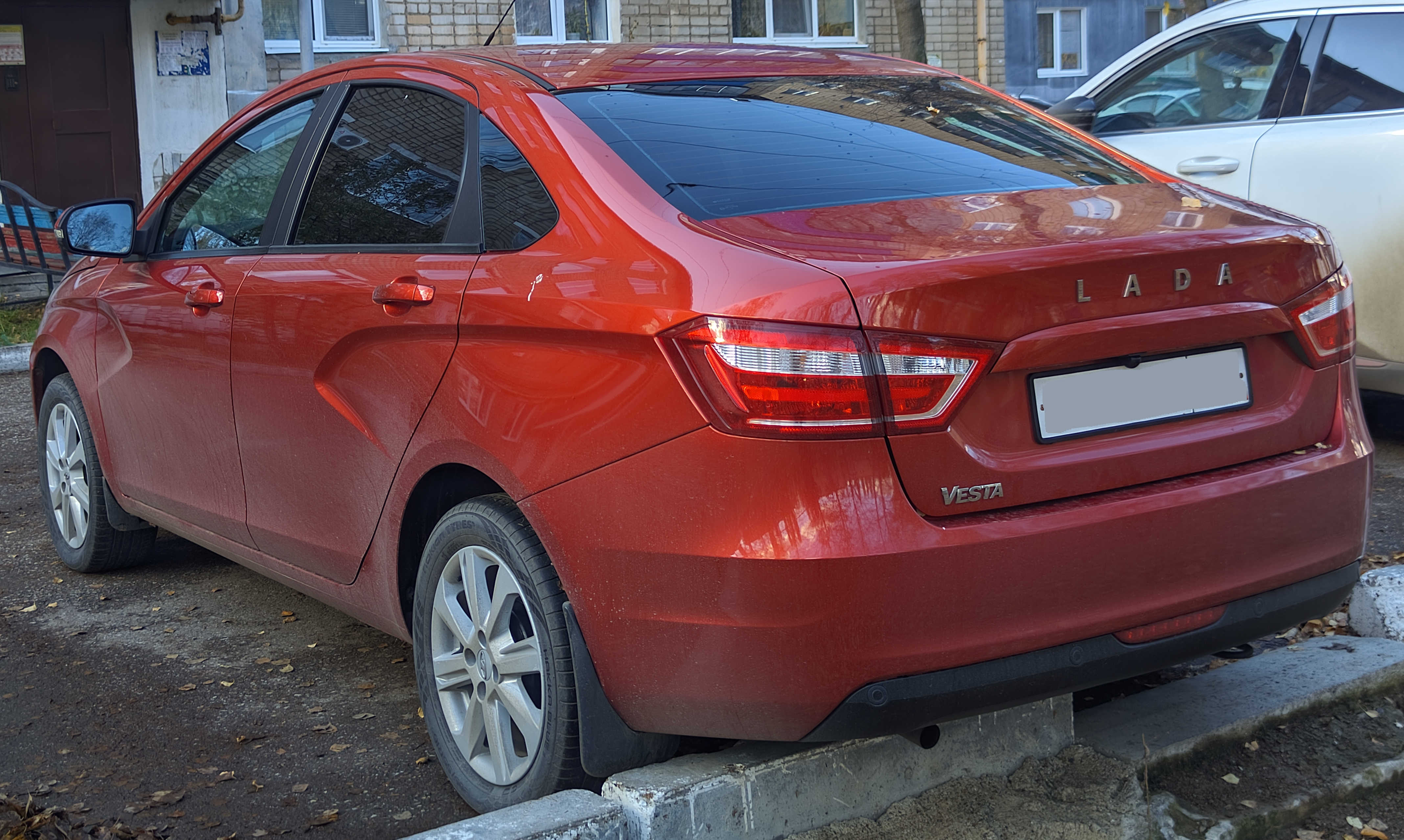
Rear view (pre-facelift)

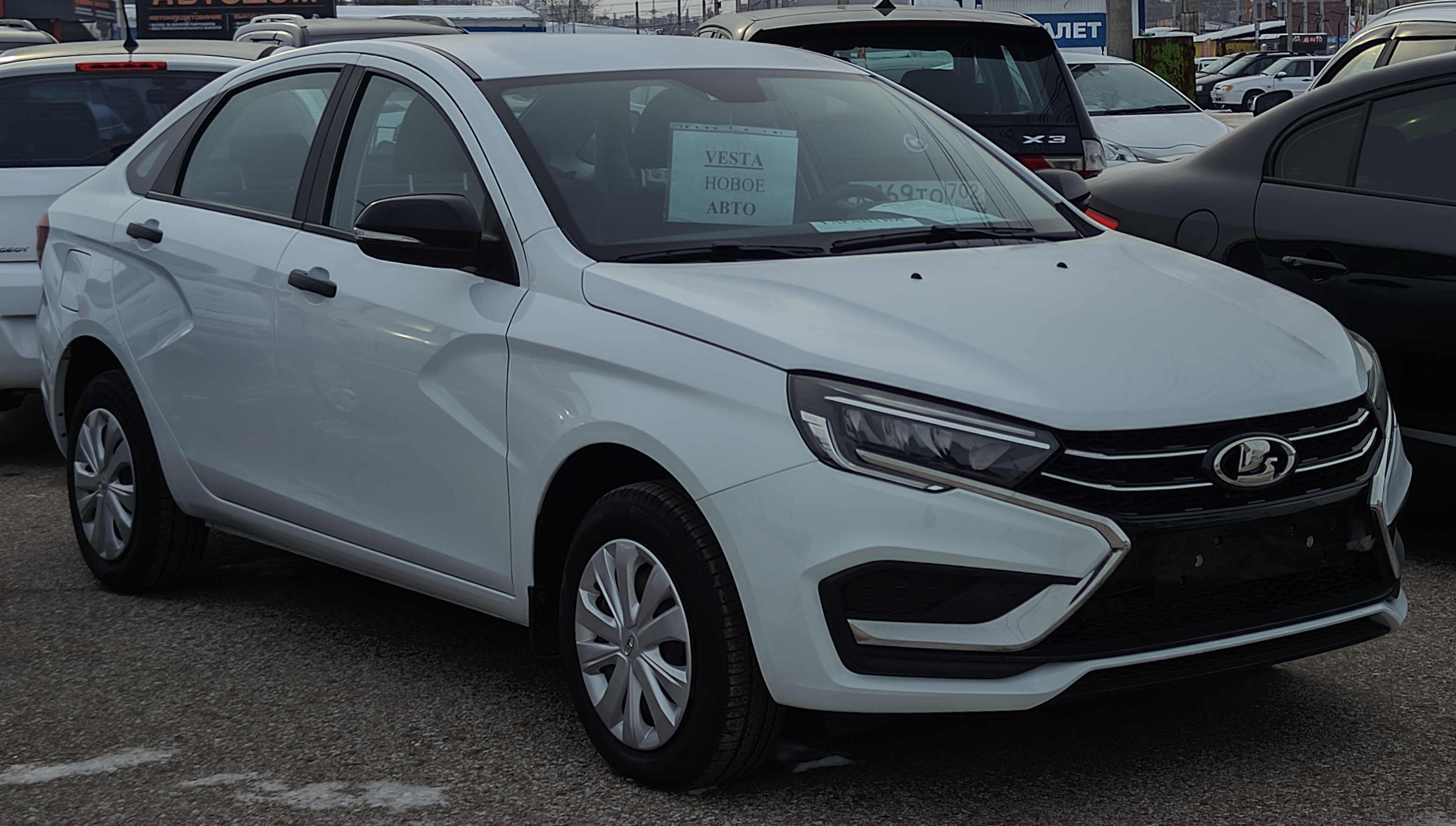
Lada Vesta Sedan (facelift)

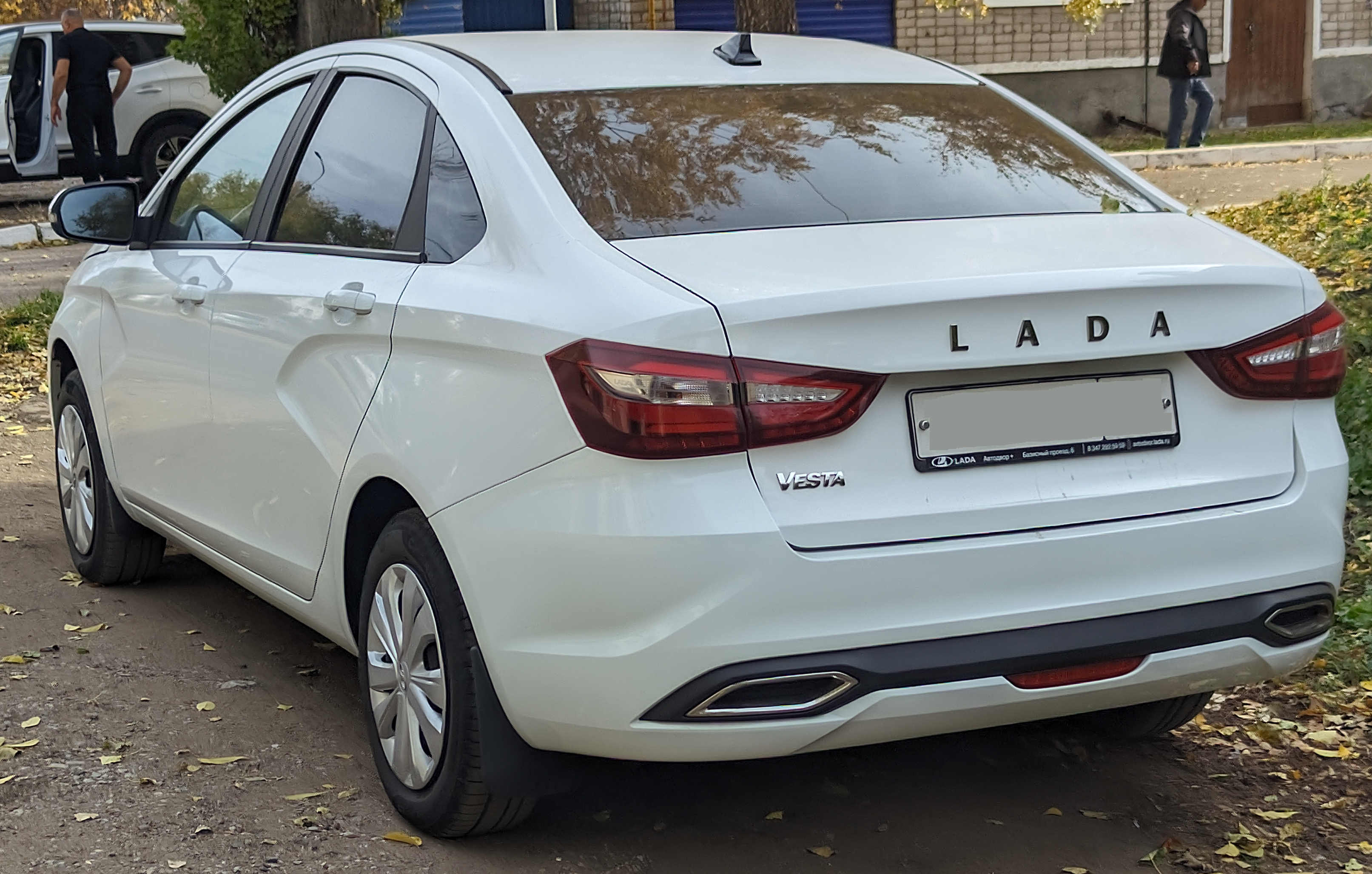
Rear view (facelift)

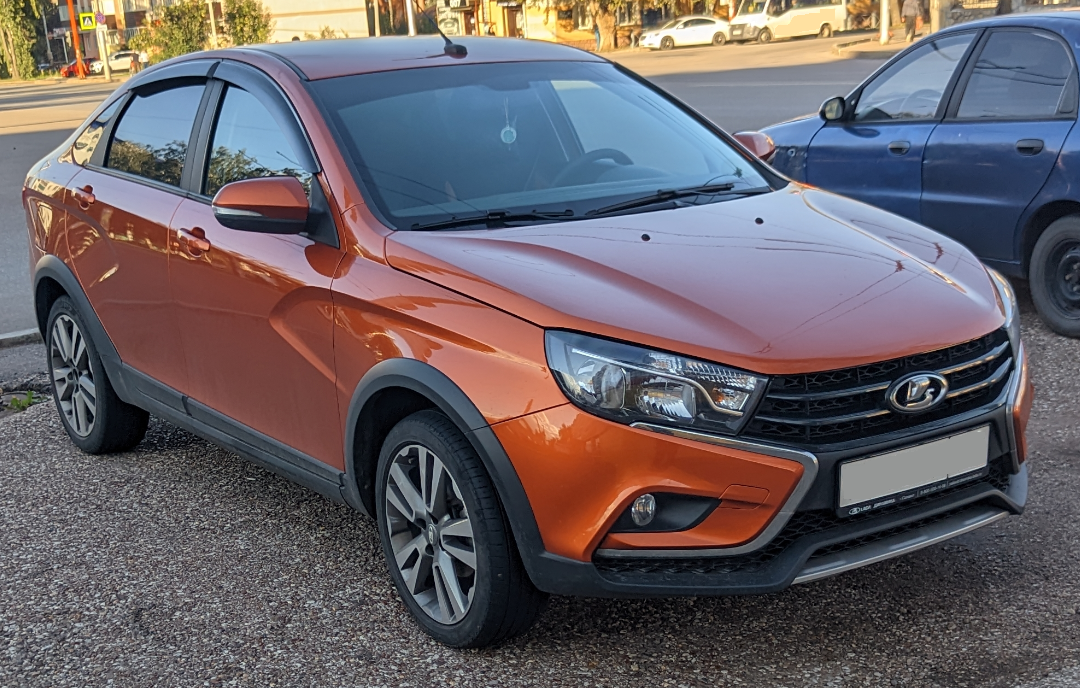
Lada Vesta Cross (pre-facelift)

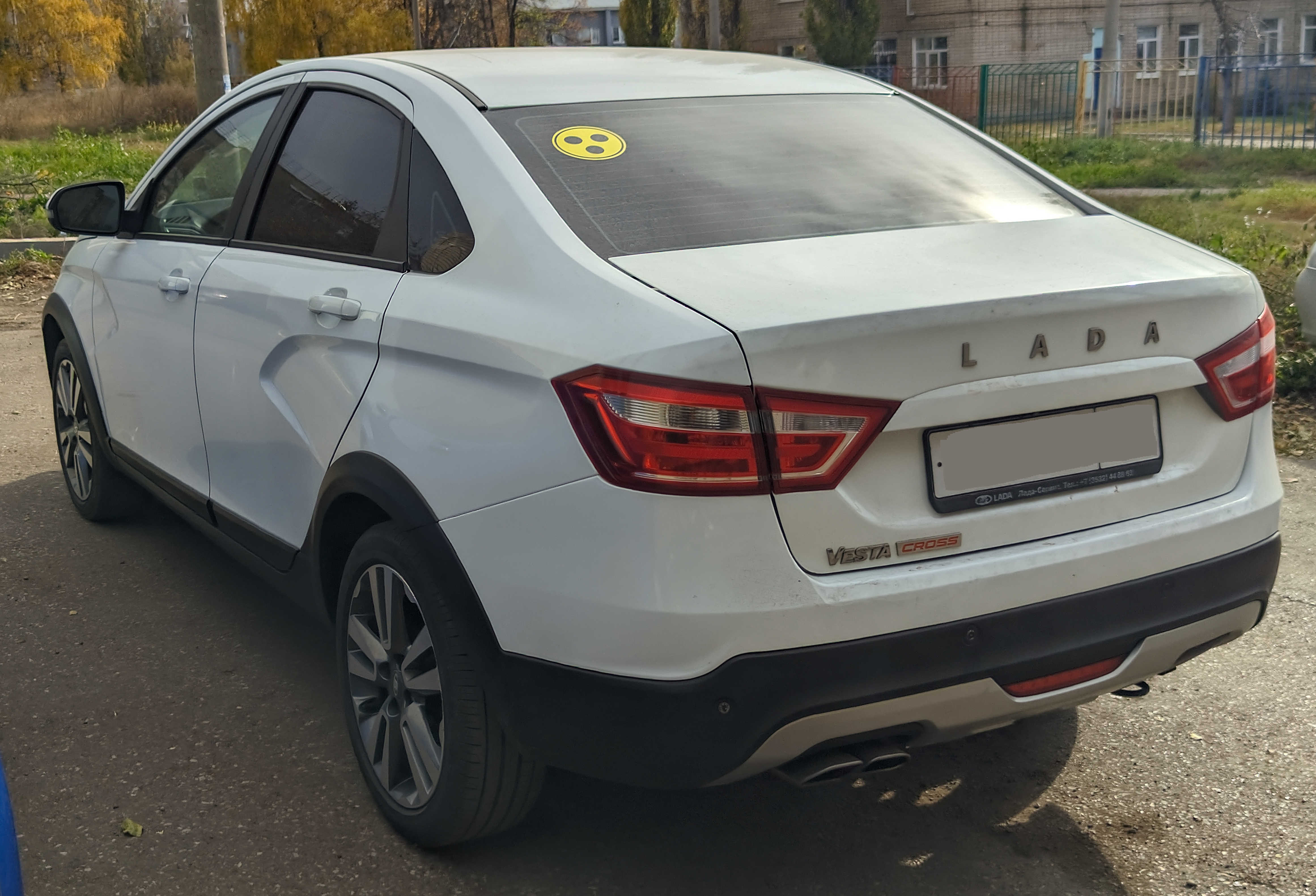
Rear view (pre-facelift)

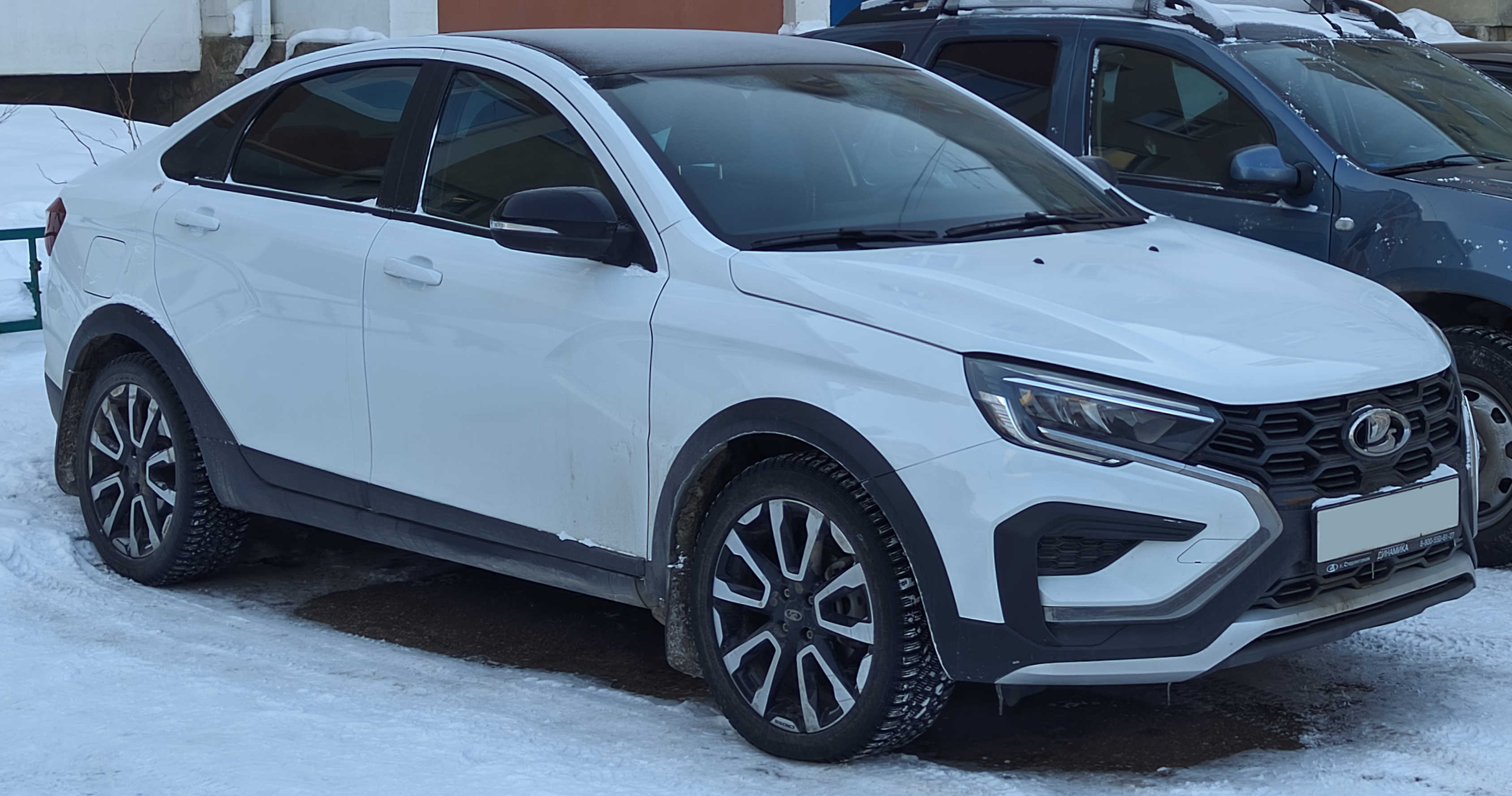
Lada Vesta Cross (facelift)

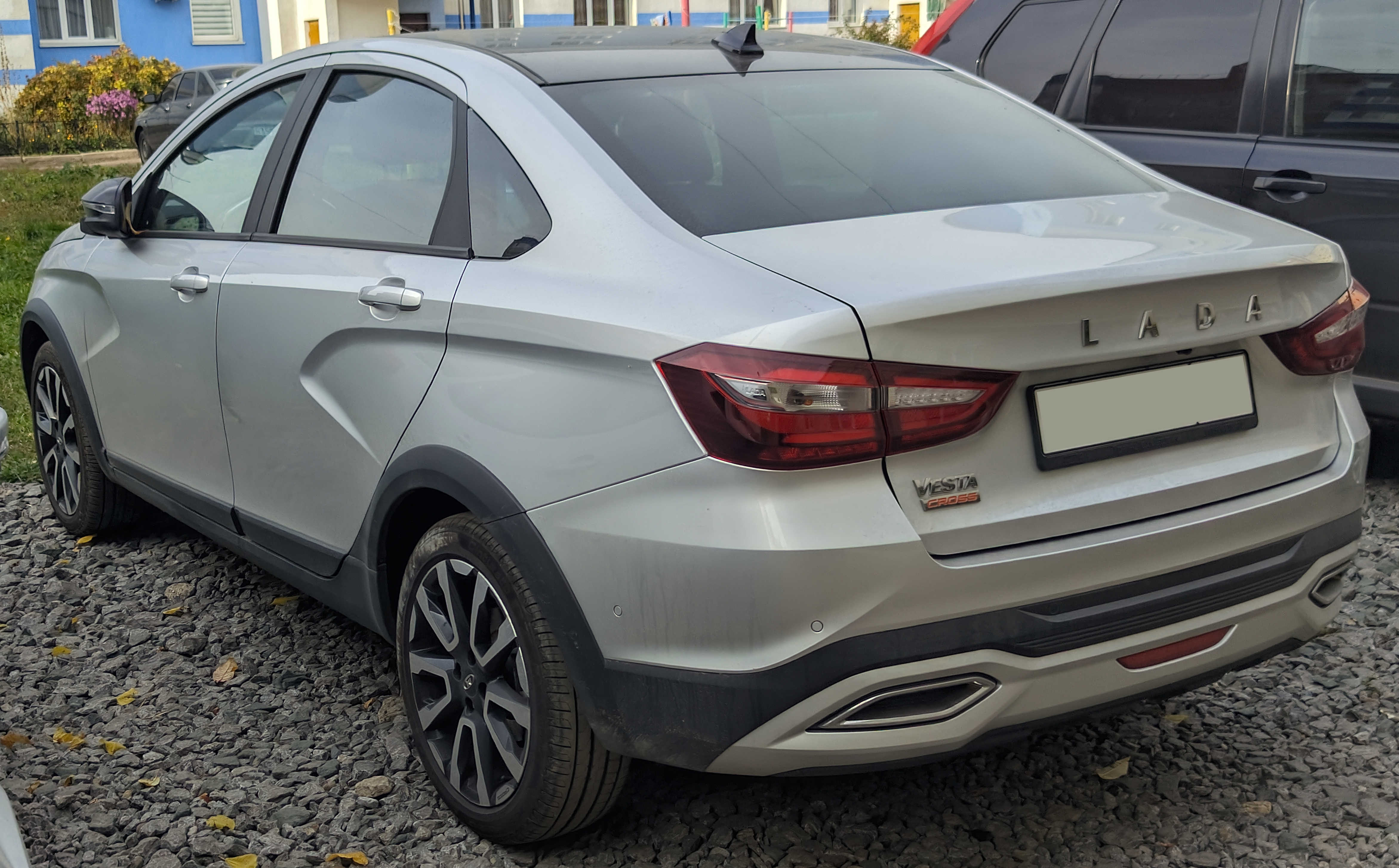
Rear view (facelift)

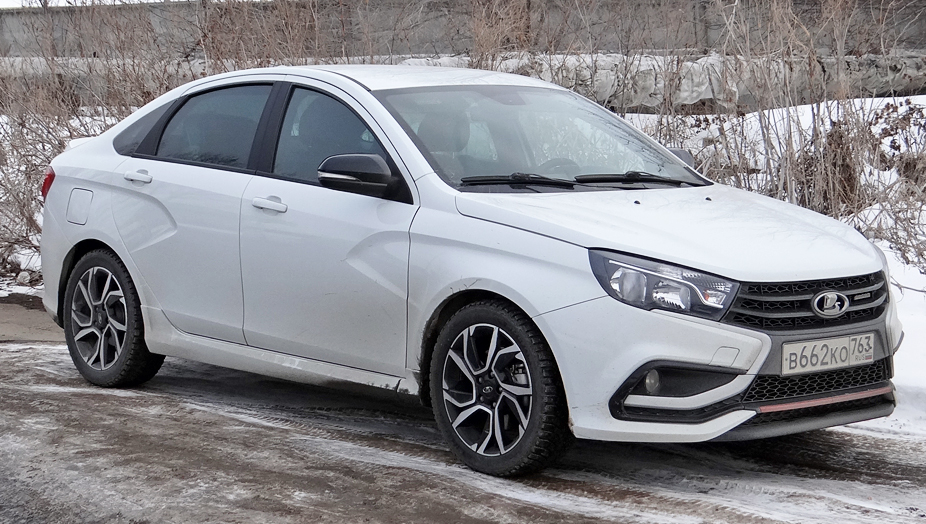
Lada Vesta Sport (pre-facelift)

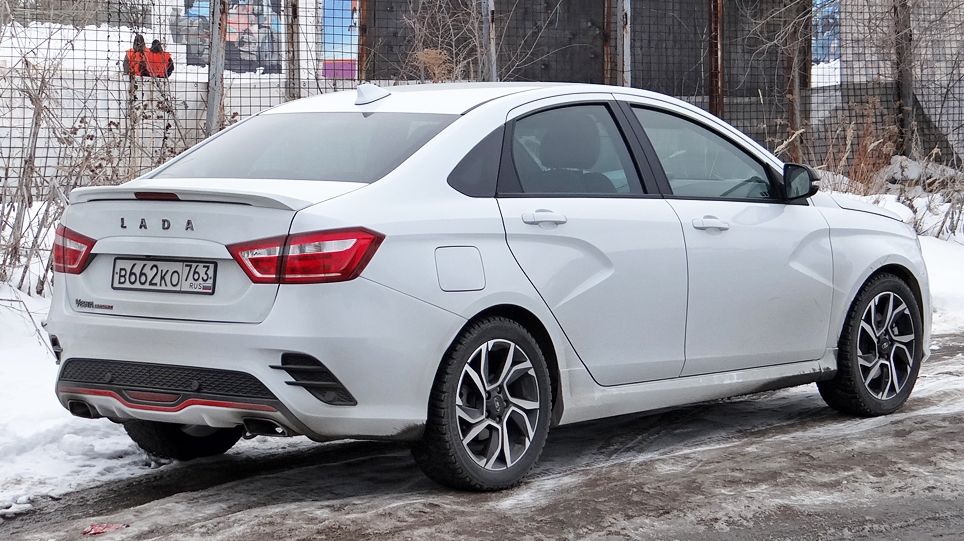
Rear view (pre-facelift)

=== Station Wagon ===
- Vesta SW - 5-seat station wagon.
- Vesta SW Cross - 5-seat off-road wagon.
- Vesta SW Sport - 5-seat passenger station wagon.
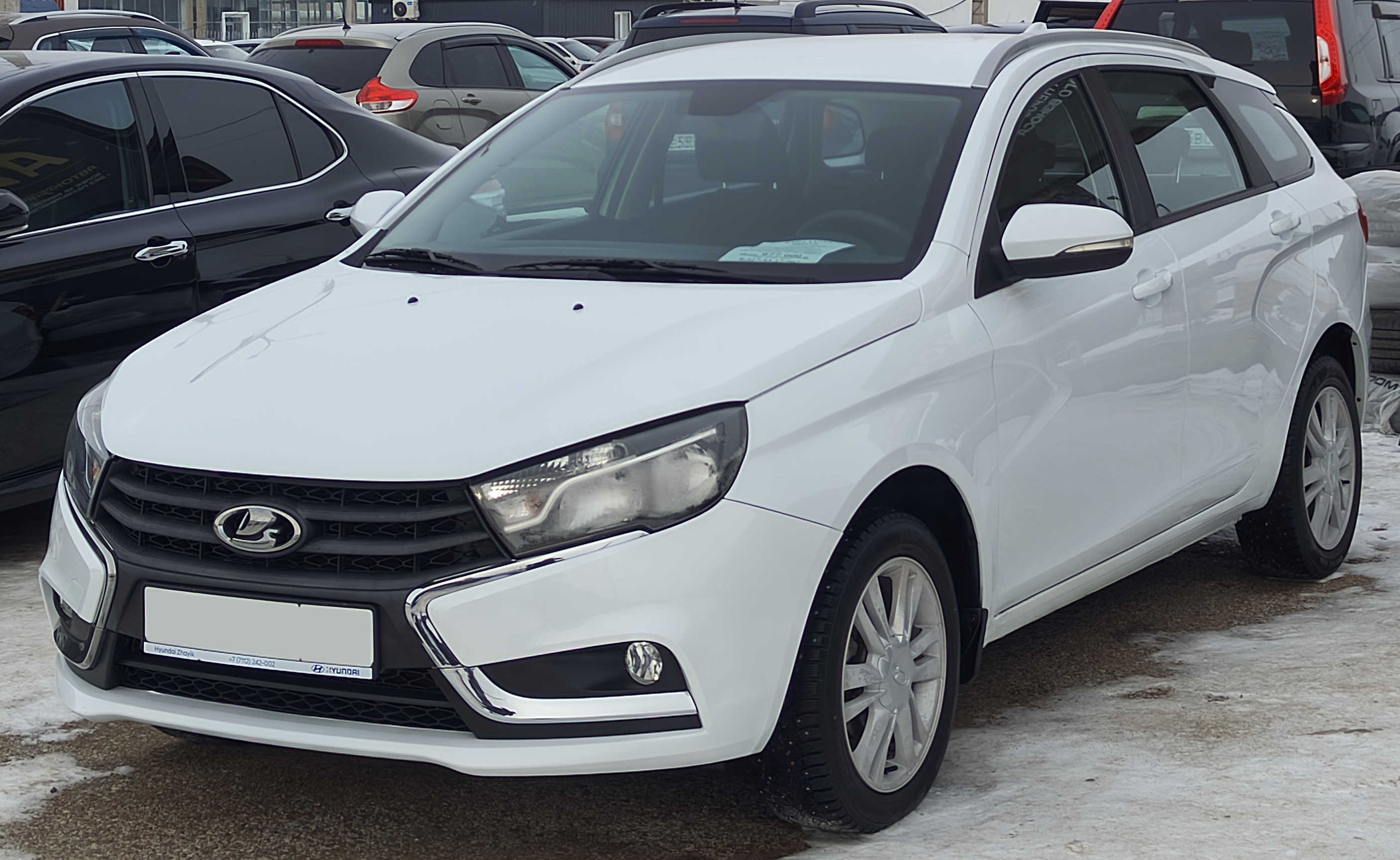
Lada Vesta SW (pre-facelift)

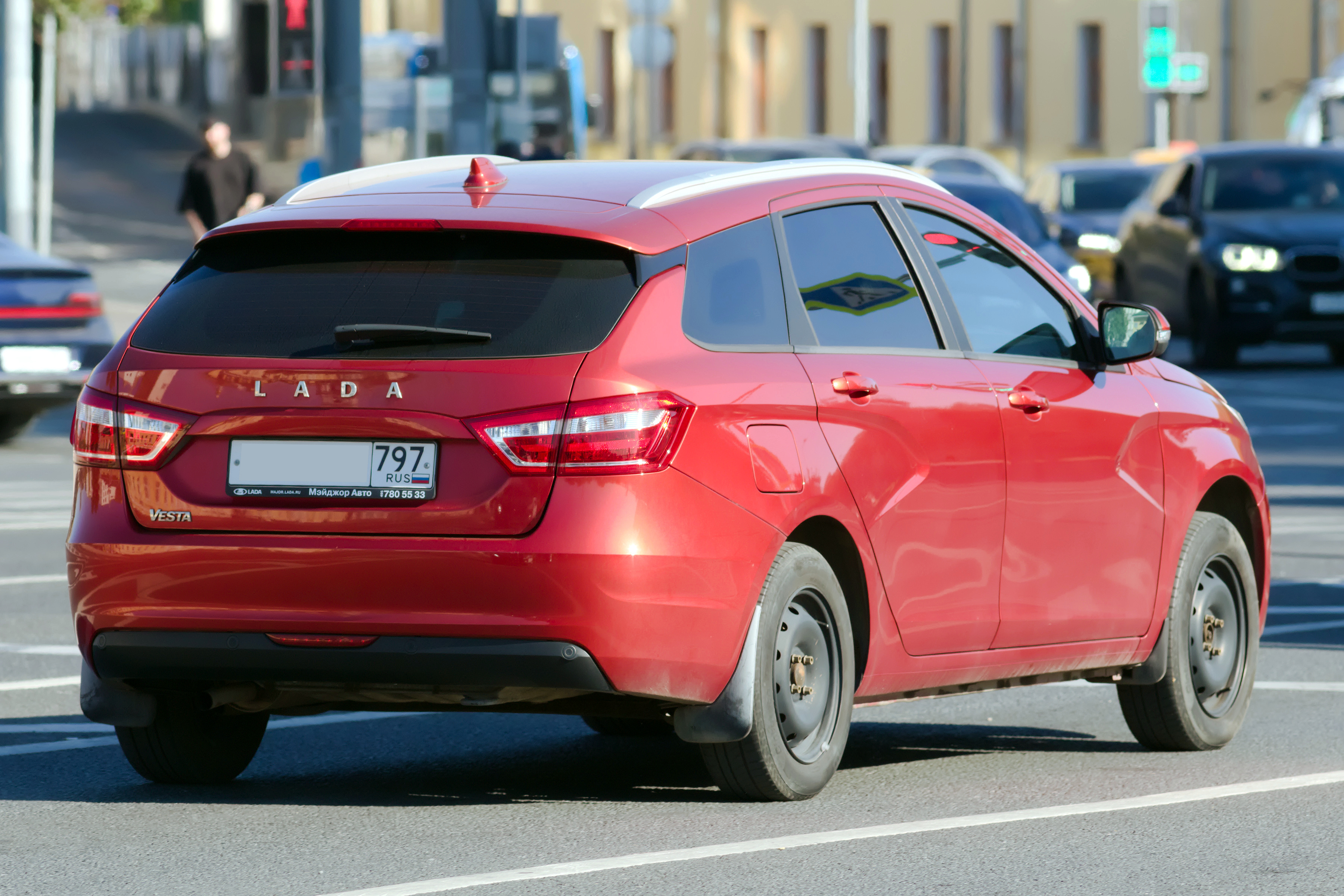
Rear view (pre-facelift)

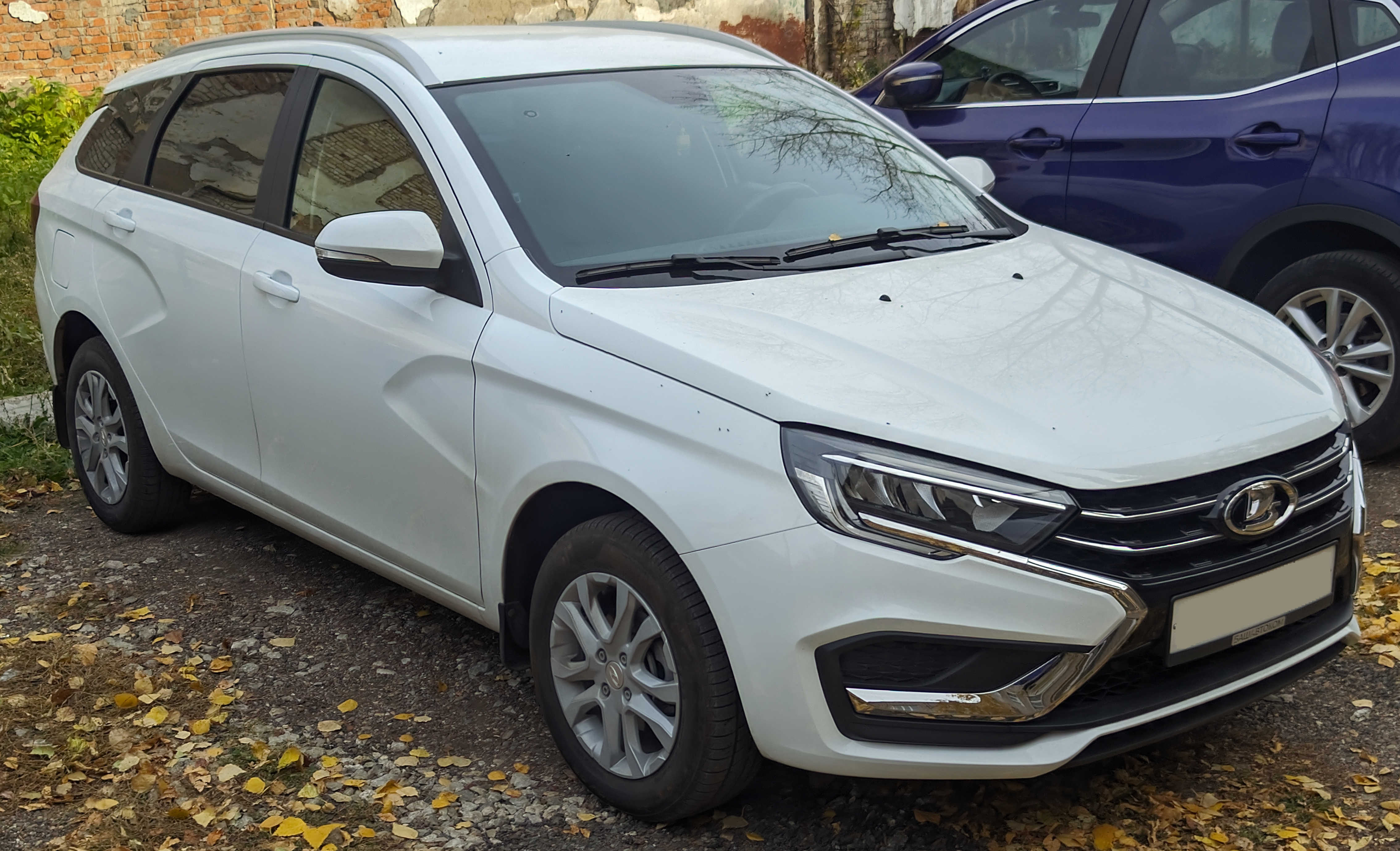
Lada Vesta SW (front view; facelift)

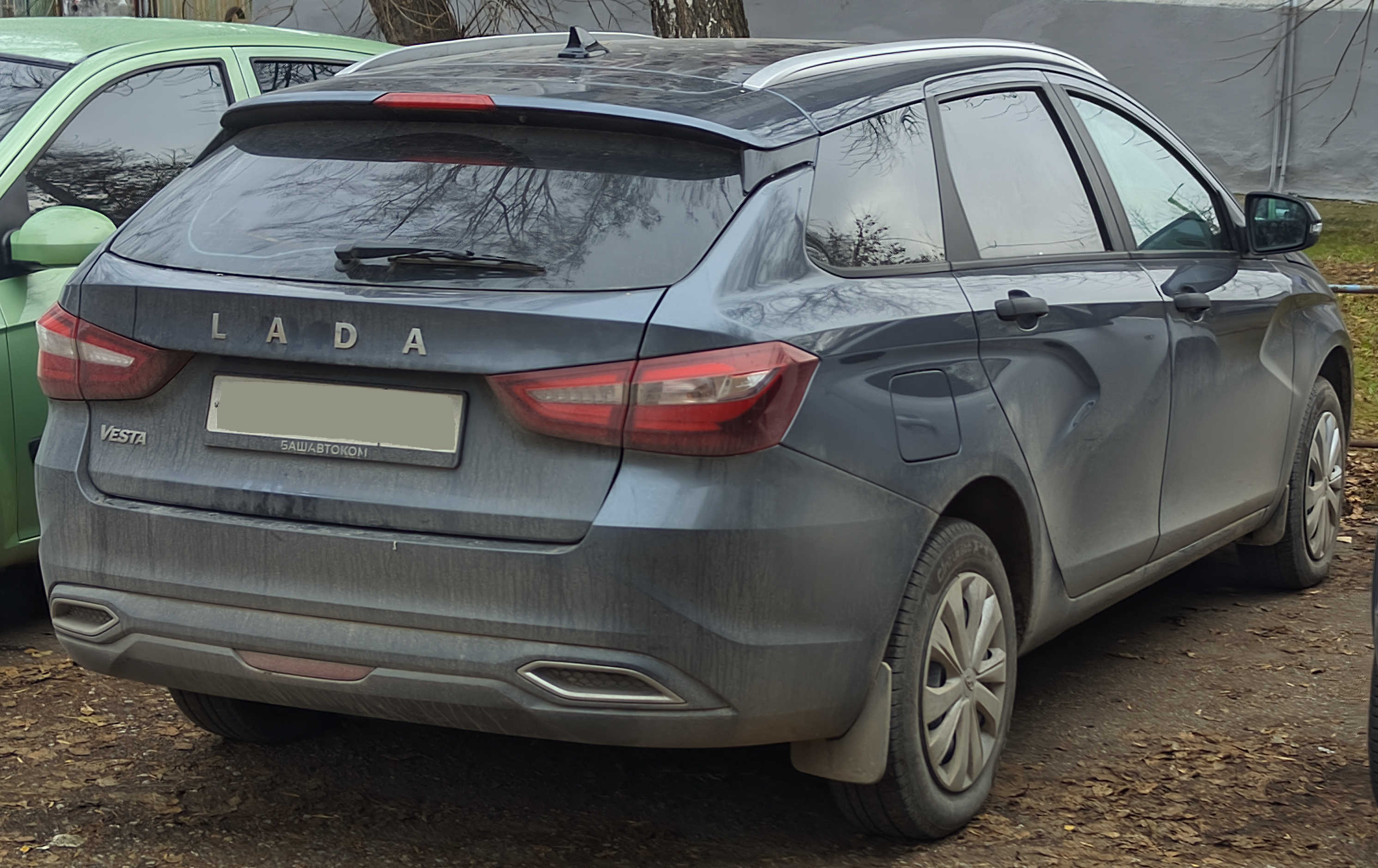
Rear view (facelift)

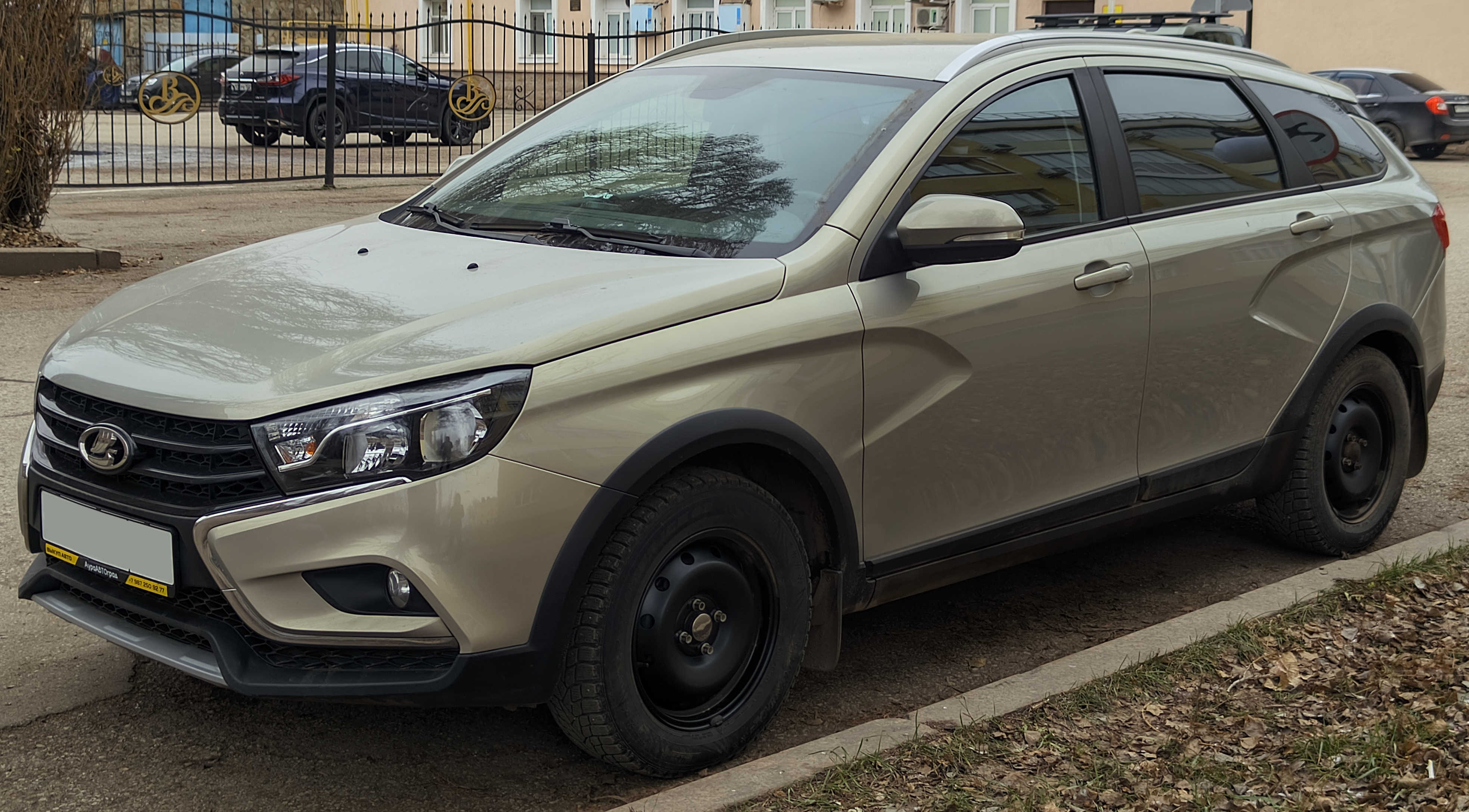
Lada Vesta SW Cross (pre-facelift)

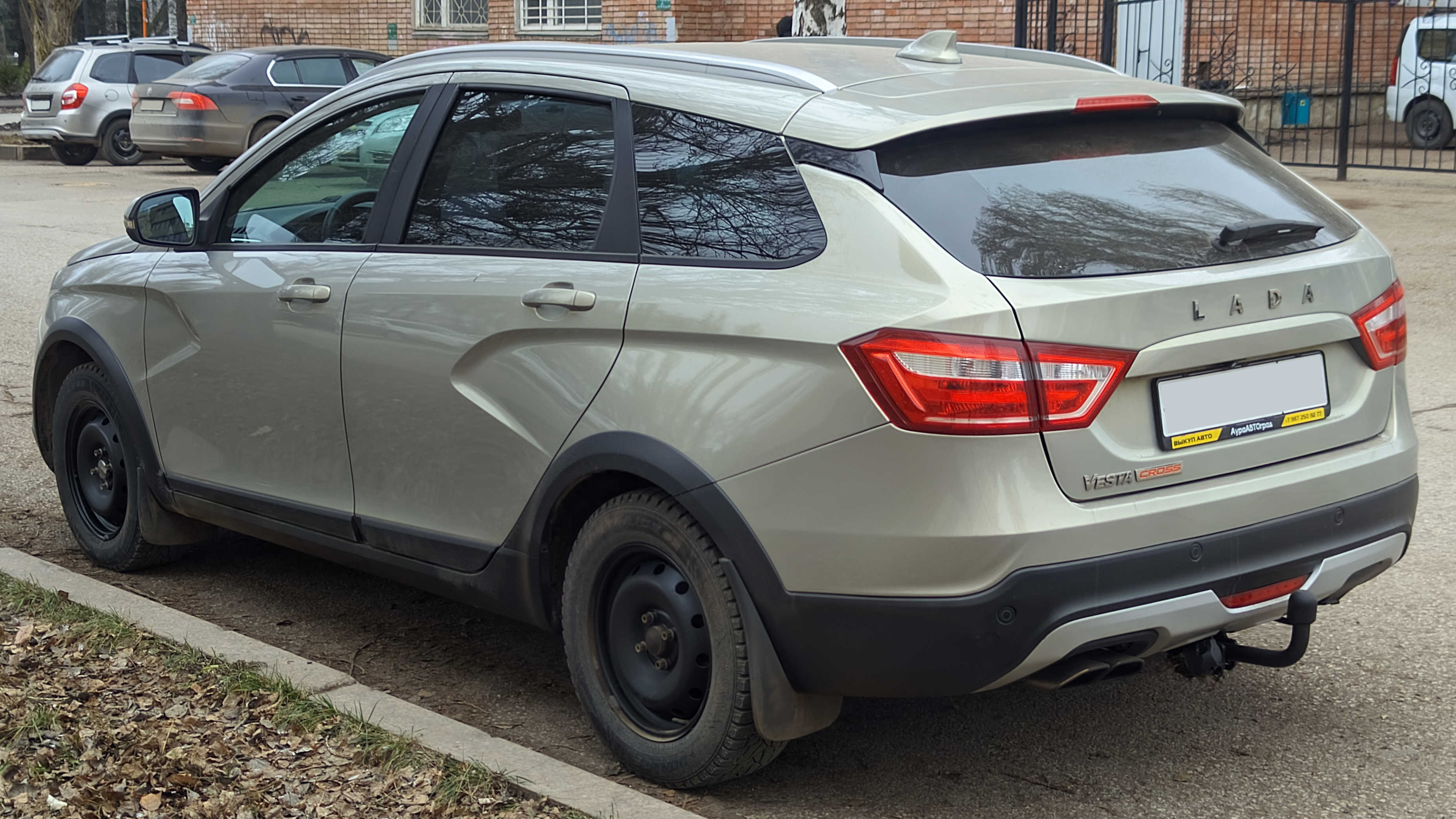
Rear view (pre-facelift)

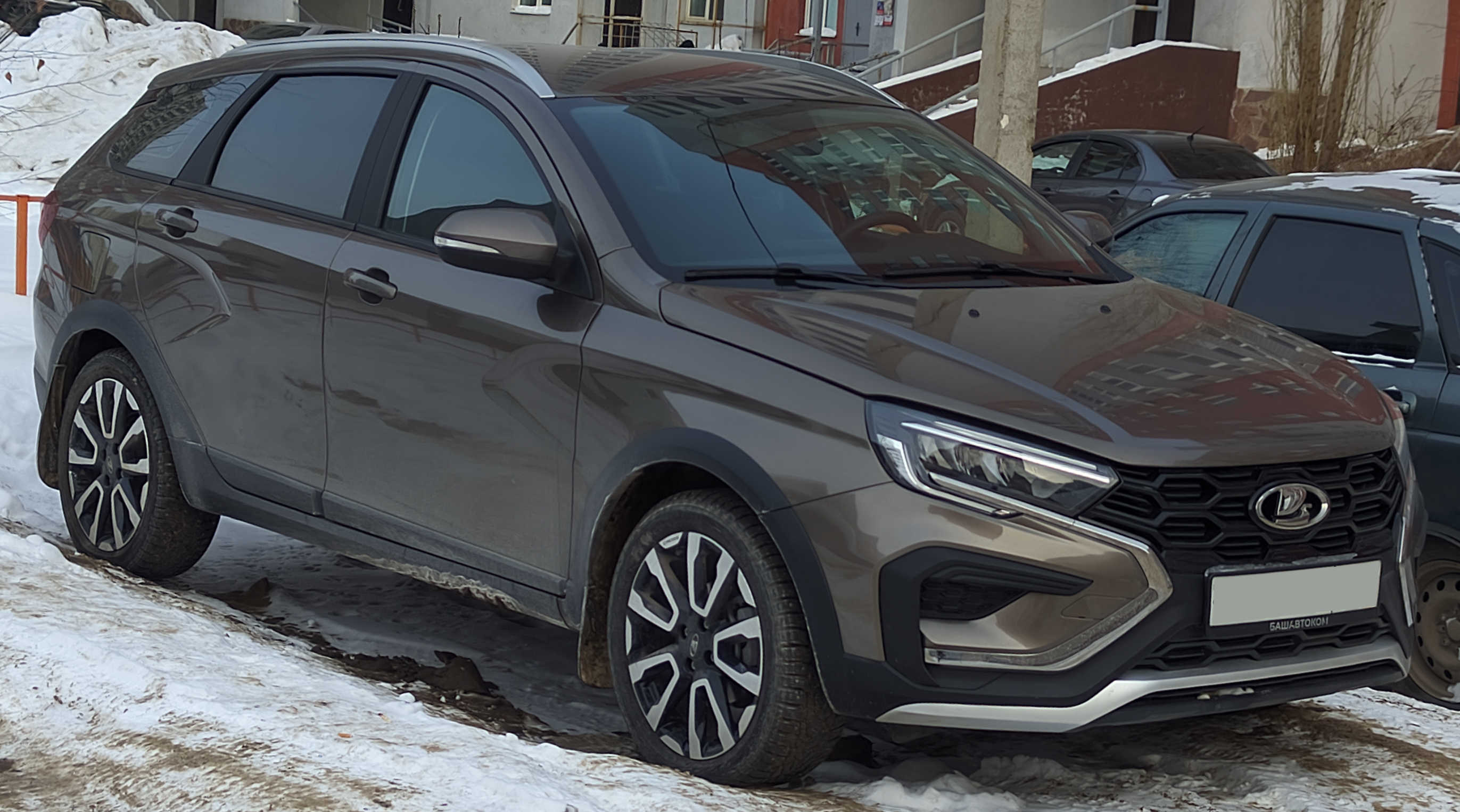
Lada Vesta SW Cross (front view; facelift)

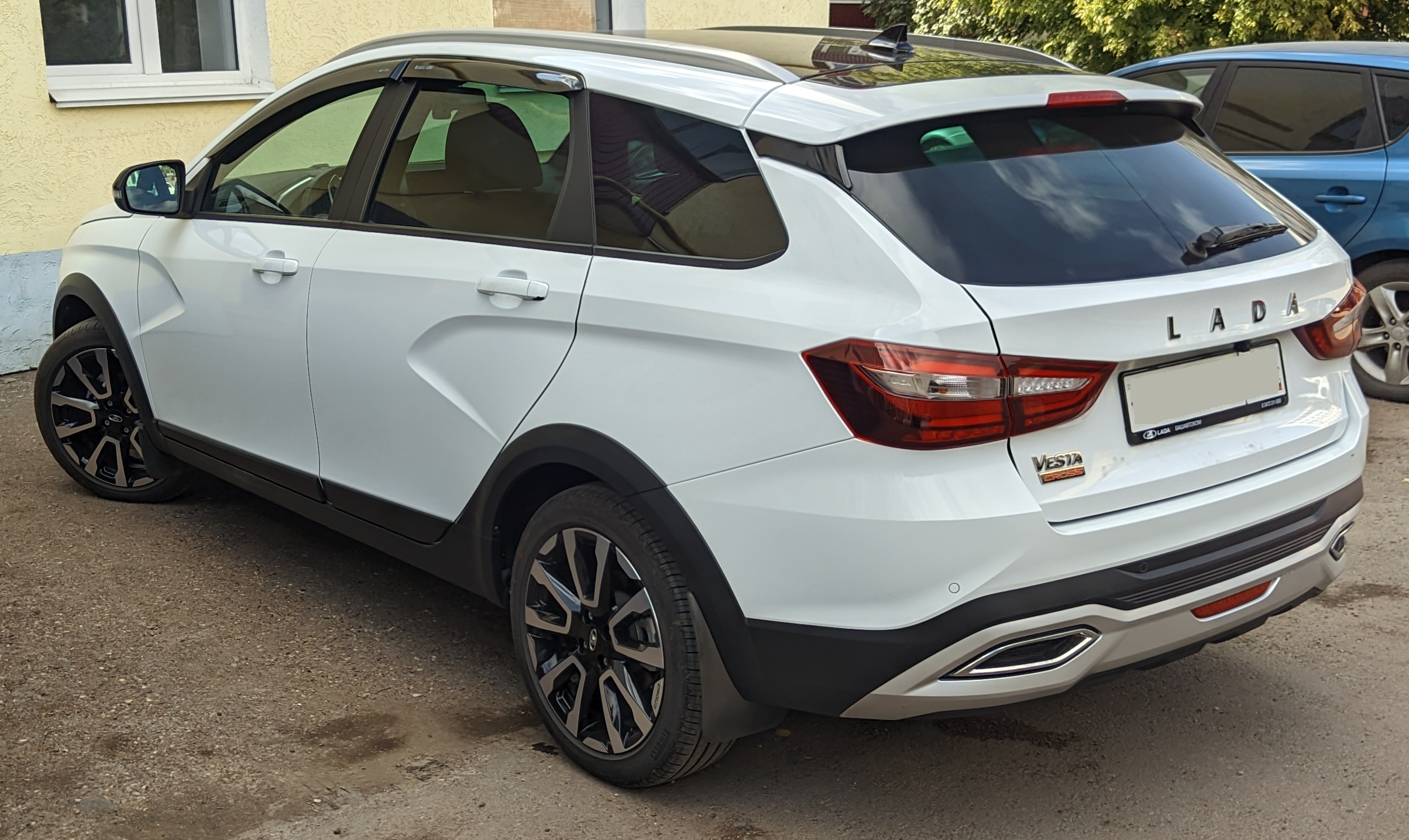
Rear view (facelift)

=== Lada Aura ===
The Lada Aura is an extended wheelbase version of the Vesta produced since August–September 2024.

== Safety ==
The car scored 14.1 points out of 16 in a frontal crash test conducted by the Russian ARCAP safety assessment program in 2016, and was awarded four stars out of four.

== Racing ==
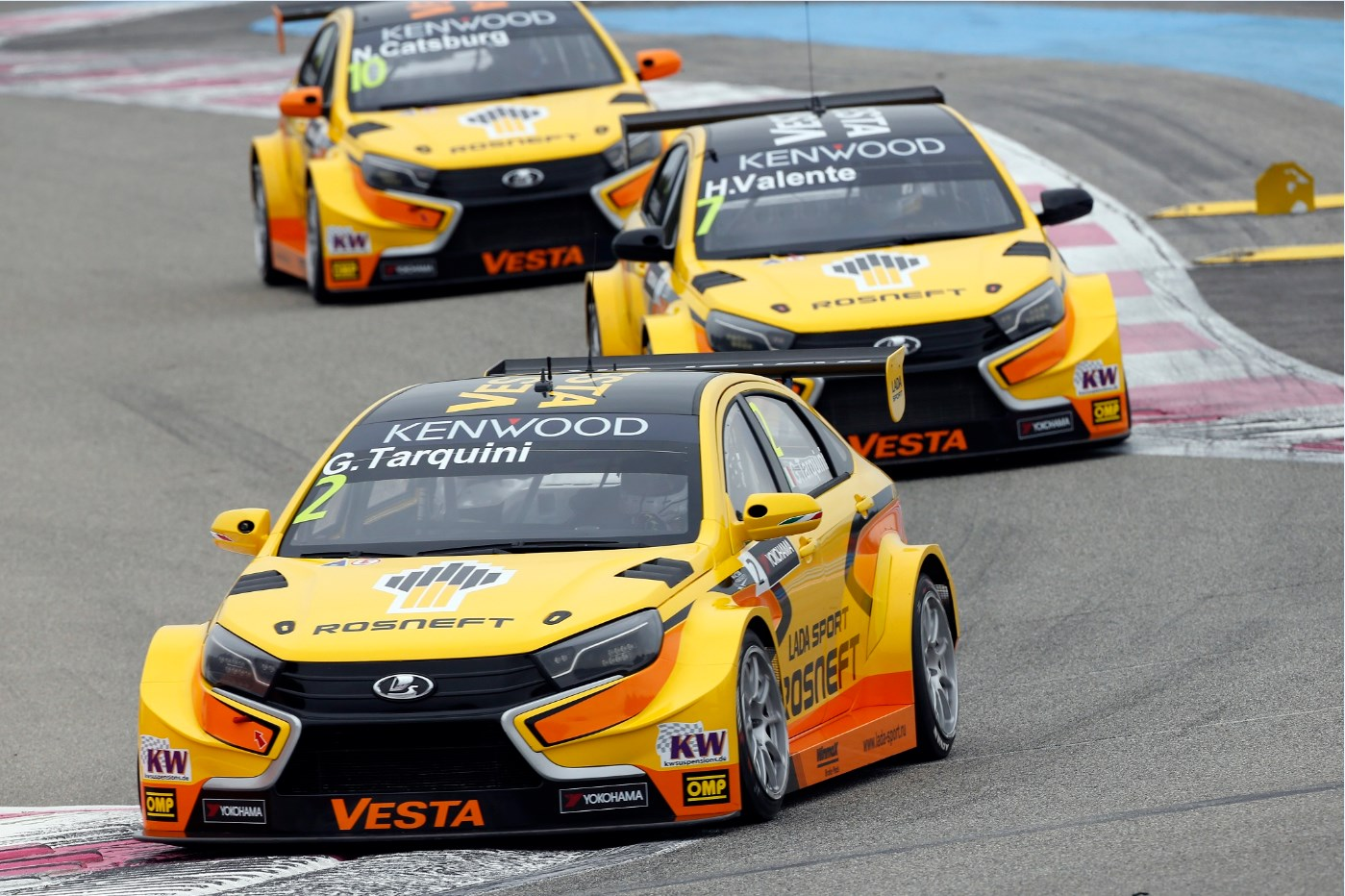
2016 Lada Vesta WTCC car

The Vesta raced for Lada Sport in the FIA World Touring Car Championship between 2015 and 2016, and later with privateer RC Motorsport in 2017.

In March 2015, Lada grabbed the pole position for Race 2 of the Argentina WTCC, with a Rosneft Vesta TC1. During its time in the championship the Vesta claimed four race victories with Gabriele Tarquini, Nick Catsburg and Yann Ehrlacher driving.

== See also ==
- Lada XRAY
