= Lada Azimut =

Overview
- Manufacturer: Lada (AvtoVAZ)
- Production: 2026–present
- Assembly: Tolyatti, Samara Oblast, Russia

Body and chassis
- Class: Compact crossover SUV
- Body style: 5-door SUV
- Layout: Front-engine, front-wheel-drive

Powertrain
- Transmission: 6-speed manual 6-speed CVT

Dimensions
- Wheelbase: 2,675 mm (105.3 in)
- Length: 4,416 mm (173.9 in)
- Width: 1,838 mm (72.4 in)
- Height: 1,607 mm (63.3 in)

Chronology
- Predecessor: Lada Xray

The Lada Azimut is a compact crossover SUV produced by the Russian car manufacturer AvtoVAZ. It was first presented in 2025.

== Overview ==
The car was first unveiled in the summer of 2025 at the St. Petersburg International Economic Forum. Production began on 25 September 2026.

According to AvtoVAZ President Maxim Sokolov, Azimut is the second new crossover in the Lada lineup in nearly three decades (after the Vesta Cross/Vesta SW Cross). The model was developed entirely by Russian specialists in three years, with around a thousand new components being designed.

Unlike the Lada Vesta, the wheelbase of the Azimut has been increased from 2,635 to 2,675 mm. The length of the vehicle is 4,416 mm, the width is 1,838 mm, the height is 1,608 mm, and the ground clearance is 208 mm.

At AvtoVAZ's open house on 20 July in Tolyatti, the second prototype of the Azimut was unveiled. It differs from the previously unveiled orange show car in its more subdued dark mint color scheme and the use of stamped body panels. These changes indicate the model is highly prepared for production, scheduled for the first half of 2026.

The crossover is expected to cost around 2.5 million rubles. The Azimut is seen as the successor to the Xray and is targeted at the affordable family car segment.

Confirming recent rumors, AVTOVAZ has officially registered a patent for the exterior design of the Azimut. This is the second patent related to the new model: an air intake grille was previously registered, reflecting the key stylistic features of the future car—aggressive lines and a modern character.

Rear view

Side view

== Specifications ==
The Azimut, developed on the Lada Vesta platform via B/C platform, is planned to be equipped with naturally aspirated engines of 1.6-1.8 liters, producing 120-132 hp, or a turbocharged engine producing 150 hp. The transmission is a six-speed manual or continuously variable.

== See also ==
- Lada Iskra
