= Lada Aura =

Compact saloon

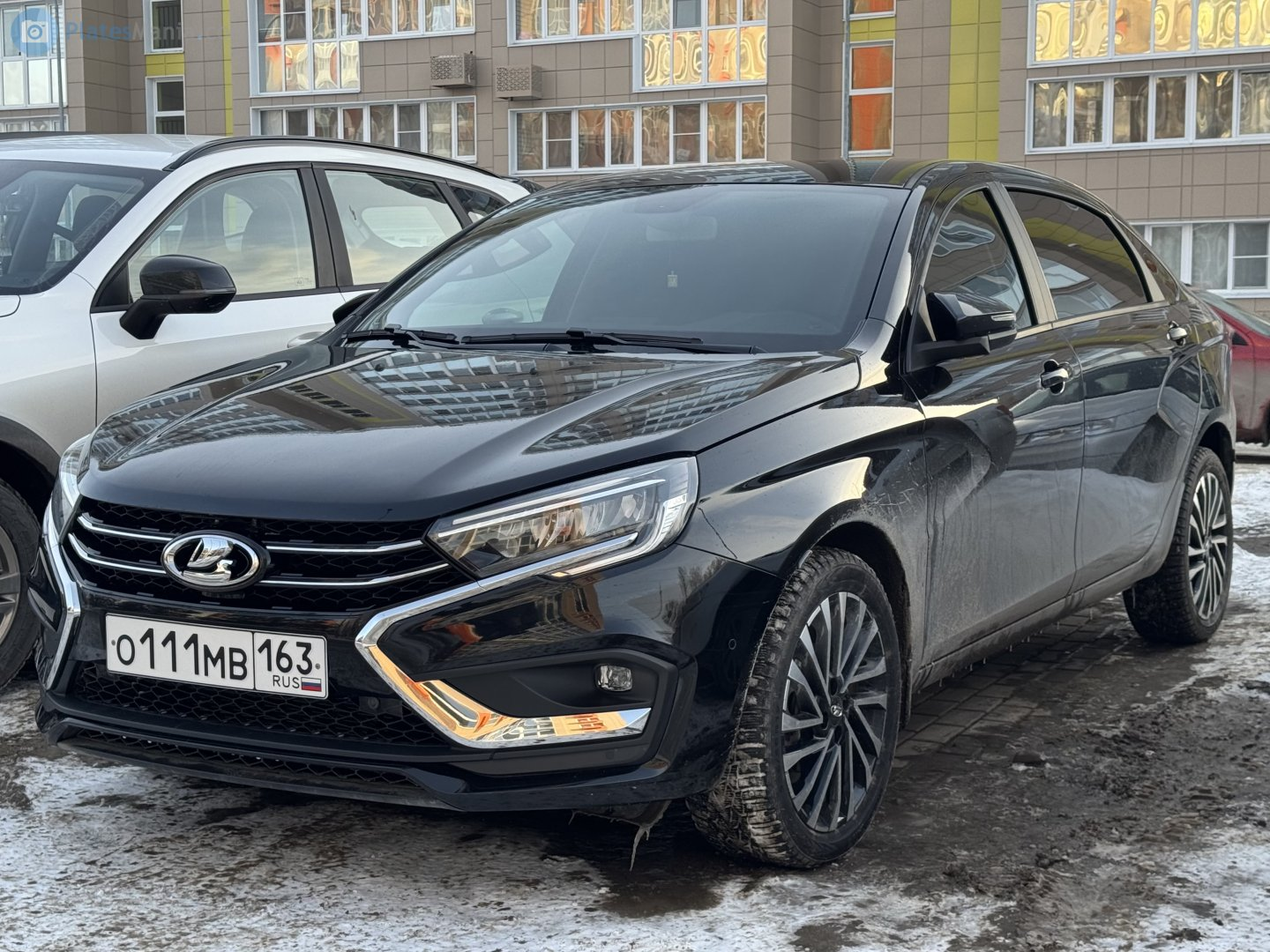

Overview
- Manufacturer: Lada (AvtoVAZ)
- Production: 2024 – present
- Assembly: Russia: Tolyatti

Body and chassis
- Body style: 4-door saloon
- Layout: Front-engine, front-wheel-drive
- Related: Lada Vesta

Powertrain
- Engine: 1.8 L VAZ 21179 I4
- Transmission: CVT

Dimensions
- Wheelbase: 2,885 mm (113.6 in)
- Length: 4,661 mm (183.5 in)
- Width: 1,764 mm (69.4 in)
- Height: 1,496 mm (58.9 in)

Chronology
- Predecessor: Lada Priora Premier

The Lada Aura is a business sedan manufactured by the Russian company AvtoVAZ, the serial production of which was planned and started to begin in August–September 2024.

It was first shown on 8 June 2023 at the “Eurasia is Our Home” exhibition, held at the “Sirius” site in Sochi, and on June 15 of the same year, the Lada Aura was presented at the St. Petersburg International Economic Forum.

== Overview ==
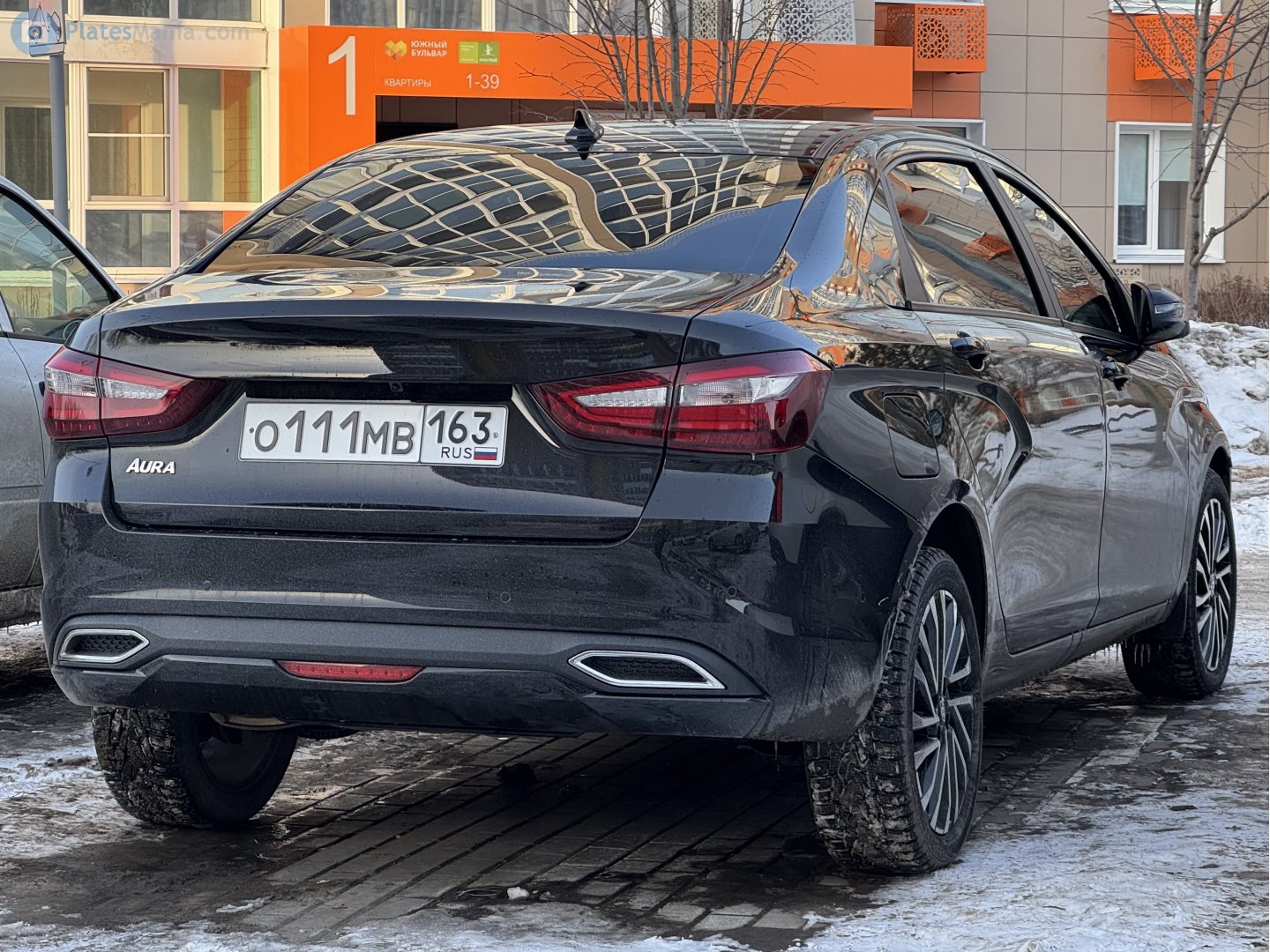
Lada Aura (Rear view)

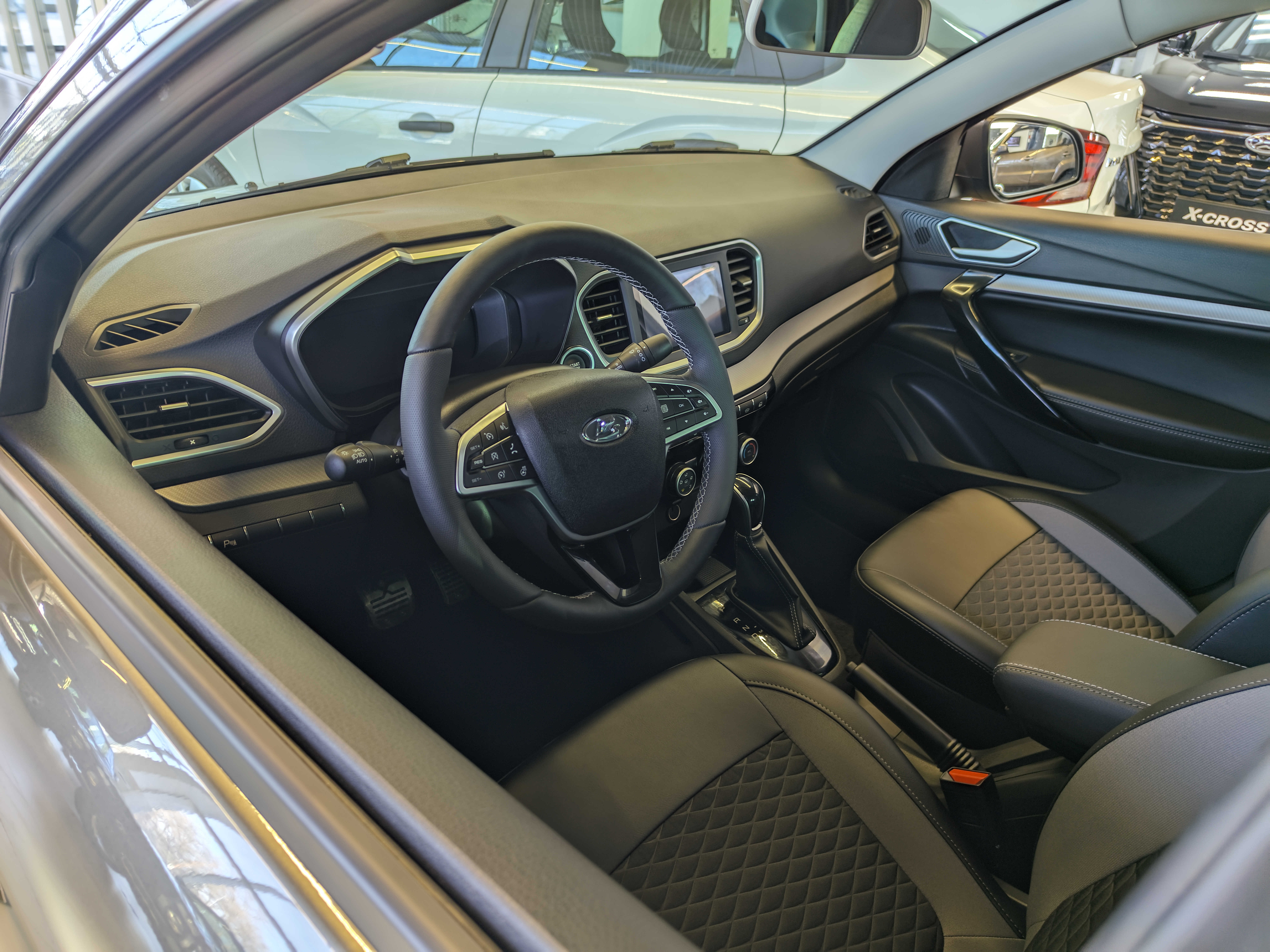
Interior

Compared to the Lada Vesta, the car received a wheelbase increased by 25 cm (9.8 in) and extended rear doors. As a result, there is more space for the passenger. The model also has improved sound insulation, a retractable armrest, genuine leather trim and a premium audio system. The Lada Aura will be equipped with a 1.8 L engine making 122 hp (91 kW) and an automatic transmission. At the presentation of the car, the Minister of Finance Anton Siluanov said that the Lada Aura "may well replace the foreign brands that Russian officials drive today".

Mass production is planned to begin in the third quarter of 2024, with plans to produce about 3 thousand cars. According to the president of AvtoVAZ Maksim Sokolov, the price of the model will be about 2.5 million rubles.

It is also planned to produce a simplified version of the Lada Aura model, intended for taxi services.

== History ==
In 2024, Vladimir Putin, driving behind the wheel, opened the last section of the M-11 highway. After driving a Lada Aura, the Russian president shared his impressions:

“A good car,” Putin told the online publication Life.

Lada Aura became the fifth new AvtoVAZ model that Putin tested; in 2010, he drove the Khabarovsk-Chita route behind the wheel of a yellow hatchback Lada Kalina. In 2011, Putin got acquainted with AvtoVAZ's new budget car at that time, the Lada Granta. In 2015, at a meeting of the Valdai Discussion Club, Vladimir Putin arrived in a green Lada Vesta. He noted that it is "an excellent car, very good, with good driving characteristics and easy to drive".
