= Vercarmodel Saro =

Italian design studio

- Industry: Automotive
- Founded: 1992; 34 years ago
- Defunct: 2020
- Headquarters: Orbassano, Italy

Vercarmodel Saro Srl was an Italian design studio and coachbuilding company based in Orbassano. It had 110 permanent employees at its peak and 96 at its last count, as well as several freelance designers.

== History ==
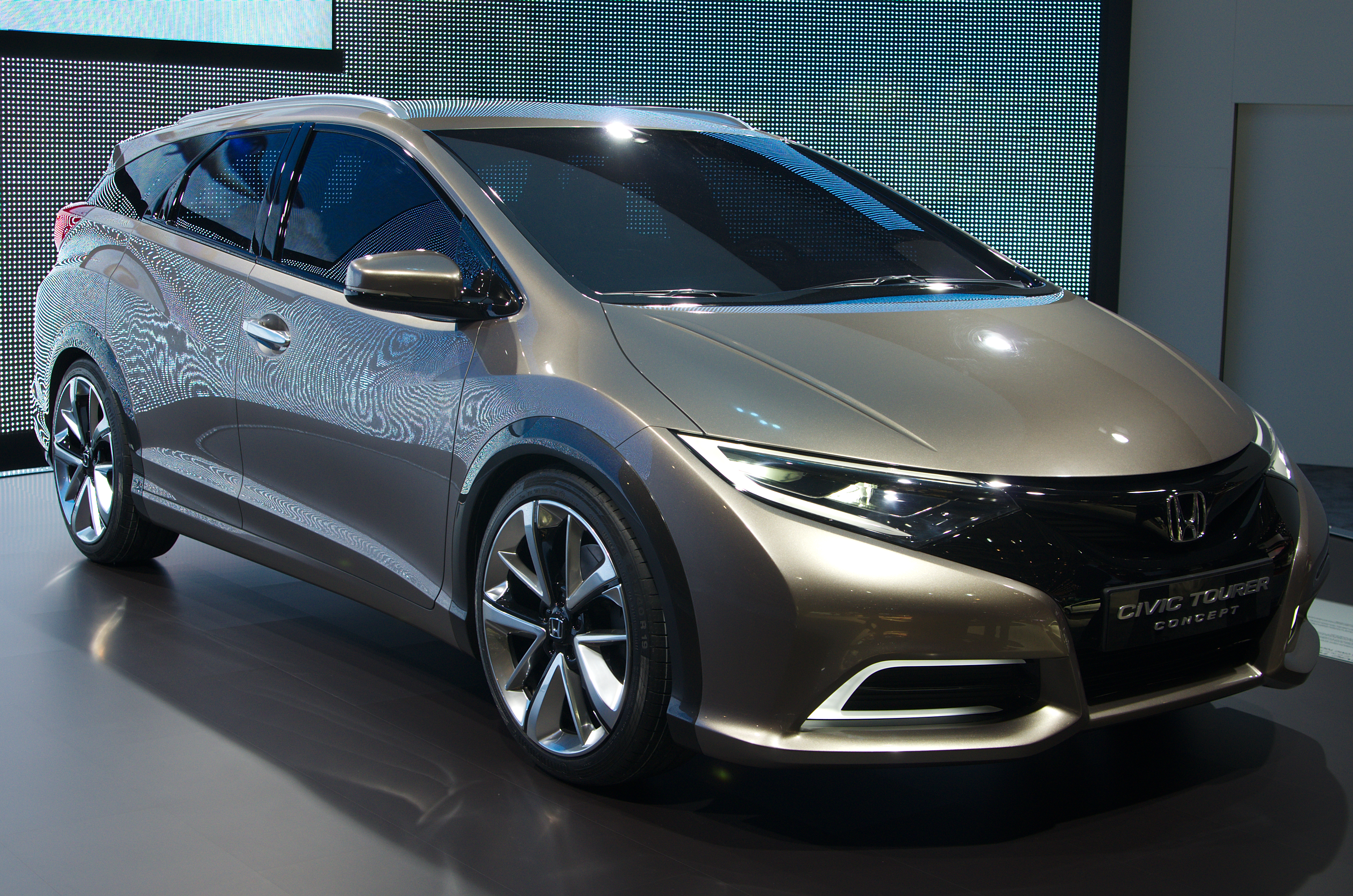
Honda Civic Tourer Concept by Vecarmodel Saro at the 2013 Geneva Motor Show

The company was founded in 1992 by Saro Falsone. Falsone was a trained painter and had worked for Carrozzeria Borgaretto since the 1970s, of which he became a partner in 1982. In 1987, he and his brothers founded the company Carrozzeria Falsone, which was mainly concerned with the color design of prototypes and styling studies.

In 1992, this became the company Vercarmodel, whose services now also included the design and construction of prototypes. Vercarmodel Saro worked for various clients from the automotive and aviation industries and made a name for itself with the development of concept vehicles. In the company's more than thirty-year history, over 200 projects have been completed. Initially, clients were mainly Stola and I.DE.A, but later Vercarmodel also worked with manufacturers such as Ford, Hyundai, Kia and Subaru. The prototype of the Alfa Romeo 4C was also built by Vercarmodel. The company premises in Orbassano covered a total area of 7,000 square meters.

The company filed for bankruptcy in December 2020 and was dissolved at the end of the same month.

== Literature ==
- Alessandro Sannia: Enciclopedia dei carrozzieri italiani, Società Editrice Il Cammello, 2017, ISBN 978-88-96796-41-2
