= Moscow International Automobile Salon =

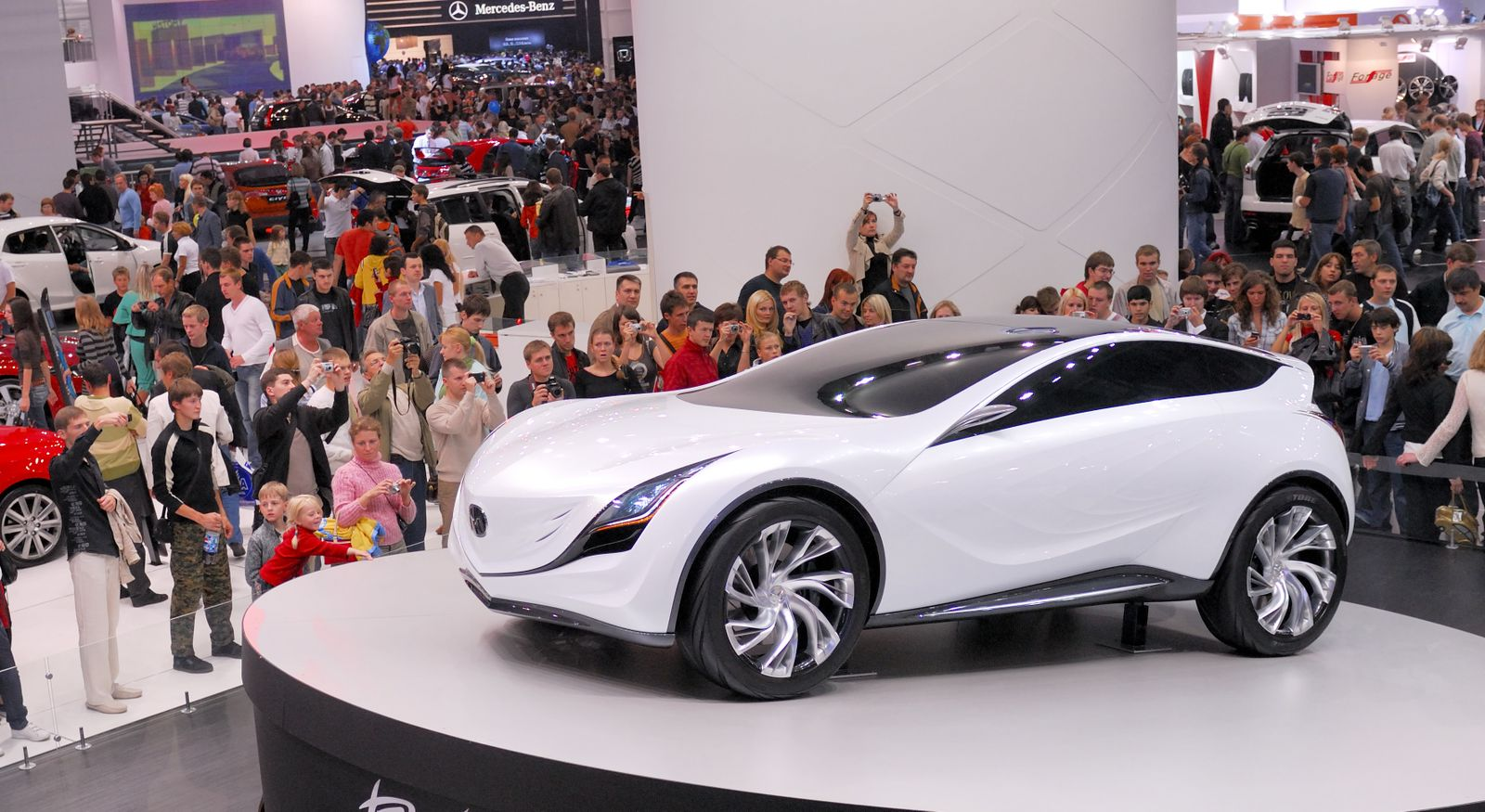
- Genre: Auto show
- Location: Moscow
- Country: Russia
- Inaugurated: 1992
- Most recent: 2018

The Moscow International Automobile Salon or MIAS (Russian: Московский Международный Автомобильный Салон) was until 2018 the biennial auto show held at Crocus Expo in Moscow, Russia. The show is scheduled by the Organisation Internationale des Constructeurs d'Automobiles, which considers it a major international auto show. The organizers are the Association of Russian Carmakers NP and the Expo Centre. Numerous dealer conferences organized by car producers are forming the integral part of the program. In September 2010, it received the status of 'A' High Class Automobile Salon.

== 2006 ==
The 2006 show was held from 30 August to 10 September.

== 2008 ==
The 2008 show was held from 26 August to 7 September.

Introductions:

- Audi A6 (facelift)
- Audi RS6
- Citroën C4 I (facelift)
- Lexus LS460 AWD
- Mazda Kazamai Concept
- Mitsubishi Pajero Sport
- Renault Symbol

== 2010 ==
The 2010 show was held from 25 August to 5 September.

Introductions:

- Ford Mondeo (facelift)
- Honda Crosstour (Russian introduction)
- Hyundai RB concept
- Hyundai Sonata (Russian introduction)
- Jaguar XJ Sentinel armored version
- Lada Priora 2011
- Lada Project R90
- Lexus RX 270
- Marussia F2
- Mitsubishi ASX (Russian introduction)
- Nissan Patrol (Russian introduction)
- Renault Latitude
- TagAZ B100 Concept
- TagAZ D100 Concept
- TagAZ Q100 Concept
- Toyota Highlander (facelift)
- Volkswagen Polo Sedan

== 2012 ==
The 2012 show was held from 29 August to 9 September.

Introductions:

- Audi R8 (facelift)
- Besturn B50 (Russian introduction)
- Bentley Continental GT Speed
- BMW i8 Spyder (concept) (European introduction)
- BMW Zagato Coupe (concept) (Russian introduction)
- Cadillac ATS (Russian introduction)
- Cadillac CTS-V sedan/coupé (Russian introduction)
- Chevrolet Cobalt (European introduction)
- Chevrolet Colorado (European introduction)
- Chevrolet TrailBlazer (European introduction)
- Citroën C5 (facelift)
- Ford Evos (concept) (Russian introduction)
- Ford Kuga (Russian introduction)
- Geely Englon SC5 (Russian introduction)
- Geely Gleagle GX7 (Russian introduction)
- Honda EV-STER Concept (Russian introduction)
- Hyundai Equus Limousine Security
- Hyundai i30 Estate (Russian introduction)
- Hyundai i40 Estate (Russian introduction)
- Hyundai Santa Fe (European introduction)
- Infiniti JX (European introduction)
- Jaguar XF AWD
- Jaguar XFR Speed Pack
- Jaguar XJ AWD
- Kia Quoris (European introduction)
- Lada XRAY (concept)
- Lada Kalina
- EL Lada EV
- Land Rover Freelander 2 (facelift)
- Lexus ES (Russian introduction)
- Lexus LS (facelift)
- Lifan 720 (Russian introduction)
- Lifan Smiley (facelift) (Russian introduction)
- Lifan X60 (Russian introduction)
- Mazda6
- Mercedes-Benz GL63 AMG
- Nissan Almera
- Nissan Juke with Ministry of Sound edition
- Opel Astra (facelift)
- Opel Astra Sedan
- SEAT Toledo concept (Russian introduction)
- Škoda Yeti Sochi
- Suzuki Grand Vitara facelift (Europe introduction)

The Best Automobile of the Moscow International Automobile Salon’2012 was for the first time held within the frames of MIAS’2012. The Bentley Continental GT Speed was awarded the Car of Dream.
