= Lada Niva =

4x4 off-road vehicle produced under Lada

Lada Niva Legend
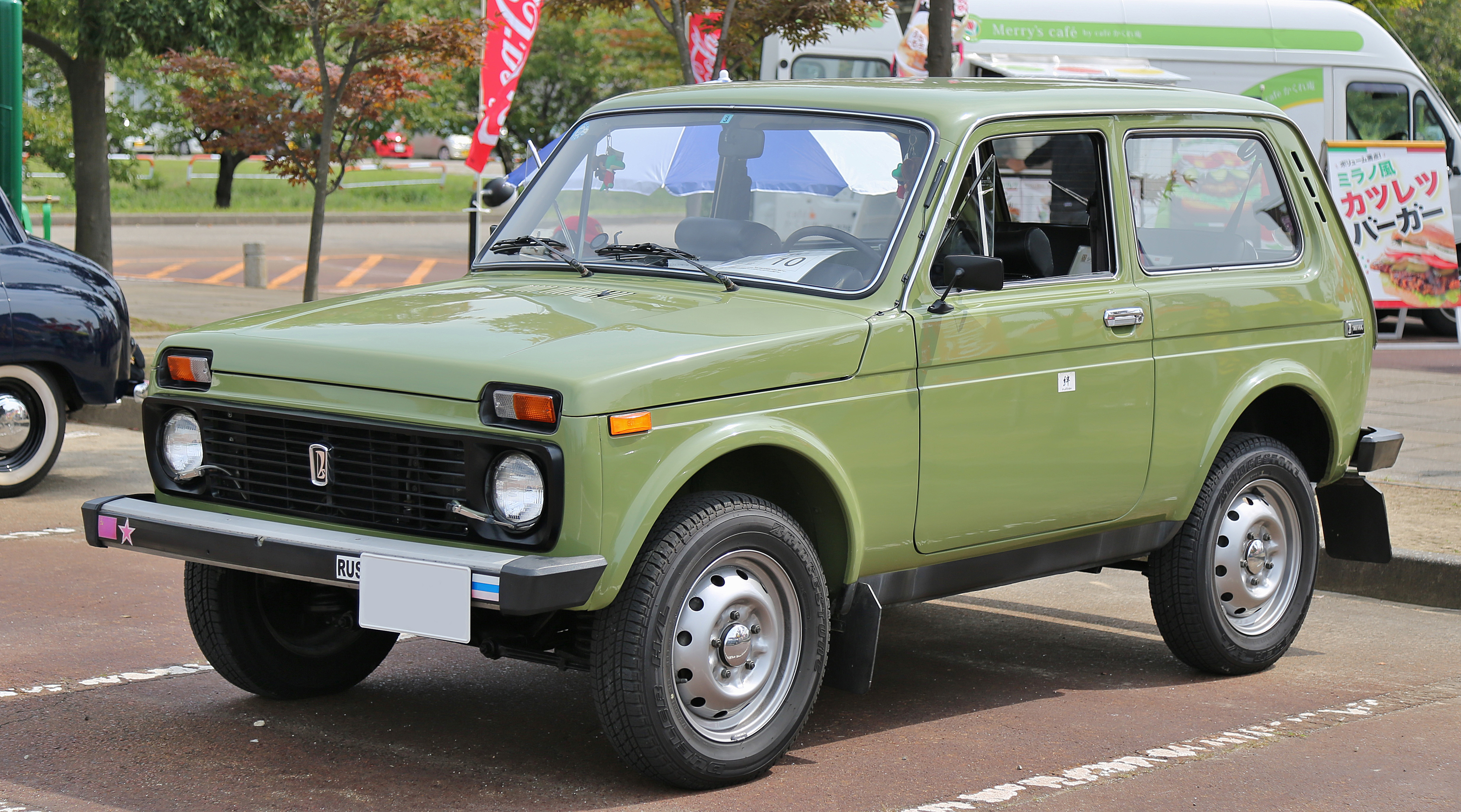
- 1987 Lada Niva

Overview
- Manufacturer: AvtoVAZ
- Also called: VAZ-2121 & VAZ-2131 "Niva" (Soviet Union/Russia; 1977–1993); Lada Super 4×4 (Egypt); Lada Bushman (Australia); Lada Cossack (United Kingdom, Canada & New Zealand); Lada Turist (New Zealand); Lada Fora; Lada Hussar (United Kingdom); Lada Job (Italy); Lada Sport (Iceland); Lada Niva; Lada Taiga (Germany, Austria & New Zealand); Vlada 4×4 (Japan)
- Production: 1977–present
- Assembly: Russia: Tolyatti (VAZ, VIS); Azerbaijan: Hajigabul (Azermash); Ecuador: Quito (Aymesa); Egypt: Cairo (Alamal Group); Ethiopia: Addis Ababa (Holland Car); Greece: Thebes (Automeccanica); Jordan: Amman (LHJ); Kazakhstan: Ust-Kamenogorsk (Azia Avto); Romania: Bucharest (Dunarea); Ukraine: Cherkasy (Bogdan); Uruguay: Montevideo (Bognor)

Body and chassis
- Class: Off-road car Compact SUV
- Body style: 3/5-door Compact SUV; 2-door pickup truck 2-door chassis cab 3-door pickup truck-based van 3-door box van 2-door ambulance 2-door police SUV
- Layout: Front-engine, full-time four-wheel-drive
- Related: VIS-2346/2946

Powertrain
- Engine: petrol: 1.6 L 2106 I4; 1.7 L 21213/4 I4; 1.8 L 2131 I4; diesel: 1.9 L XUD9A I4; 1.9 L XUD9SD turbo I4
- Transmission: 4-speed manual (1977–1993); 5-speed manual (1993–present)

Suspension
- Front: independent suspension with coil springs
- Rear: 5-link live axle

Dimensions
- Wheelbase: 2,200 mm (86.6 in) (hatchback); 2,700 mm (106.3 in) (wagon); 2,700 mm (106.3 in) (pickup)
- Length: 3,740 mm (147.2 in) (hatchback); 4,240 mm (166.9 in) (wagon); 4,520 mm (178.0 in) (pickup)
- Width: 1,680 mm (66.1 in)
- Height: 1,640 mm (64.6 in)
- Curb weight: 1,150 kg (2121); 1,210 kg (21213/21214); 1,350 kg (2131)

Chronology
- Successor: Lada Niva Travel

The Lada Niva Legend, formerly called the Lada Niva, VAZ-2121, VAZ-2131, and Lada 4×4 (Russian: ВАЗ-2121, ВАЗ-2131, Лада Нива), is a series of four-wheel drive, small (hatchback), and compact (wagon and pickup) off-road cars designed and produced by AvtoVAZ since 1977. Initially aimed at the rural market, later models also targeted urban users. The three- and later five-door 4×4 hatchbacks were sold under the Lada marque in many markets, and have been in continuous production since 1977.

In the 1990s, three- and five-door wagons on a 50 cm (20 in) longer wheelbase and an extra-long wheelbase pick-up were added to the range. After the original Land Rover and its successor, the Land Rover Defender, were discontinued in 2016, the Niva became the longest-production-run off-road light vehicle still manufactured in its original form. By the end of 2020, an estimated 650,000 Lada Nivas had been sold globally.

The Lada Niva is the world's first mass-produced off-road vehicle with a unibody construction (fully integrated body and frame). It is the predecessor of current crossover SUVs, most of which are built similarly.

In August 2020, Lada took over production of the 2003 Chevrolet Niva and rebranded it the "new" Lada Niva. In December 2020, the new Niva was further rebranded as the Lada Niva Travel, while the old model was renamed Lada Niva Legend in January 2021.

== Name ==
Нива (Niva) is a Russian word that literally means "(corn) field". The name Niva (НИВА) was formed as an acronym from the initials of Niva's chief designers' children: Pyotr Prusov's two daughters and Vladimir Solovyev's two sons.

The Lada Niva was formerly called the Lada 4×4, or the VAZ-2121 in the domestic Russian market. The name was changed after the brand was transferred to General Motors, though AvtoVAZ retained the rights to the equivalent Cyrillic name: Нива. It was also marketed as the Lada Sport in Iceland, Lada Taiga in Austria, and Lada Cossack in the United Kingdom. In 2014, it was sold as the LADA 4×4 in Russia. Since 2021, it is sold as the Lada Niva Legend in Russia.

== History ==
=== Prototypes and testing ===
The Niva was described by its designers as a "Renault 5 put on a Land Rover chassis". Development began in 1971 after the 24th Congress of the CPSU, in which Alexei Kosygin (the then-Premier of the Soviet Union) gave the designers at VAZ and AZLK the task of creating a car suitable for rural areas (specifically for the villagers and farmers of the Soviet Union), since the usual Zhiguli, Moskvitch, and Zaporozhets, intended primarily for ordinary people, were not much of use in the isolated areas that made up a large part of the USSR. In the same year, a team of VAZ designers led by Solovyev began competing with AZLK to work on a "civilized" four-wheel drive vehicle. The new car was partly inspired by the IZh-14 prototype of 1974. It was VAZ's first model that was not based on Fiat, though many of its mechanics were carried over from the earlier Fiat 124- or 125-based Zhiguli models (mostly the VAZ-2103 and 2106); the body, four-wheel drive system, and front suspension were all designed by VAZ. The first prototype appeared in 1971 and was officially designated the E-2121 and nicknamed krokodil (the crocodile) due to its distinctive frontal section, but was rejected for being too utilitarian, so doors and a hardtop were added. This version (designated the 2E-2121) debuted in 1973 and deviated from the off-road vehicles of the period, as it used a modern hatchback body. The design choice was inspired by the prototype known as the VAZ-1101 (itself derived from the Fiat 127), and was created by designer Valery Pavlovitch.

The influence of the Fiat 127 is obvious from the Niva's distinctive "clamshell" hood design and its rear three-quarter section. The 1974 prototype (designated the VAZ-2121M) was derived from an existing model, the VAZ-2103 (then the newest model in VAZ arsenal). It used the VAZ-2103's 1,452 cc engine and shared some of its features, like chrome-plated bumpers, headlights and taillights, instruments, seats, and steering wheel. In the following year, two samples of the prototype were modified to install a 1,478 cc UZAM-412 engine, which originally powered the Moskvich 1500. Testing later revealed that the engine was incompatible with the newly designed car. The Moskvich engine was abandoned, and the older engine was reused. The 1974 prototype (2121M) was ready to be mass-produced in 1975, but the appearance of the new VAZ-2106 at the end of the year resulted in a delay because the company wanted to develop another prototype based on the model in 1976, which became the sixth and final (serial production) prototype.

Before its production, the Niva was tested over a period of years by a team led by Vadim Kotlyarov in the most difficult terrain of the Soviet Union, such as the Ural Mountains and Siberia, the deserts of the Kazakh SSR, and the Pamir Mountains in the Tajik SSR, where it was compared with its military counterpart, the UAZ-469, and some Western off-road vehicles—the British-made Land Rover Series and the Range Rover Classic. Its off-road capabilities were demonstrated for the very first time, which were based on its effective permanent four-wheel drive system featuring a transfer case and central differential lock, with the combination of a short wheelbase (only 2,2m), relatively low weight (just over a ton), independent front suspension, small dimensions (3,74×1,68 m), and high ground clearance (about 265 mm). Its large but narrow wheels (175/80-R16 in dimensions), originally featuring domestically designed "Voltyre" VLI-5 high-tread tires, offered relatively strong ground pressure, which lowered the chances of slipping or getting bogged down off-road. For example, in the 1973 and 1974 trials, the Niva climbed a 58% slope, and crossed 60 cm (24 in) of water and 100 cm (39 in) of mud and snow. Solovyev died the following year and was replaced by engineer Pyotr Prusov, who took credit for creating the car.

In 1976, the final prototype appeared. The engine was changed to a 1,568 cc (95.7 cu in) one, the most powerful engine in VAZ during the Soviet era, taken from their VAZ-2106 (from which the production model of the first Niva generation was generally derived). Like the previous prototype, it featured a permanent four-wheel drive and a transfer case with a lockable central differential. The VAZ prototype displayed better design and real-world performance than its AZLK counterpart, the Moskvitch 416, so it was approved for production in March of the same year, after the 25th Congress of the CPSU. The car was named Niva 1600 (Field) for exports and the VAZ-2121 (alternatively "Niva 2121" or "VAZ Niva") for the domestic market. For domestic customers, it was described as "[a] high-speed car with the improved capabilities and comfort of all VAZ models," and also as "[a] combination of the speed and comfort of a Zhiguli with the capabilities of a UAZ." Production began the following year on 5 April 1977, while the first export models appeared in 1978 at the Paris Motor Salon and quickly took over at least 40% of Europe's market for four-wheel drive vehicles, making it Lada's top-selling export. It was the only Soviet car that was ever regularly sold in Japan, starting in the early 1980s. Because of export demand and the higher priority given to exports, domestic customers faced long wait times, despite the car being developed primarily for Soviet citizens.

Until the 1993-1994 facelift, which introduced alternate body styles and powertrains, the Niva didn't have any significant production variants, beyond two export configurations. The VAZ-21211 was a potential variant with 1.3L 69hp engine of the VAZ-21011, allegedly manufactured in 1978-1987 for select Western European export markets (most often claimed to be the Netherlands, Belgium or Italy). The VAZ-21211 is well-documented in official paperwork, but it remains unknown whether it had actually entered proper series production at any scale: mentions of the VAZ-21211 in the Soviet documentation of the 1970s and 1980s are inconsistent, the period advertisements from Western European countries rarely mention any 1.3L Niva variants and no surviving specimen have been documented in museums or private collections. The VAZ-21212 was a right-hand drive configuration of the standard 1.6L variant for the British market, sold in the UK from February 1983 to September 1995; previously the British Nivas were left-hand-drive from November 1978 until February 1983, as the already offset location of the steering column has made it difficult to relocate it to the other side without significantly reworking it.

=== Design ===
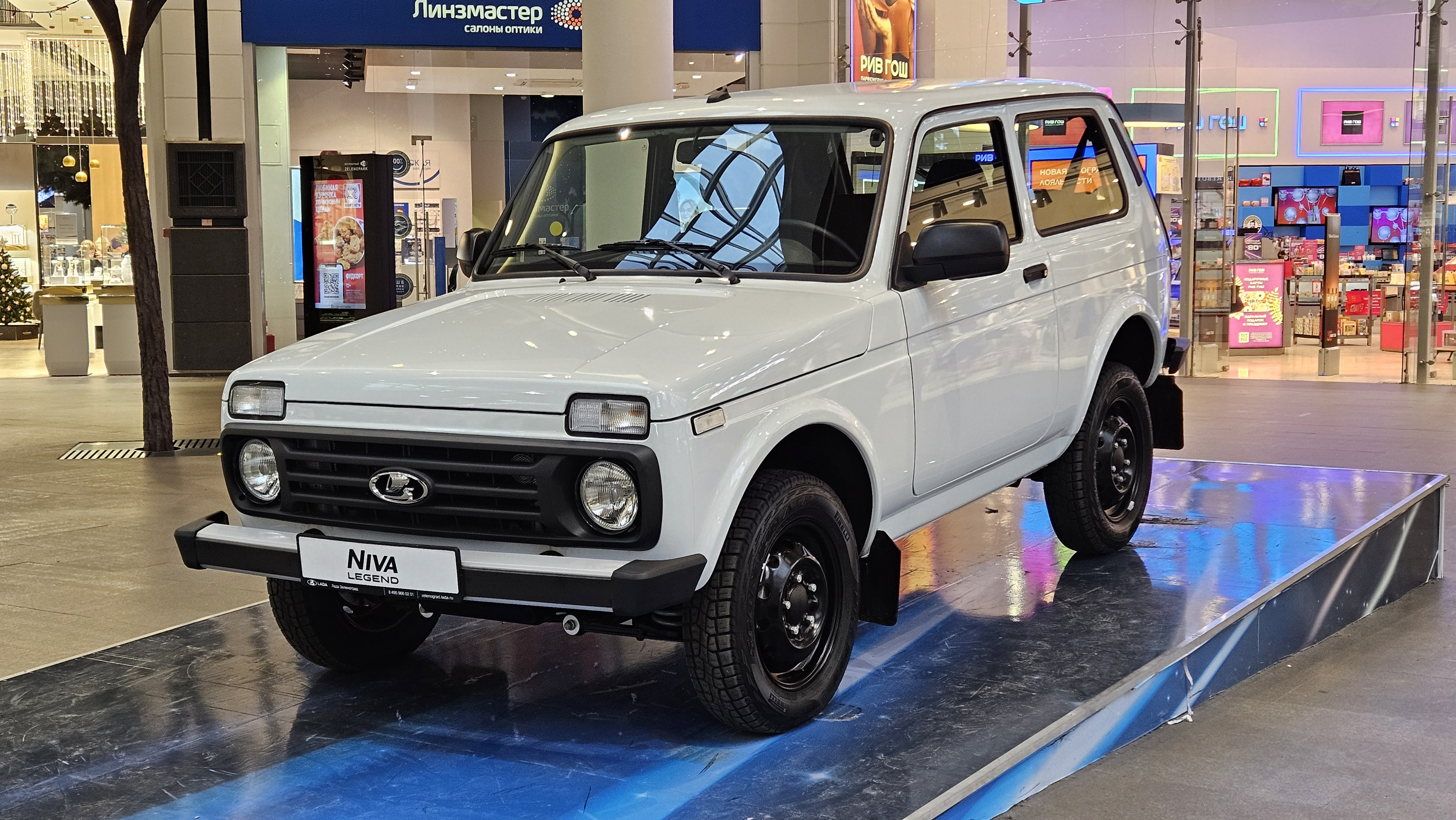
Current model in production, the Lada Niva Legend

The original Niva has a naturally aspirated 1.6-L overhead-cam four-cylinder petrol engine producing 76 PS (56 kW) and 126 N⋅m (93 lb⋅ft) at 5,000 rpm, a four-speed manual transmission, and a full-time four-wheel drive. The drive system uses three differentials: center, front, and rear. The transfer case involves a high/low range selector lever and another to lock the central differential. Like usual gear shifting, both of the aforementioned features naturally require the use of clutch to be properly selected. However, while the central differential can usually be locked while in motion, the transfer case cannot and requires a complete stop. The original Niva has a maximum speed of 81 mph (130 km/h).

Coil springs are located at each of the four wheels, and the suspension is independent in front, whereas the rear axle is a five-link live-type, with ratios between 3.90 and 4.30 depending on the model and market. Ground clearance is 235 mm (9.3 in), and go as far as 510 mm (20 in) deep in water.

The brakes are servo-assisted dual-circuit style and the clutch is hydraulic. The turning circle is 11.05 m (36.3 ft). Cargo space is 0.48 m^{3} (17 ft^{3}), or 1.33 m^{3} (47 ft^{3}) with the rear seats folded down and, like the classic Zhiguli, the front seats can be set up to make two berths. A spare tire can be stored in the engine bay under the bonnet.

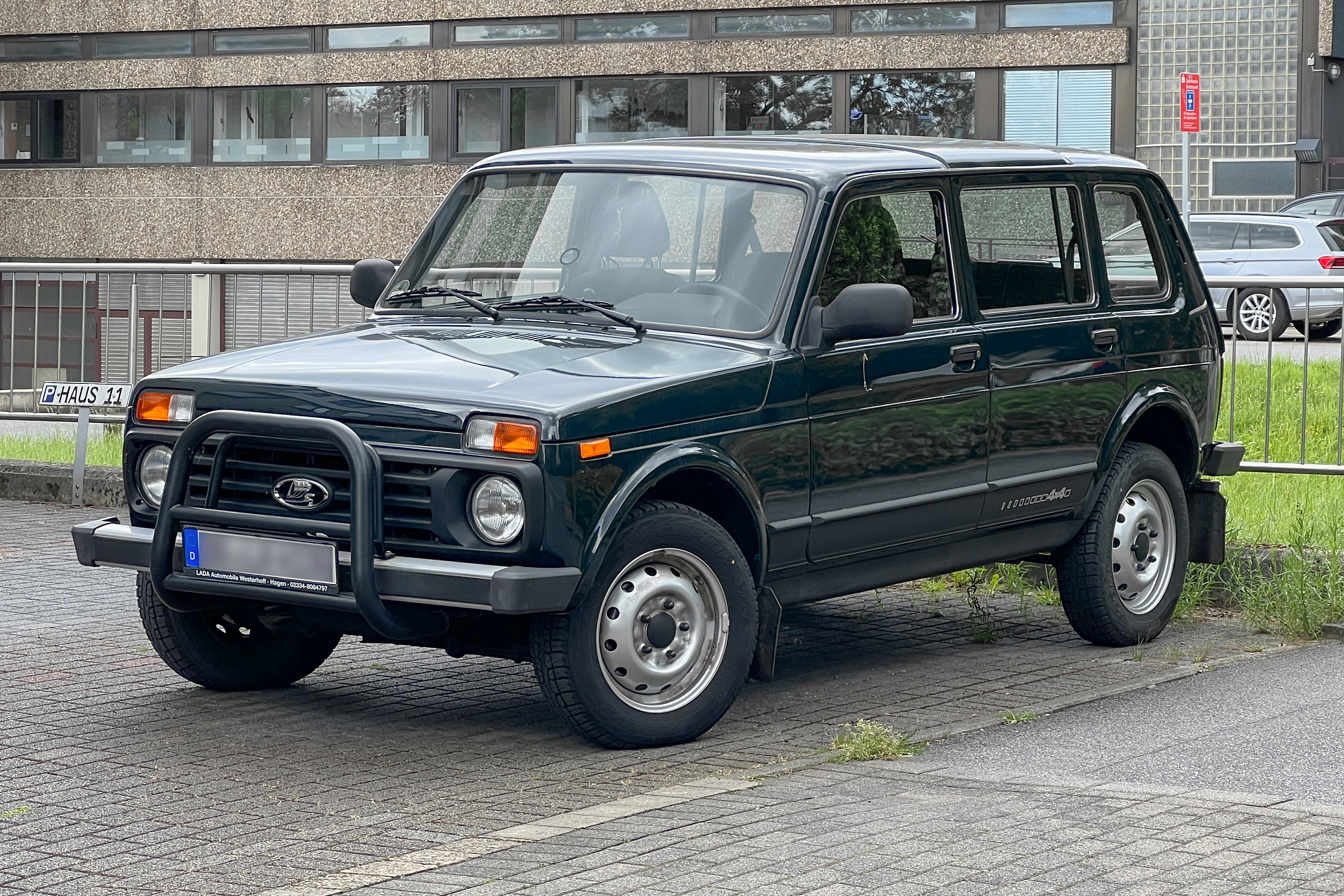
Five-door station wagon (VAZ-2131)

Additional equipment for the basic model was similar to other Lada and Eastern Bloc cars of the period; it included headlight wipers, a rear fog lamp, a right external mirror (for domestic units until the end of the 1980s), rear seat belts, a rear window wiper, a rear window heater, and a radio set. On the Niva 1.7 or VAZ-21213 from 1994, all of the above features except headlight wipers and the rear fog lamp (which were discontinued) became default and air conditioning, an anti-lock braking system, and a hydraulic servomotor for the steering column were made optional, although they became standard equipment on the newest models.

Foreign (usually Western) local Lada importers often offered their own additional equipment before buying the car, such as front and rear bull bars and roll bars, side rocker rails, roof rails, a winch, fender plastics, additional headlights for front bumper and for roof rails, and aftermarket aluminium rims, which can be often seen mounted on many Nivas.

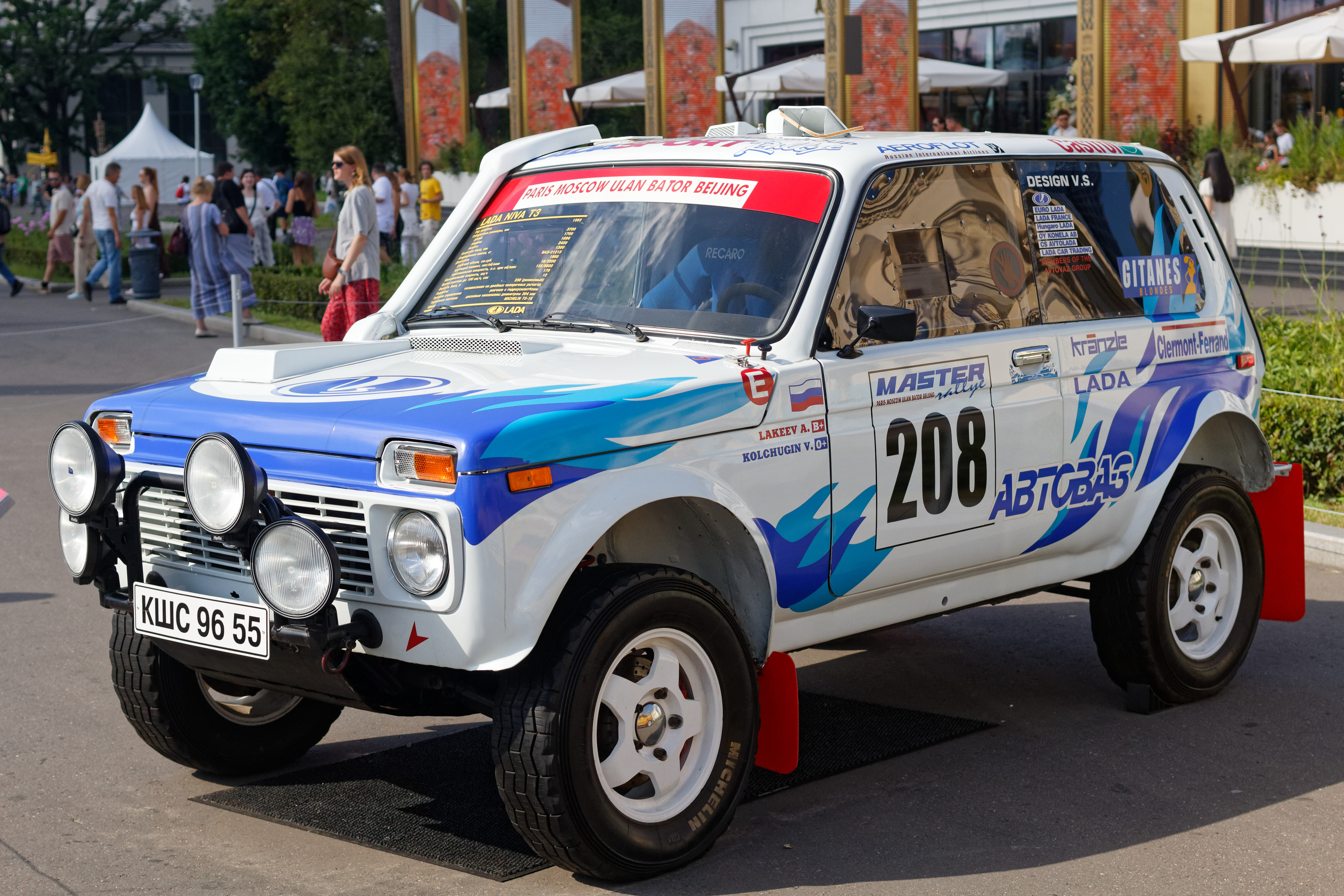
Lada Niva T3 Rally

The existing model was slightly restyled during first half of the 1980s when VAZ discontinued the VAZ-2103 (which had slowly been replaced by the VAZ-2106 since 1975). Due to high prices and production complexity, some of the chrome-plated elements disappeared in later models, such as the chrome-plated mask and rocker panel edges. Other elements were changed, such as the side mirrors, which became black metallic. The background of the front Lada badge was changed from red to white (and later black on the new model) on all models. The side rear retroreflectors (or turn signals on some models, depending on market) were replaced by Lada (left) and Niva (right) labels, and the rear mudflaps received the brand logo. For easier access to certain areas of the engine compartment, the window washer reservoir was moved from the left to the right section of the compartment (right in front of the battery). The interior was only minimally changed, along with some minor changes to the instrument panel and choke knob.

Pre-1985 models are visually recognized by the aforementioned details, and are rare today (almost nonexistent in a well-preserved condition), so they are highly valued by various collectors of classic cars. A mint-condition 1980 unit in Russia reached a price of five million RUB and ultimately sold for 3,2 million in 2016 (approximately €38,570 or $44,570), which remains the most expensive Niva ever sold.

The VAZ-2121 Niva or Lada Niva 1600 was in production until 1993 (it existed in parallel production with the new model until the end of 1993) when the newer and more powerful four-cylinder petrol engine was introduced, replacing the previously used VAZ-2106 engine. The standard Weber carburetor was replaced by a single-point fuel injection initially supplied by General Motors on the 21214/1.7i model, and an improved Solex carburetor on the 21213/1.7 model. The transmission was changed from four to five speeds, mechanical ignition was replaced, and the electronics and suspension received some relatively minor changes. The exhaust system was also slightly redesigned, and on newer models, the drive shafts received homokinetic joints.

On the exterior, the rear section of the body was redesigned with the tailgate extended and license plate on it. These changes prompted new vertical taillights that replaced the former VAZ-2106 horizontal ones and the VAZ-2102 chromed tailgate knob, which was replaced by a simple plastic handle. On the newest models, the old hand-adjustable, square black-metallic (previously chrome-plated) side mirrors, which originated from the VAZ-2103 were replaced with larger plastic ones that could be automatically adjusted.. The previous front Lada badge was replaced with the larger ellipsoid design. The Fiat 125 chrome-plated doorknobs are still present, though they are plastic on the newest models. Although the rest of the exterior has remained generally unchanged (except for the Lada 4×4 Urban and Bronto), the interior was almost completely redesigned and shares only a few interchangeable parts with the previous one: the archaic partially chrome-plated VAZ-2106 steering wheel was replaced with the more modern and thick one from the VAZ-2107 and later, even newer models, as well as its VAZ-2103/2106 instruments, which were replaced with the dashboard from the VAZ-21099. The black artificial leather seats that originated from the VAZ-2106 were replaced by higher, more modern ones from the VAZ-2108, with the front surface made of polyester, while the rear seat was improved for easier folding. The Fiat 124 swiveling windows from the side doors disappeared and were replaced with air conditioning, which was installed with the ABS and servomotor for the steering column as additional equipment on request, while the headlight wipers and rear fog lamp disappeared. It received completely new front and door panels (with interior door knobs relocated above the hand rests instead of under like on previous generation), various plastics and even new floor mats. The hand openings for the side-door windows was replaced with an automatic opening on the newest models (and on the Lada 4×4 Urban) starting from 2014. Multipoint fuel injection designed by Bosch has been used since 2004, replacing the previously mentioned single-point injection from General Motors.

=== Later models ===
A convertible version appeared in 1983, but was neither serially produced nor designed by VAZ. It was a modification of the original Niva 1600 bodied by French coachbuilder Wassermann for the local market. It was known as the Niva Plein Soleil (Sunlight) and it was one of many Niva modifications made by local importers for their markets.

The lengthened model of the Niva appeared in 1993. It was known as the VAZ-2129 and was produced very briefly, only for about a year, so it is very rare. It was also never exported. Although it has a longer wheelbase, it kept three doors like the basic hatchback model. In design, it was a hybrid of old and new generations, since it featured the old VAZ-2121 (Niva 1600) body and interiors combined with new VAZ-21213 (Niva 1.7) 1680-cc engine and 5-speed transmission (although later, 1994 production models featured even new body and interiors).

The lengthened estate model with a longer wheelbase and five doors was made in 1995. It was originally known as the VAZ-2131 Niva, but commercially, it has no difference in name from the standard three-door model, and it is often referred as the Niva five-door. Due to its increased weight from the longer wheelbase, it can use the 1774-cc inline four petrol engine. Although it was still in production like the basic model, it had limited use and was infrequently exported, mainly due to the longer wheelbase and increased weight, and it was slightly higher priced compared to the standard model. In 2015, a five-door model also appeared for the Lada 4×4 Urban.

In 1999, a diesel-engine model of the Niva known as the VAZ-21215 Niva, or commercially as the Lada Niva 1.9, was released. It was produced until 2007 and sold only in a few markets. It was powered by a 1905-cc Peugeot XUD 9SD inline four diesel engine, and it was less powerful than the standard VAZ-21213/21214 1680-cc petrol engine. However, the VAZ-21215 was a relatively short-lived model despite lower fuel consumption, because it was not popular in the domestic market, Peugeot stopped producing XUD engines in 2001 (although existing supplies were available until 2007, when the last VAZ-21215 came off the production line), and VAZ did not make another contract for diesel engine production for the Niva.

In 2006, the model with the carbureted engine of the new generation (VAZ-21213/Lada Niva 1.7) was discontinued, and the name Niva was formally dropped in favor of the new official name Lada 4×4, as General Motors received naming rights. The Niva was discontinued under the old Soviet VAZ-2121 domestic market classification.

In 2014, the new, restyled model called the Lada 4×4 Urban was released. It has more modern, ordinary looks, including a new mask, plastic bumpers, new side mirrors, different aluminium rims, new tires, a central brake light, heated front seats, and a slightly restyled interior. As of 2019, no version of the Lada 4x4 has airbags.

In 2017, the Lada 4×4 Bronto, intended mainly for off-road use, is released. It features characteristic mask and plastic bumpers with integrated front and rear fog lamps, plastic roof rails, new, larger wheels with black aluminium rims and 235/75-R16 Bontyre Stalker off-road tires, even higher ground clearance (increased another 35 mm) and plastic rust-protected body edges (fenders and rocker panels). Internally, it is similar to the Lada 4×4 URBAN, also featuring heated front seats. It also includes a front winch, roof headlights, and additional fog lights on the front bumper. With all the mentioned equipment included, the Bronto is currently the most expensive Lada 4×4 model, with a current price of 720 thousand RU in the domestic market (around €10,130). The slightly different pickup model designed by VIS was also revealed (featuring an integrated metallic grille, different bumpers, and a snorkel), called the Lada Bronto AMC.

On 5 April 2017, at the car's 40th anniversary, a special, limited edition of the classic Lada 4×4 called the Lada 4×4 40th-Anniversary was presented, which used the 1977 design. It features new aluminium rims similar to the Urban, five new color schemes, "40th Anniversary" metallic labels on the fenders, a tailgate, a glove compartment cover, front-seat backrests, and floor mats. Also, it has a slightly restyled interior featuring genuine leather seat upholstery and a steering wheel cover, and sills made out of stainless steel. The model is available from June 2017 in both domestic and export markets.

In 2020 Niva received a major upgrade, changes included better lights, more comfortable seats, an instrument panels with LCD displays, alloy wheels, electric windows and mirrors, heated seats and air conditioning.

=== Cossack and other importer special editions ===
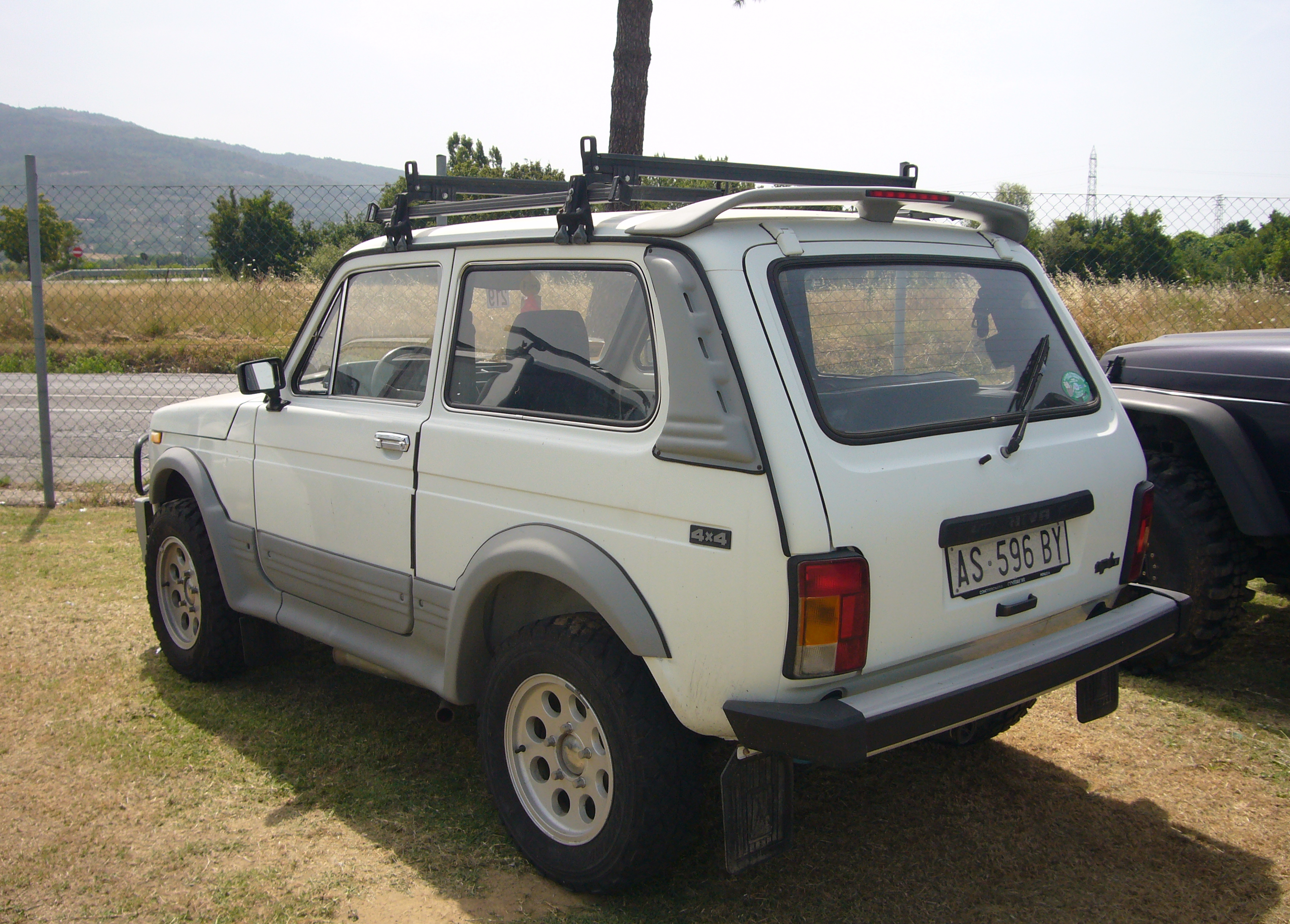
Lada Niva 1.7i in with various importer-installed special equipment (Italy)

During the 1980s, local Lada importers in various markets made their own upgrades to help compete with more modern SUVs. In the UK, the Cossack model featured large body decals, roof rails, running boards, 15-in alloy wheels, and on some versions, a sunroof, steel bullbars, spotlights, a rear-mounted spare tire, and semi-bucket seats. Other markets' importers made similar upgrades and many were also called Cossack.

In 1995, Lada UK introduced a face-lifted version of the Niva Cossack and renamed the basic model as the Hussar. Whereas the Hussar had the original 1977 trim, the new UK Cossack featured a new Rover-designed grille and other body kit items, and gained soft nudge-bars at the front in deference to public opinion against bullbars. Both models received the same new 1.7-litre engine and a new deeper tailgate which extended the rear opening to the level of the bumper – a vast improvement over the original model's high lip. Official Niva imports to the UK ceased in 1997 due to the importers having difficulty in sourcing the GM fuel injection unit required to satisfy ever-tightening UK emissions regulations.

Several attempts were made to reintroduce Ladas into the UK. In May 2010, the basic Niva became available again through an independent importer. Aimed largely at the agricultural market, three models were made available: the three-door, four-seat hatchback; a two-seat commercial van; and a two-door, four-seat pickup.

=== VAZ-2122 Reka ===
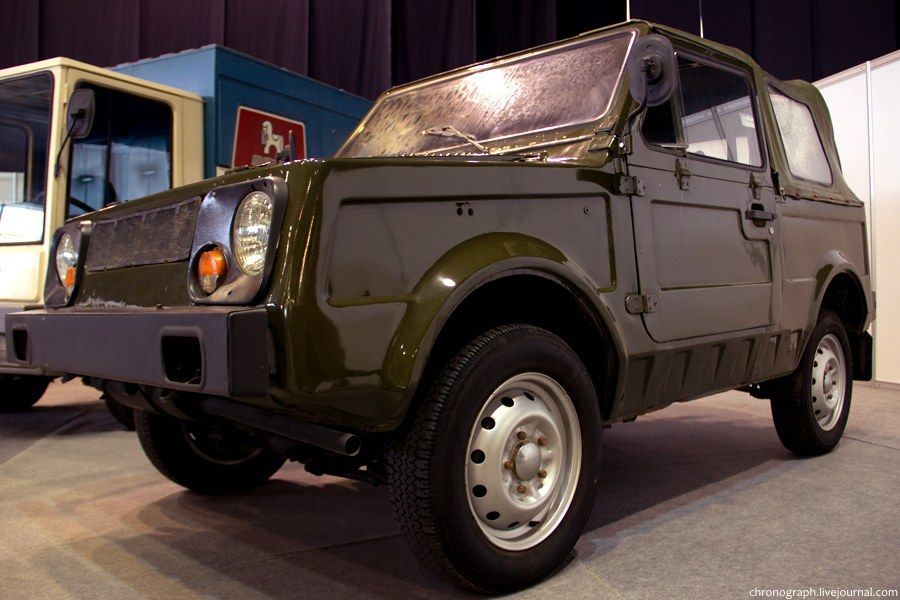
VAZ 2122 Reka

Although VAZ was meant exclusively to produce passenger cars, the Soviet military was impressed by its off-road capabilities and ordered VAZ to create a military version, to replace the UAZ-469 as the standard military 4×4 vehicle. In 1976, when VAZ-2121 development was almost finished, engineers from Tolyatti began working on an amphibian off-roader, which became known as VAZ-2122 Reka (River). A simplified and more rugged body was combined with the Niva chassis. It weighed about the same as the usual Niva, but instead of the 1600-cc VAZ-2106 engine, it used an older and less powerful 1300-cc engine derived from the VAZ-2101. Internally, it featured a different metal dashboard, though it used the same Niva instruments along with the same steering wheel and artificial leather seats.

Six different evolution prototypes were built. They were tested in an experimental military unit, on the proving grounds of the Ministry of Defense, and in the Karakum Desert in Turkmenistan. The VAZ-2122 showed better results than the UAZ-469 (especially the fact that it featured amphibious capabilities, which UAZ did not have) and received very positive feedback; the military was satisfied with its capabilities, reliability, firmness and durability. By 1987, VAZ had completed development work, and the car was ready for mass production and military service. Nevertheless, the results were not enough to convince the military to start mass production.

=== LWB Nivas ===
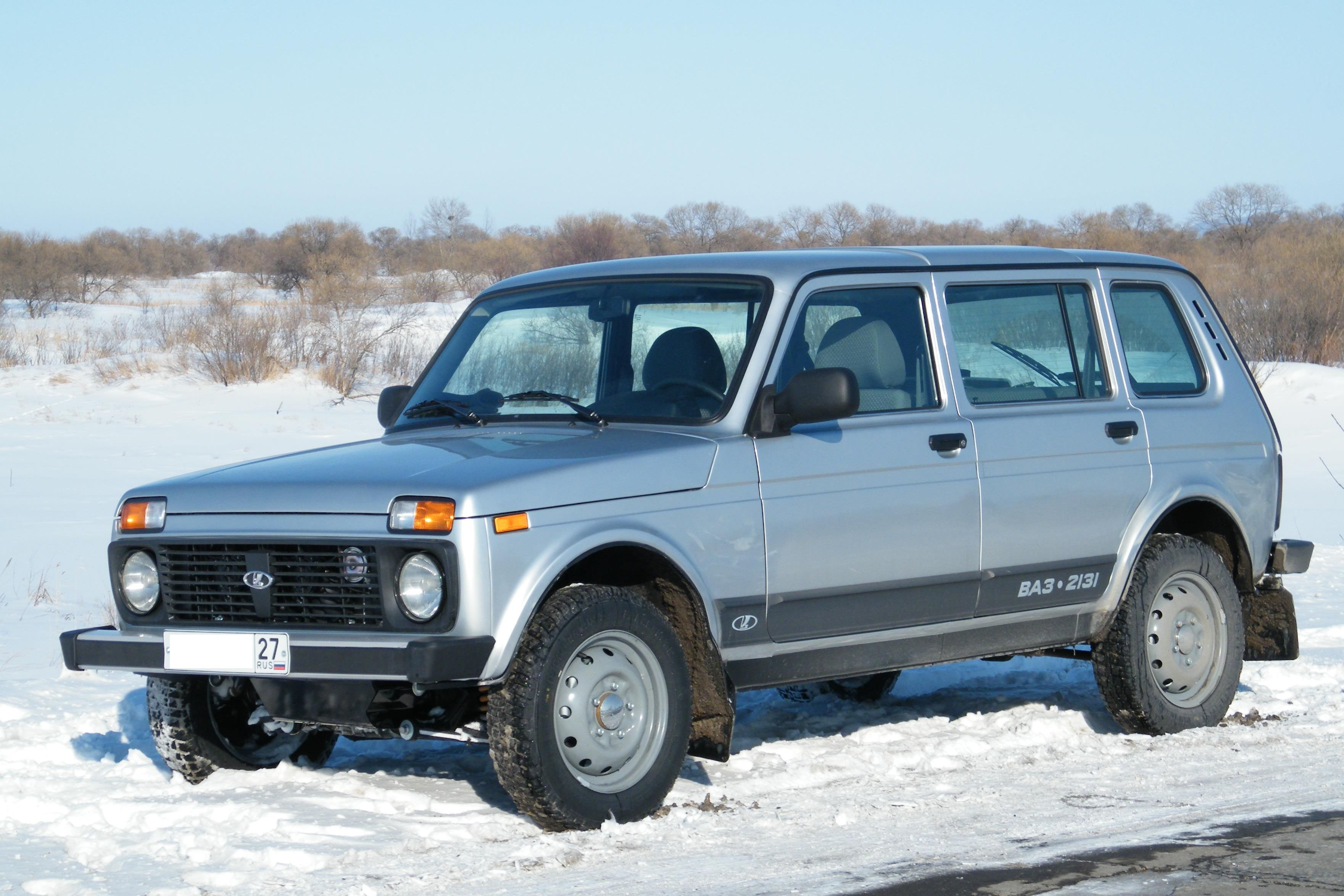
VAZ-2131

Longer wheelbase versions – the five-door VAZ-2131, three-door VAZ-2129, and VAZ-2329 pickup were also produced from the 1990s, but not generally exported.

=== Nameplate changes ===
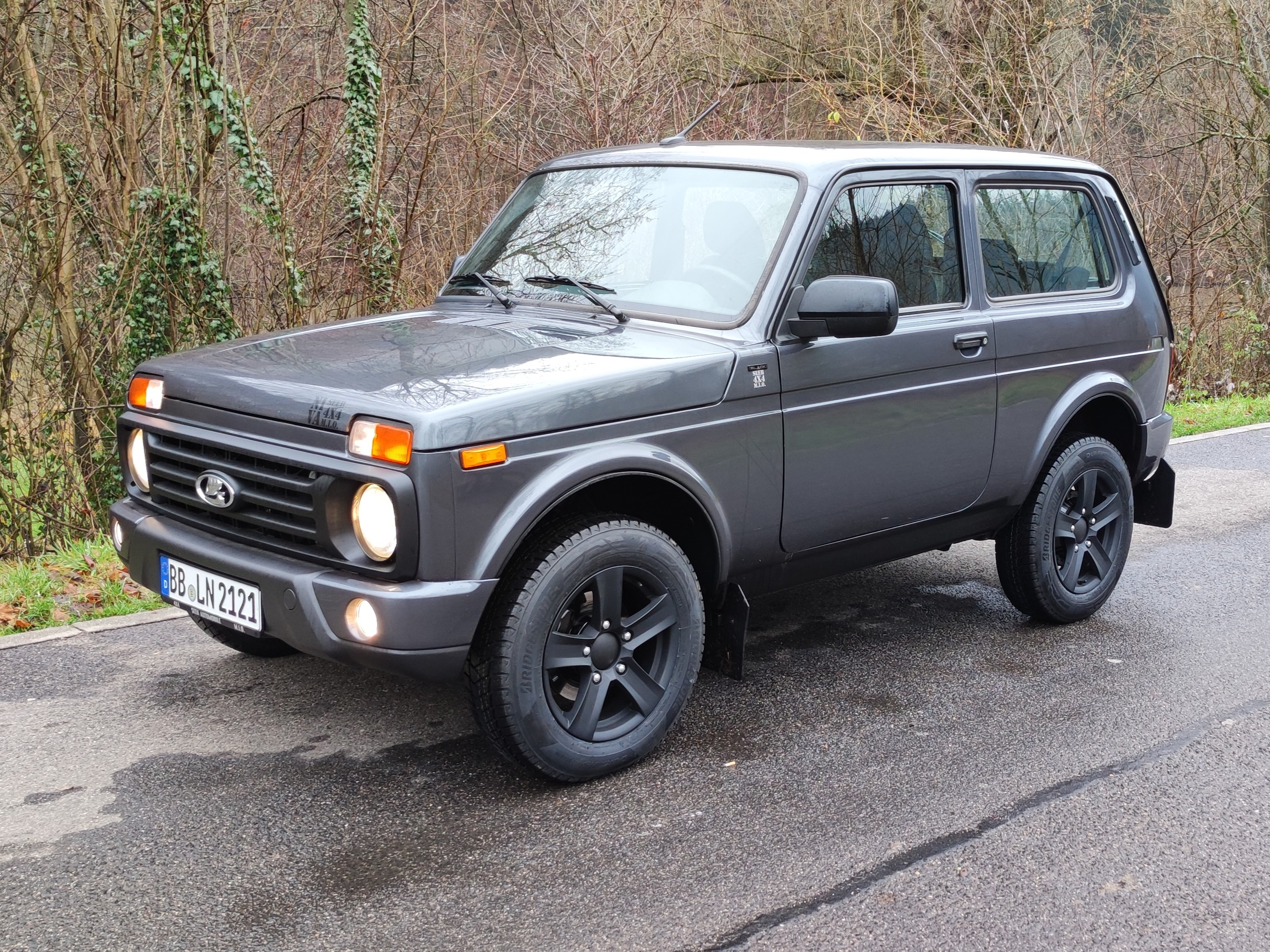
Lada 4x4 Urban

The Lada Niva was formally renamed Lada 4×4 in 2006 as the Niva name was reserved for the new Chevrolet Niva. This version has a low-range gearbox, differential lock, ABS, airbags, heated front seats, air conditioning, servomotor for the steering column, underbody protection. Prices for the model started at €10,990. It is available in five body styles: three- and five-door hatchbacks, two- and four-door pickups, and a two-door van. Two petrol engines were available – the standard 1.7-litre and the 1.8-litre (only for five-door model) along with a five-speed manual transmission.

Starting with the 2014 model year, the Niva nameplate was discontinued for the Russian market, and the vehicle is branded Lada 4×4 for both short and long wheelbases to make way for the upcoming restart of the Chevrolet Niva series, which was scheduled to start production by March 2015. Due to Russia–West economic relations, AvtoVAZ analysts suggested that the production of Chevrolet Niva may be delayed further into 2015.

== Engines ==
| Model name | Engine code | Capacity | Years | Type | Power | Torque | Fuel consumption | Notes |
Petrol
| 21211 | VAZ-21011 | 1294 cm³ | 1978–1987 | Carburetor | 44 kW (60 hp) | — | | |
| 2121 | VAZ-2121 | 1570 cm³ | 1977–1994 | Carburetor | 58.8 kW (80 hp) | 118 N⋅m | | |
| 21213 | VAZ-21213 | 1690 cm³ | 1994–2010 | Carburetor | 58 kW (79 hp) | — | | |
| 21214 | VAZ-21213 | 1690 cm³ | 1994–2010 | Multi-point fuel injection | 58.5 kW (80 hp) | — | | |
| 21218 | VAZ-21213 | 1690 cm³ | 1995–present | Carburetor | 56.1 kW (76 hp) | — | | Long-wheelbase three-door |
| 212183 | VAZ-21213 | 1690 cm³ | ?–present | Carburetor | 56.1 kW (76 hp) | — | | Landaulet |
| 21219 | VAZ-21213 | 1690 cm³ | 1991–1994 | Carburetor | 56.1 kW (76 hp) | — | | |
| 2129 | VAZ-21213 | 1690 cm³ | 1994–present | Carburetor | 56.1 kW (76 hp) | — | | Long-wheelbase three-door |
| 2131 | VAZ-21213 | 1690 cm³ | 1995–2001 | Carburetor | 56.1 kW (76 hp) | — | | Five-door |
| 21214 | VAZ-21214 | 1690 cm³ | 2010–present | Multi-point fuel injection | 61 kW (83 hp) | — | | |
| 2131 | VAZ-2130 | 1774 cm³ | 2001–present | Fuel injection | 58.5 kW (80 hp) | — | | |
| 1.8 | | 1774 cm³ | July 2026 – present | Fuel injection | 67 kW (90 hp) | 153 N⋅m | 9.0 L/100 km | |
| Sport | VAZ-21127 | 1596 cm³ | 2024–present | Fuel injection | 90 kW (122 hp) | 151 N⋅m | | |
Diesel
| 21215 | XUD9 | 1905 cm³ | 1995–1997 | Indirect injection | 55 kW (75 hp) | — | | |

== Second generation ==
=== 1998–2002 ===
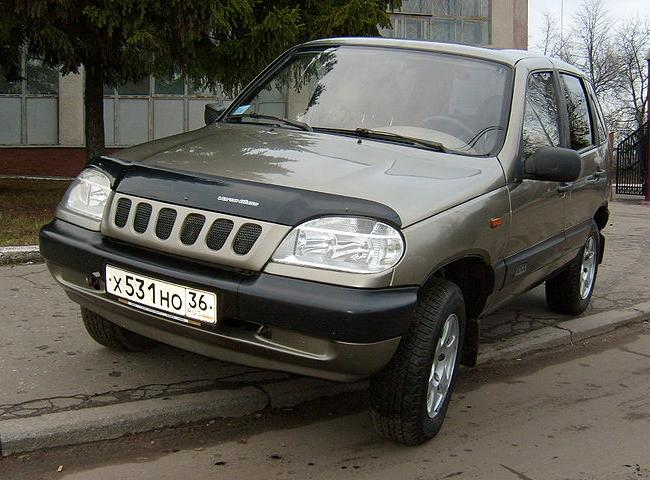
VAZ-2123 (1998–2002)

GM-AvtoVAZ, a joint venture between AvtoVAZ and General Motors, presented in 1998 the VAZ-2123, a new sport utility vehicle (SUV) based on the old VAZ 2121 engine, transmission and most mechanicals; but with a modern exterior design.

=== 2003–2019 ===
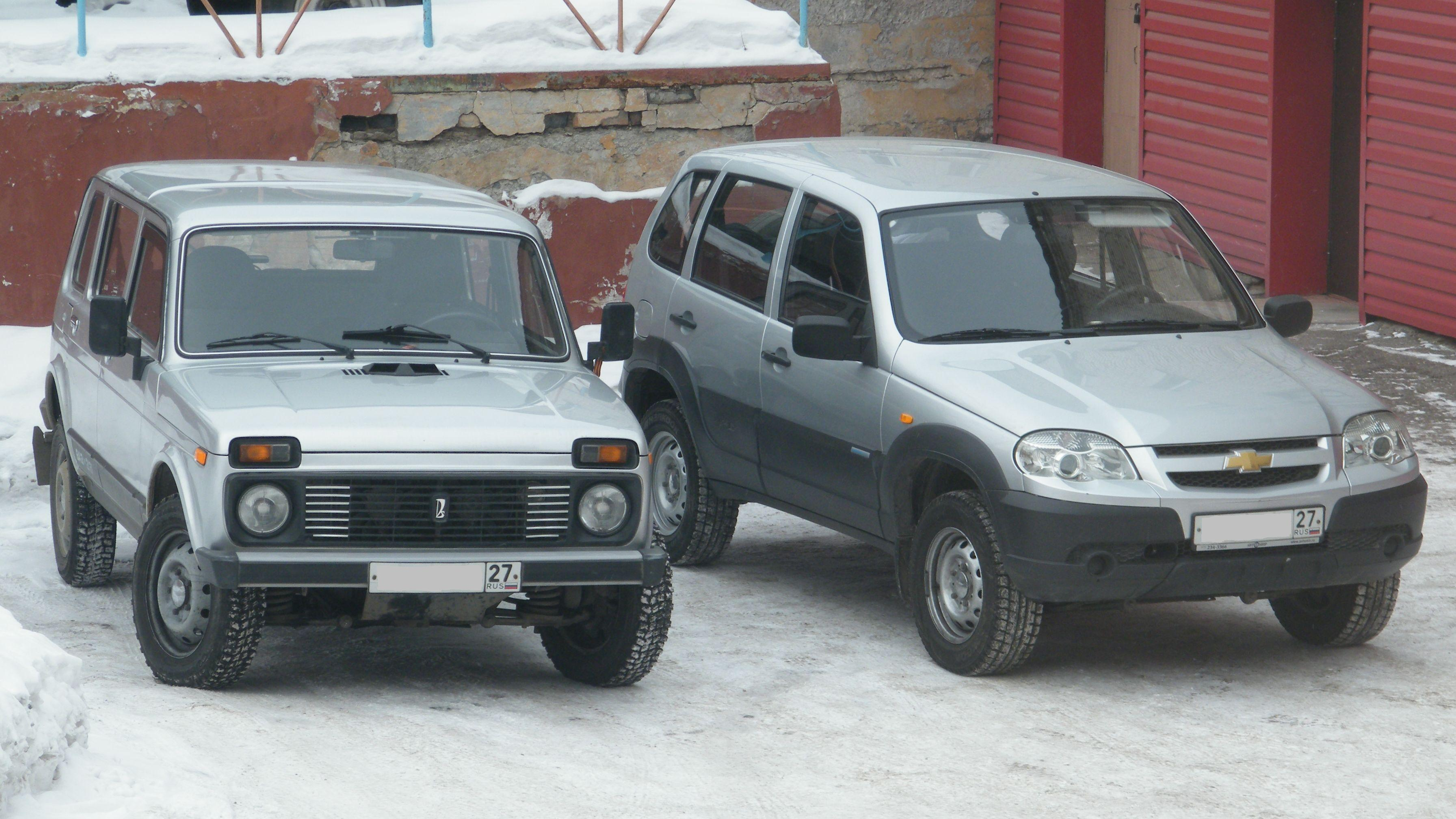
Lada 4x4 with Chevrolet Niva (2003–2019)

In 2003, the VAZ-2123 was rebadged as the Chevrolet Niva. It features an updated body and 1.7-litre gasoline engine with fuel injection. Although the body and the interiors are new, it is still based on the old VAZ-2121 engine, transmission, and most mechanicals. Its off-road ability is exemplary compared with many modern budget SUVs, having been designed for tough tundra territory.

=== 2020–present ===
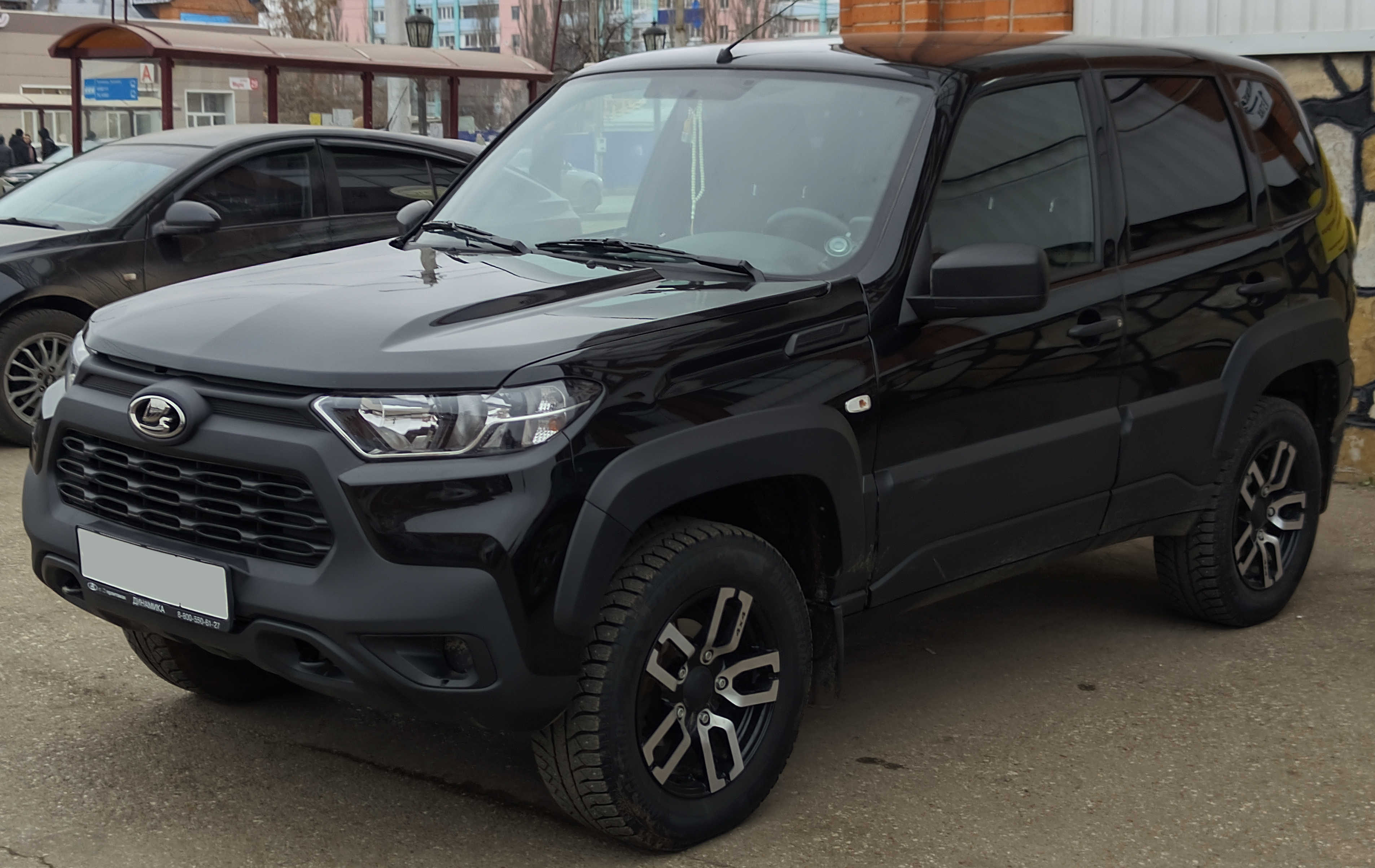
Lada Niva Travel (2021–present)

In 2019 Lada acquired General Motors' stake in GM-AvtoVAZ and then announced that the Chevrolet Niva would be produced under Lada's name. The rebranded Lada Niva was revealed by AvtoVAZ in July 2020, with the firm saying that there was still strong demand for the 20 year old line of cars. The 2020 model is produced at the Togliatti factory with minor design updates (but no technical changes) and joins the Lada 4×4 in the firm's range.

In December 2020, following a new generation of the line, the new Lada Niva was further rebranded as Lada Niva Travel, while the old Lada 4x4 was rebranded as the Lada Niva Legend in January 2021.

== Safety by modern standards ==
In 2002, the Lada Niva was awarded zero stars out of a possible four by the Russian ARCAP safety-assessment program. The reviewer noted the very rugged body of the car as the only positive aspect in terms of safety. During the safety test, the passenger dummy was hit by the glove compartment hard enough to risk traumatic brain injury.

The reviewers noted that they did not expect a high rating and that the result was natural, as "it would be naive to believe that a 30-year-old design complies with modern requirements for passive safety". They added that a complete modernization of the car would be required to comply with modern safety standards.

== Uses ==
The Niva was the first wheeled vehicle to spend more than 10 years in Antarctica, where the classic VAZ-2121 Niva (Lada Niva 1600) was used by the Soviet Antarctic Expedition for transportation of personnel and goods, communication between Antarctic stations, and towing boats. It covered more than 40,000 km (25,000 mi) in 1990–2001 and operated at temperatures as low as −54 °C. A Niva also reached the North Pole in 1998, when the lengthened VAZ-2131 Niva was dropped by parachute on ice and successfully completed its route, operating at an average temperature of −30 °C, becoming the first wheeled vehicle to spend time there. It also set the world record of the highest point ever reached by a motorized vehicle, when another VAZ-2131 climbed to the 5200-m-high base camp on Mount Everest in 1998 and even higher just a year later, on 16 September 1999, when a similar Niva belonging to the Saint Petersburg extreme expedition team reached a height of 5725 m on a Tibet mountain during off-roading.

While primarily built as a civilian vehicle, the simplicity and offroad performance of the Lada Niva has also seen the vehicle being adopted for military use, often with extensive modifications.

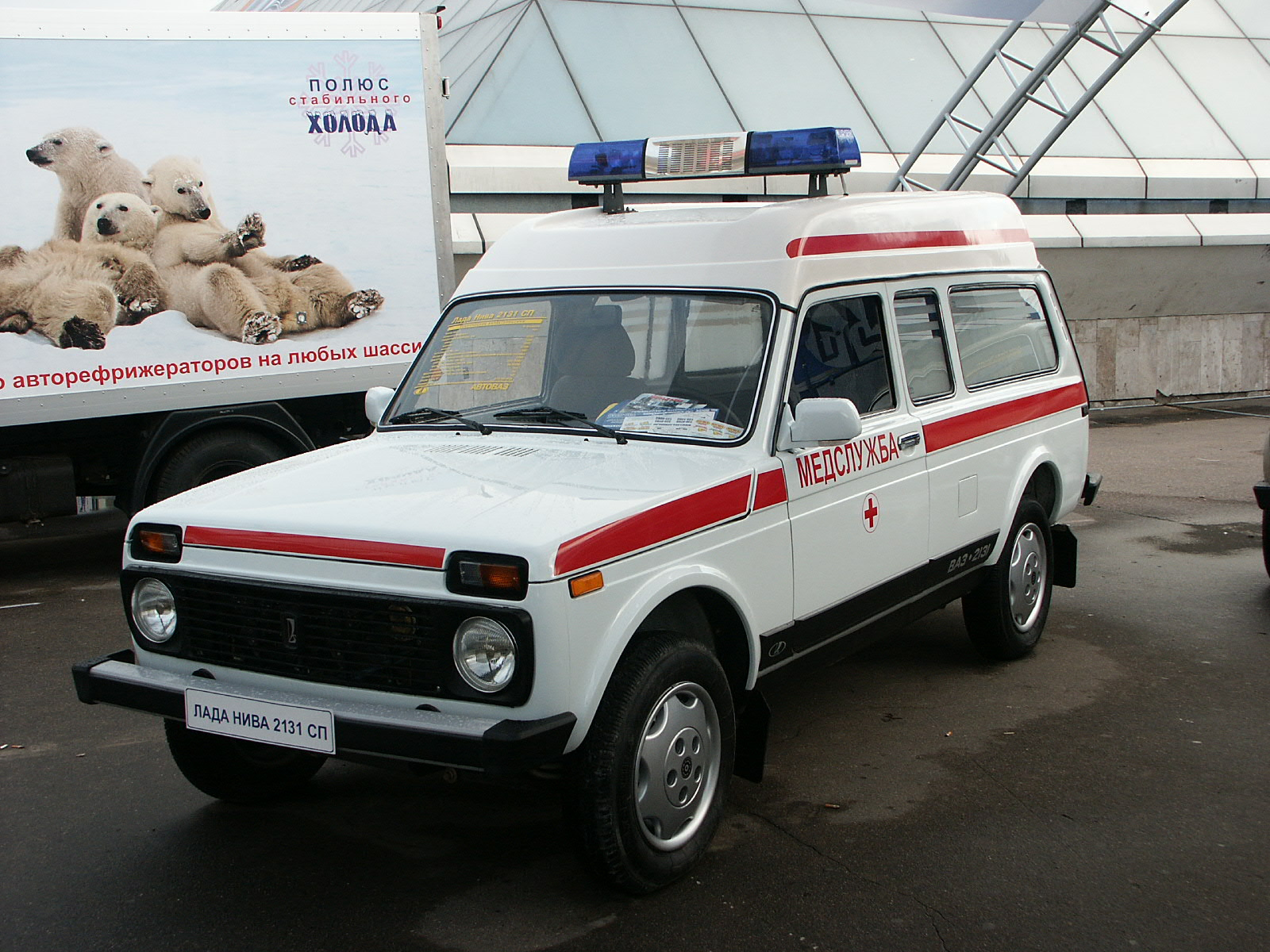
Lada Niva 2131СП ambulance

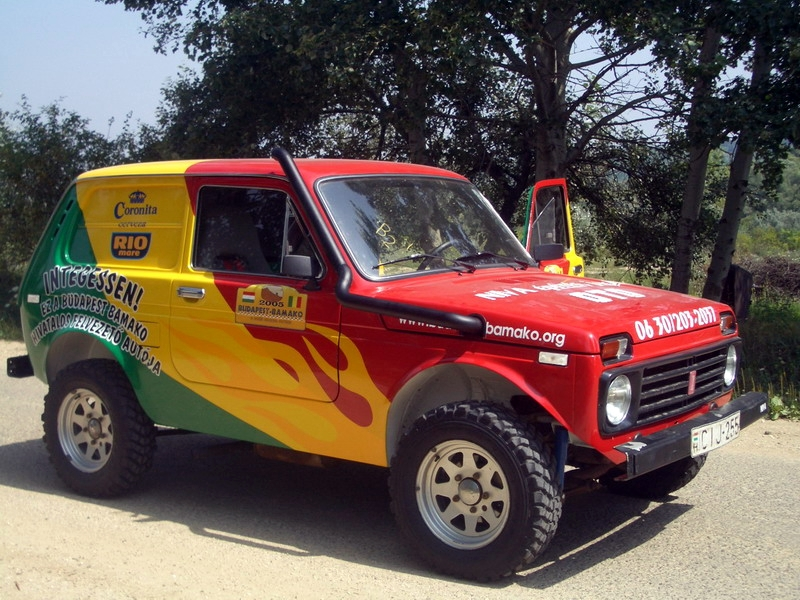
The official pace car of the Budapest-Bamako is a refurbished 1988 Lada Niva

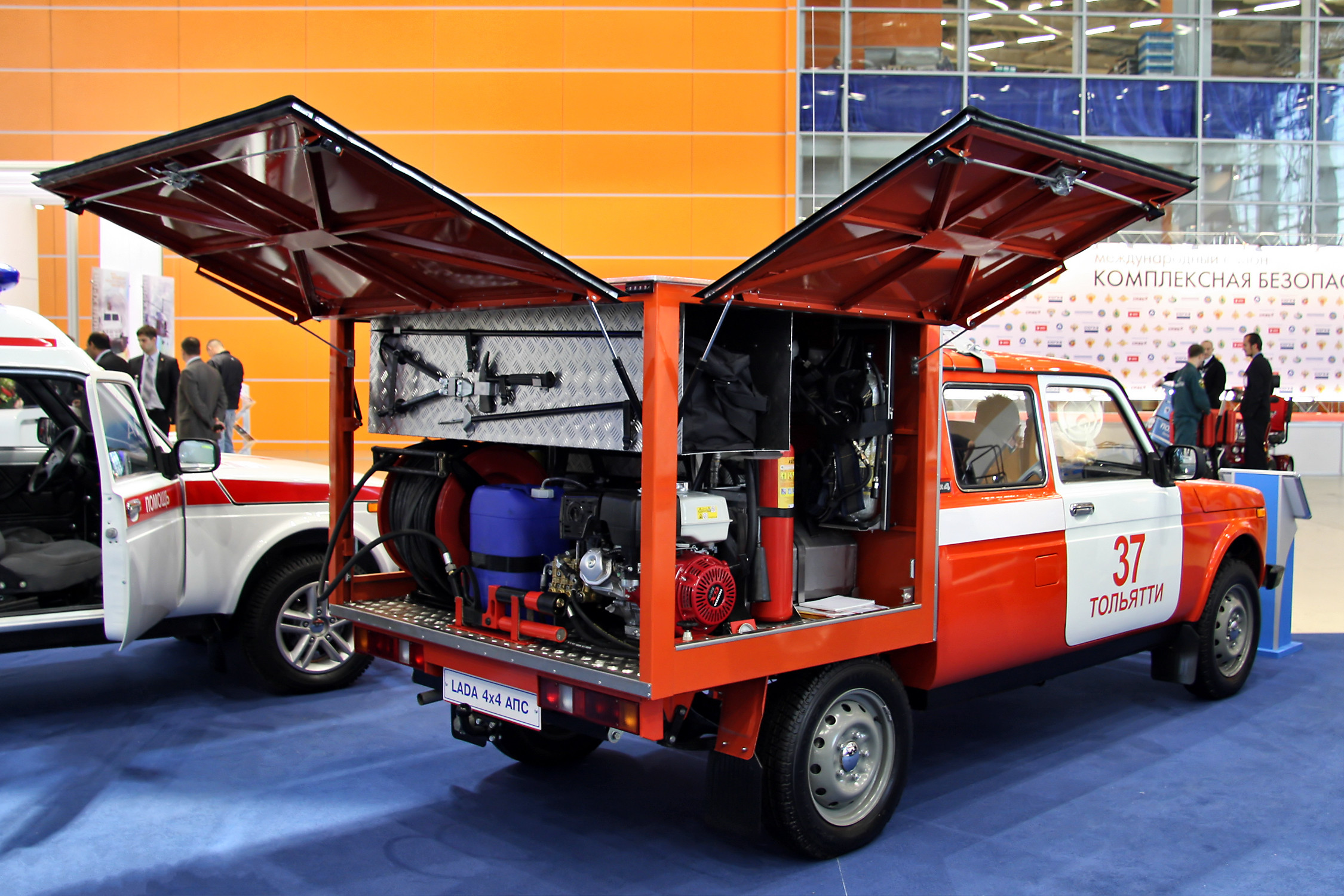
Lada Niva fire appliance

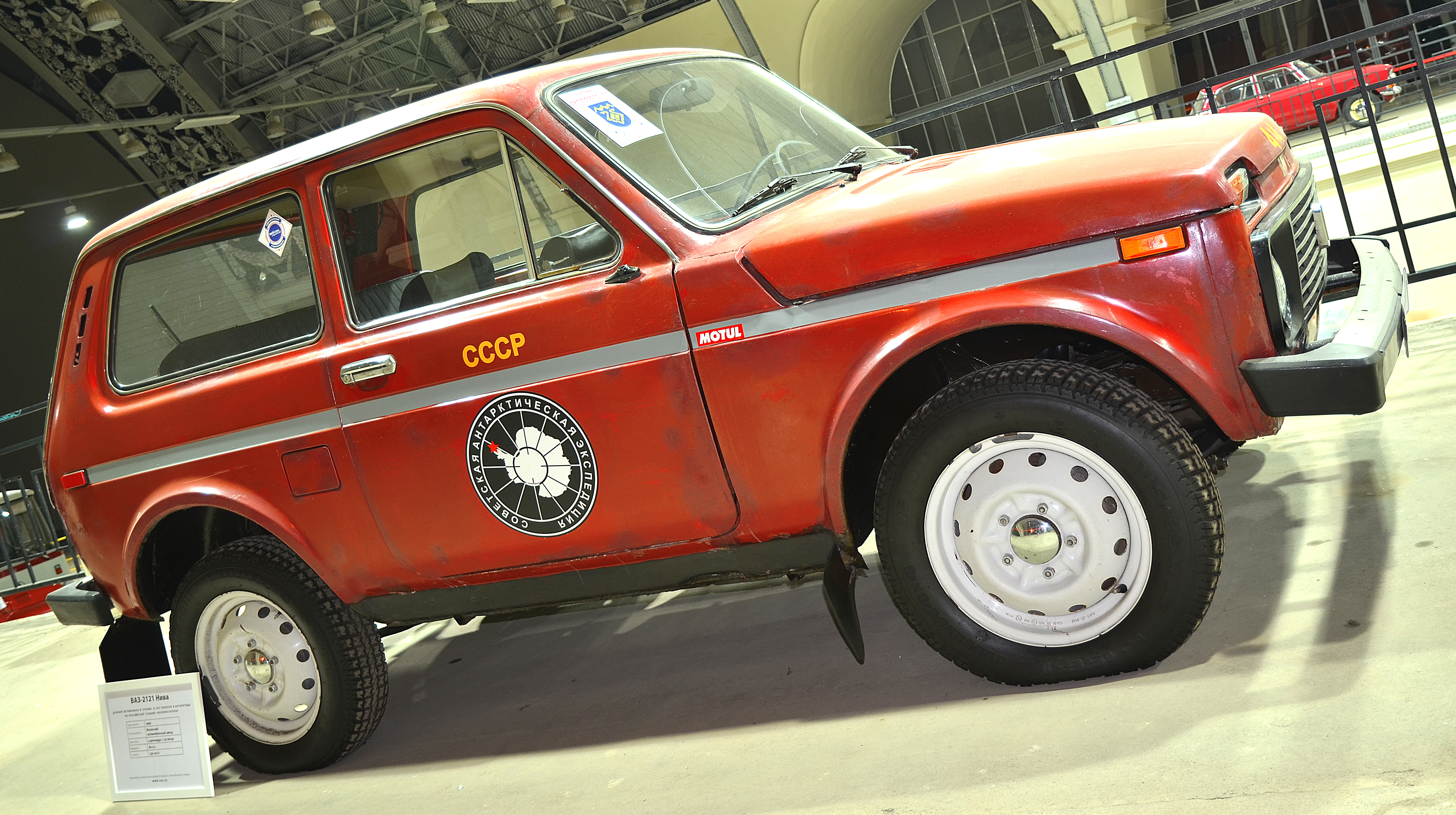
Lada Niva used by the Soviet Antarctic Expedition

== Assembly outside Russia ==
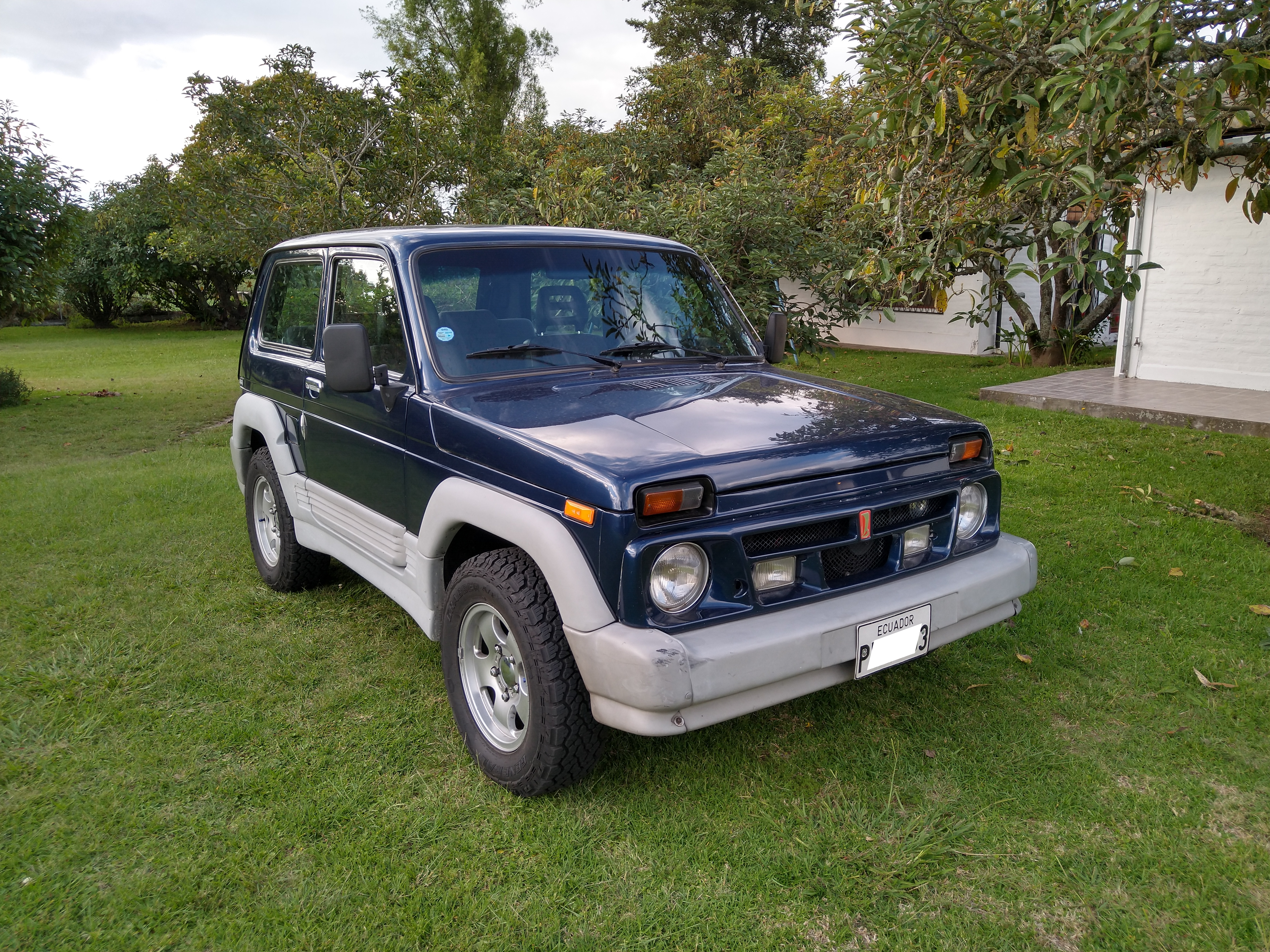
2001 Lada Niva assembled in Ecuador

Automeccanica assembled different versions of the Lada Niva in the late 1980s and early 1990s, including an in-house developed convertible version.

The Lada Niva was also assembled in Ecuador by Aymesa between December 2000 and 2004. In Uruguay, a vehicle armorer called Bognor (a subsidiary of PSA assemblers Oferol) teamed up with Latin American VAZ concessionaires Rusia Automotriz in 2002 to assemble armored Lada Nivas locally, calling them the Bognor Diva. The armouring parts were made locally, and all Divas were fitted with Peugeot's 1.9-litre, 69 PS (51 kW) diesel engine. Around 500 examples were built between 2003 and 2007 (192 knock-down kits were sent in 2003, the first year), with about 400 of them sold to Cuba.

== Concept cars ==
=== Chevrolet Niva Concept (2014) ===
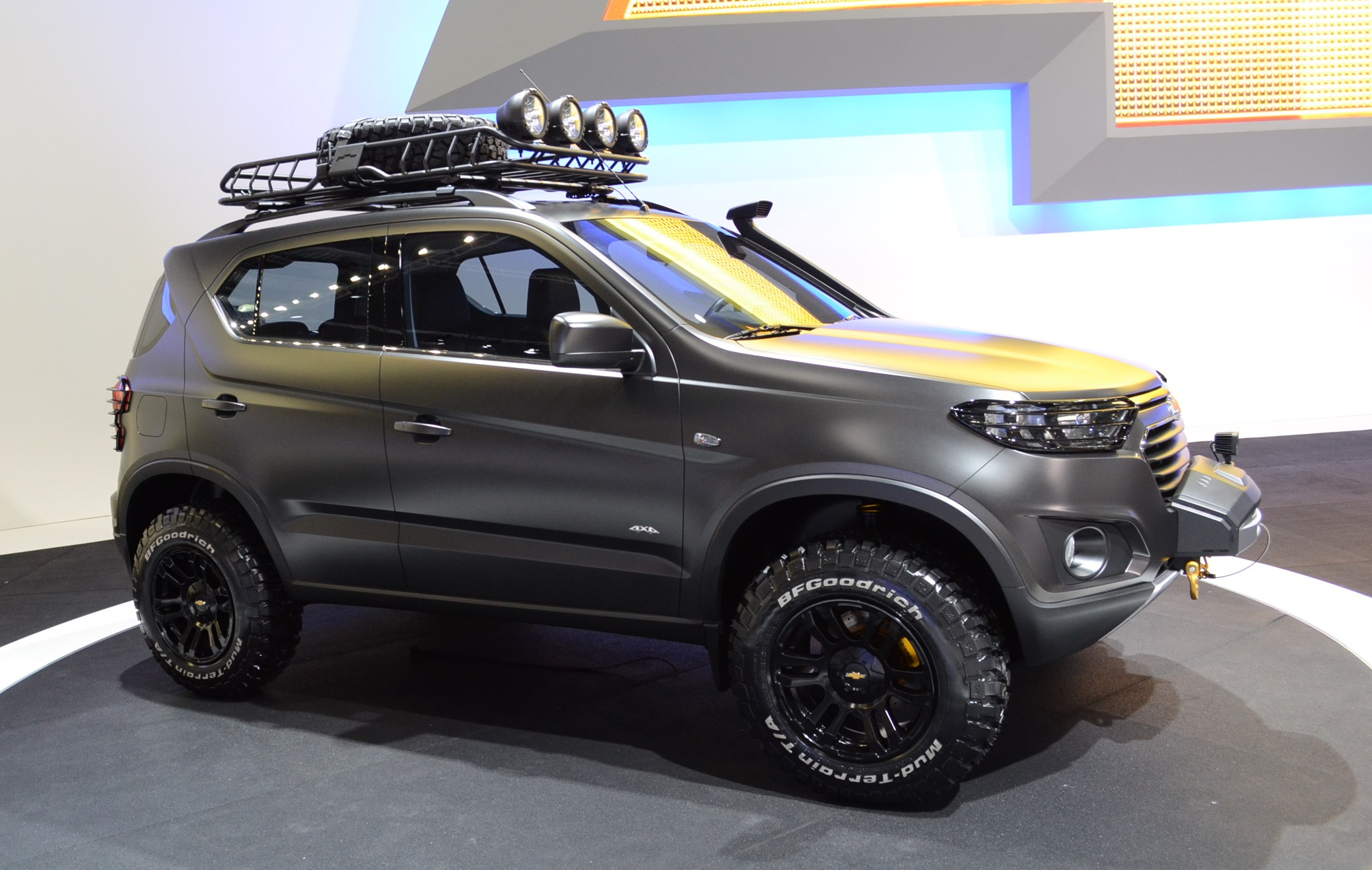
Chevrolet Niva Concept (2014)

GM-AvtoVAZ introduced a concept vehicle for a new generation of the Chevrolet Niva at the Moscow International Automobile Salon in late August 2014. The Niva Concept, designed by Ondrej Koromház of GM (or at General Motors' headquarters in Melbourne according to other sources), had a longitudinal mounted engine, full-time four-wheel-drive, two-gear transfer case and rigid-axle rear suspension. The production model was supposed to get a 1.8-liter PSA Peugeot Citroën EC8 engine (135 hp) paired with a 5-speed manual gearbox, although more recent news reports suggested that it was planned to be based on the Renault Duster platform. The new model's production version was initially expected in 2016, but following Chevrolet stopping sales of its mainstream models in Russia, no further information has been released on the topic.

In September 2018, it was reported that GM has suspended all the work on planned replacement of Chevrolet Niva.

=== Lada 4x4 Vision Concept (2018) ===
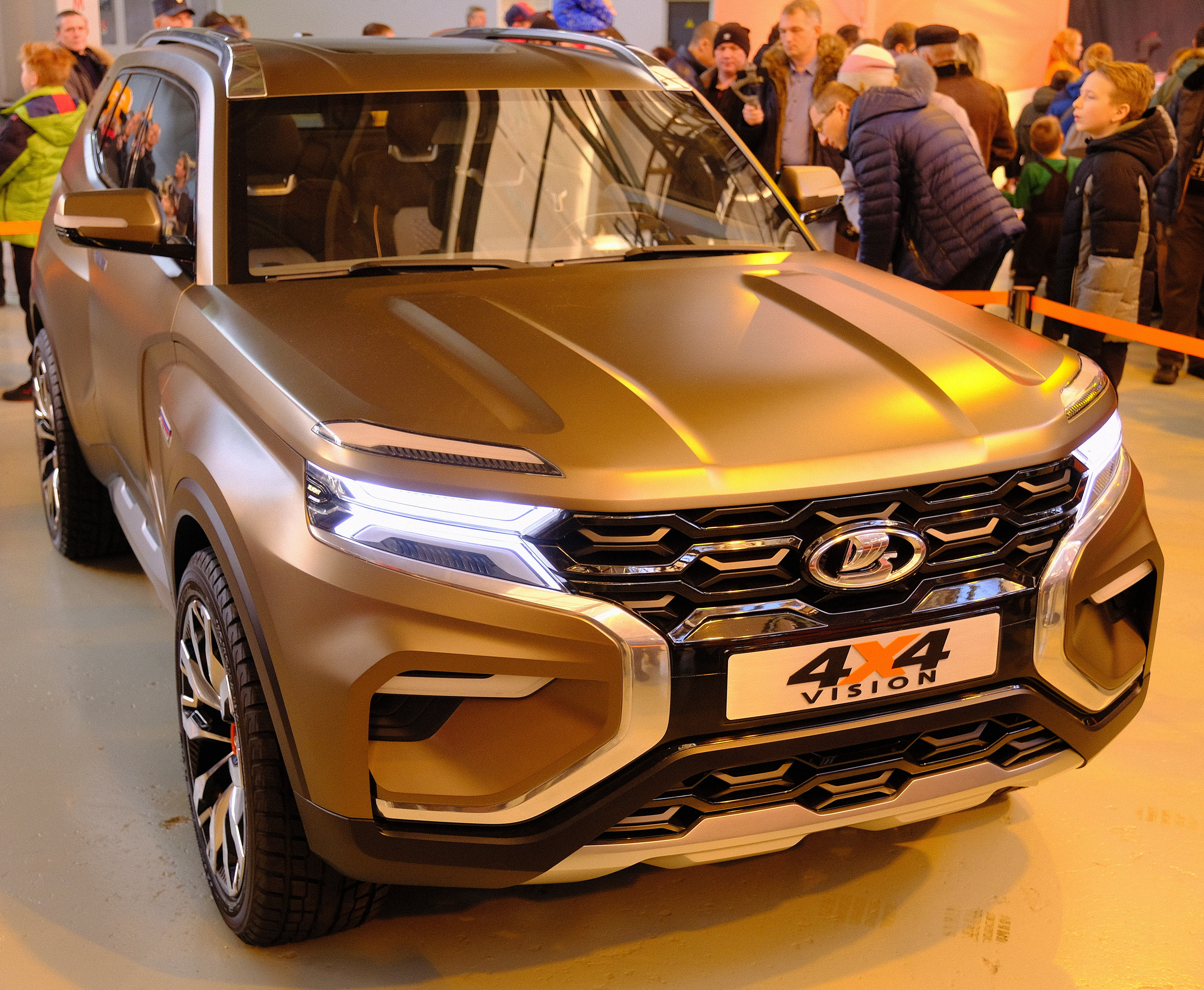
Lada 4x4 Vision Concept (2018)

AvtoVAZ began work on a third generation Niva based on the Renault–Nissan Common Module Family (CMF), unified with the Dacia Duster and Dacia Bigster. In May 2018, AvtoVAZ presented the new concept car called the Lada Niva Vision. In January 2021, renders of the vehicle were shared by AvtoVAZ in January, showing a design that closely resembled the Lada Niva Vision, while incorporating a number of design elements from the original vehicle. However, work on the project was halted following the divestment of AvtoVAZ from Renault, amid the fallout of the Russo-Ukrainian war.

=== Lada T-134 (2025) ===
In 2023, news emerged that AvtoVAZ had resumed development of a next generation model independently, reportedly based on the Lada Vesta . In 2025, a new concept vehicle named the T-134 was demonstrated to President Vladimir Putin during a visit to Tolyatti. It was suggested that the name may be in reference to the Tupolev Tu-134, a Soviet airliner. In 2026, further details emerged following the filing of a patent to the Federal Service for Intellectual Property. Autostat reported that pre-production vehicles were undergoing testing, while production facilities were in the process of being upgraded to facilitate the new model.

== Modifications ==
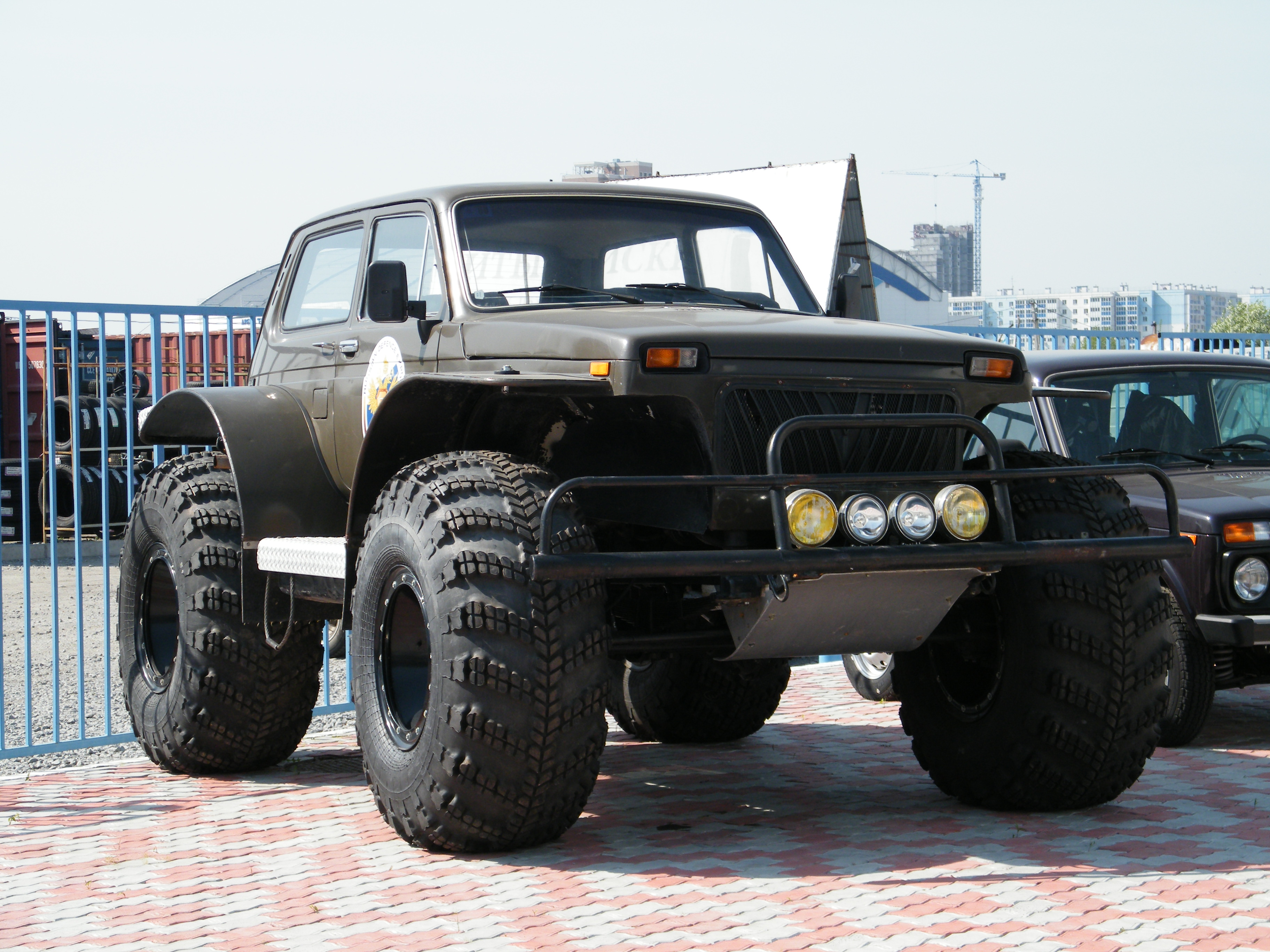
Lada 4x4 Bronto March-1 (VAZ-1922)

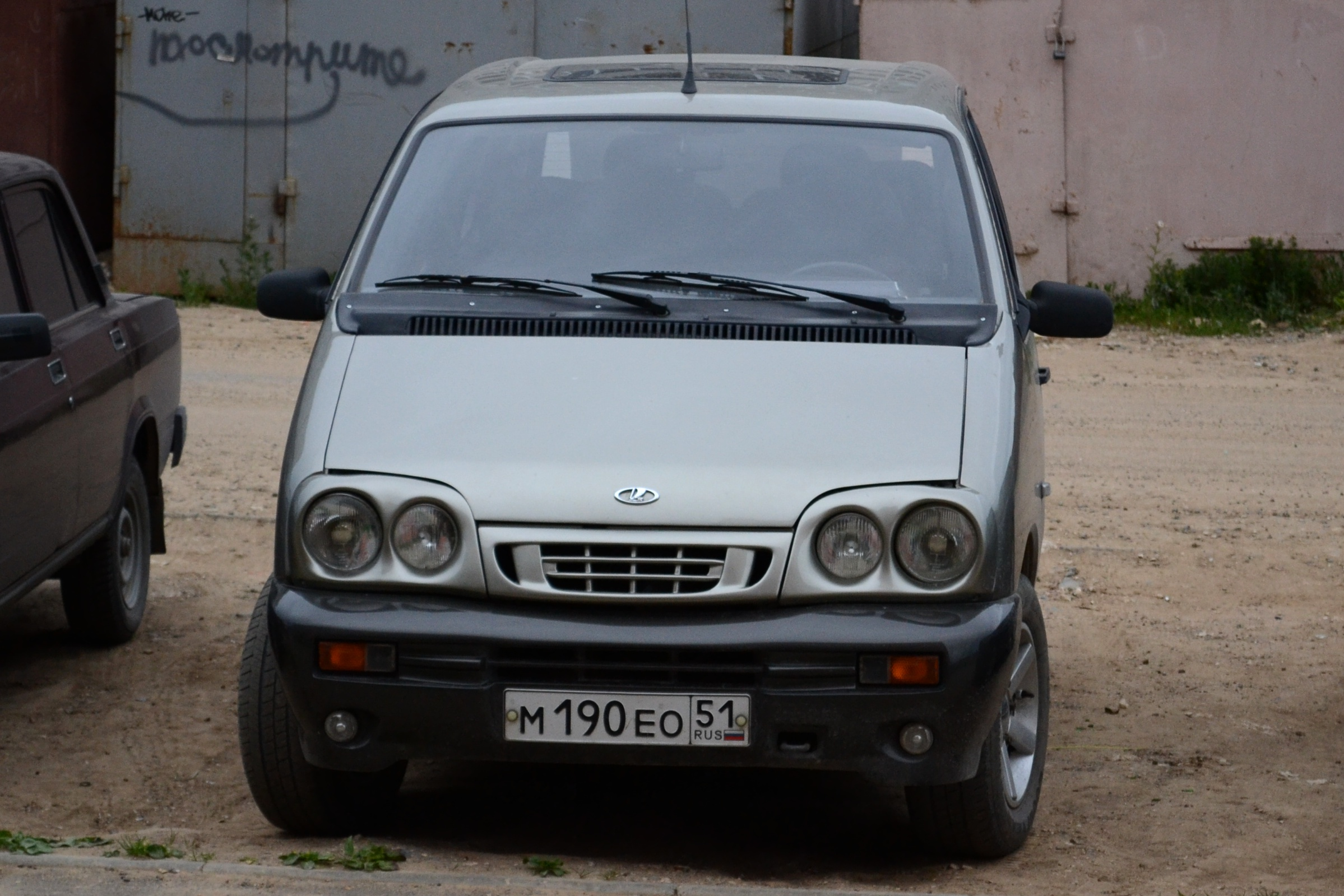
Lada Nadezhda «Фора» Hope

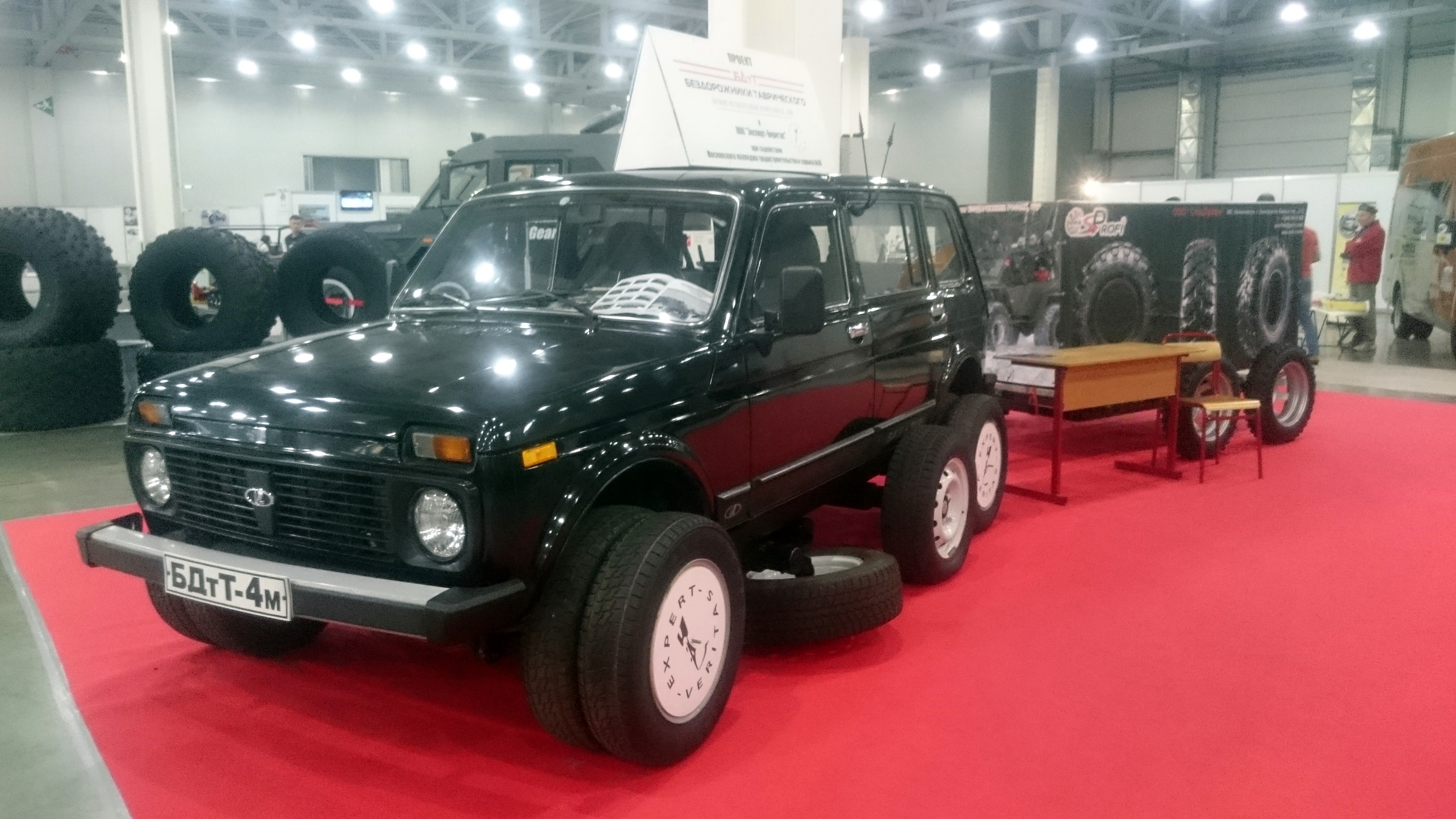
Niva with BRDM-2-style modification

=== Short/regular versions ===
==== Lada 4×4 Urban ====
A version of the base three-door car, it sports updated bumpers, grille, steering wheel, and some additional options: power and heated mirrors, power windows, air conditioning, and alloy wheels. The car has been produced by VIS-Auto since October 2014.

=== Vehicles based on the Niva ===
==== VAZ-1922 Bronto "March-1" ====
Bronto March is one of the few mass-produced vehicles on ultra-large-diameter pneumatic wheels. A production is being made by the PSA Bronto in Tolyatti since 1997. In the first 8 years of production, about 350 cars were produced.

==== APAL-21541 "Stalker" ====
A modification based on the VAZ-21214, it was planned for series production at the plant "Pishchemash" in the city of Argun, Chechen Republic. This short run is made by LLC "APAL" since 2003.

=== Long versions ===
Niva with BRDM-2-style modification.

== Notable owners ==
Vladimir Putin bought a Niva in May 2009. He showed his camouflage-painted Opel-engined offroader in the Russian media, allegedly to support domestic car producers despite the 2008 financial crisis.

Serbian football player Aleksandar Kolarov received a certificate for a Lada 4×4/Niva as a reward for scoring a goal in his team's match against Costa Rica during the Russia 2018 World Cup.

== Gallery ==
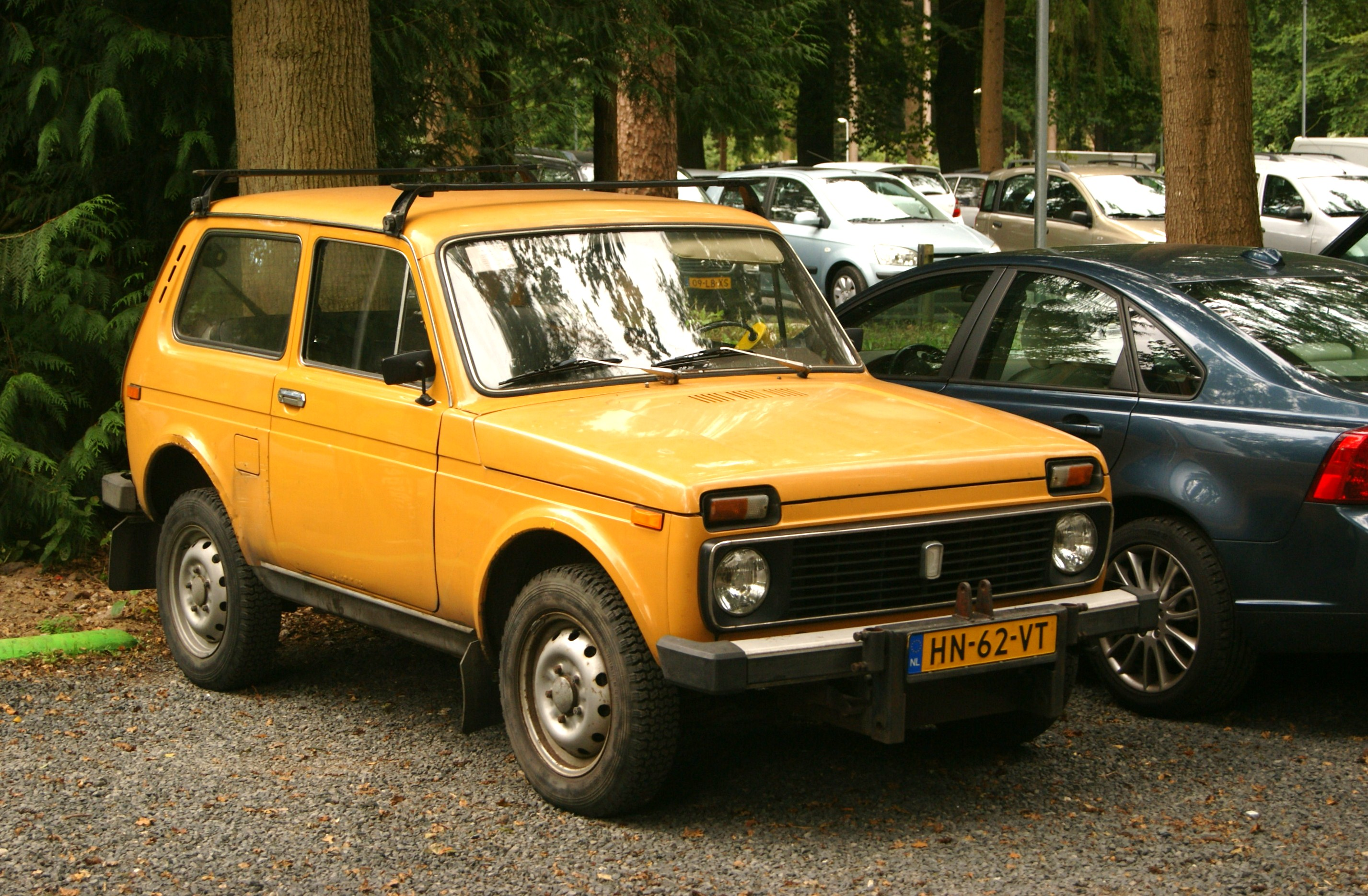
Lada Niva front view

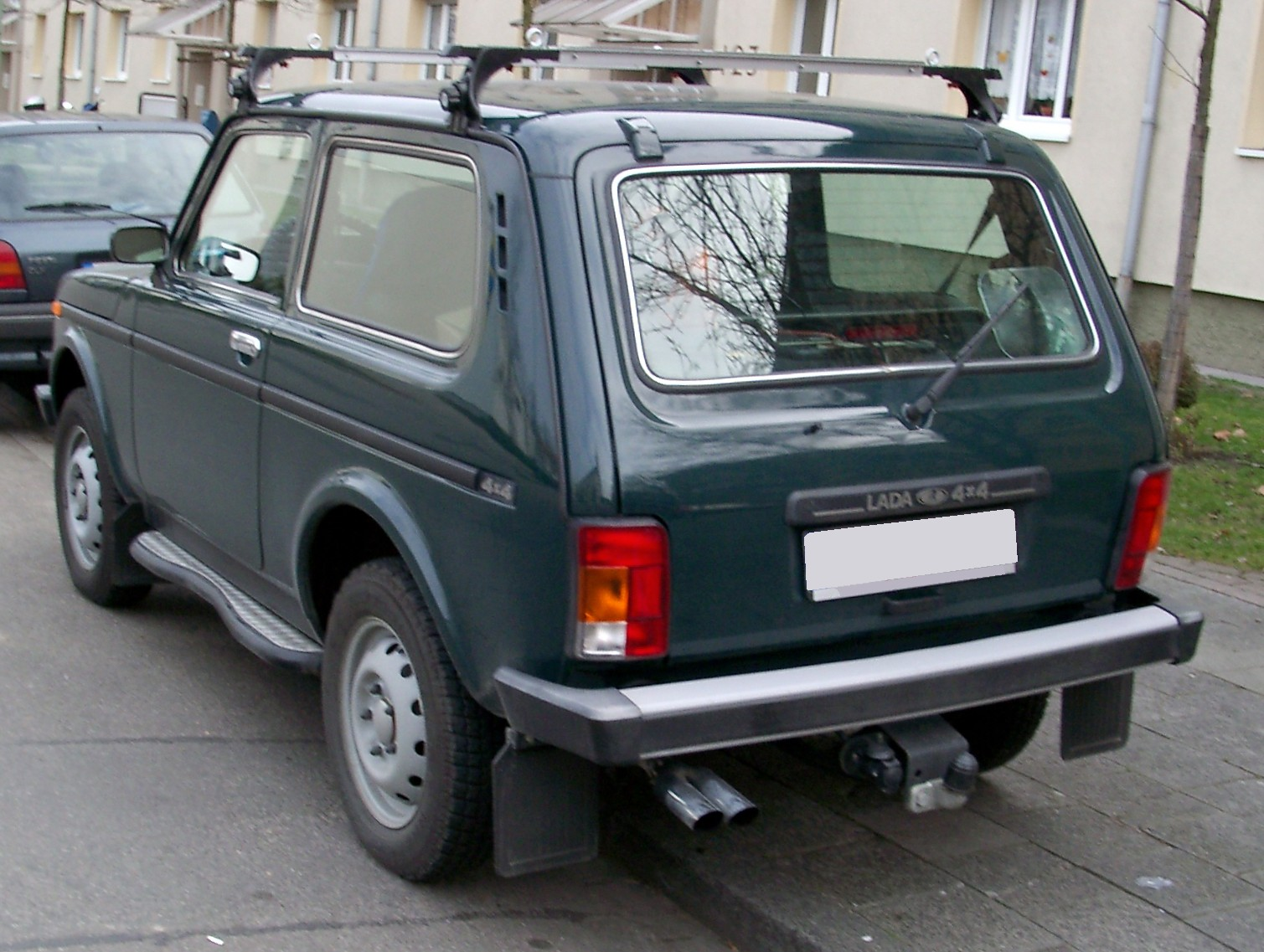
Lada Niva rear (with new lights)

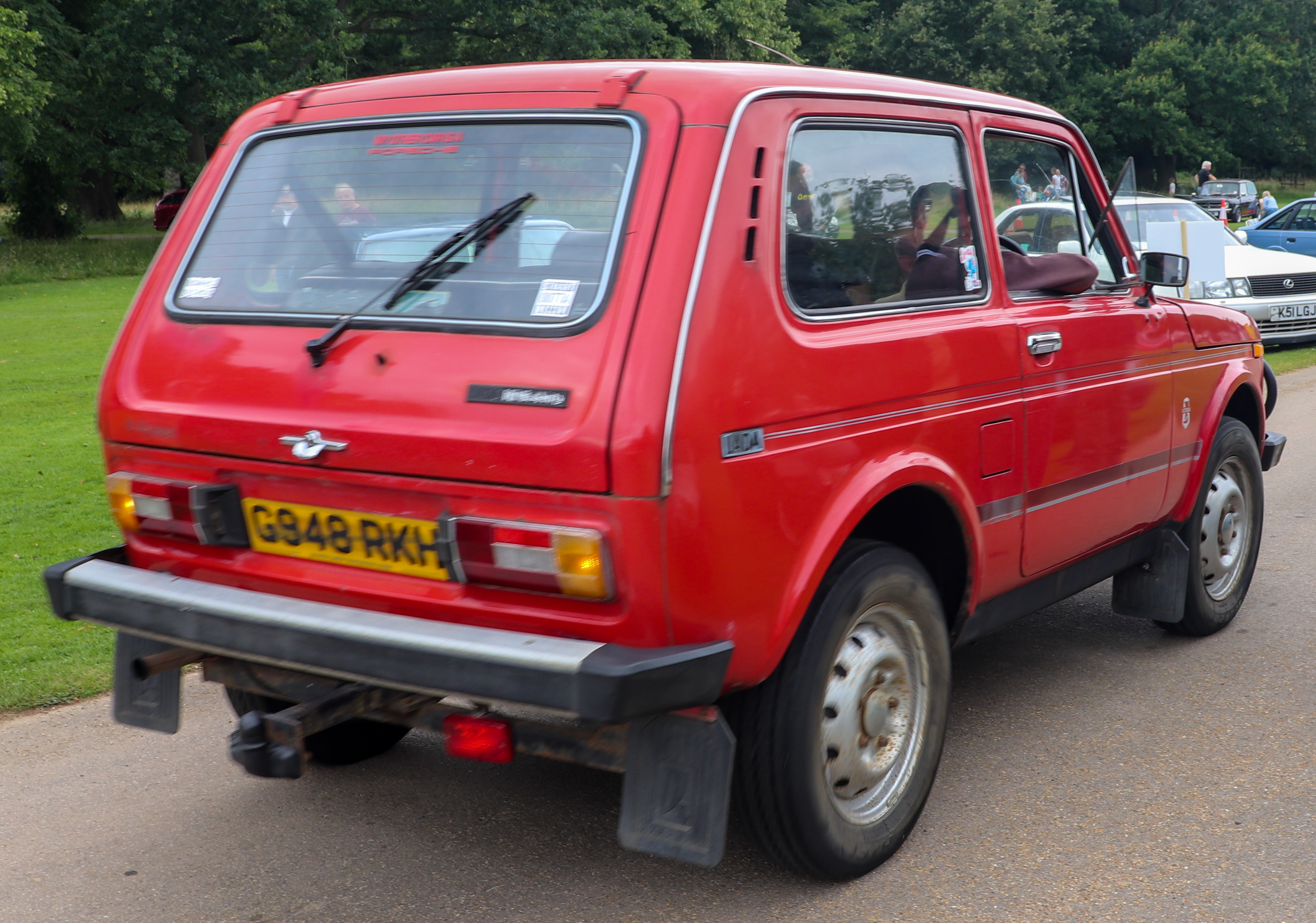
Lada Niva rear (with old lights)

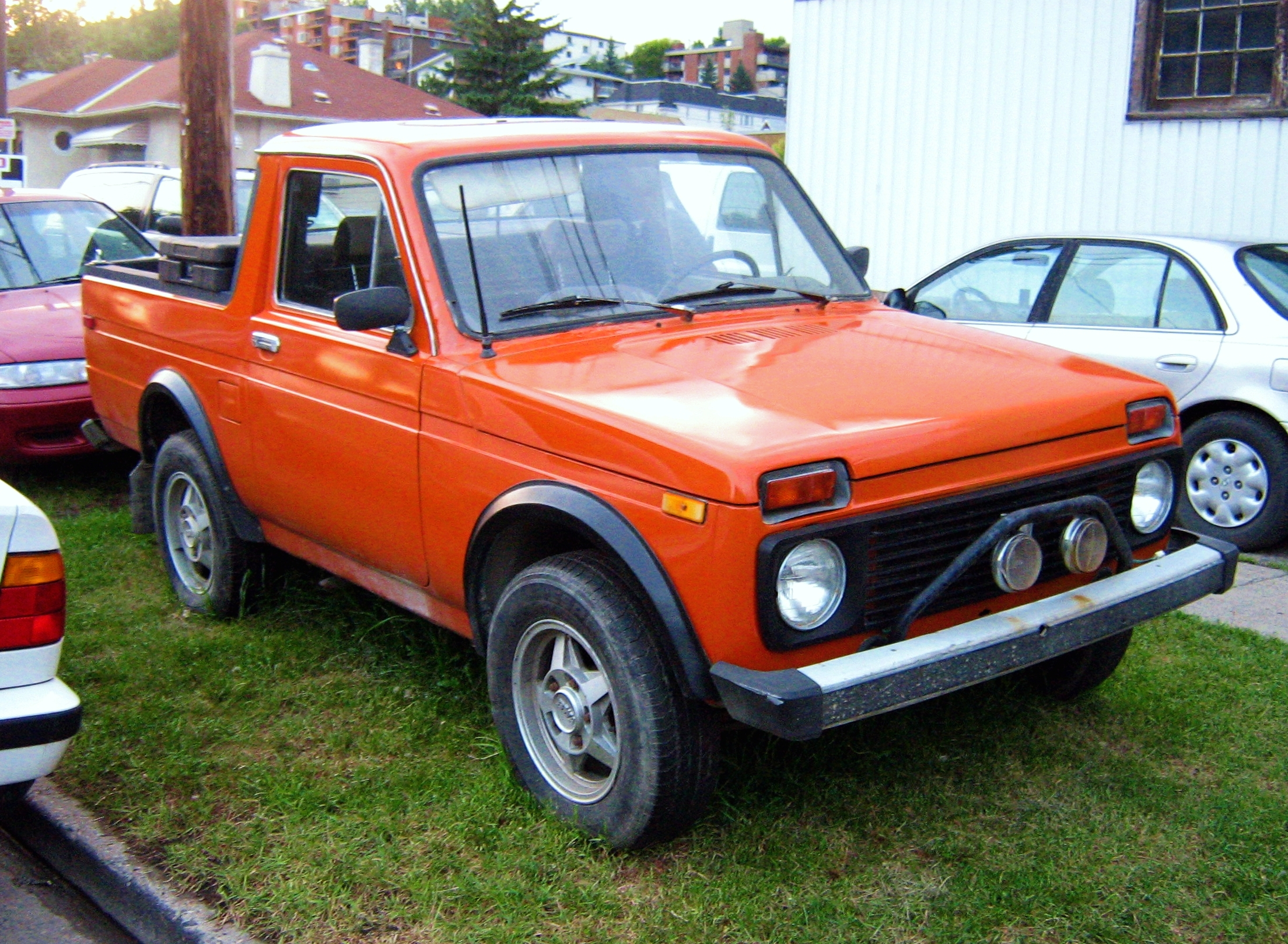
Canadian VAZ-2121 customized to Truck.

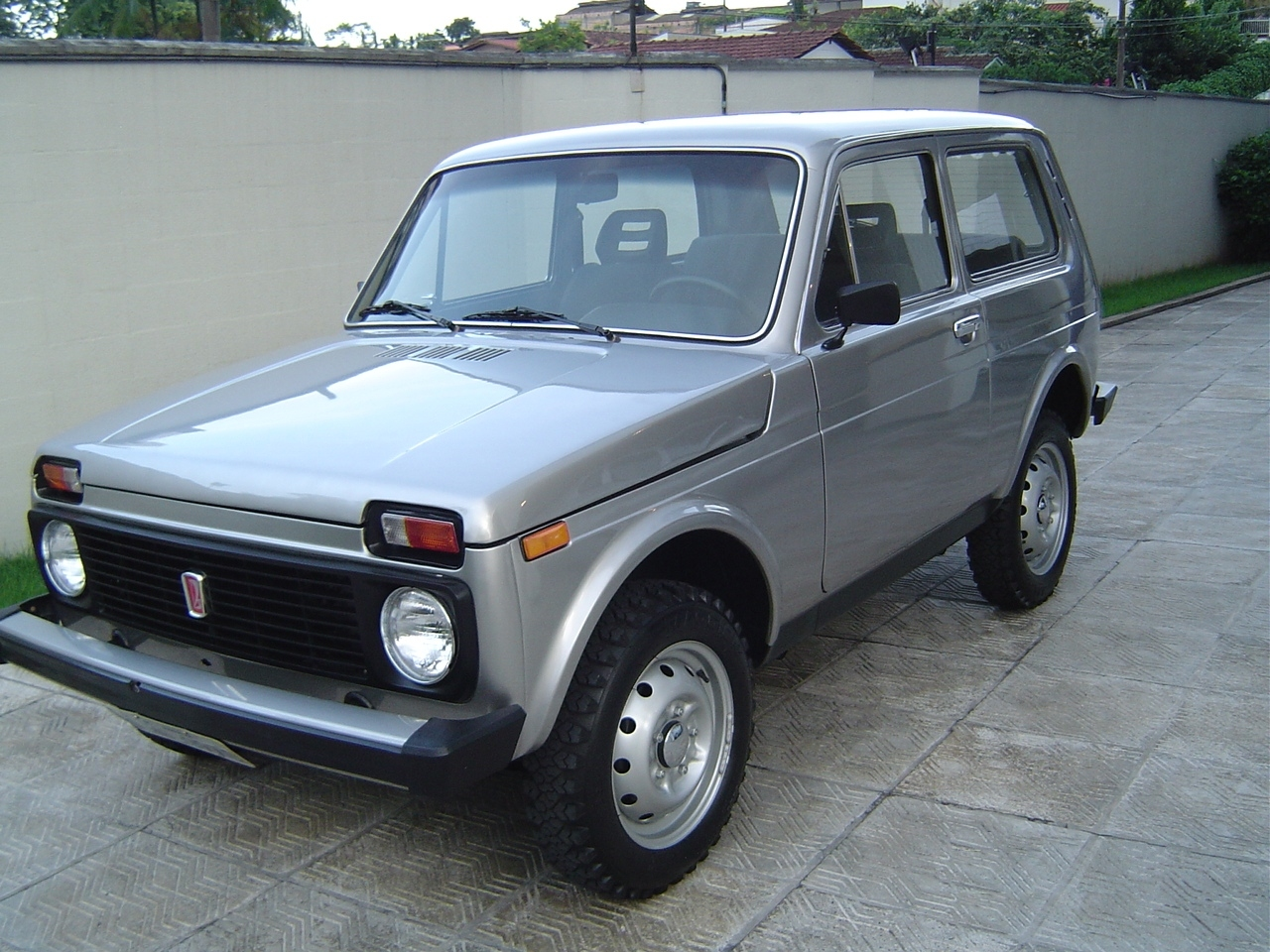
1991 Lada Niva in Brazil

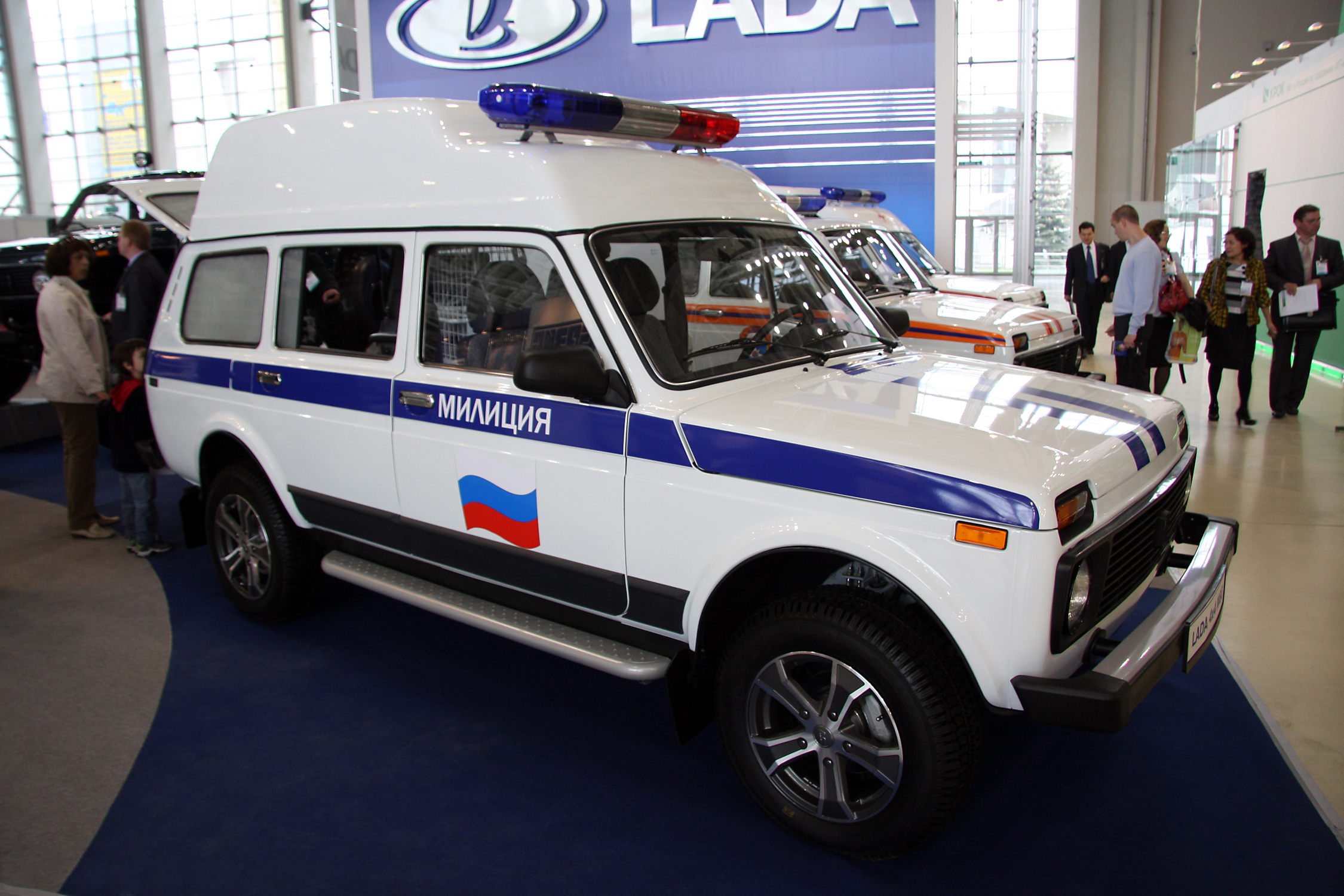
VAZ-2131 as a police car

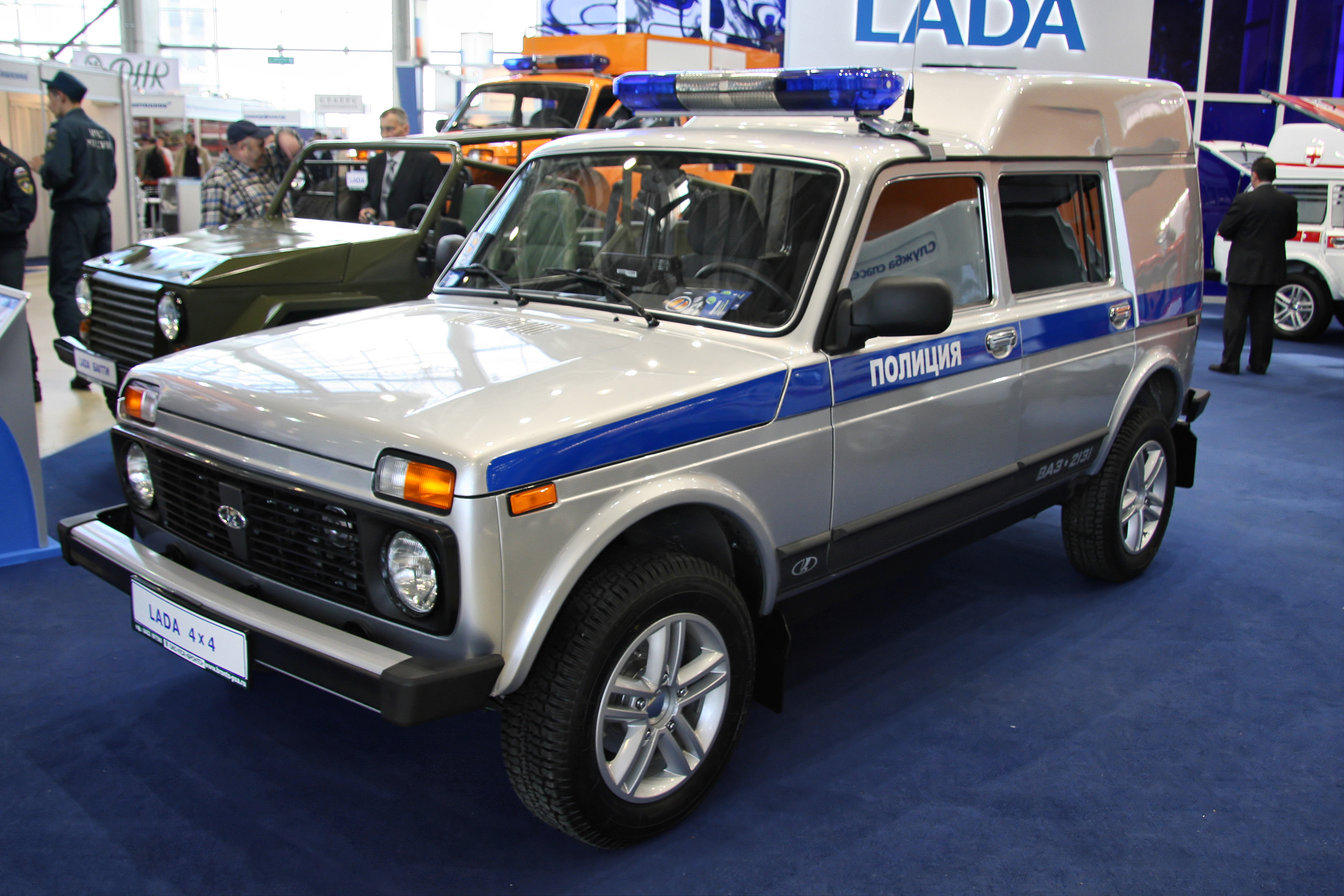

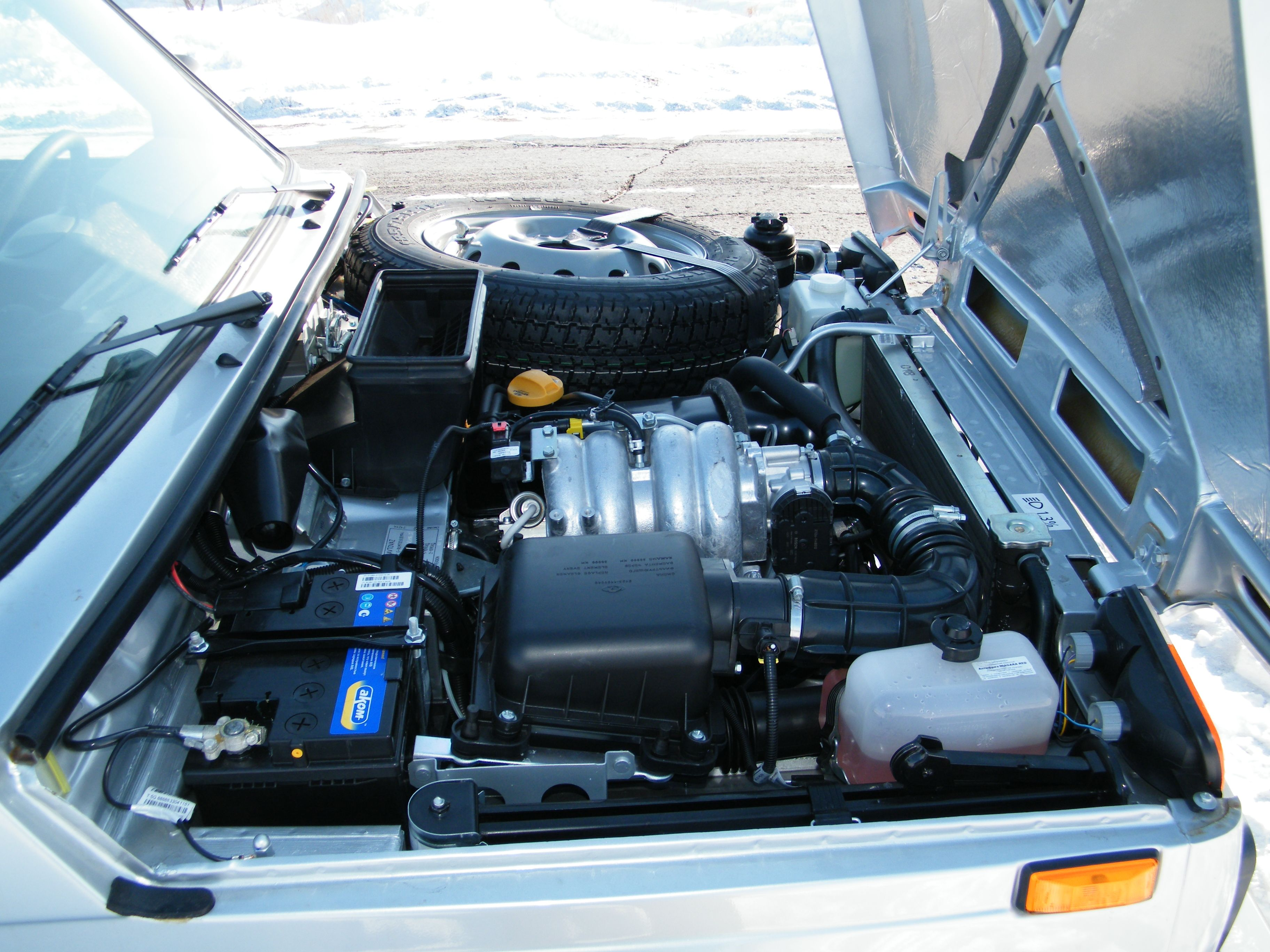
VAZ-2131 Engine

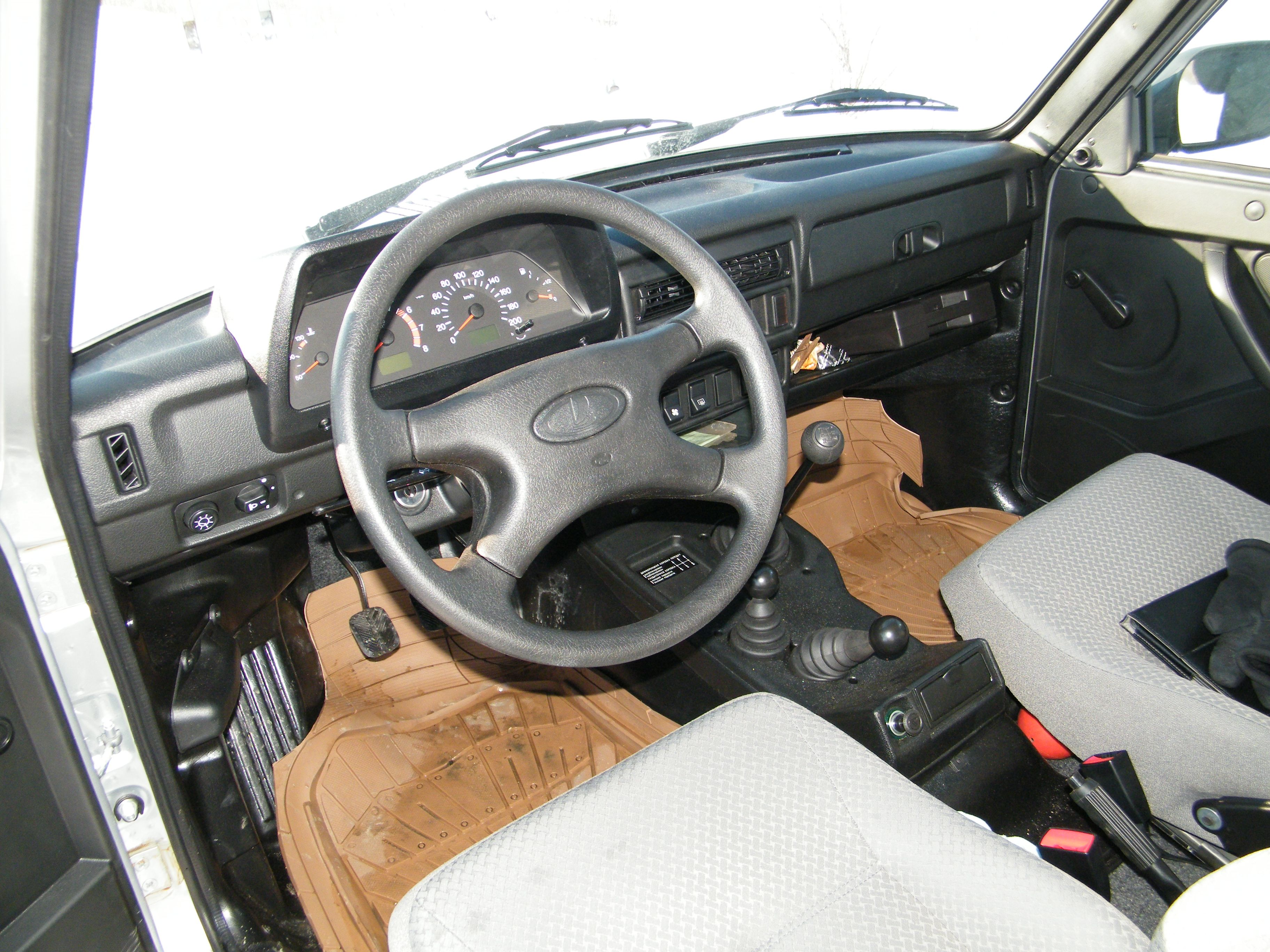
VAZ-2131 Dashboard

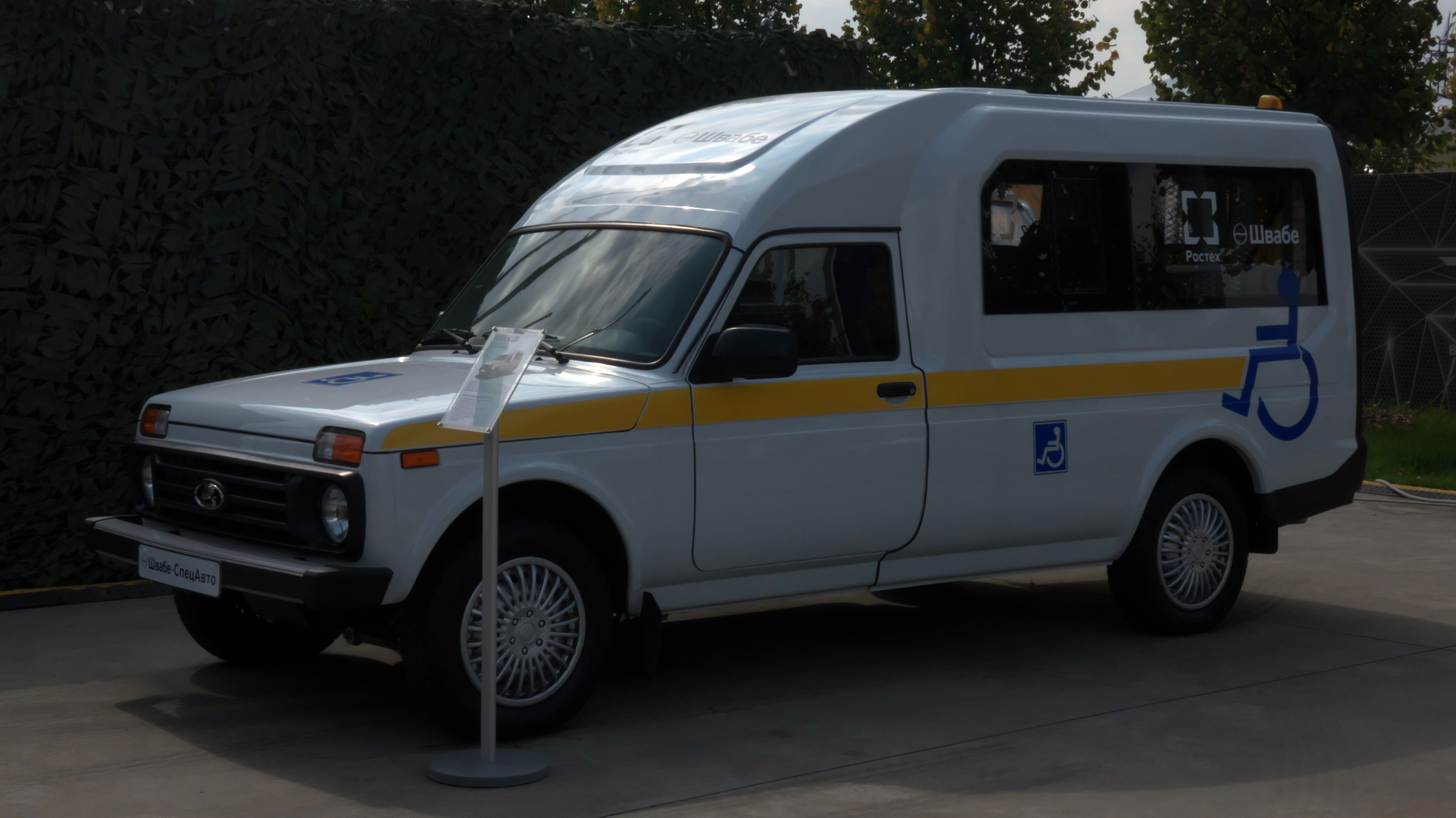
Niva "Kub"
