= Automeccanica =

Defunct Greek automobile manufacturer

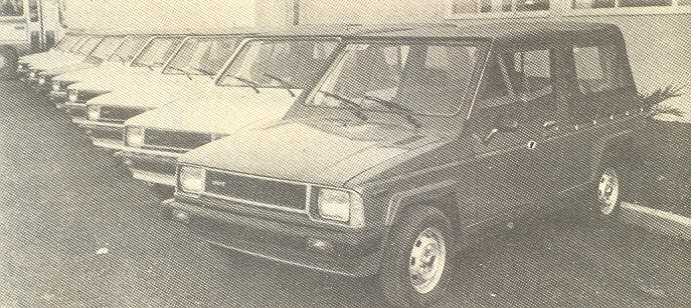
Automeccanica Zebra's outside the Automeccanica factory (1981)

Automeccanica was a Greek automobile producing company. Founded in 1979, it was one of the companies that produced the "passenger-utility" type of vehicle popular in Greece at the time for tax categorization reasons. Its creators were former executives of Autokinitoviomihania Ellados (meaning 'Greek Car Industry') a company founded in 1975 to also produce vehicles of this type – it assembled Italian Fissore models based on Fiat products, as well as other Fiat models and variants. Automeccanica followed a different path, building the Zebra model, a passenger-utility car based on the Daihatsu Charade, as well as assembling the Charade itself. In 1985, when the law favoring the Zebra-type vehicles changed, Automeccanica stopped its production (after about 2,000 units had been built) and started licence production of the Soviet Lada Niva model, while it developed its own cabrio-version of the car. In 1988 it acquired its former "father" company, Autokinitoviomihania Ellados and the latter's factory in Thiva. Automeccanica went out of the car-construction business in 1995.
