= Autokinitoviomihania Ellados =

Sefunct Greek auto maker

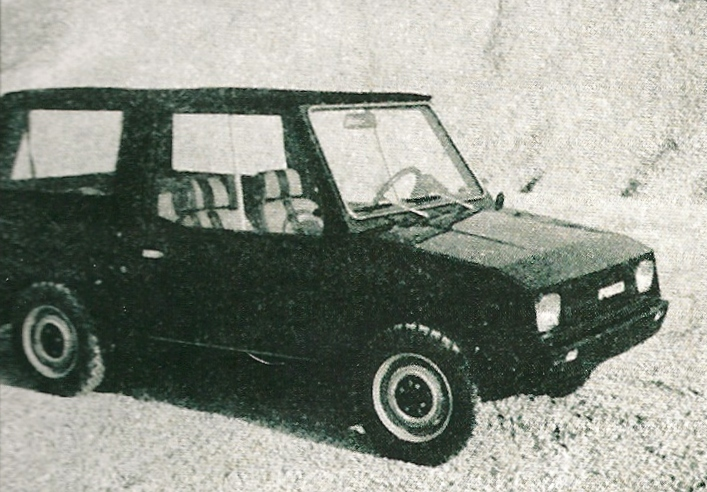
The Poker 126 (1978) was based on the Fiat 126

Autokinitoviomihania Ellados (Car Industry of Greece) was founded in Athens in 1975 by a group of Greek businessmen, including the owners of the company importing Fiat in Greece.

== History ==
The new company made a rather ambitious appearance in the Greek press, announcing the introduction and production of a Greek automobile named Mini Jeep Scout 127, a versatile passenger-utility vehicle based on the Fiat 127.

In reality, the car was not "Greek", as it was to be produced under license of the Italian Fissore company (which, in turn, had acquired the design by another Italian coachbuilder); it was not really "built", as initially most parts were imported from Italy and assembled, with little local content; the company was hardly an "industry", as it started operation in a tiny facility; and, finally, the brand name Mini Jeep appeared only on paper (and that only for a brief period, since there was a conflict with the rights to the name by the U.S. Jeep company), as the vehicle carried the Fiat logo.

Nonetheless, the introduction of the Scout 127 was quite successful. This kind of "smart" car was well fitted for the Greek market at the time. It could be used as a commercial vehicle as well as a passenger car (with certain off-road capabilities), while its design made it a fashionable "fun car". Most important, though, was a provision of Greek law that categorized such cars as "commercial vehicles" making them cheaper to own. Thus, A Ellados was the second (after Namco) in a series of Greek companies that introduced similar cars, claiming part of the market.

As demand for the car increased, A Ellados built a larger factory in Thiva in 1978, while local content progressively increased to near 50%. The Scout 127 (in the meanwhile renamed Amico 127) received some facelifts by the company, which also presented a van version. In 1978 A Ellados started production of another Italian-designed car (produced only in Greece), the Poker 126, following similar philosophy, based on the Fiat 126; this car, however, wasn't as successful, as it sold only 253 units. Moreover, it assembled a number of other types, including the Fiat 238 and Fiat 900T vans.

However, by 1984 the market for the passenger/utility cars had dramatically dropped, after a change in the Greek law (as it had been interpreted in ways that allowed luxury SUV’s to be classified as "trucks"). This evolution was a disaster for most Greek companies producing such vehicles, including A Ellados. The company ceased operations, after 6,620 vehicles had been produced, the vast majority (6,021) being Scout/Amico 127’s. Its facilities were acquired in 1988 by Automeccanica, a company founded in 1979 by former A Ellados executives.
