= Aymesa =

- Type: Private
- Industry: Automotive
- Founded: 1970
- Headquarters: Quito, Ecuador
- Key people: Unknown.
- Products: Automobiles
- Website: www.aymesa.com.ec

Automóviles y Máquinas del Ecuador S.A., known by the syllabic abbreviation AYMESA, is an automotive assembler based in Quito, Ecuador, which since 1970 is dedicated to the assembly, assembly and construction of automobiles, being a pioneer in the Ecuadorian market. When car manufacturing in Ecuador had its origins in the late sixties and early seventies, a time when the foundations of the Ecuadorian automotive industry were laid, the AYMESA plant produced one of the first locally designed vehicles the Andino, exporting 1000 units and making history within the incipient Ecuadorian industry.

== History ==
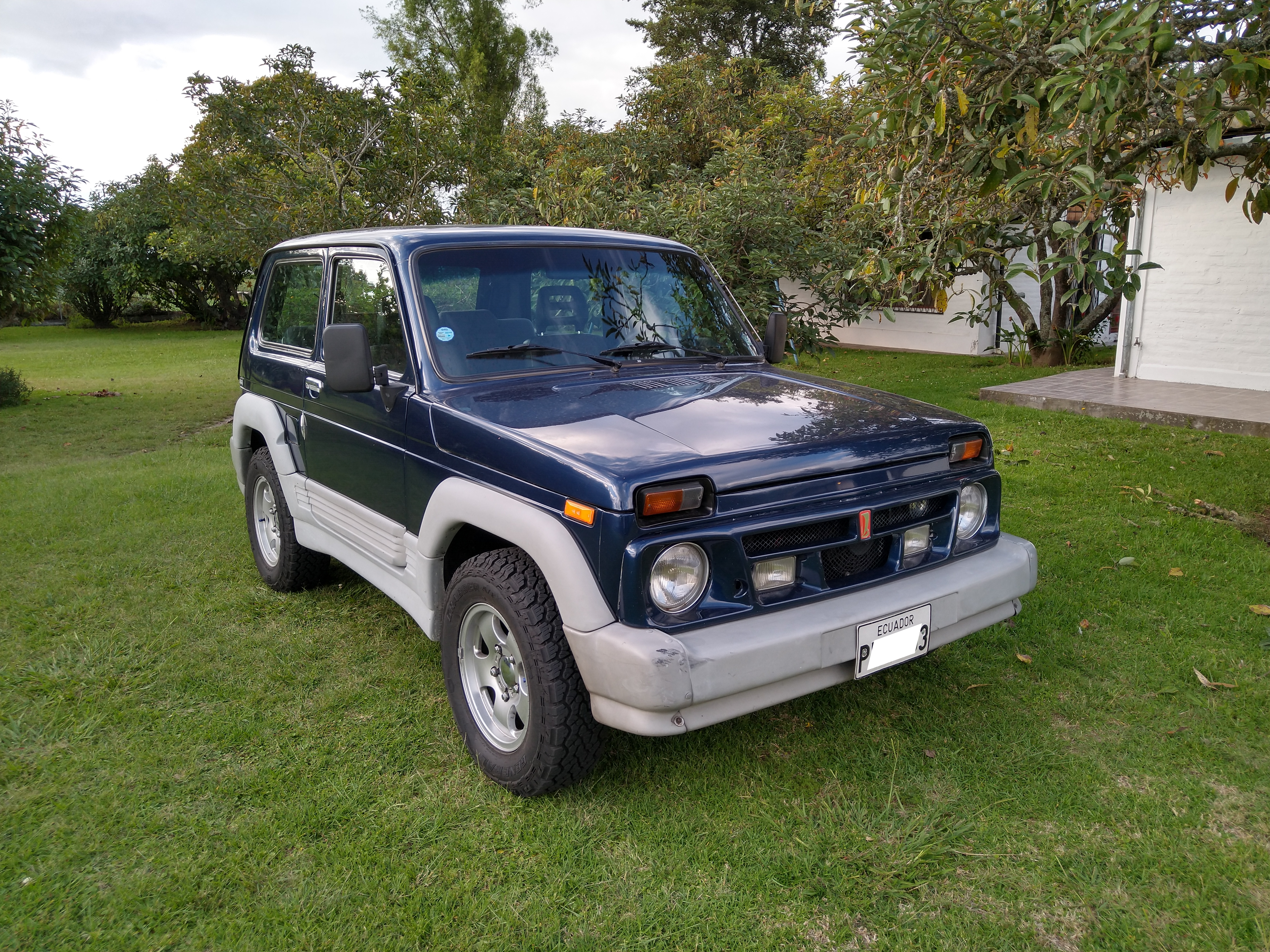
Lada Niva 2001 assembled in Ecuador.

Aymesa was founded in Quito in 1970. In cooperation with General Motors, the production of automobiles and commercial vehicles began in 1973. Until 1984, passenger cars were marketed under their own brand name Aymesa. Other sources cite the period 1972 to the 1980s or from 1980 to 1989 for this brand name. The brand name became Chevrolet in 1984. Deviating from this, a model was marketed in Venezuela as Sanremo in the 1970s.

Since 1999, there has also been an agreement with Kia Motors for vehicle production. In addition, Lada vehicles were assembled from 2000 to 2004.

== Models ==
The Andino was a pickup truck based on a Bedford model. The four-cylinder engine with OHV valve control had a displacement of 1300 cm^{3}. One source gives the construction period from 1973 to 1977, another from 1972 to 1970s.

The Condór was a coupe that largely corresponded to the Opel Kadett C. The body was made of fiberglass.

The gala was also a coupe. It had elongated rear side windows.

Various models from Opel and Suzuki followed from 1981. Specifically named are Suzuki Vitara from 1990, Suzuki Forsa from 1991 to 2004, Suzuki Esteem from 1996 to 2002, Isuzu Rodeo from 1996 to 2004, Opel Corsa from 2002 to 2012 and Chevrolet Spark from May 2003.
