= Lada Niva Vision =

Lada Niva / Lada Grand Niva

Overview
- Manufacturer: AvtoVAZ
- Model code: P13X
- Also called: Renault Niva (South America)
- Production: 2024 (planned)
- Assembly: Russia

Body and chassis
- Class: Subcompact car (B)
- Body style: 5-door SUV
- Layout: Front-engine, all-wheel-drive
- Platform: Renault–Nissan CMF-B LS
- Related: Dacia Duster III; Dacia Bigster

Dimensions
- Length: ~4,500 mm (177.2 in) (Grand Niva)

Chronology
- Predecessor: Lada Niva Legend; Lada Niva Travel

The Lada Niva Vision was a car planned to be the second generation of the Niva model. Its launch was scheduled for 2024, set to be built on the CMF-B platform.

== Overview ==
In January 2021, AvtoVAZ published the first sketch of the future Niva.

The project was canceled in 2022 due to the Russian invasion of Ukraine and, as a result, the complete withdrawal of Renault from the Russian market.

== See also ==
- Lada Iskra, also on the CMF-B platform
