= Togliatti =

Togliatti (Italian: [toʎˈʎatti]) or Tolyatti (Тольятти, Russian: [tɐlʲˈjætʲ(ː)ɪ]) may refer to:

== People ==
- Eugenio Giuseppe Togliatti (1890–1977), Italian mathematician
- Jennifer P. Togliatti (born 1967), US judge from Nevada
- Palmiro Togliatti (1893–1964), leader of the Italian Communist Party

== Places ==
- Tolyatti, a city in Samara Oblast, Russia, named after Palmiro Togliatti
  - Tolyatti City Duma, the city council of Tolyatti
  - Tolyatti constituency, a Russian legislative constituency in Samara Oblast
  - Tolyatti Pine Forest, a forest in Tolyatti

== Sports ==
- FC Tolyatti, a Russian football club based in Tolyatti
- FC Akademiya Tolyatti, a Russian football club based in Tolyatti
- FC Akron Tolyatti, a Russian football club based in Tolyatti
- FC Akron-2 Tolyatti, a Russian football club based in Tolyatti
- Lada Togliatti (disambiguation), multiple clubs

== Other uses ==
- Togliatti amnesty, drafted by Palmiro Togliatti in 1946
- Togliatti surface, an algebraic surface discovered by Eugenio Giuseppe Togliatti
- TogliattiAzot, a Russian chemical company based in Tolyatti
- Lada West Togliatti, a Russian car manufacturer based in Tolyatti
- Togliatti State University, a Russian public research university in Tolyatti
