= GM-AvtoVAZ =

Russian car company, a joint-venture between General Motors and AvtoVAZ

CJSC GM-AvtoVAZ

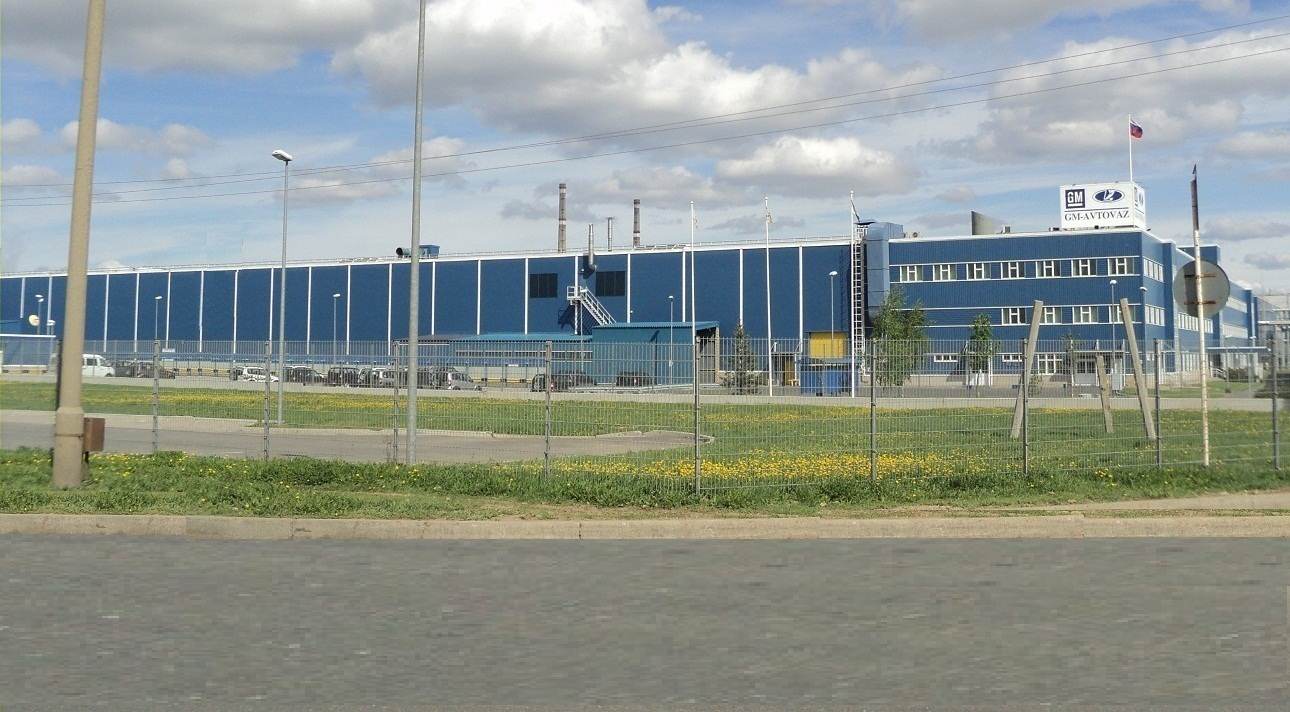
- Native name: ЗАО ГМ-АвтоВАЗ
- Company type: Joint venture
- Industry: Automotive
- Founded: 2 August 2001; 24 years ago
- Defunct: December 2019
- Fate: Bought out by AvtoVAZ
- Successor: Lada West Togliatti (AvtoVAZ's Niva products)
- Headquarters: Tolyatti, Samara Oblast, Russia
- Area served: Commonwealth of Independent States
- Products: Chevrolet Niva
- Production output: 32,909 vehicles (2017)
- Owners: AvtoVAZ (50%); General Motors (50%)
- Number of employees: 1,600 (2015)

GM-AvtoVAZ was a Russian joint venture between General Motors and AvtoVAZ set up in 2001. In 2002, it started producing the Chevrolet Niva, based on the Lada Niva, at its Tolyatti plant. Though both companies had an equal share of ownership, the venture was managed exclusively by General Motors. The venture ended in December 2019, after it was wholly acquired by AvtoVAZ.

== History ==
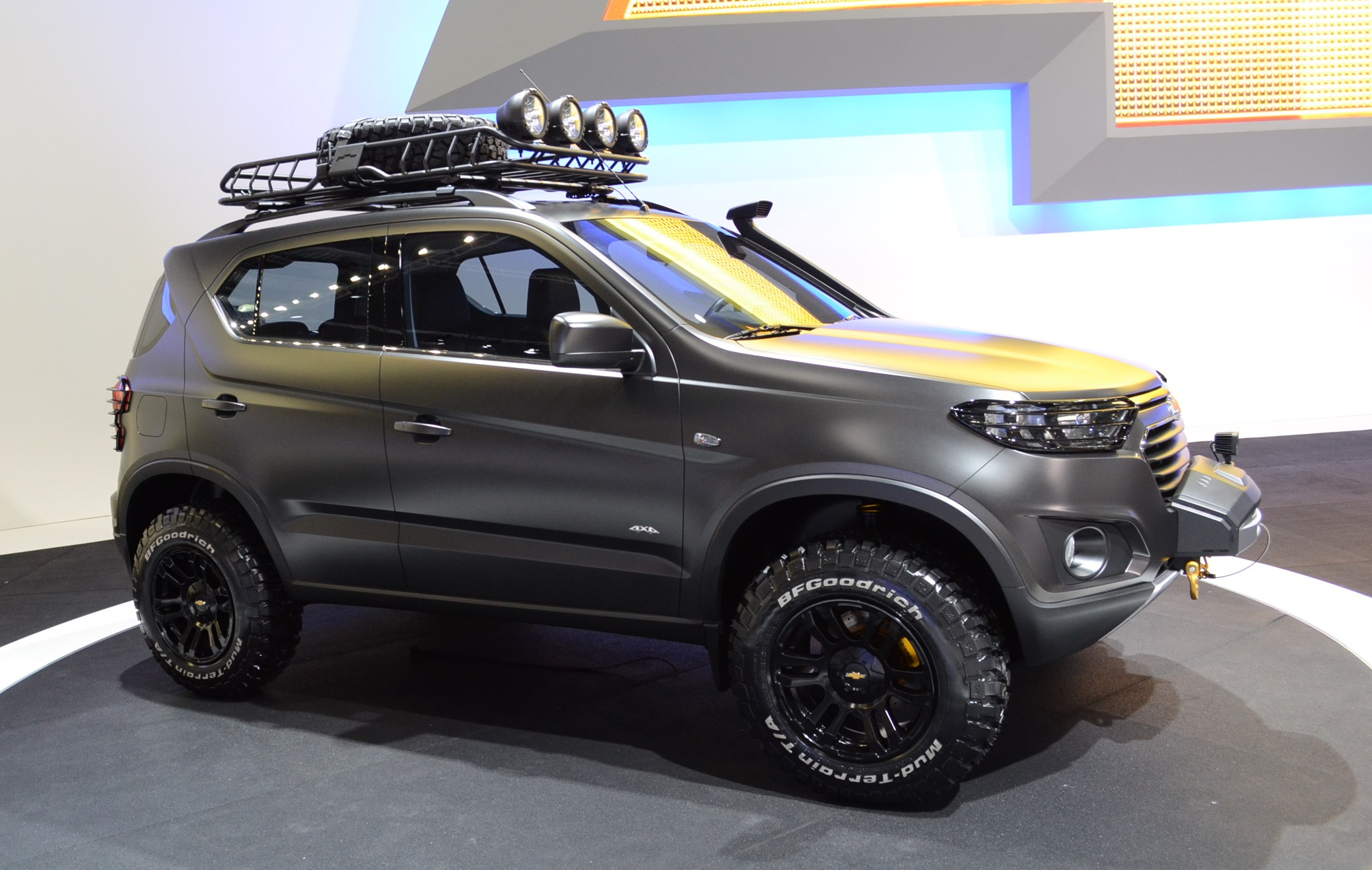
Chevrolet Niva

In 2004 the joint venture briefly produced the Chevrolet Viva, based on the 1998 Opel Astra saloon, but after low sales of only 5,000 the model was dropped.

The joint venture reached difficulties and production stoppages for a fortnight in February 2006 when AvtoVAZ was taken over by Rosoboronexport, the Russian state-owned arms-export agency, and a disagreement between the new owners and GM lead to stoppages of the supply of engines and other components.

In September 2012, the joint venture announced plans to expand by 2015, hiring an additional 1,400 employees and increasing its annual production capacity from 100,000 to 120,000 vehicles.

== Ownership ==
Voice of America report, showing operations inside the plant and an interview with a representative from GM Russia.

The joint venture was created with investment from General Motors ($99.1m, 41.61%), AvtoVAZ ($99.1m, 41.61%) and the European Bank for Reconstruction and Development ($40m, 16.78%, plus a loan facility for $100 million). In September 2012 GM and Avtovaz purchased EBRD's share, turning the joint venture into a 50/50 relationship.

In December 2019, AvtoVAZ acquired General Motors' stake in the venture, ending it. The Chevrolet branding would still be used by AvtoVAZ on the Niva models until August 2020, before replacing it by Lada.

== Products ==
As of December 2014, the joint venture produced 571,852 vehicles since production at Tolyatti commenced in 2002.

- Chevrolet Niva (1998—2019)
- Chevrolet Viva (2004—2005)
