= Lada Togliatti =

Lada Togliatti may refer to one of the following sports clubs in Togliatti, Russia:

- FC Lada Togliatti, a football club
- FC Lada Togliatti (women), FC Lada's women team
- HC Lada Togliatti, an ice hockey club
- Mega-Lada Togliatti, a motorcycle speedway team
- WHC Lada Togliatti, a women's handball club

== See also ==
- Lada West Togliatti
