= Lada Iskra =

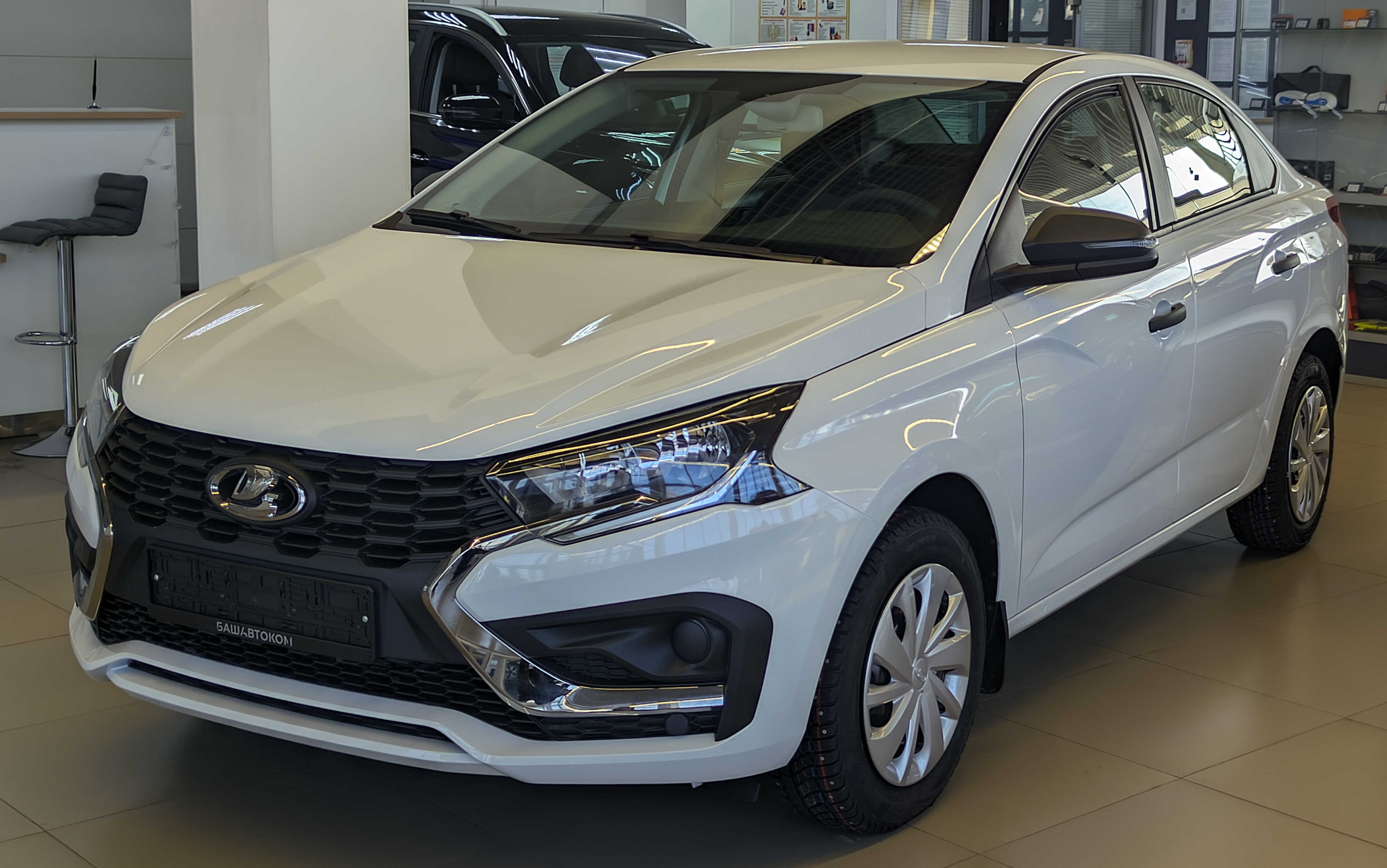
- Lada Iskra saloon

Overview
- Manufacturer: Lada (AvtoVAZ)
- Production: 2025–present
- Assembly: Russia: Tolyatti

Body and chassis
- Class: Subcompact Car (B)
- Body style: 4-door saloon; 5-door estate
- Layout: Front-engine, front-wheel-drive
- Platform: Renault–Nissan CMF-B LS platform
- Related: Dacia Logan III; Renault Taliant

Powertrain
- Engine: Petrol: 1.6 L VAZ-11182 / VAZ-21127
- Transmission: 5 / 6-speed manual; CVT

Dimensions
- Length: 4,333 mm (170.6 in)
- Width: 1,777 mm (70.0 in)
- Height: 1,517 mm (59.7 in)

Chronology
- Predecessor: Lada Granta

The Lada Iskra is a subcompact car developed by Russian automaker AvtoVAZ. It is the first new model developed by AvtoVAZ after they were reacquired by the Russian government from Renault. The range will also include a station wagon and a crossover.

The Iskra is based on a localized version of Renault's CMF-B architecture. According to AvtoVAZ, the localisation is 90%.

== Gallery ==
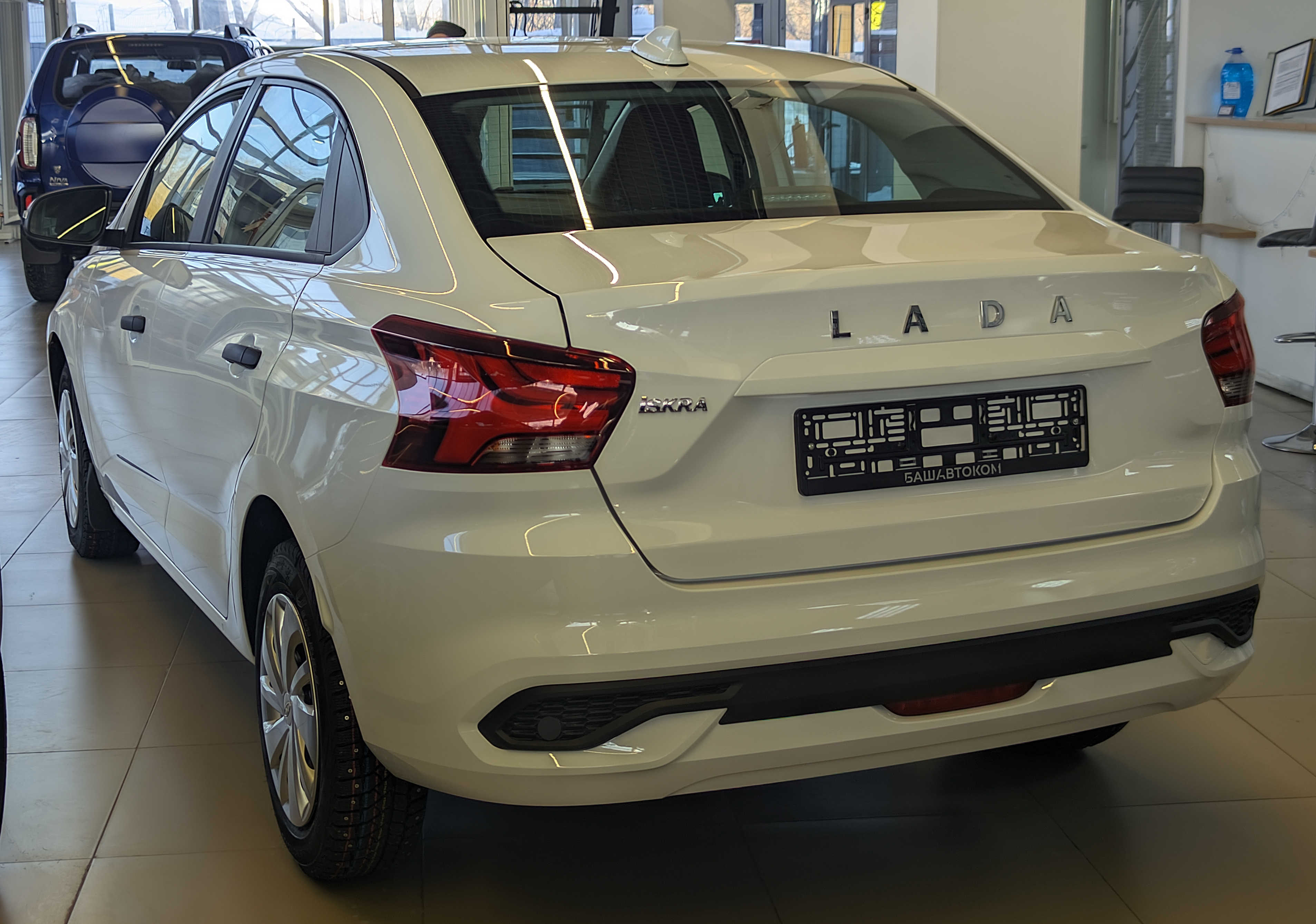
Lada Iskra saloon (rear view)

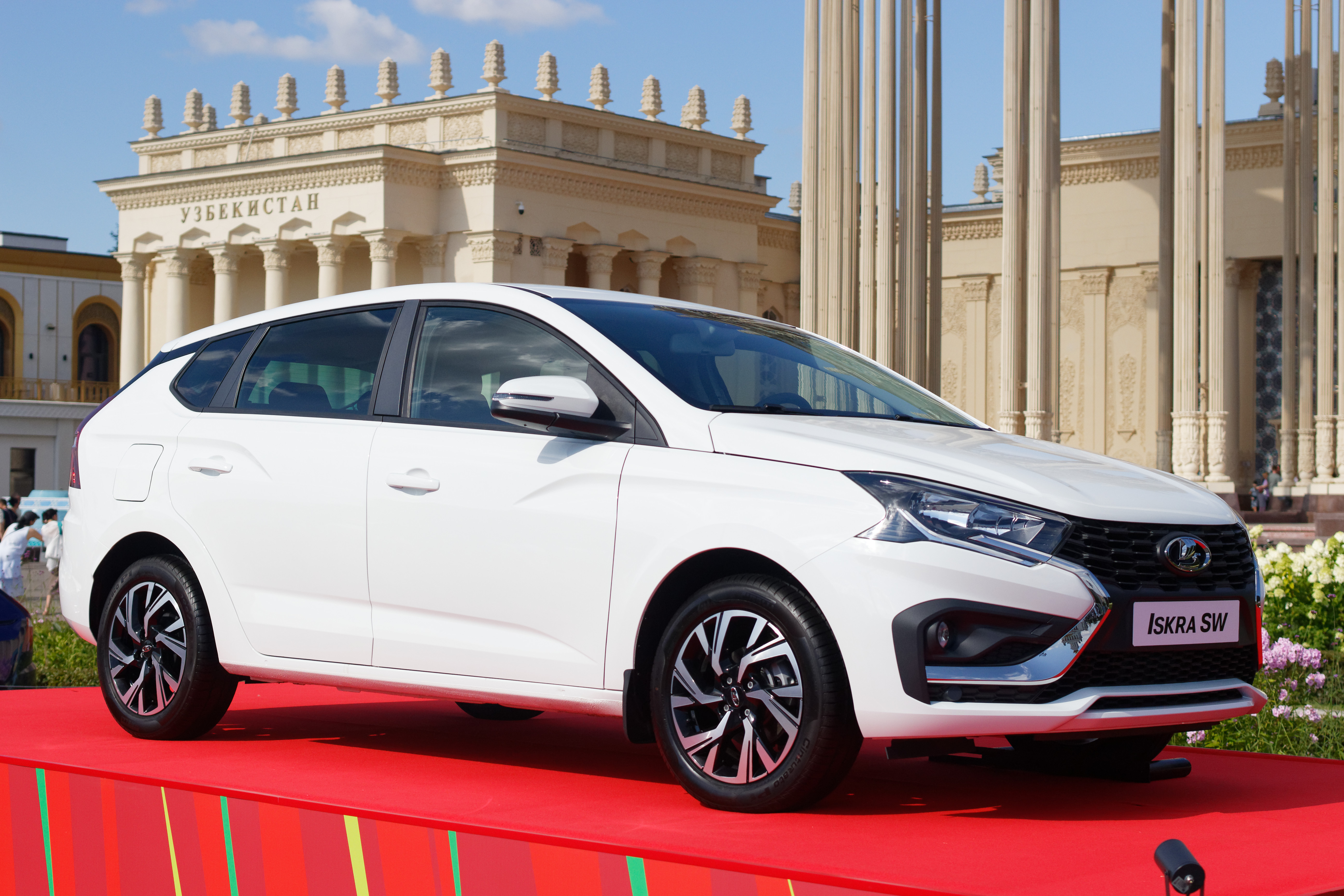
Lada Iskra SW (front view)

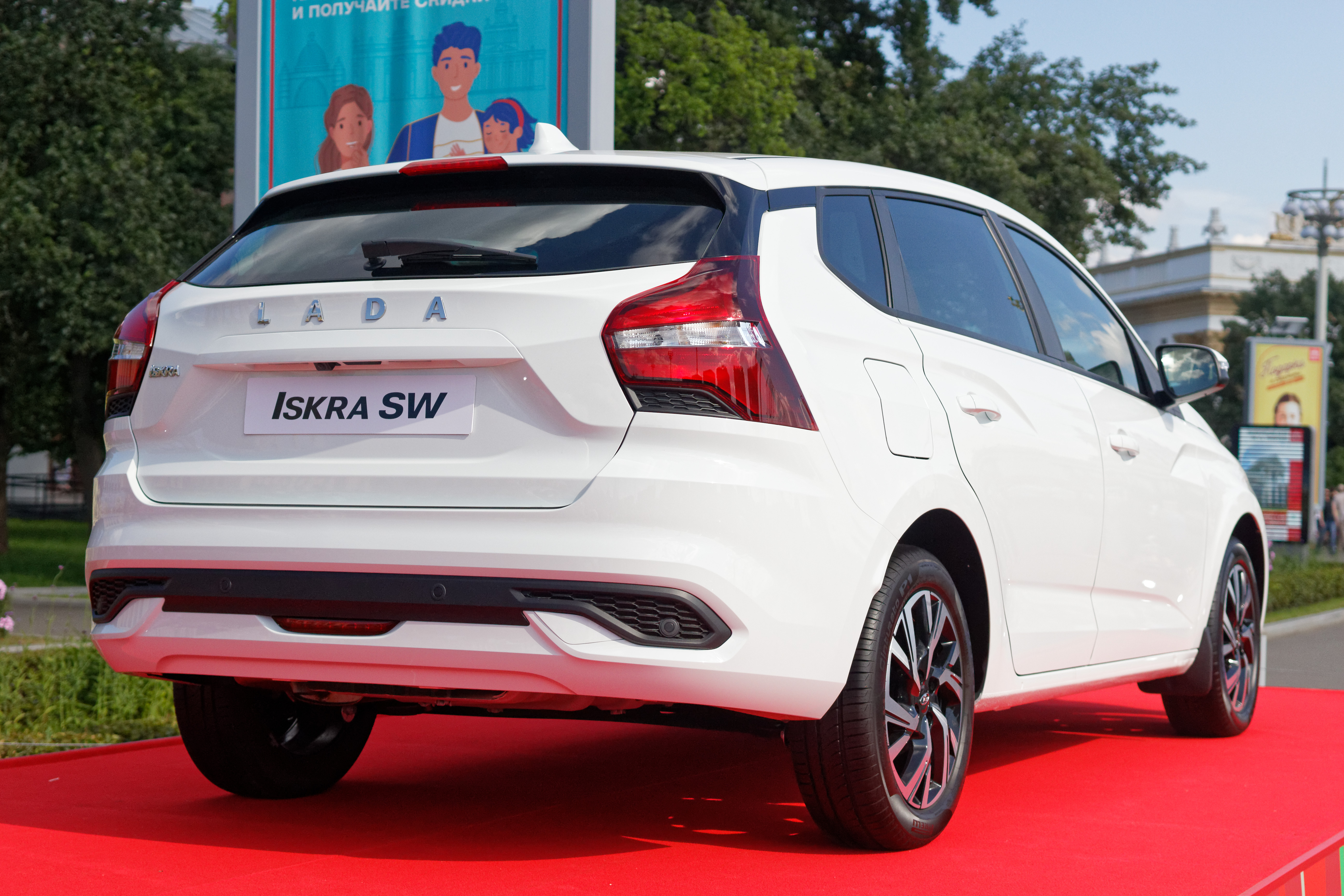
Lada Iskra SW (rear)

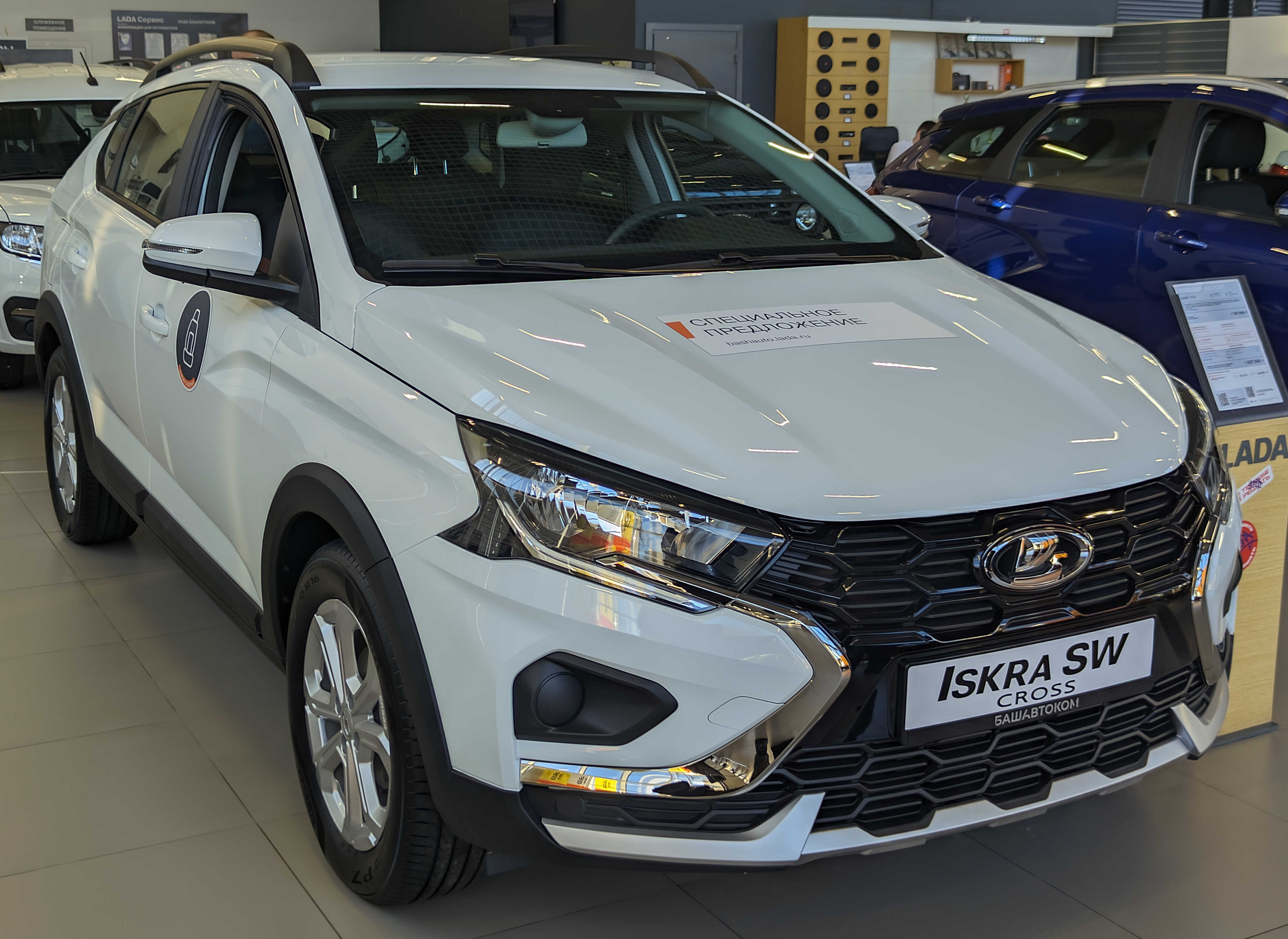
Lada Iskra SW Cross (front view)

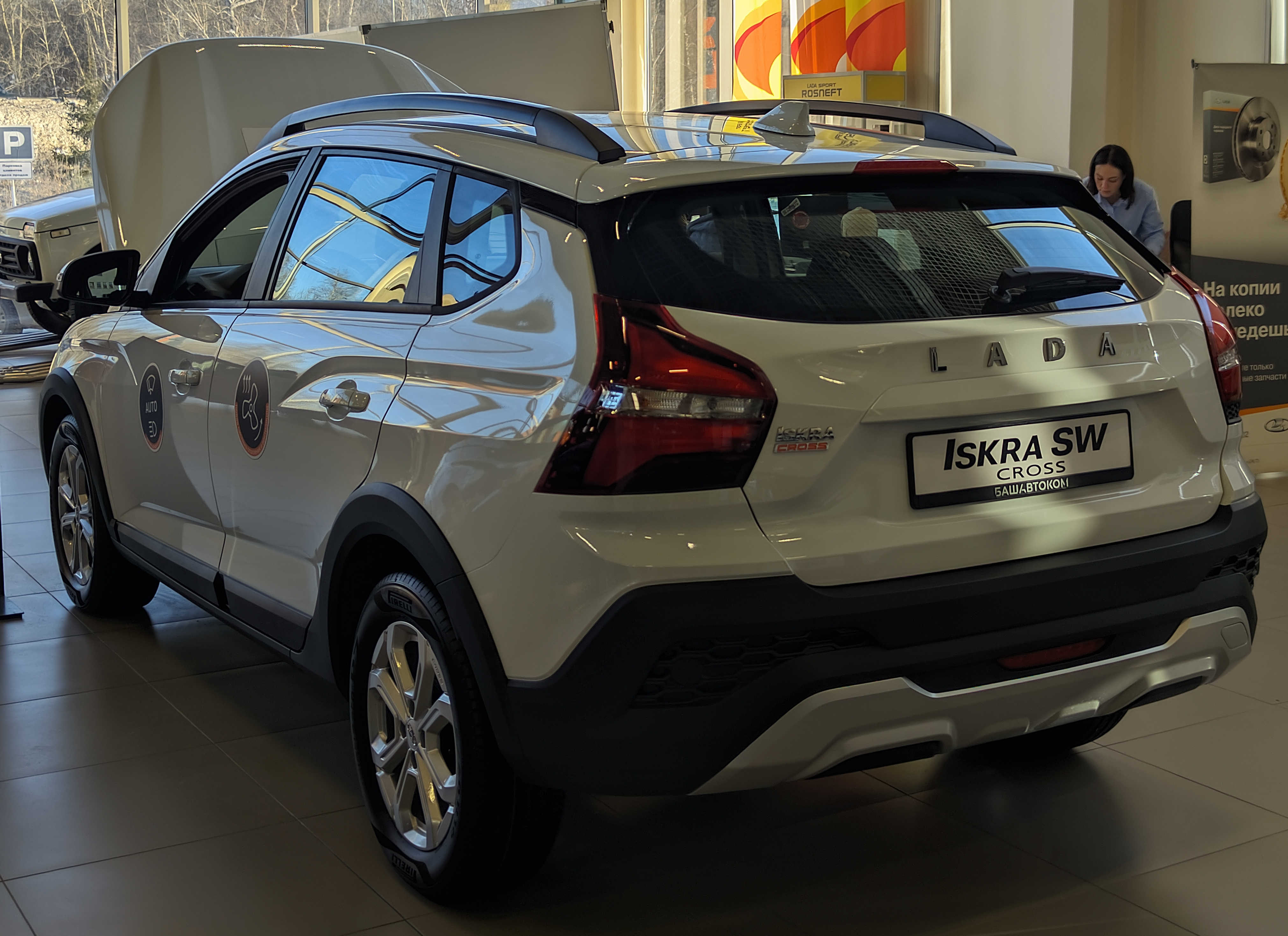
Lada Iskra SW Cross (rear)

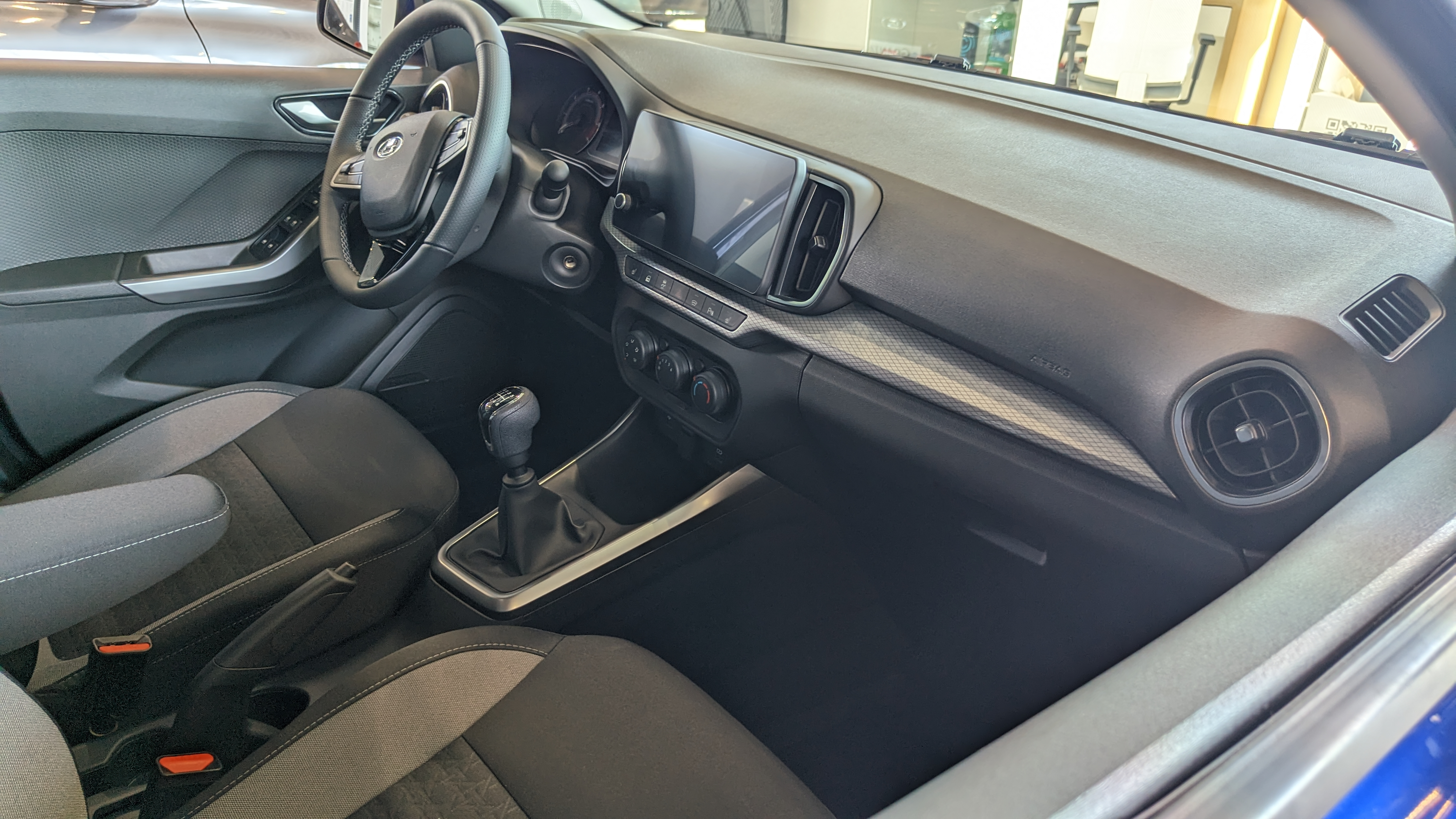
Interior
