= AvtoVAZ =

Russian automobile manufacturing company

JSC АvtoVAZ

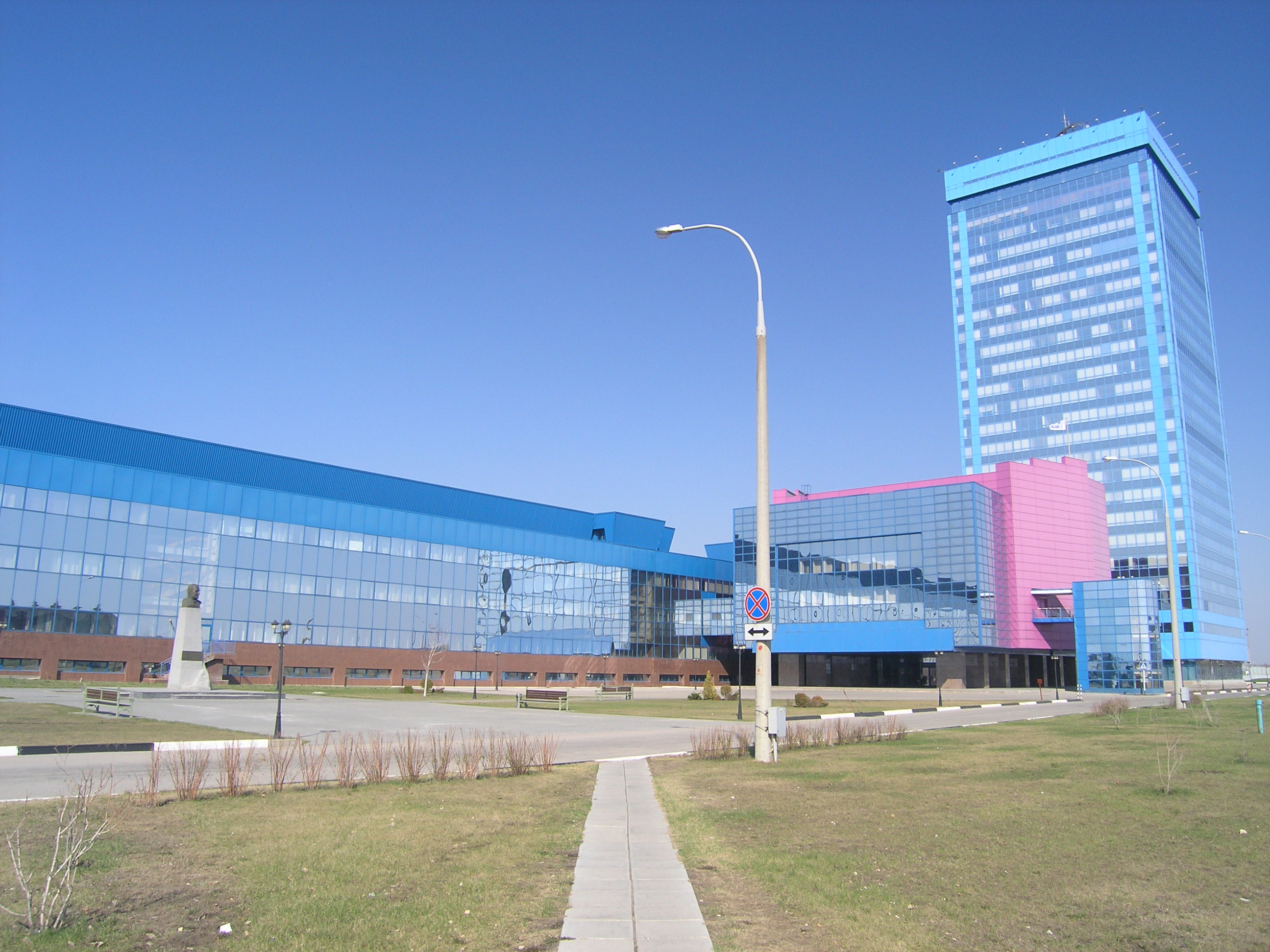
- AvtoVAZ administration building in 2010
- Native name: АО АвтоВАЗ
- Formerly: Volga Automotive Plant (VAZ); Volga group for the production of passenger cars, AvtoVAZ; PJSC AvtoVAZ
- Type: State-owned enterprise
- Industry: Automotive
- Founded: 1966; 60 years ago
- Headquarters: Tolyatti, Samara Oblast, Russia
- Area served: Worldwide
- Key people: Maksim Sokolov (Chairman and CEO)
- Products: Automobiles
- Production output: 426,419 vehicles (2020) (Note: Fully assembled vehicles badged as Lada, Renault and Datsun produced at Izhevsk and Tolyatti, without counting production of international partners.)
- Brands: Lada
- Revenue: ▼ ₽169,574.040 million (2022)
- Operating income: ▼ ₽-1,542.48 million (2022)
- Net income: ▼ ₽206.61 million (2022)
- Total assets: ▼ ₽211,019.42 million (2022)
- Total equity: ▲ ₽29,277.28 million (2022)
- Owner: Lada Auto Holding
- Number of employees: 36,413 (2018)
- Website: info.avtovaz.ru

JSC AvtoVAZ (Russian: АО АвтоВАЗ, pronounced [ɐftɐˈvas]) is a Russian state-owned automobile manufacturing company. It was formerly named as VAZ (ВАЗ), an acronym for Volga Automotive Plant (Russian: Во́лжский автомоби́льный заво́д, romanized: Volzhskiy avtomobil'nyy zavod). AvtoVAZ is best known for its flagship series of Lada vehicles. In the Soviet Union, its products used various names, including Zhiguli, Oka, and Sputnik, which were phased out in the 1990s and replaced by Lada for the Russian market. From December 2019 to August 2020, AvtoVAZ sold Niva cars with Chevrolet branding.

AvtoVAZ was established in 1966 by the Soviet government as a state-run car manufacturer. It was privatized in the 1990s and was a subsidiary of Renault from October 2016 to May 2022. In May 2022, it was re-acquired by the Russian government. The company is indirectly owned by Russian state enterprises through Lada Auto Holding.

== History ==
=== Establishment ===
The VAZ plant was established in 1966 by the Soviet government in cooperation with the Italian car manufacturer Fiat. Viktor Nikolaevich Polyakov (later Minister of Automobile Industry) was named as director, and Vladimir Solovyov as chief designer. The plant intended to produce popular economy cars that would meet the growing demand for personal transport. It was built on the banks of the Volga in 1966. A new town, Tolyatti, named after Italian Communist Party leader Palmiro Togliatti, was built around the plant. The cost of the VAZ plant was estimated at $800 million in 1970 (equivalent to $5.1 billion in 2025).

The cars to be produced (designated as "Zhiguli") were envisaged as a "people's car" like the Citroën 2CV or the VW Type 1. Production was intended to be 220,000 units a year, beginning in 1971 (other sources listed 300,000 in 1971); car production actually began before the plant was finished in 1970. The VAZ trademark, at first, was a silver Volga boat on a red pentagonal background, with "Togliatti" superimposed in Cyrillic (Тольятти); the first badges, manufactured in Turin, mistakenly had the Cyrillic "Я" rendered "R", instead (Тольʀтти), making them collector's items.

The company was not as vertically integrated as other Soviet enterprises; for example, it purchased components from a variety of suppliers over which it exerted little control; in the early years of the company certain parts and subassemblies were imported from Fiat's suppliers in Italy until they could be locally sourced.

=== 1970s ===
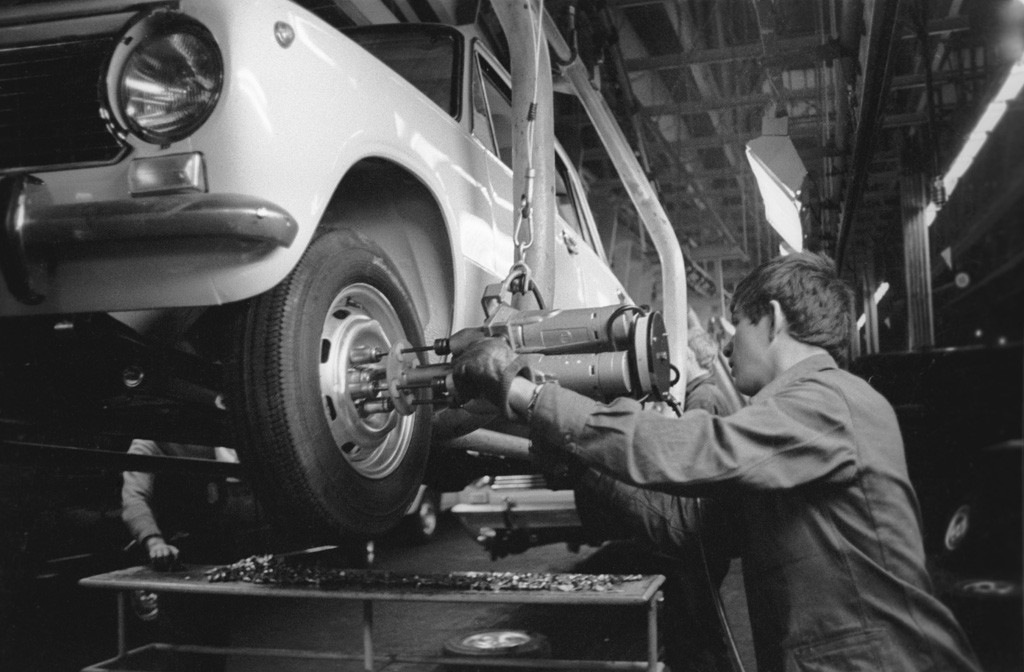
The VAZ automaking plant in 1969

The first car, the VAZ-2101 (a slightly modified and rebadged Fiat 124), was produced on 22 April 1970, the 100th anniversary of Lenin's birth. About 22,000 VAZ-2101s were built in 1970, with capacity at the end of 1973 reaching 660,000 a year; 21 December, the one-millionth 2101 was built. A third production line was added in October 1974, boosting output to 2,230 cars a day. The same year, total VAZ production reached 1.5 million.

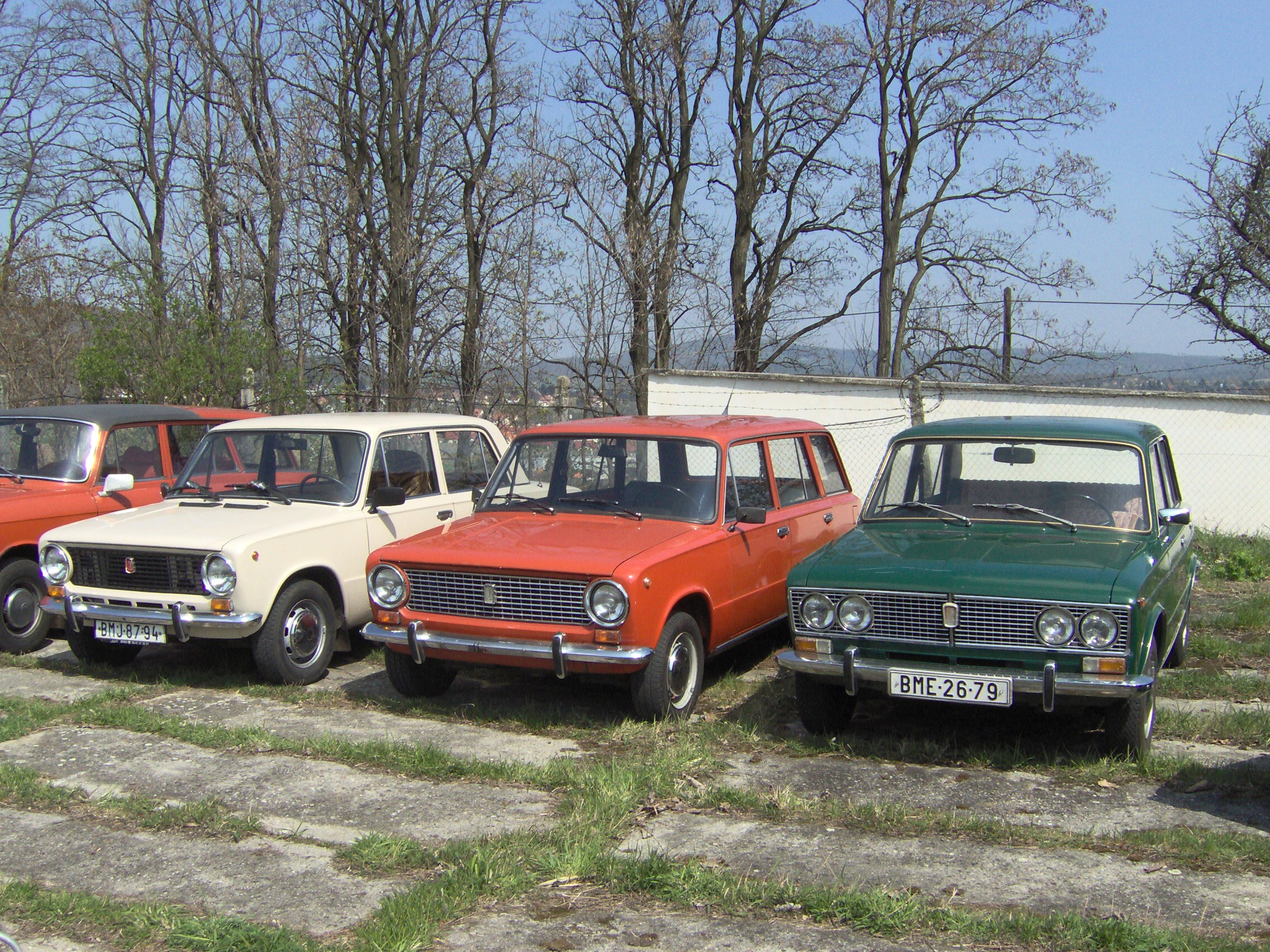
Early VAZ models (left to right): VAZ-2101 (1970), VAZ-2102 (1971) and VAZ-2103 (1972)

The VAZ plant trialled many of the new automation systems that Fiat was planning to introduce in its own factories, and was described as "ultra-modern" by the Chicago Tribune in a 1973 article. Production reached 750,000 cars a year in 1975, making the Tolyatti plant the third-most productive in the world. Between 1977 and 1981, AvtoVAZ acquired 30 welding robots from Japanese firms.

In 1974, VAZ was given permission to begin producing Wankel engines under licence from NSU. Work began in 1976, with a single-rotor Lada appearing in 1978; the first 250 of these went on sale in the summer of 1980.

Having already built various prototypes and experimental vehicles, AvtoVAZ launched the first car which was entirely designed by the company, the VAZ-2121 Niva, in 1977. This popular and innovative sport utility vehicle (SUV) was designed for offroad use, featuring a gearbox with a central differential lock lever, as well as a low- and high-range selector lever.

The VAZ-2105, based on the Fiat 124 mechanicals, but modernised and restyled, was introduced in 1979 and marketed outside the Soviet Union under the Riva or Laika trade names, depending on the country. Square headlights and new body panels distinguish this car from the earlier models. The 2105 was third-best selling automobile platform after the Volkswagen Beetle and the Ford Model T, and one of the longest production run platforms alongside the Volkswagen Beetle, the Hindustan Ambassador, and the Volkswagen Type 2.

In 1993, TTS, signed a contract with AvtoVAZ. In 1995, the first full—fledged LADA car center was opened in the city of Naberezhnye Chelny and started direct deliveries from the automobile plant. In 1995, an office was opened in Kazan. Until 1997, cars were driven from Naberezhnye Chelny. After that, they were transported by rail.

=== 1980s ===
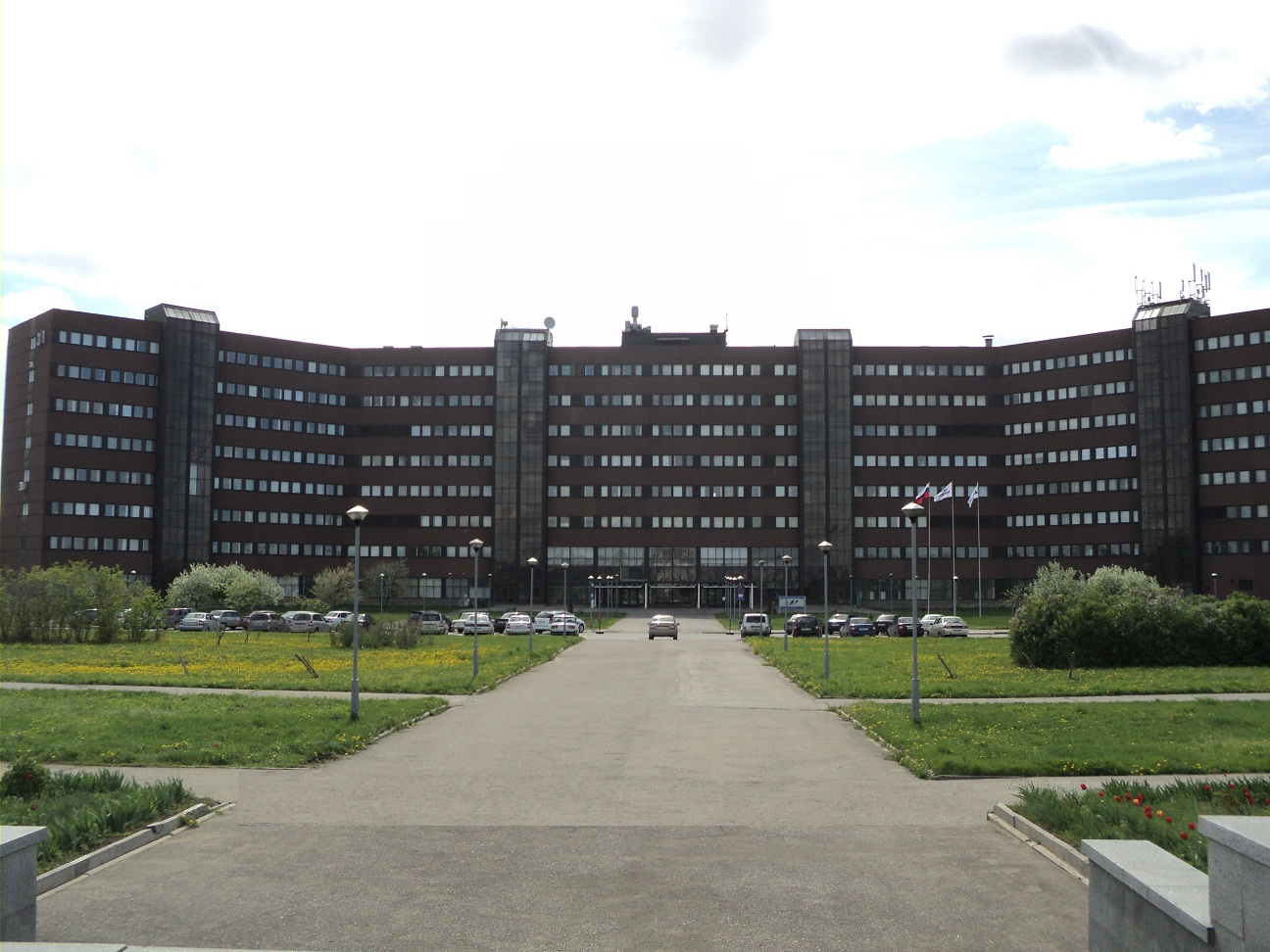
Technical and design center

In May 1980, a series of mass strikes at the Togliatti plant involving hundreds of thousands of workers was reported by the western press.

Based on the success of the Niva, the design department prepared a new family of front-wheel drive models by 1984, which was of a completely domestic design. Production started with the VAZ-2108 Sputnik three-door hatchback, the series was commercially known as Samara. It was the first front-wheel drive serial car built in the Soviet Union after the LuAZ- 969V.

A white 2108 became the nine-millionth Lada built, on 24 May 1985, with the ten-millionth, on 9 October 1986, also a 2108. The twelve-millionth, a right-hand drive 2109, was produced 6 July 1989.

By the late 1980s, AvtoVAZ was suffering from the deterioration of its capital goods, such as tools and machinery, resulting from insufficient levels of investment over a long period. Unproductive and antiquated management techniques also contributed to the decline, as did the absence of market competition. The first privately owned AvtoVAZ dealership was established by Boris Berezovsky in 1989. Dealerships quickly turned into criminal rackets that at times simply stole cars from the factory.

=== After privatization ===
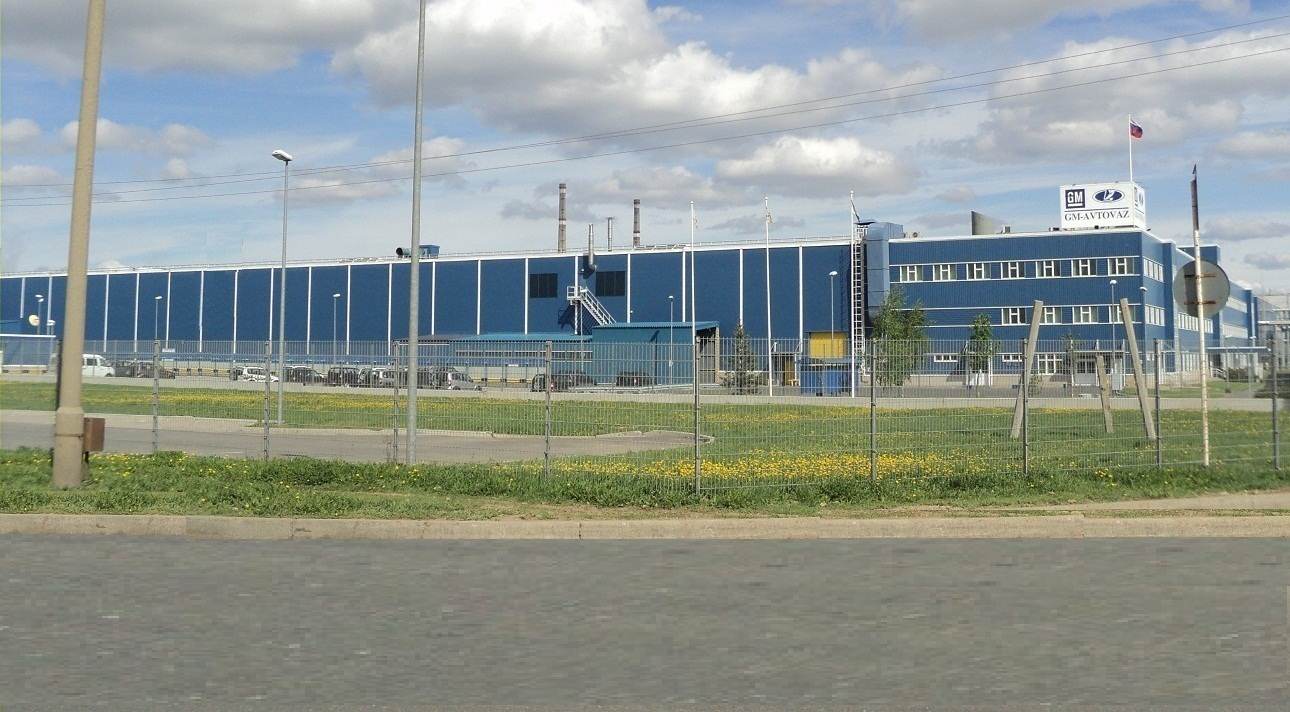
GM-AvtoVAZ plant in Tolyatti, Russia

In June 1991, Bear Stearns was hired by the Soviet government to conduct an appraisal of AvtoVAZ and negotiate a venture with a Western partner, in preparation for the privatization of the company. An independent trade union was started during the same year, as workers deemed the traditional trade union to be too close to the interests of management.

In January 1993, AvtoVAZ was re-established as a joint-stock company under Russian law. The company came to be controlled by the management, including Vladimir Kadannikov, head of AvtoVAZ. It was listed on the Moscow Exchange. As with many other privatized post-Soviet companies, the financial situation at AvtoVAZ was dire, with workers being unpaid for months at a time.

In 1994, Boris Berezovsky's dealership company, called Logovaz (Russian: ЛогоВАЗ), accounted for nearly 10% of the domestic sales of AvtoVAZ. Despite the state of the Russian economy at the time, demand for AvtoVAZ cars remained buoyant, but widespread corruption in the distribution network led the company to accumulate massive debts.

The 110-series sedan was introduced in 1995, two years after its original 1993 deadline. Development costs for the car were estimated at $2 billion. The 2111 station wagon followed in 1998 and the 2112 hatchback completed the range in 2001.

By 1995, car sales, distribution, and spare parts at AvtoVAZ were all controlled by criminal organizations. This situation was made possible by the close relationship that existed between the criminals and part of the management. Additionally, gangsters were used to control the workers and break strikes.

By late 1996, AvtoVAZ had become the country's largest tax debtor, owing $2.4 billion in unpaid taxes. In 1997, the Ministry of Internal Affairs launched Operation Cyclone, an investigation that ultimately uncovered evidence that gangsters connected to AvtoVAZ had carried out at least 65 murders of company managers, dealers, and business rivals.

The 1998 Russian financial crisis improved the company's market position, by improving the effectiveness of export sales and making imported cars too expensive for most Russians. The VAZ-2120 Nadezhda, a minivan based on the Lada Niva, was introduced in 1998. In the second half of the 1990s, some efforts were made to improve the quality of production, but in 1999, nearly 50,000 cases of cars were still being assembled with missing parts.

In 2001, GM-AvtoVAZ, a joint venture with General Motors, was established. Increased competition from foreign car manufacturers had the company's share of the Russian market fall to 49% in 2002, compared to 56% four years earlier. In 2003, VAZ presented the concept car Lada Revolution, an open single-seater sports car powered by a 1.6-L engine producing 215 hp (160 kW). Production of the Wankel engine used on some Lada models (mostly the police versions) stopped in 2004.

The introduction of the new Kalina B-segment lineup to the market occurred in 2005. AutoVAZ built a new modern plant for this model and was hoping to sell some 200,000 cars annually. The Kalina had been originally designed in the early 1990s, and its launch was repeatedly delayed, exemplifying the company's difficulty in bringing products to market in time. In October 2005, control of the company, which had until then been exercised by subsidiaries of AvtoVAZ connected to Kadannikov, was transferred to Rosoboronexport. March 2007 had the start of production of Lada Priora, a restyled and modernised 110-series model.

In 2005 it was estimated in a documentary created by Channel One Russia that about 500 people were killed between 1990 and 2005 during conflicts between police and criminals related to AvtoVAZ. The Documentary was released same year when Rosoboronexport took over AvtoVAZ with the support of 300 police officers during the extraordinary general meeting. Though Rosoboronexport was not listed as company shareholder at the time, no objections were raised by other parties, such as official shareholders. Rosoboronexport action was supported by Vladimir Putin publicly.

=== Involvement of Renault-Nissan ===
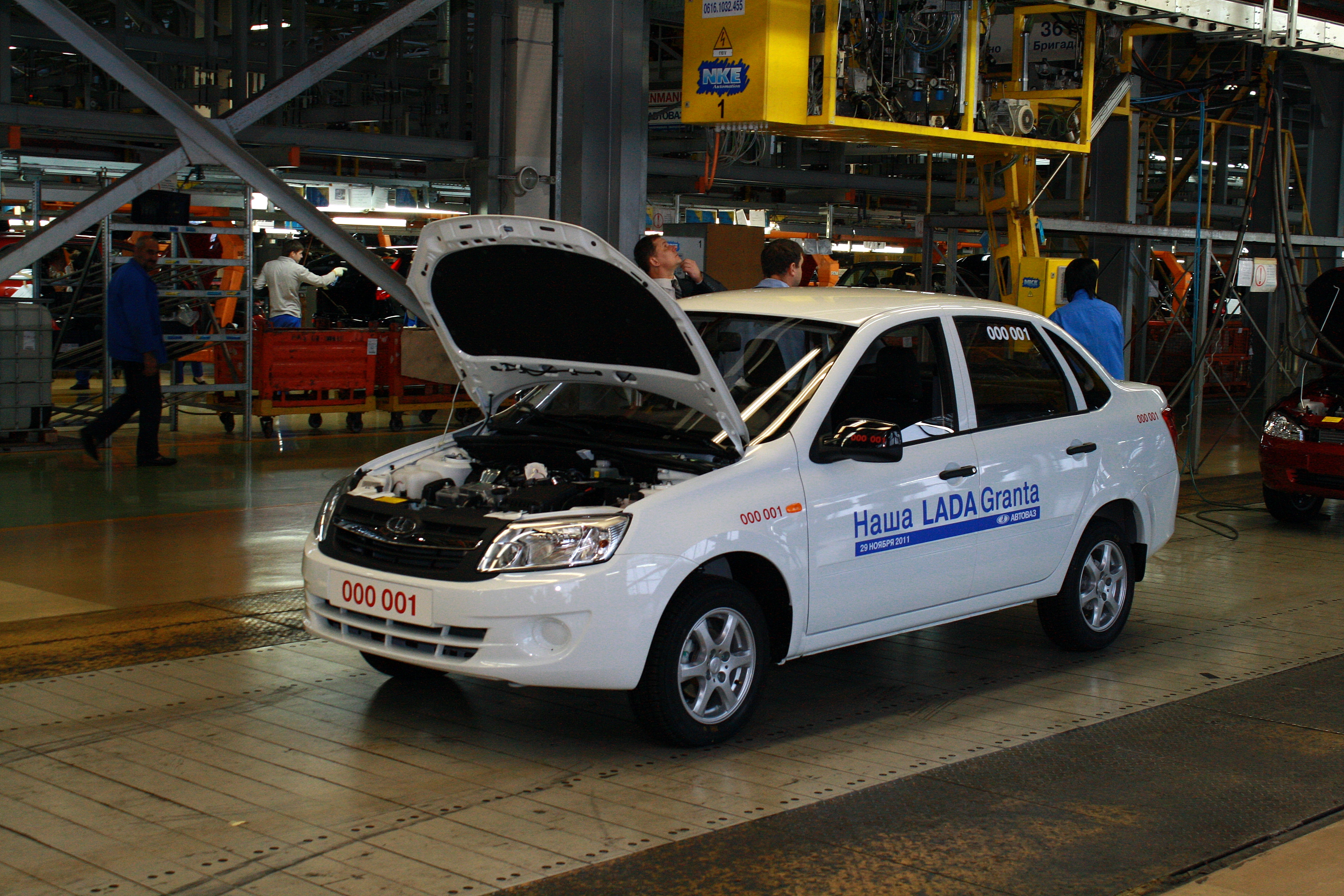
The first Lada Granta on the Tolyatti assembly line, 2011

In March 2008, Renault purchased a 25% stake in AvtoVAZ in a US$1 billion deal, with Rostec retaining most of the remaining 75%. The deal was agreed at a time when the Russian car market was booming.

The onset of the Great Recession caused considerable problems to the company. By April 2009, AvtoVAZ was on the verge of bankruptcy, which was only avoided because of a $600 million bailout from the Russian government. As an anticrisis measure, the Russian government introduced a car scrappage scheme in March 2010. Avtovaz sales doubled in the second quarter of 2010 as a result, and the company returned to profit. By the end of 2010, automotive production in Russia had returned to precrisis levels.

In 2011, production of the classic Fiat 124-based 2105 and 2107 series models was completely moved from the Togliatti plant to the IzhAvto plant near Izhevsk, to make space for the company's forthcoming 2016 model. In April 2012, AvtoVAZ confirmed the end of the model 2107 (Lada Riva or Lada Nova), after more than 40 years.

Sales of the Lada Granta, a subcompact car developed in collaboration with Renault, started in December 2011. The Lada Largus was launched in the Russian market in the middle of July 2012. In August 2012, the Lada XRAY concept car was launched at the Moscow International Automobile Salon. The XRAY was designed by chief designer Steve Mattin, formerly of Volvo and Mercedes-Benz. The second generation of the Lada Kalina, basically a facelifted first generation, was also revealed at the 2012 Moscow International Motor Show. The Kalina was also produced with a more powerful version named Lada Kalina Sport. On 3 May 2012, the Renault-Nissan alliance signed a letter of intent to raise its stake in Avtovaz to 51.01%. On 12 December 2012, the Renault–Nissan Alliance formed a joint venture with Roste (Alliance Rostec Auto BV) with the aim of becoming the long-term controlling shareholder of AvtoVAZ. In the same year, it was announced that Avtovaz and Sollers planned to jointly produce vehicles in Kazakhstan. The plant was set to open in 2016 and built in Ust-Kamenogorsk, in the eastern part of the country, to produce around 120,000 cars a year.

=== Later developments ===
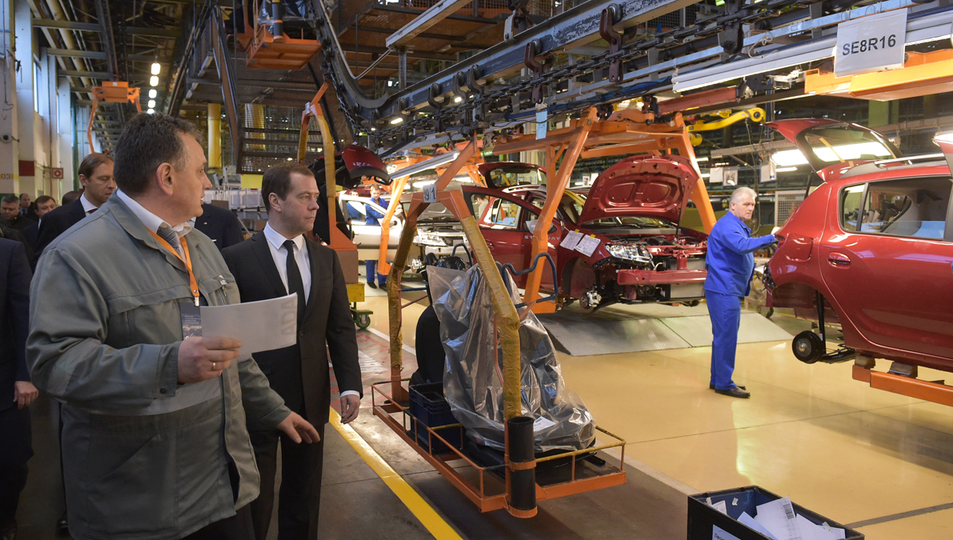
AvtoVAZ plant in January 2016

In November 2013, Bo Andersson joined AvtoVAZ as CEO, the first non-Russian to head the company. He became involved in conflicts with local suppliers, which he accused of supplying low-quality products.

The takeover of AvtoVAZ was completed in June 2014, and the two companies of the Renault-Nissan Alliance took a combined 67.1% stake of Alliance Rostec, which in turn acquired 74.5% of AvtoVAZ, thereby giving Renault and Nissan indirect control over the Russian manufacturer.

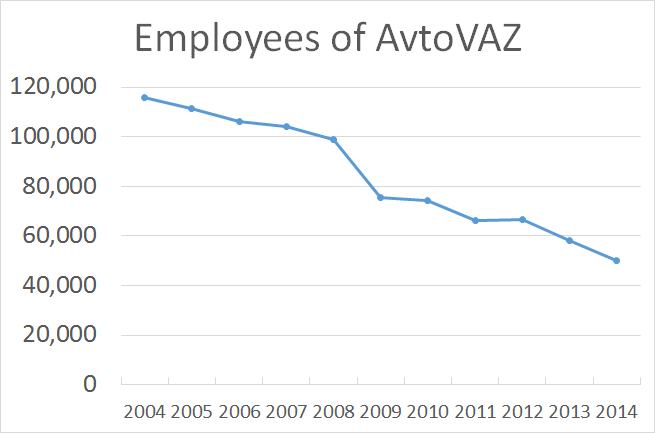
Employees of AvtoVAZ, 2004–14

In 2014, AvtoVAZ sold 448,114 vehicles, down 16.3% comparing to the previous year, due to the overall market slowdown in Russia. The total production capacity of the Togliatti factory is 910,000 vehicles. By 2014, the company's liabilities exceeded assets by 68 billion rubles, for UK-based Ernst & Young to express "significant doubt" about the company's "ability to continue as a going concern". In 2014, the Largus got a new modification, the Lada Largus Cross. In the fall of 2014 AvtoVAZ began production of a new Kalina model, the Lada Kalina Cross.

Production of the Lada Vesta, based on a new b\C platform developed by AvtoVAZ in cooperation with Renault-Nissan Alliance, started on September 25, 2015, at Lada Izhevsk manufacturing site. For the first time in Lada history, only a year had passed between concept car and start of production. Lada XRAY was the first compact city crossover in company's history. Starts of sales was held on February 14, 2016.

Total Lada sales in 2015 amounted to 269,096 cars, of which 207,389 were built by AvtoVAZ in Tolyatti, while the rest were made by Lada Izhevsk, giving the company a 17.9% share of the Russian automotive market.

In March 2016, Nicolas Maure became the company's CEO. In April 2016, Carlos Ghosn, Renault-Nissan Chairman, ceded his AvtoVAZ chairmanship position to Sergey Skvortsov, Deputy General Director of Rostec, the minority shareholder in Avtovaz. Despite massive layoffs since 2008, in 2016, the company remained unprofitable.

=== Groupe Renault takeover ===
In October 2016, Renault invested $1.33 billion in another recapitalization of AvtoVAZ, this time without involvement from Nissan, making the company a subsidiary of the French group. In September 2017, Nissan sold its AvtoVAZ stake to Renault for €45 million.

In December 2018, Renault and Rostec completed the acquisition of all AvtoVAZ shares through their Alliance Rostec venture. The company then delisted from the Moscow Exchange. In 2018, AvtoVAZ posted a net profit of $90.5 million, its first positive result in a decade. In June 2019, Rostec announced it would eventually reduce its stake in AvtoVAZ to 25%. In December 2021, Renault and Rostec transferred its shares from the Netherlands-registered Alliance Rostec to the Russia-registered Lada Auto Holding. The new holding kept the same Renault-Rostec shareholding ratio as its Dutch predecessor. In March 2022, following the 2022 Russian invasion of Ukraine and international pressure to do so, Renault said it was "assessing" its AvtoVAZ ownership.

In December 2019, AvtoVAZ acquired General Motors' stake in their GM-AvtoVAZ joint venture. As part of the deal, AvtoVAZ used Chevrolet branding for the Niva models until August 2020, before replacing it with Lada.

In January 2021, following a company revamp, Renault said it would integrate Lada and sister Dacia brands into a new business unit. AvtoVAZ was made part of the business unit structure. In 2021, the company's revenue amounted to 301 billion rubles.

=== Effects stemming from the 2022 Russian invasion of Ukraine ===
On 3 March 2022 AvtoVAZ announced the suspension of the assembly of cars in Tolyatti and Izhevsk from 5 March. The company issued a press release blaming 'the ongoing crisis in the supply of electronic components.'

=== Re-nationalization ===
On 16 May 2022, Renault said it had sold its controlling stake in AvtoVAZ to the Central Research and Development Automobile and Engine Institute (NAMI), a state-owned research center, for one rouble. The agreement has a buyback option for Renault within six years after the sale.

In November 2022, the controlling shareholder of AvtoVAZ, NAMI, acquired Nissan's Saint Petersburg facilities (including its assembly plant) for a "symbolic price" with a six-year buyback option. In February 2023, NAMI sold 99% of them in turn to AvtoVAZ for €1. AvtoVAZ plans to use the plant to assemble C and D-segment vehicle kits from other manufacturers, under the Lada badging.

== Company structure ==
=== Ownership ===
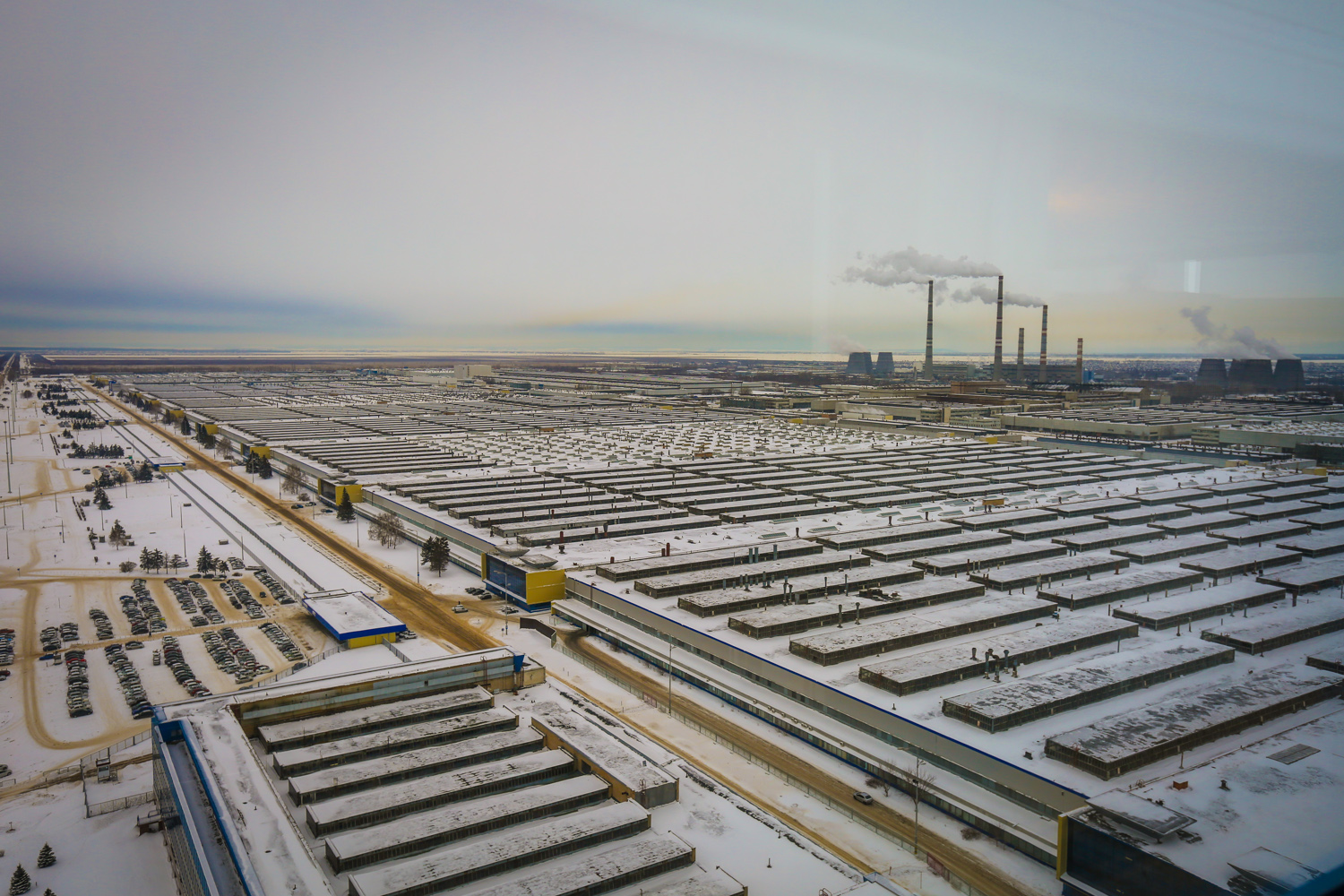
The AvtoVAZ production complex in Tolyatti – December 2014

After its re-establishment as a joint-stock company in January 1993, the ownership structure of AvtoVAZ became opaque, with two different management groups controlling the majority of the shares, one led by company chairman Kadannikov, holding 33.2% through the AVVA company, while another group held 19.2% through the AFC company. AvtoVAZ, in turn, owned over 80% of AVVA, which was said to be under the influence of Boris Berezovsky.

As of May 2022, AvtoVAZ's owner is Lada Auto Holding, which is a joint venture between two state enterprises, NAMI and Rostec.

=== Subsidiaries and affiliates ===
Various AvtoVAZ's subsidiaries and affiliates produce vehicles within Russia. The main plant is the one in Tolyatti, with three assembly lines, which assembled 312,000 cars in 2016. Lada West Togliatti is a car manufacturing plant within the Tolyatti complex, formerly owned by GM-AvtoVAZ. As of July 2021, its production has been halted. Lada Izhevsk, a company established in 1965 and that adopted its present name in 2017, has one assembly line and produced 96,000 cars in 2016. VIS-AVTO is a company established in 1991. It converts AvtoVAZ cars into commercial vehicles and produces Bronto-badged Nivas. It assembled 4,146 vehicles in 2015. Lada Sport is AvtoVAZ's motorsport and performance subsidiary which produced 3,153 cars in 2015. AvtoVAZ also controls Lada Saint Petersburg, the Saint Petersburg plant operated by Nissan until 2022.

Apart from its own facilities, AvtoVAZ has associated companies for production. CJSC Super-Avto, a company associated to AvtoVAZ and established in 1997, is focused on the modification of Lada cars. In 2015, it converted 569 of them. In June 2016, the company filed for bankruptcy, but it resumed business by late 2016. ChechenAvto, a state-owned enterprise based in Argun, produced 6,700 cars in 2016. AvtoVAZ has had overseas partners for assembly in Egypt, Kazakhstan, Uzbekistan and other countries.

As of December 2020, other relevant AvtoVAZ subsidiaries include JSC Lada-Service (a holding of the AvtoVAZ-controlled dealerships which exists in its present form since 2007), JSC Lada-Image (official spare parts distributor in Russia, established in 2003), PPPO LLC, ZAK LLC, LIN LLC, Sockultbilt-AvtoVAZ LLC, and Lada International Ltd.

AvtoVAZ financial affiliate is Auto Finance Bank. The first financial affiliate for AvtoVAZ was AvtoVAZbank, which operated as such from 1988 to 1996. In 1997, it was replaced by Lada-Credit (originally named Automotive Banking House).

== Currently produced models ==
- Lada Niva (off-road car, also known as VAZ-2121, VAZ-2131 and Lada 4x4, since 1977)
- Lada Niva Travel (off-road car, since 2020)
- Lada Granta (subcompact car, also known as VAZ-2190, VAZ-2191, VAZ-2192, and VAZ-2194 since 2011)
- Lada Largus (since 2012)
- Lada Vesta (compact car, since 2015)
- Lada Iskra (subcompact car, since 2024)
- Lada Aura

== Export ==
Exports of AvtoVAZ vehicles to the West began in 1974; Ladas were sold as in several Western nations during the 1970s and 1980s, though trade sanctions banned their export to the United States.

Economic instability in the former Soviet Union in the 1990s, combined with tightening emissions regulations and increasing stringency of safety legislation, triggered the withdrawal of AvtoVAZ from most Western markets by late 1997.

In later years, Lada again began exporting vehicles. Lada products are marketed in Russia, Azerbaijan, Armenia, Belarus, Bolivia, Bulgaria, Chile, Egypt, Georgia, Germany, Hungary, Kazakhstan, Kyrgyzstan, Latvia, Lithuania, Lebanon, Moldova, Slovakia, Tajikistan, Turkmenistan, Ukraine, Uzbekistan, Serbia, Syria, Peru, and Jordan.

In 2015, 28,461 Lada cars were exported, mostly to Kazakhstan (14,278 vehicles), Azerbaijan (4,690), Belarus (2,360), Egypt (2,128), and Germany (1,515).

== Motorsport ==
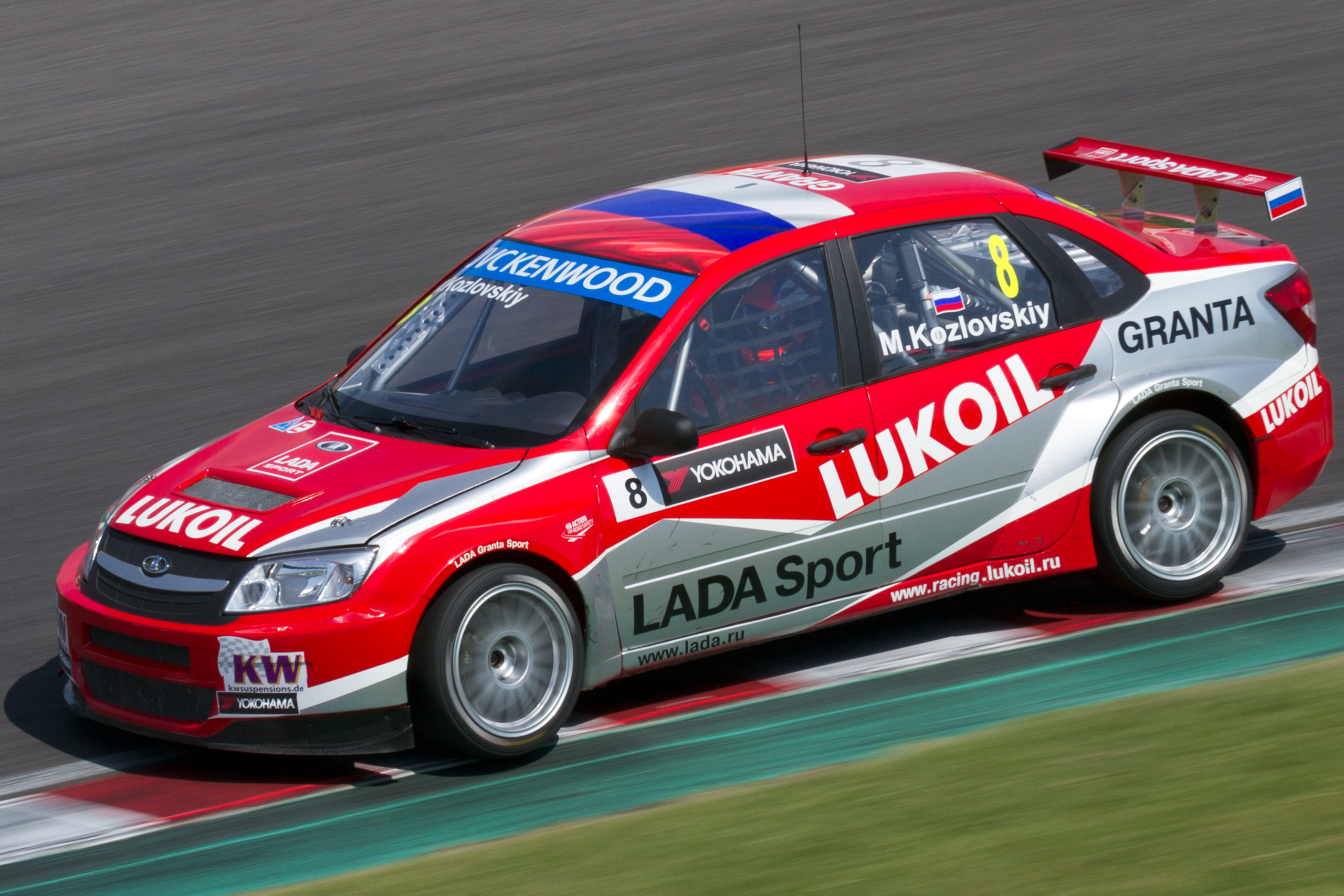
Lada Granta WTCC

In 1970, AvtoVAZ CEO Viktor Polyakov set the task to create sport versions of the Lada 2101. The engines were built in Italy, whereas fine tuning was done by engineers in Togliatti. In 1971, three sport cars based on the 2101 model took part in the Soviet Winter Rally Championship. Later in the same year, a VAZ-Autoexport team earned their first prize, the Silver Cup in the 1971 Tour d'Europe.

In the 1970s–1980s, the Autoexport racing team, using different Lada models, participated in different motorsport competitions. A special Zhiguli class was created for the Soviet Rally Championship. There were different rally and track races featuring Avtovaz sports cars. In 1978, a Lada Niva took part in the famous Dakar Rally. It was also successful in a number of international competitions. In 1981, Guy Moerenhout Racing made two special models for Lada Belgium: Lada 21011 RS Sport, model with two Weber carburetors and special sport equipment, and Lada Niva Dream, with big wing extension, special colours and larger wheels. In the late 1990s, Lada Canada supported a rally operation in the Canadian Rally Championship, winning in the 'Production 1750' class on numerous occasions.

In 2012, the Lada Granta Cup was launched. The first stage of the new race series began in Moscow on the Myachkovo race track.

=== World Touring Car Championship ===
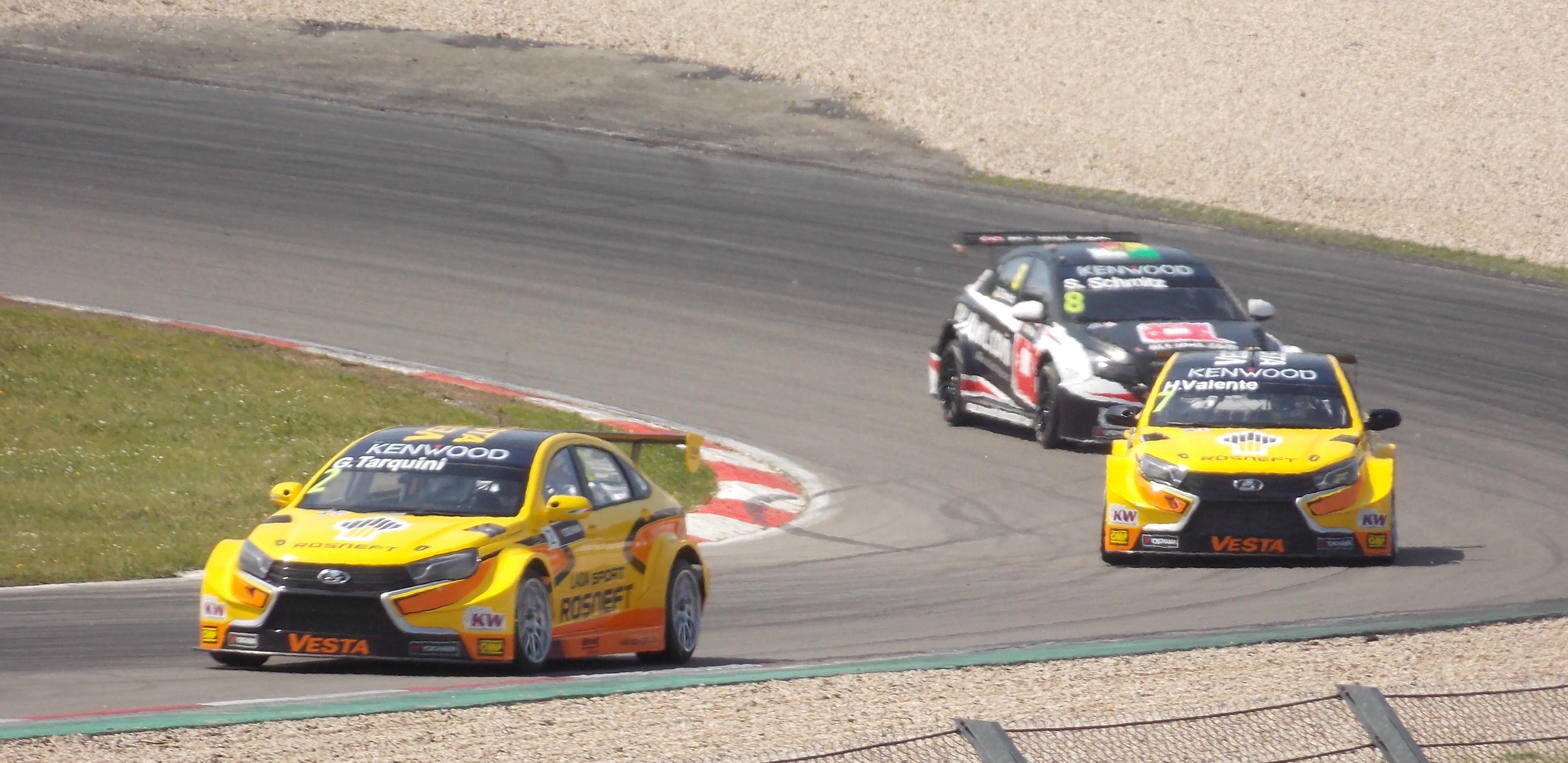
The two Lada Vestas of Gabriele Tarquini and Hugo Valente being chased by Sabine Schmitz in the 2016 WTCC season

In the 2013 season, AvtoVAZ returned to the WTCC championship through Lada Sport. The team used a new car: the Lada Granta WTCC, driven by WTCC World Champion Robert Huff.

The team returned for the 2014 World Touring Car Championship season, again fielding a Granta. Since the beginning of 2015, the Lada team took part in the WTCC as Lada Sport Rosneft. Starting in the 2015 season, Lada Sport used Lada Vestas. The official Lada Sport team left the category at the end of the 2016 season, although an unofficial entry by the RC Competition team kept the Vesta on the grid for another year. In 2021, Lada Sport had a one-off entry for the final race of the TCR-spec World Touring Car Cup at the Sochi Autodrom.

== Sponsorship ==
Lada sponsored the Renault F1 Team in 2010 after they signed Russia's first Formula One driver Vitaly Petrov.

== See also ==
- List of AvtoVAZ vehicles
- Automotive industry in the Soviet Union
- Automobile model numbering system in USSR and Russia
