= Lada Niva Travel =

Mini sport utility vehicle made by Lada

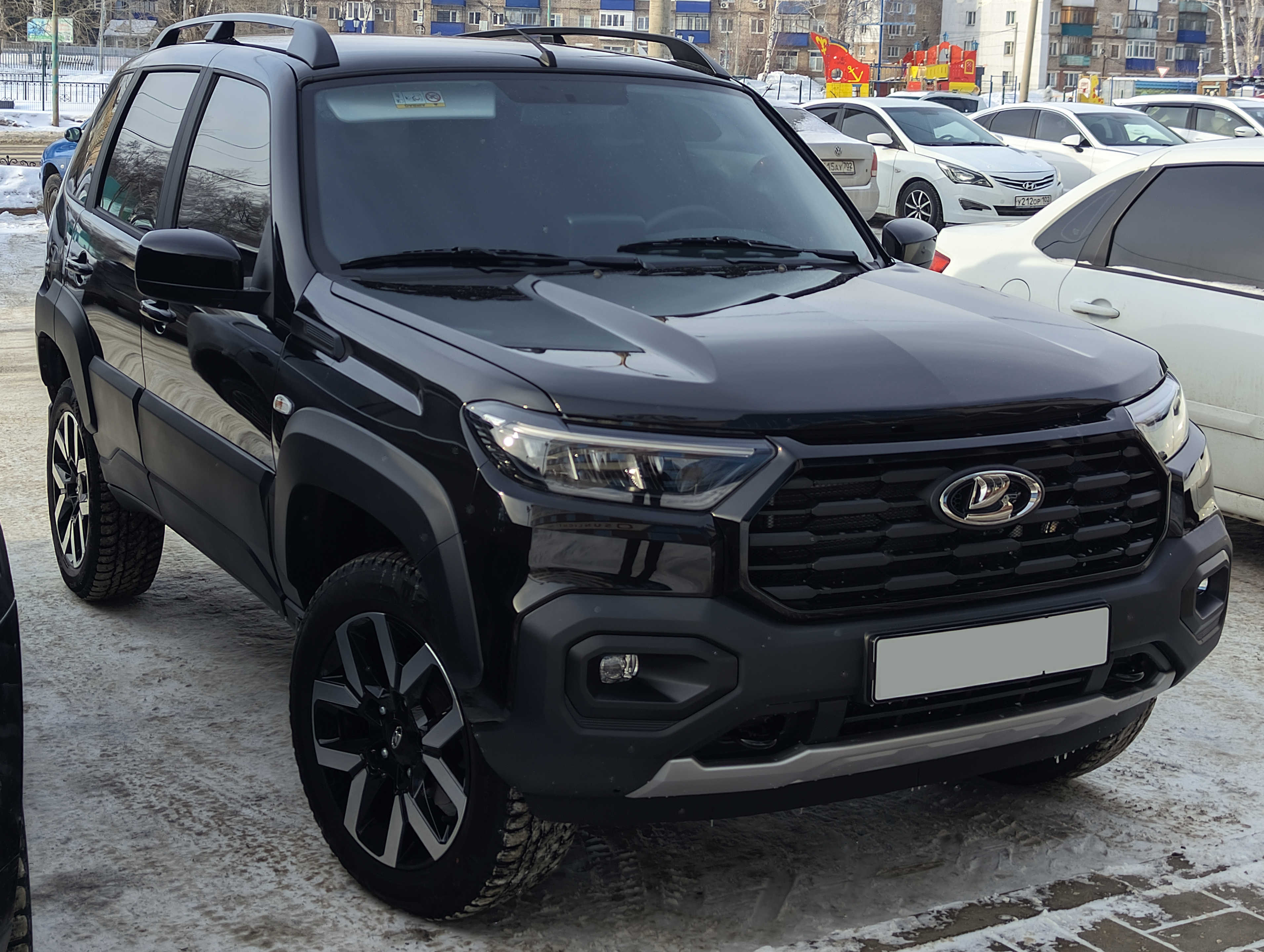

Overview
- Manufacturer: AvtoVAZ (1998–2002; 2020–present); GM-AvtoVAZ (2003–2020)
- Also called: VAZ-2123 (1998–2002); Chevrolet Niva (2003–2020); Lada Niva (2020); Lada Niva Travel (2021–present)
- Production: 1998–present
- Assembly: Russia: Tolyatti, Samara Oblast

Body and chassis
- Class: Mini SUV
- Body style: 5-door wagon
- Layout: Front-engine, four-wheel-drive

Powertrain
- Engine: 1.7 L I4 (petrol)
- Transmission: 5-speed manual

Dimensions
- Wheelbase: 2,450 mm (96.5 in)
- Length: 4,056 mm (159.7 in)
- Width: 1,800 mm (70.9 in)
- Height: 1,690 mm (66.5 in)

Chronology
- Predecessor: Lada Niva Legend

The Lada Niva Travel is a mini sport utility vehicle (SUV) produced since 1998 by the AvtoVAZ Group. Originally called the VAZ-2123 (1998–2002), the SUV was marketed as the Chevrolet Niva from 2003 to 2020, when AvtoVAZ (the parent company of the Lada brand) was in a joint venture with General Motors, called GM-AvtoVAZ.

However, after General Motors sold its 50-percent stake in the firm in 2020, the car was for a short time rebranded as the Lada Niva, giving the car then the same name that the original, 1977-launched Lada Niva/ Lada 4x4/ VAZ-2121 still has, in certain European markets — while the VAZ-2123 is also a development of its predecessor, VAZ-2121's mechanical underpinnings.

On 21 December 2020, the car was rebranded the 'Lada Niva Travel'.

== Overview ==
=== VAZ-2123 (1998–2002) ===
The VAZ-2123 was developed as a 5-door CUV, riding on a 2.45 m (96.5 in) wheelbase – the exact middle of the original Lada Niva (Legend) wheelbases of 2.20 m (87 in) and 2.70 m (106 in). Although the body and the interiors are all new, it is still based on the old VAZ 2121 engine, transmission and most mechanicals.

The Niva rebadging featured a touched-up body, and the 1.7-litre gasoline engine has fuel injection.

In 2003, the car was awarded zero stars out of a possible four by the Russian ARCAP safety assessment program.

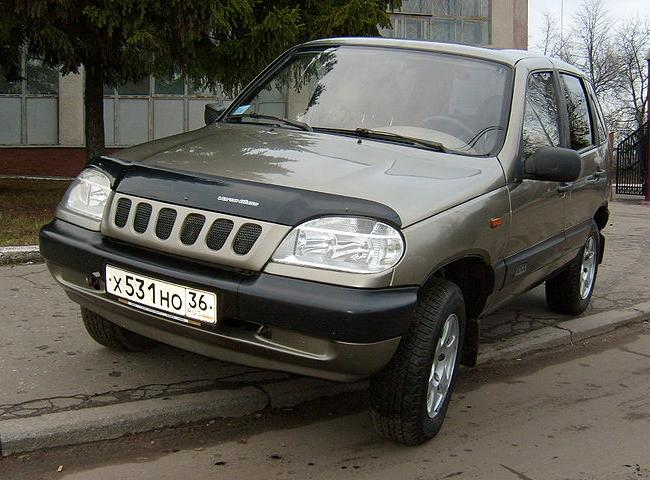
VAZ-2123 (1998–2002)

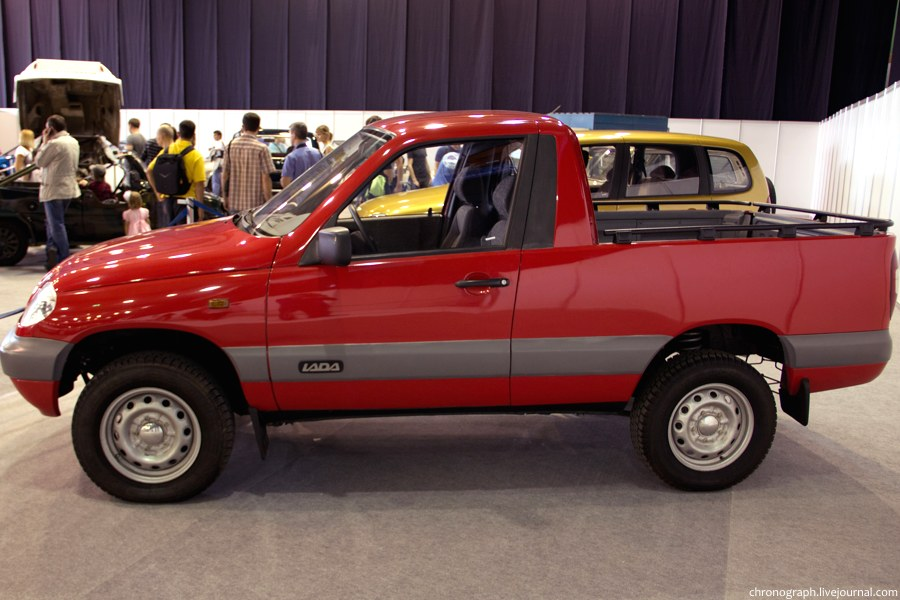
VAZ-2123 2-door Pick-Up concept

=== Chevrolet Niva (2003–2020) ===
In 2002, an agreement was signed with the American company General Motors to establish serial production of the model and a joint venture GM-AVTOVAZ was created: the license for the VAZ-2123 model and the rights to the Niva brand were transferred to a joint venture (while the first generation Niva was marketed as the "Lada 4×4" from 2006 until 2021).

An export version with reinforced bodyshell, 1.8-litre Opel Ecotec Family 1 gasoline engine, and Aisin four-wheel drive was under consideration since 2003. Although most of the engineering work was completed, the release was repeatedly postponed. Although GM-AvtoVAZ considered building a new engine plant for the local production of Ecotec engines, in July 2005 it was announced that the project was cancelled, along with plans for the long-anticipated "export" Niva. However, the project was revived in autumn 2006 and the "Niva FAM1" was introduced as a new trim level for the 2007 model year. The price was much higher than the standard trim, which led to slow sales and the discontinuation of this model in April 2008. Another reason was the ceasing of Ecotec engine production at the Hungarian plant.

In 2009, the model got a minor update, featuring a slight restyling, done by Bertone studio and some minor-changes. The GLS and GLC version also comes with improved safety, such as ABS and dual front airbags.

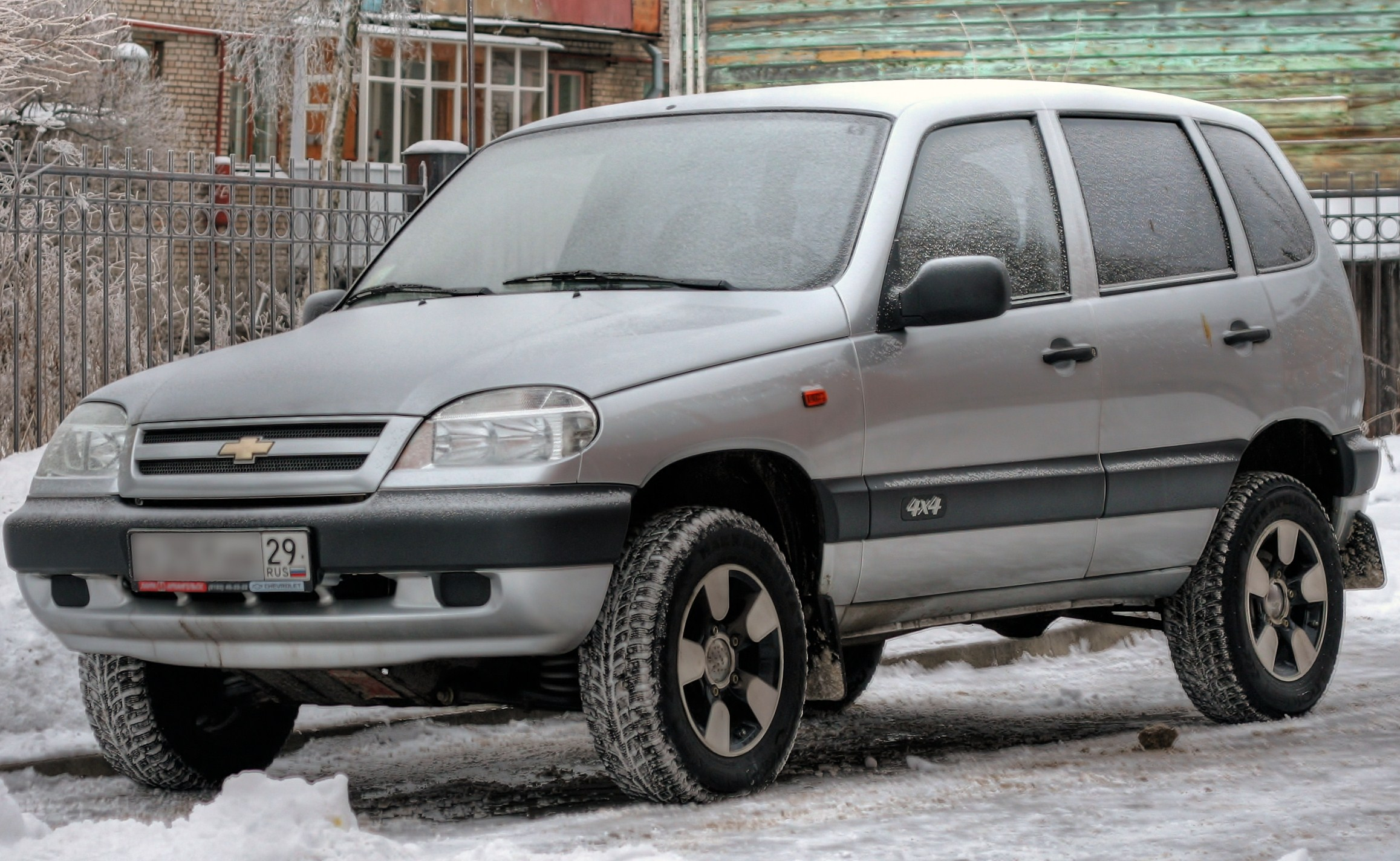
Chevrolet Niva (2003–2009)

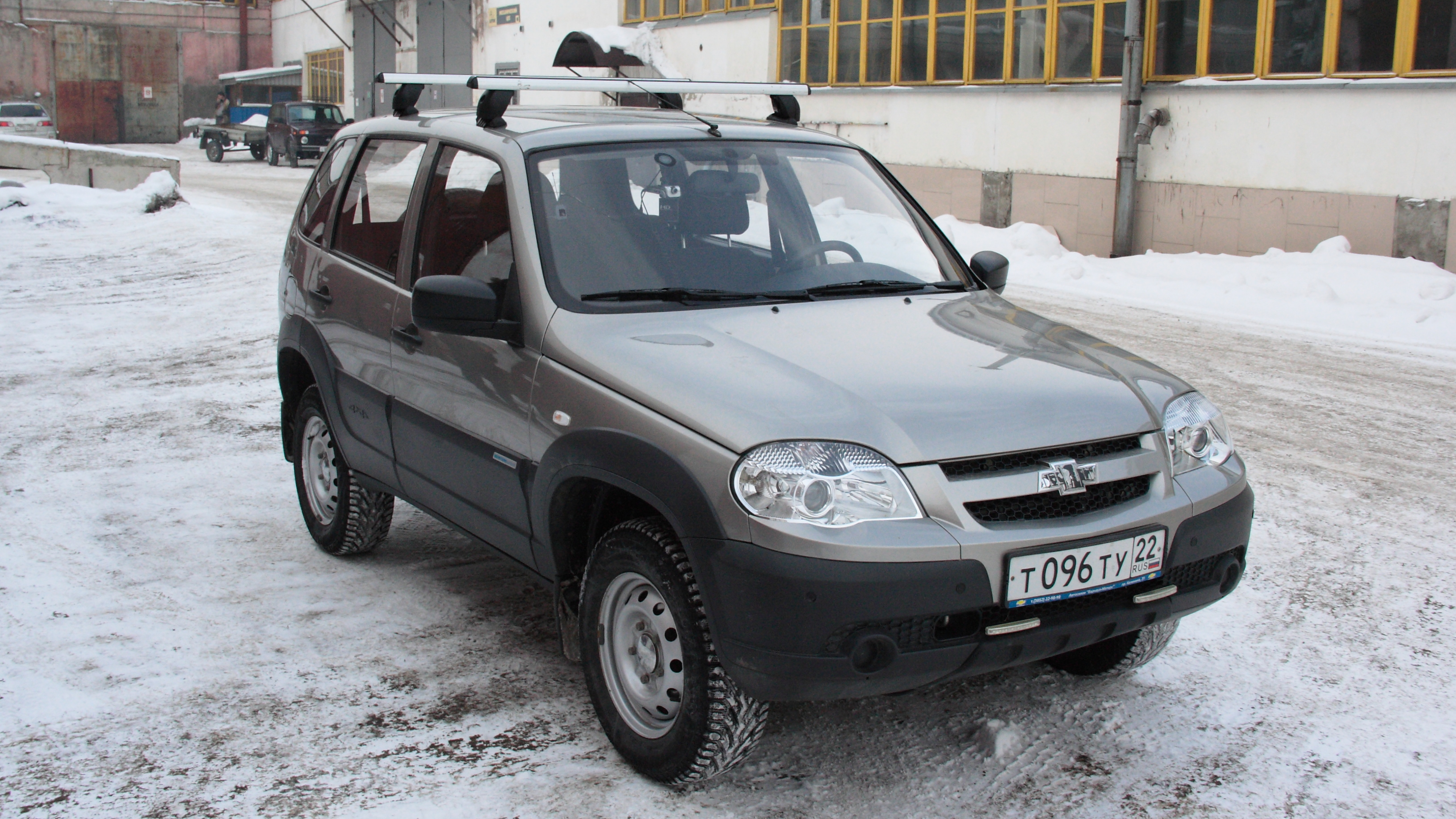
Chevrolet Niva (2009–2020)

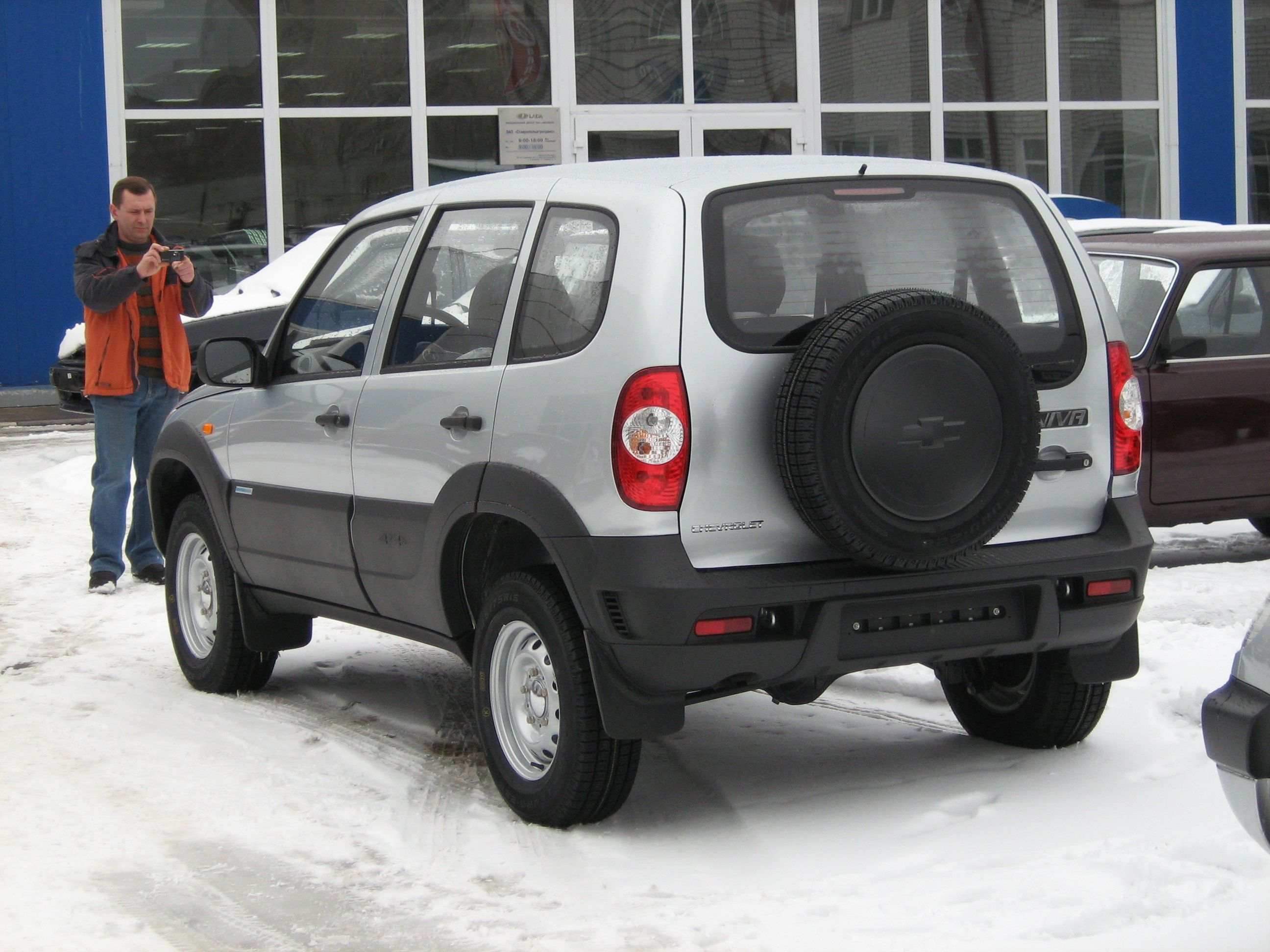
Chevrolet Niva (2009–2020)

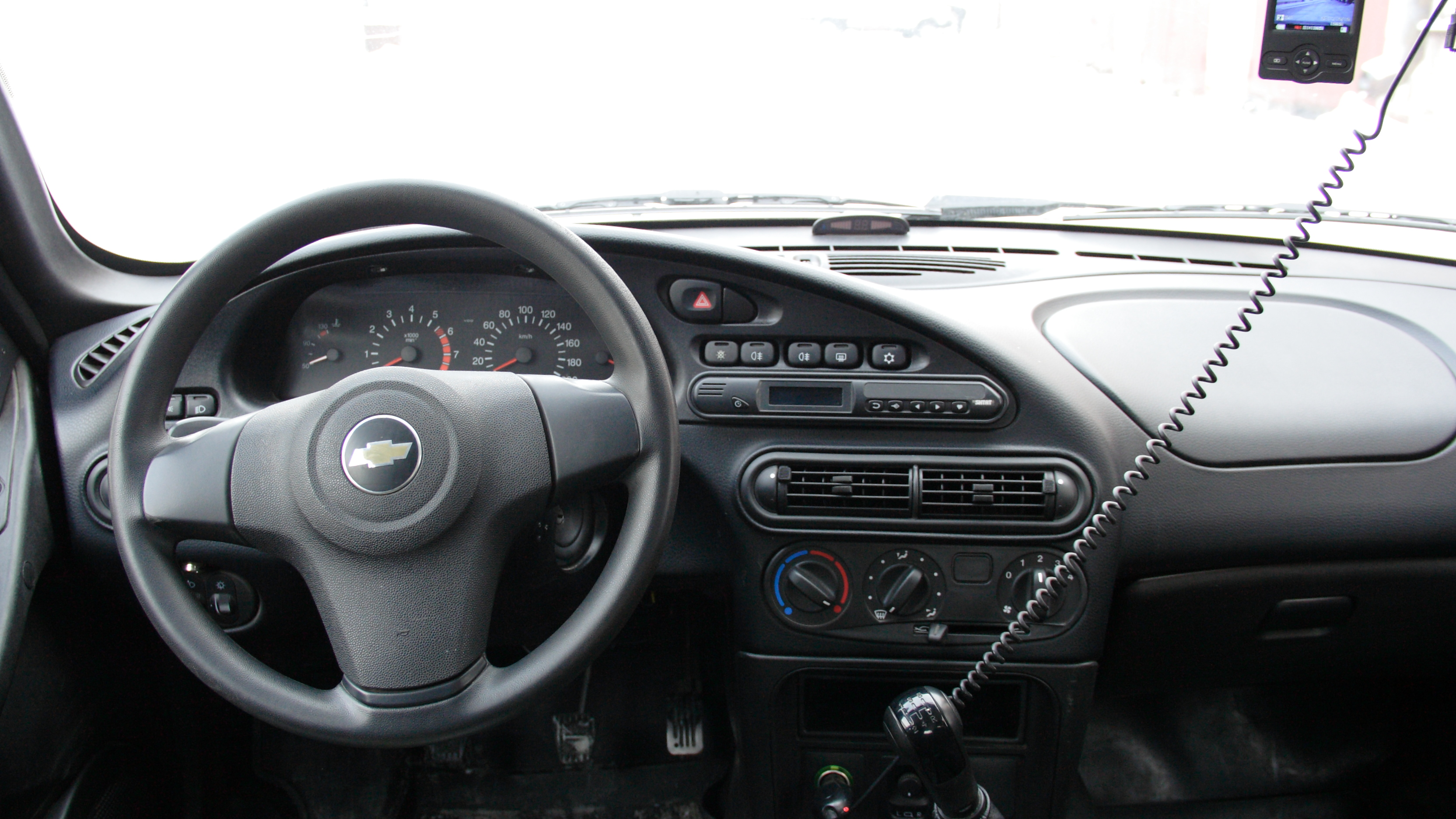
Chevrolet Niva Interior

Chevrolet Niva 1.7 Injection engine

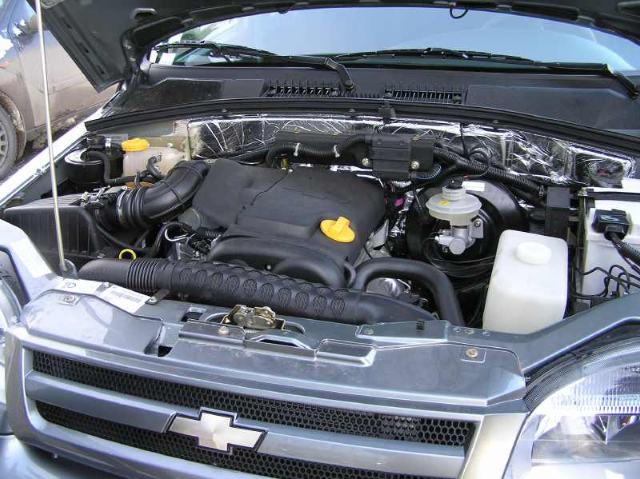
Chevrolet Niva FAM-1

=== Lada Niva / Lada Niva Travel (2020–present) ===
In August 2020 Lada took over production of the Chevrolet Niva, rebranding it as the Lada Niva.

In December 2020, following a new generation of the car, the new Lada Niva was further rebranded as Lada Niva Travel, while the old Niva 4x4 was rebranded as Lada Niva Legend in January 2021.

For 2026 AvtoVAZ announced Niva Travel getting a facelift and a 1.8 option, also an electric concept Lada e-Niva was shown.

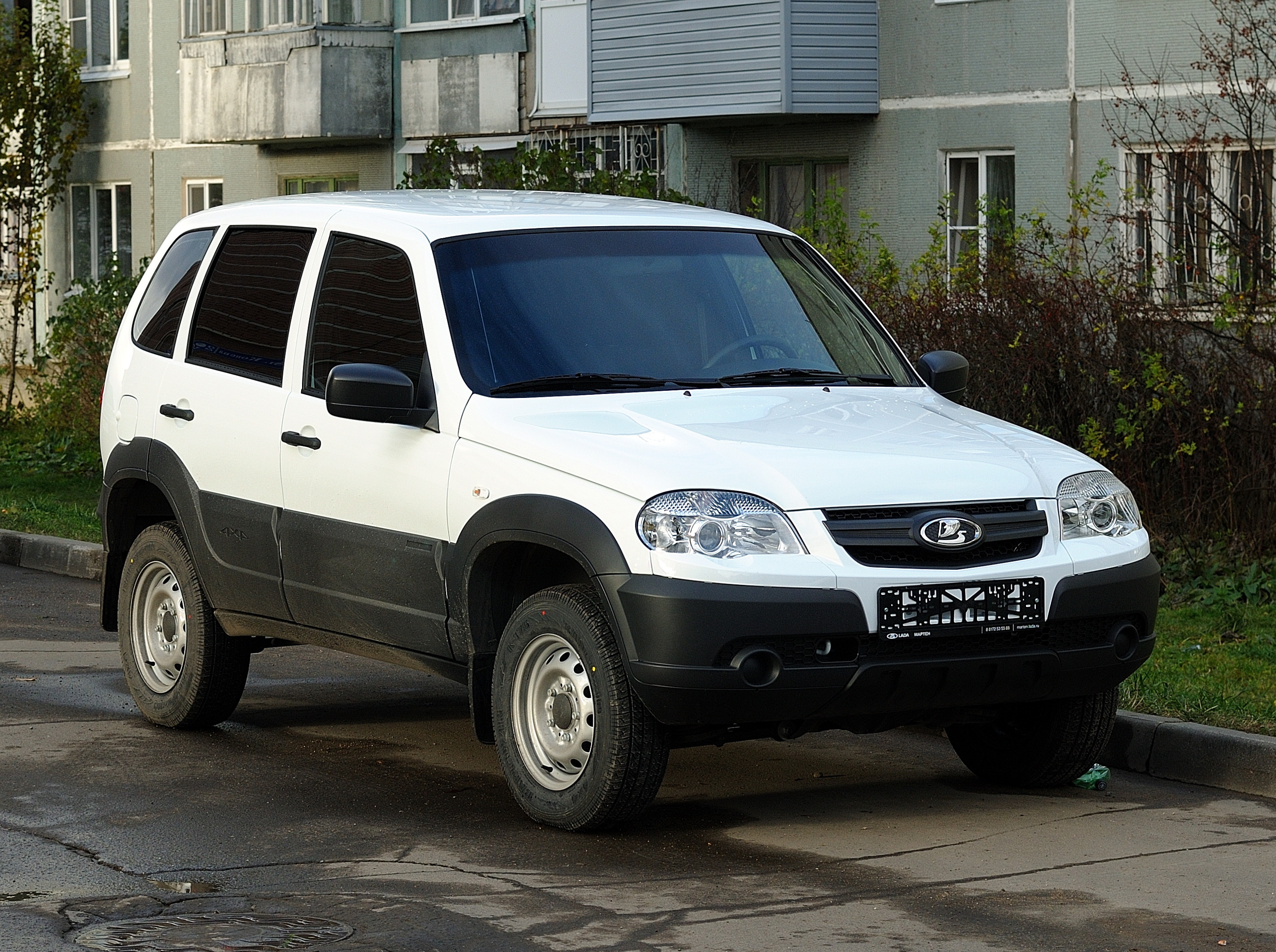
Lada Niva (2020)

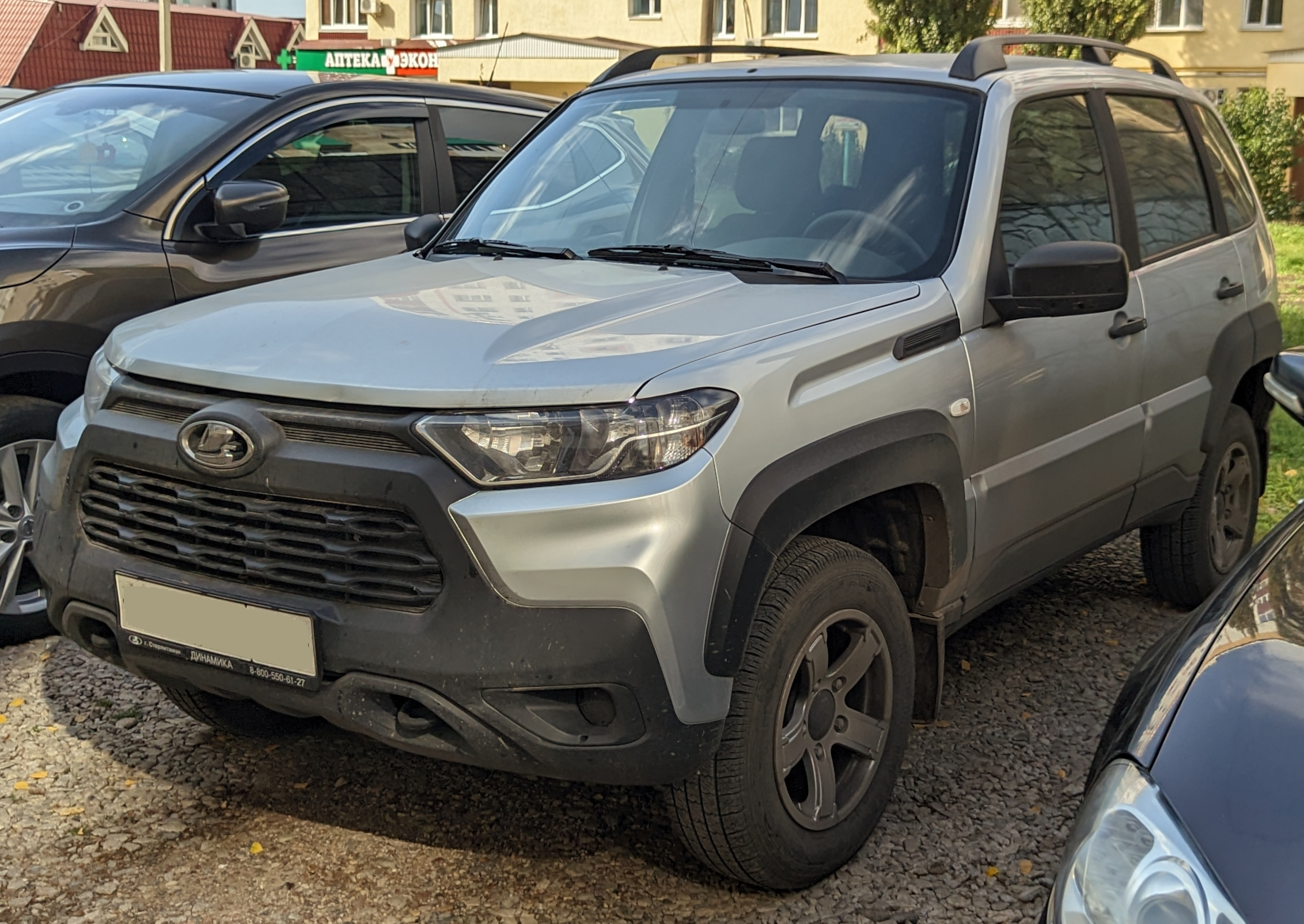
Lada Niva Travel (2021–2025)

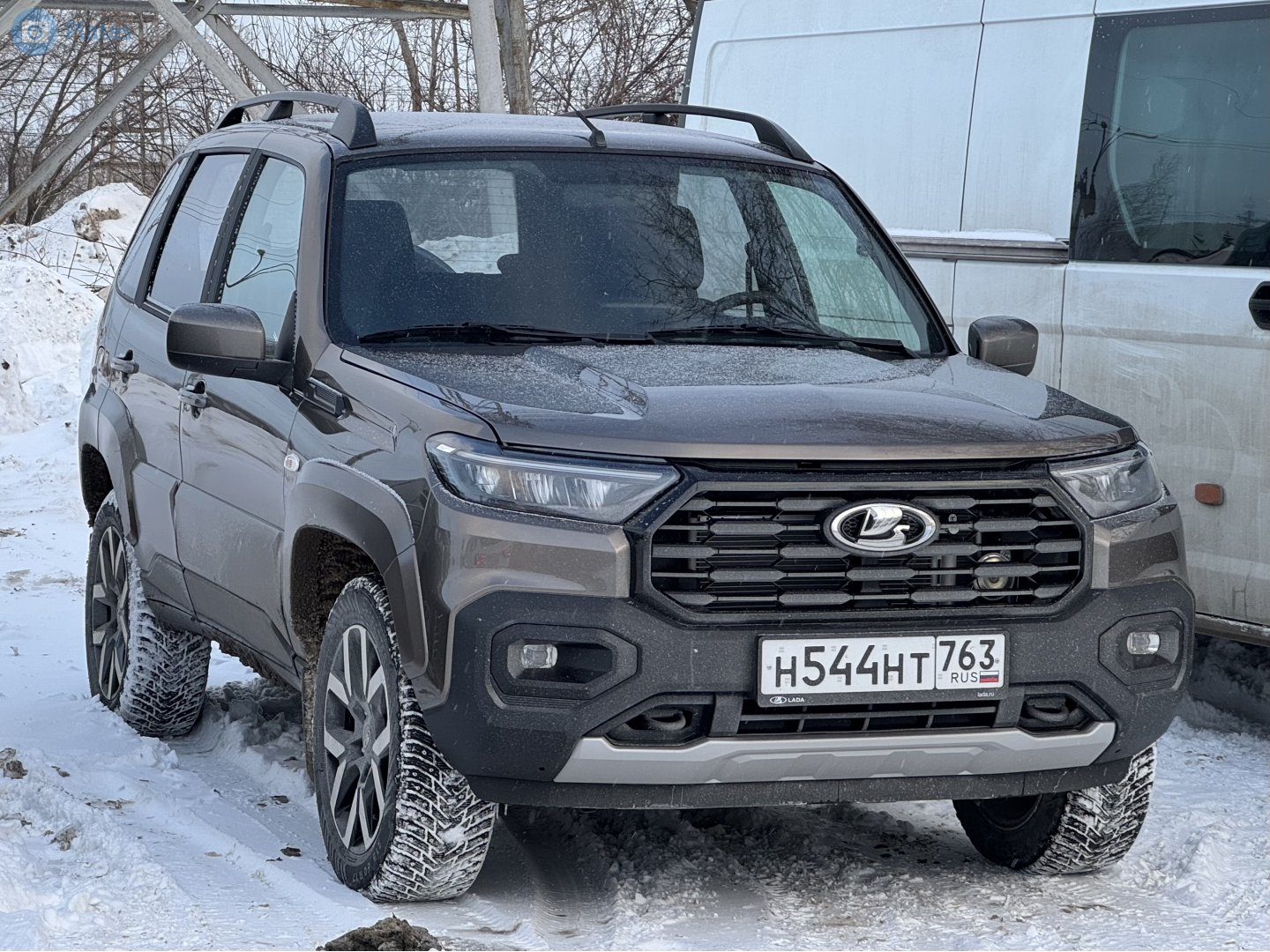
Lada Niva Travel (2025–present)

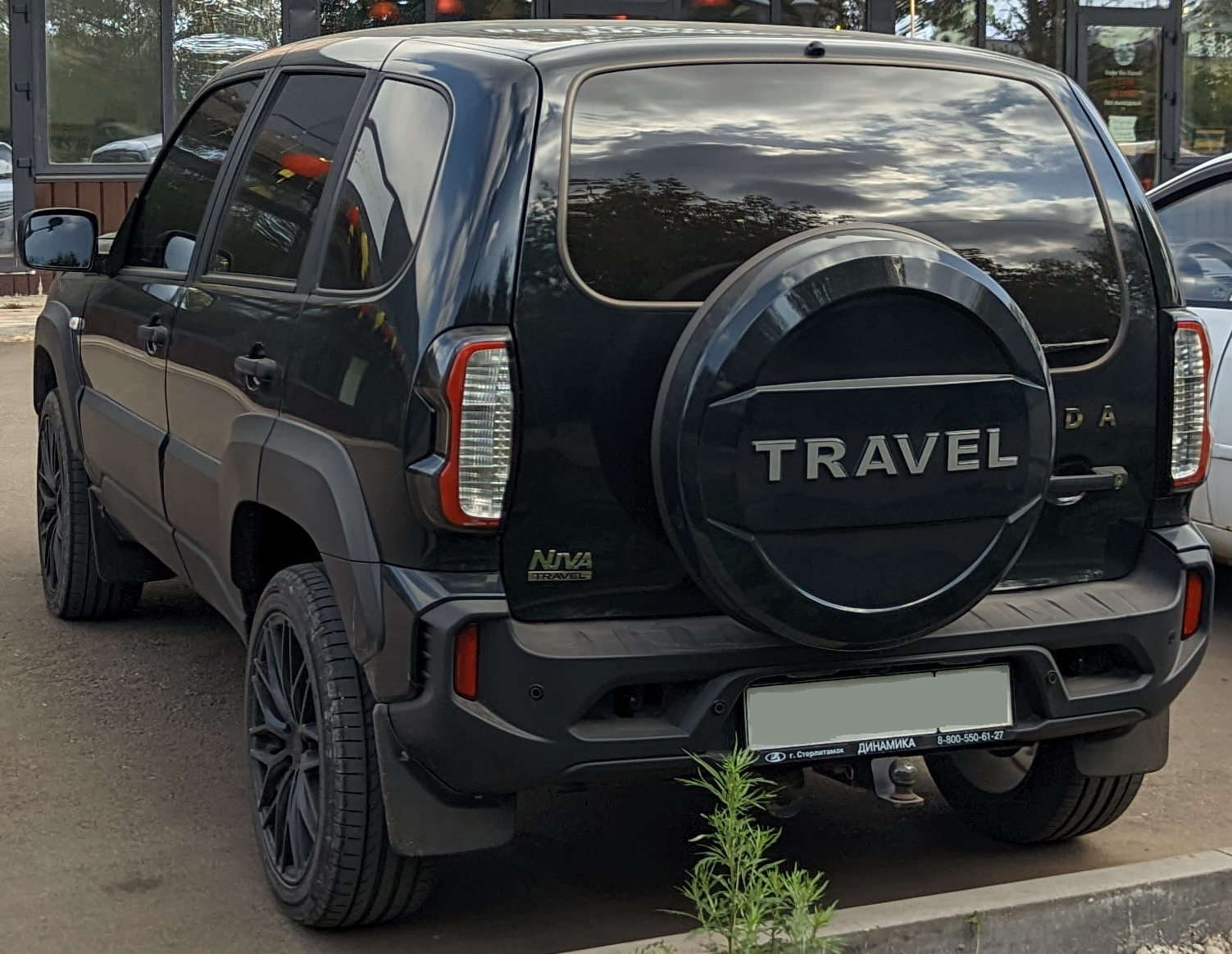
Lada Niva Travel (rear view)

== Concept cars ==
=== Chevrolet Niva Concept (2014) ===
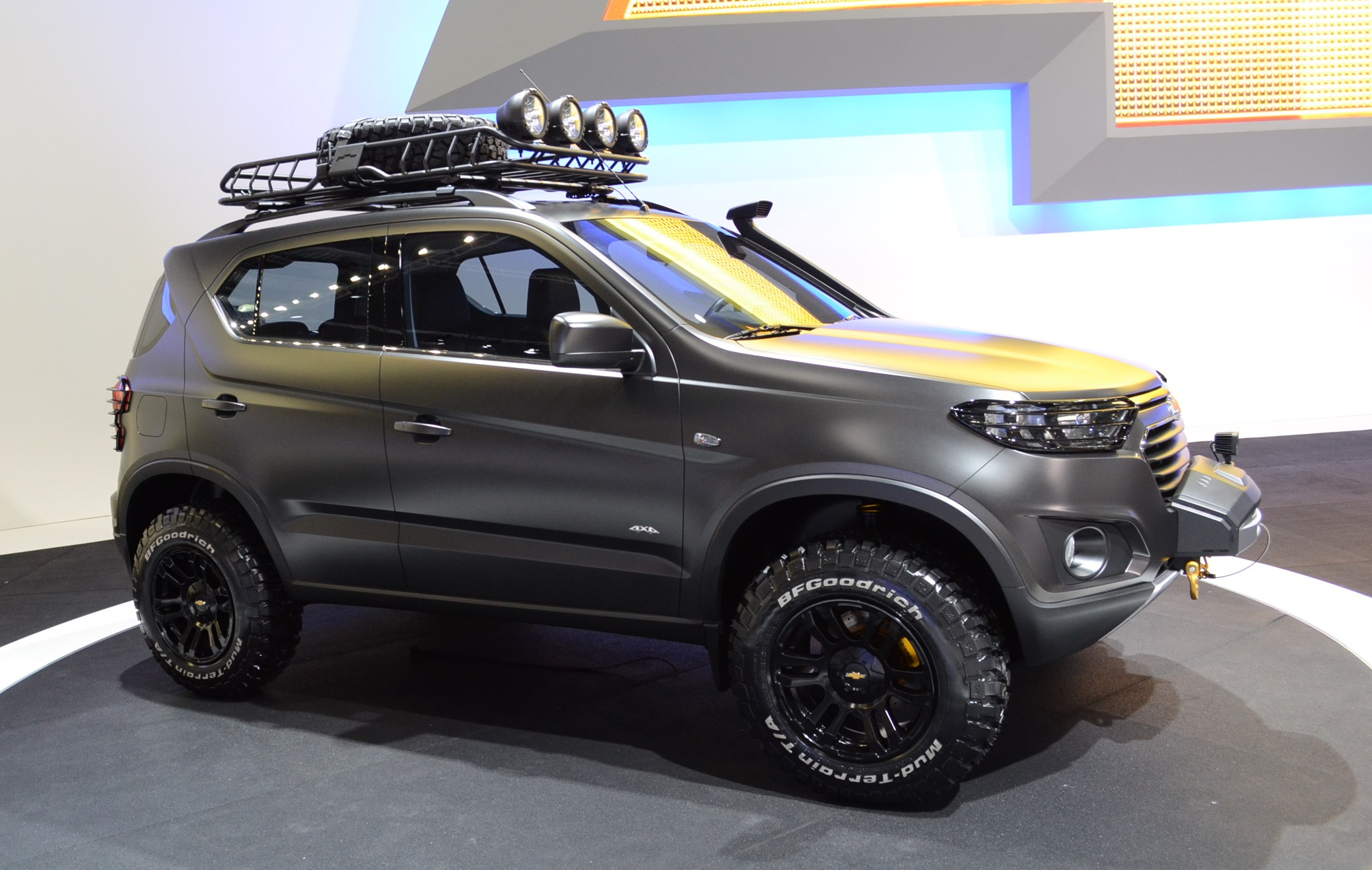
Chevrolet Niva Concept (2014)

GM-AvtoVAZ introduced a concept vehicle for a new generation of the Chevrolet Niva at the Moscow International Automobile Salon in late August 2014. The Niva Concept, designed by Ondrej Koromház of GM (or at General Motors' headquarters in Melbourne according to other sources), had a longitudinal mounted engine, full-time four-wheel-drive, two-gear transfer case and rigid-axle rear suspension. The production model was supposed to get a 1.8-liter PSA Peugeot Citroën EC8 engine (135 hp) paired with a 5-speed manual gearbox, although more recent news reports suggested that it was planned to be based on the Renault Duster platform. The new model's production version was initially expected in 2016, but following Chevrolet stopping sales of its mainstream models in Russia, no further information has been released on the topic.

In September 2018, it was reported that GM has suspended all the work on planned replacement of Chevrolet Niva.

=== Lada 4x4 Vision Concept (2018) ===
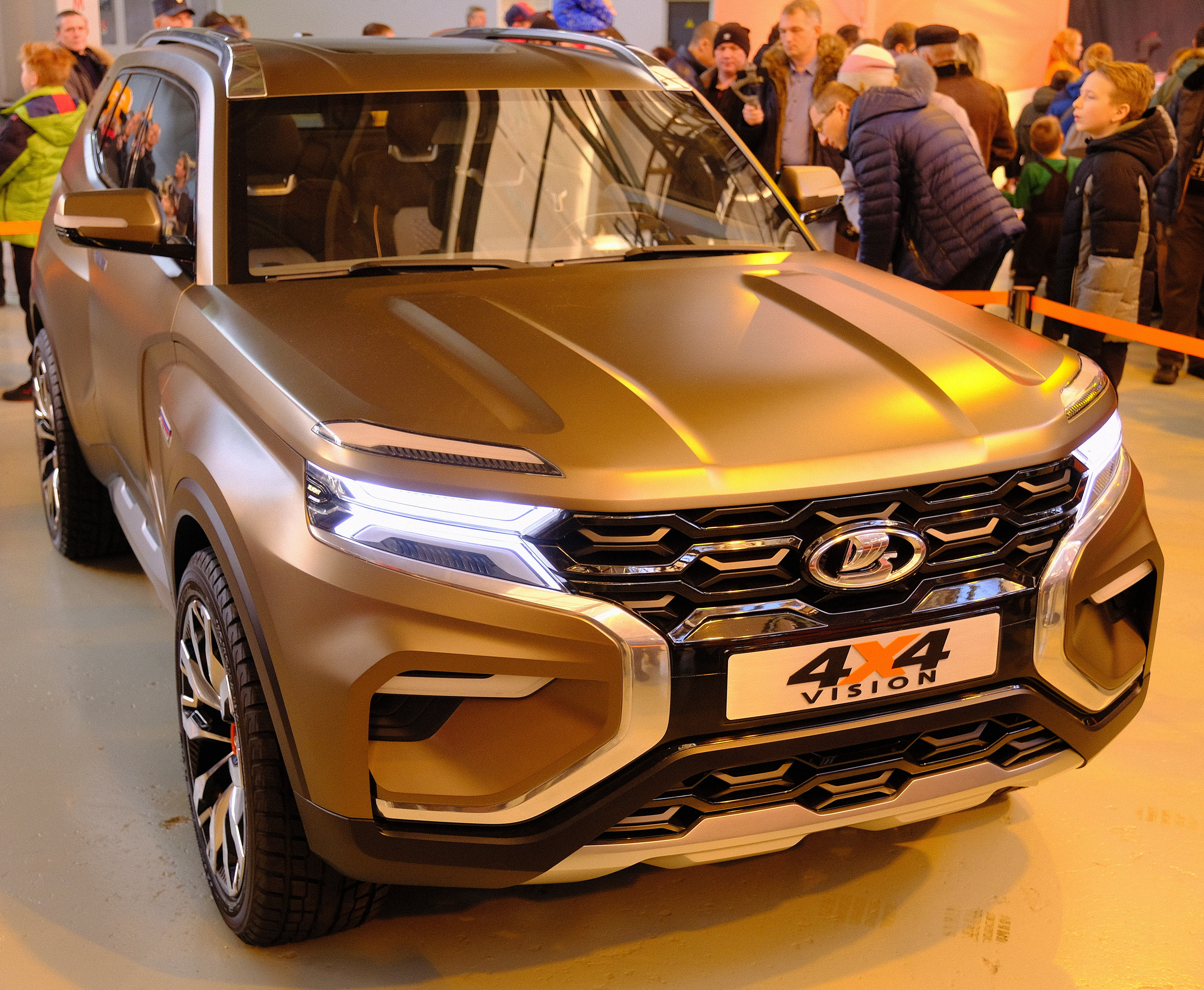
Lada 4x4 Vision Concept (2018)

In May 2018 AvtoVAZ patented the new concept car called the Lada 4x4 Vision. At a Moscow International Automobile Salon in August 2018, AvtoVAZ presented the concept, built in honour of the original Niva's 40th anniversary. According to preliminary information, the car would be based on Renault Duster and production was scheduled to start in 2022 at the earliest.

=== Lada T-134 (2025) ===
After Steve Mattin left AvtoVAZ in 2021 Jean-Philippe Salar was chosen as the new chief designer, he began to work on another concept of Niva's third generation which had to be based on CMF and unified with Dacia Duster and Dacia Bigster. Russian engineers were supposed to develop an all-wheel-drive system for the car. The work on the project was stopped when Groupe Renault dropped Lada in response to Russian invasion of Ukraine in 2022. In the summer of 2023 AvtoVAZ renewed the work by themselves, switching the platform of the almost finished car to Lada Vesta chassis. In 2025 the concept was showcased to the President of Russia Vladimir Putin under the name T-134 that might be a reference to both T-34 tank and Tu-134 plane.

In 2026 T-134 design got patented. At SPIEF-2025 AvtoVAZ president Maksim Sokolov that the car design is finalized and may be further developed into a serial model if the company will have enough time and budget and choose the right market niche.

== Technical parameters ==
Permissible gross weight of the towed trailer, kg:

trailer with brakes — 1200

trailer without brakes — 600

Turning radius, m — 5.7

Front suspension — spring, independent, 2-lever

Rear suspension — spring, dependent, 5-rod

Front disc brakes

Rear drum brakes

Vacuum booster — 9"

Tire dimensions — 205/75R15, 205/70R15, 215/75R15, 215/65R16

== See also ==
- UAZ Patriot, similar SUV from UAZ
- Lada Niva Legend
