= Lada West Togliatti =

Russian car manufacturer

JSC Lada West Togliatti
- Native name: АО Лада (LADA) Запад Тольятти
- Industry: Automotive
- Predecessor: GM-AvtoVAZ
- Founded: December 2019 (de facto); 15 April 2020 (de jure)
- Headquarters: Tolyatti, Russia
- Key people: Yuri Skulsky (Director)
- Products: Cars
- Revenue: ▲13,140.93 million ₽ (2020)
- Operating income: ▲191.49 million ₽ (2020)
- Net income: ▲ -229.04 million ₽ (2020)
- Total assets: ▼3,982.61 million ₽ (2020)
- Total equity: ▼1,619.88 million ₽ (2020)
- Parent: AvtoVAZ

Lada West Togliatti (Russian: Лада Запад Тольятти, IPA: [ˈladə ˈzapət tɐlʲˈjætʲ(ː)ɪ]) is a Russian car manufacturer owned by AvtoVAZ. The company came from GM-AvtoVAZ, a joint venture between AvtoVAZ and General Motors.

== History ==
Lada West Togliatti predecessor was GM-AvtoVAZ, a joint venture created in early 2001 for producing the VAZ-2123 (Niva II) off-road vehicle under the name Chevrolet Niva. Initially, the venture had three co-owners: AvtoVAZ and General Motors (GM) each owned 41.6% of the shares, and the remaining 16.8% belonged to the European Bank for Reconstruction and Development (EBRD). In 2012, the EBRD withdrew from the venture, selling its shares equally to partners.

In December 2019, GM sold its stake to AvtoVAZ, making GM-AvtoVAZ a wholly owned subsidiary of the latter. The former venture kept the right to continue using the Chevrolet marque for a certain amount of time. On 15 April 2020, AvtoVAZ officially dropped the GM-AvtoVAZ name and re-incorporated the former venture as "JSC Lada West Togliatti".

In July 2020, Lada West Togliatti stopped assembling Chevrolet-badged Nivas, adopting instead the Lada marque. In December 2020, Lada West Togliatti introduced the Niva Travel, a revised Niva.

In July 2021, the Lada Travel production was transferred to the main AvtoVAZ's Tolyatti plant. AvtoVAZ CEO Nicolas Maure clarified that the Lada West Togliatti production would be "suspended" but the plant was to be neither closed nor sold.

== Leadership ==
The first general director of Lada West Togliatti was Romuald Rytvinski who also hold the same position while it was a joint venture with GM. In December 2020, he was replaced by Yuri Skulsky, the then human resources chief of the company.
