= List of AvtoVAZ vehicles =

This is a list of vehicles designed or produced by AvtoVAZ, a Russian carmaker best known under its Lada brand.

== Current models ==
Image	Model	Introduction	Update	Body styles	Original
	Azimut	2026		Crossover SUV	
	Iskra	2025		Sedan; Station wagon	
	Aura	2024		Sedan	
	Vesta	2015	2022; 2023	Sedan; Station wagon	
	Largus	2012	2019; 2021	Station wagon Panel van	Dacia Logan MCV
	Granta	2011	2018	Sedan; Liftback; Station wagon	
	Niva Travel	1998	2002; 2009; 2020; 2021	SUV	
	Niva Legend	1977	1994; 2009; 2019	SUV; Pickup truck Chassis cab	

== Historic models ==
Image	Model	Introduction	Update	Discontinued	Body styles	Original
	2101 Zhiguli	1970		1988	Sedan	Fiat 124
	2102 Zhiguli	1971		1986	Station wagon	Fiat 124
	2103 Zhiguli	1972		1984	Sedan	Fiat 124
	2106 Zhiguli	1976		2006	Sedan	Fiat 124
	2105 Zhiguli	1980		2010	Sedan	Fiat 124
	2104 Zhiguli	1984		2012	Station wagon	Fiat 124
	2107 Zhiguli	1984		2012	Sedan	Fiat 124
	Samara	1984	1994; 1997	2013	Hatchback; Sedan; Coupe; Convertible; Panel van	
	1111 Oka	1988		2008	Hatchback; Panel van	
	110	1995		2008	Sedan; Coupe; Hatchback; Station wagon	
	Nadezhda	1998		2006	Minivan	
	Kalina	2004	2013	2018	Hatchback; Station wagon Sedan	
	Priora	2007	2011	2018	Sedan; Coupe; Hatchback; Station wagon	
	XRAY	2016		2022	SUV	

== Racing, experimental or future models ==
=== Racing models ===
Image	Model	Introduction	Discontinued	Body styles
	Revolution II	2004	2008	Roadster

=== Experimental models ===
Image	Model	Introduction	Body styles	Original
	Krokodil	1971	SUV	
	Cheburashka	1971	Hatchback	
	Autoroller	1973	SUV	
	Reka	1974	SUV	
	2105	1976	Sedan	Fiat 124
	Poni	1979	SUV	
	2110	1990	Sedan	
	Elf	1991	Hatchback	
	Bora	1995	SUV	
	2120	1996	Minivan	
	Rapan	1998	Hatchback	
	Peter Turbo	2000	Hatchback	
	Golf	2001	Golf cart	
	Neoklassika	2002	Station wagon	
	Revolution	2003	Roadster	
	Oka-2	2003	Hatchback	
	Kalina 4x4	2004	SUV	
	Siluet	2004	Sedan	
	C Concept	2007	Hatchback	
	C-Cross	2008	SUV	
	Revolution III	2008	Roadster	
	XRAY	2012	SUV	
	XCODE	2016	SUV	
	4x4 Vision	2018		
	X-Cross 5	2023	SUV	Bestune T77
	T-134	2025	SUV	

== Index designations ==
Each model has an internal index that reflects the level of modifications, based on the engine and other options installed. For example, the VAZ-21103 variant has the 1.5 L 16V engine, while the VAZ-21104 uses the latest 1.6 L 16V fuel injection engine. Since 2001, trim levels are also indicated by including a number after the main index: '-00' means base trim level, '-01' means standard trim and '-02' designates deluxe version; for example, VAZ-21121-02 means Lada 112 hatchback with a 1.6L SOHC engine and deluxe trim.

The car's name is formed from 'VAZ-index model name. The classic Fiat 124-derived models were known on the domestic market as Zhiguli (Жигули) until the late-1990s, when the name was dropped; thus, the 2104-2107 range, as well as 110-series, actually lack a model name. The restyled Sputnik range was renamed Samara, but the Niva and the Oka retained their names. By the 2000s (decade), the VAZ designation was dropped from market names in favour of Lada and simplified export naming conventions were adopted, so VAZ-2104 effectively became Lada 2104, VAZ-2110 became Lada 110, VAZ-2114 became Lada Samara hatchback or Lada 114 and so on, though model indices continue to be used in both technical and marketing materials.

The model names varied from market to market and as such should not be used except to indicate a certain export market. Instead, it is advisable to refer solely to the model number as these are the same for all markets.

=== Classic Zhiguli ===
Details
Index name	Engine	Export name	Production years	Notes
2101 sedan
2101	1.2L	Lada 1200	1970–1982	Left-hand drive
21011	1.3L	Lada 1300	1974–1981	Left-hand drive
21012	1.2L	-	-	Right-hand drive
21013	1.2L	Lada 1200 S	1977–1988	Left-hand drive
21016	1.5L	-	-	Police version
21018	0.7L	-	-	Wankel engine VAZ-311
21019	1.4L	-	-	Wankel engine VAZ-411
2102 station wagon
2102	1.2L	Lada 1200 Combi	1972–1986	Left-hand drive
21021	1.3L	Lada 1300 Combi	1978–1981	Left-hand drive
21022	1.2L	-	-	Right-hand drive
21024	1.3L	-	-	Right-hand drive
21023	1.5L	Lada 1500 Combi	1977–1984	Left-hand drive
21026	1.5L	-	-	Right-hand drive
2103 sedan
2103	1.5L	Lada 1500	1972–1984	Left-hand drive
21033	1.3L	Lada 1300 S	1977–1983	Export only
21035	1.2L	Lada 1200SL	1972–1981	Export only
2106 sedan
2106	1.6L	Lada 1600	1976–2001/2005	Left-hand drive
21061	1.5L	Lada 1500 S	1976–1988	Left-hand drive
21062	1.6L	Lada 1600	1976–2001	Right-hand drive, export only
21063	1.3L	Lada 1300 SL	1976–1988	Left-hand drive, budget version
21064	1.6L	Lada 1600 SL	-	Deluxe version, export only, 5-speed gearshift
21065	1.6L	-	1990–2001	Deluxe version, export only, 5-speed gearshift
2104 station wagon
2104	1.3L	Lada Nova 1300 Brake; Lada Nova 1300 Estate; Lada Nova 1300 Family	1984–1994	
21041	1.6L	Lada Laika	2000–2004	5-speed gearshift
21043	1.5L	Lada Nova 1500 Brake; Lada Nova 1500 Estate; Lada Nova 1500 Family	1984–2004	5-speed gearshift
21044	1.7L	Lada Nova 1700 Brake; Lada Nova 1700 Estate; Lada Nova 1700 Family	-	Export only; CPI fuel injection from GM
21045	1.5L Diesel	-	-	Export only; licensed diesel engine
21046	1.3L	-	-	Right-hand drive
21047	1.5L	-	-	Luxury version of 21043, right-hand drive
2105 sedan
2105	1.3L	Lada Nova; Lada 1300 L	1979–1995	
21051	1.2L	Lada Junior; Lada 1200 S	1979–1995	
21053	1.5L	Lada Nova; Lada Laika	1979–2004	
21054	1.6L	-	-	Police version; additional fuel tank and battery
21056	1.3L	Lada Riva	1983–1997	Right-hand drive
21057	1.5L	Lada Riva	1983–1997	Right-hand drive
21058	1.2L	Lada Riva	1983–1997	Right-hand drive
21059	-	-	-	Police version; comes with VAZ-4132 Wankel engine
2105 VFTS	1.6L	-	1982	High performance version with 160 hp (119 kW) engine (1.8l with 240 hp turbocharged)
2107 sedan
2107	1.5L	Lada 1500 SL; Lada Riva; Lada Laika	1982–2004	
21072	1.3L	-	1982–1995	
21073	1.7L	Lada Riva; Lada Laika	1991–2001	Export only; CPI fuel injection from GM
21074	1.6L	-	-	Police version; additional fuel tank and battery
21079	2.6L	-	-	Police version; comes with VAZ-4132 Wankel engine

=== Original ===
Details
Index name	Engine	Export name	Production years	Notes
2121 Niva off-roader
2121	1.6L	Lada Niva	1977–1993	four-wheel drive
21213	1.7L	Lada Niva	1993	four-wheel drive; restyled rear door
21214	1.7L	Lada Niva	1993	four-wheel drive; restyled rear door; CPI fuel injection from GM
2131 Niva off-roader
2131	1.7L	Lada Niva	1995	extended 5-door version of 2121
2123 Niva off-roader
2123	1.7L	Lada Niva	1998-2002	
2123	1.7L	Chevrolet Niva	2002	Modified version of 2123 produced by GM-AvtoVAZ; multi-point fuel injection
2108 Sputnik 3-door hatchback
2108	1.3L	Lada Samara 1300	1984–2001	
21081	1.2L	Lada Samara 1100	1984–1996	Export only
21083	1.5L	Lada Samara 1500	1984–2001	
21083i	1.5L	Lada Samara 1500i	1993–2001	Multi-point fuel injection
21086	1.3L	Lada Samara 1300	1990–1996	Export only; right-hand drive for United Kingdom
21087	1.2L	Lada Samara 1100	1990–1996	Export only; right-hand drive for United Kingdom
21088	1.5L	Lada Samara 1500	1990–1996	Export only; right-hand drive for United Kingdom
1706	1.5L	Lada Chelnok	1990	Pickup truck version of 2108
2108-91				Police version; comes with VAZ-415 Wankel engine
2109 Sputnik 5-door hatchback
2109	1.3L	Lada Samara L 1300	1987–1997	
21091	1.2L	Lada Samara L 1100	1987–1996	Export only
21093	1.5L	Lada Samara L 1500	1990–2001	
21093i	1.5L	Lada Samara L 1500i	1993–2001	Multi-point fuel injection
21096	1.3L	Lada Samara L 1300	1990–1996	Export only; right-hand drive for United Kingdom
21098	1.5L	Lada Samara L 1500	1990–1996	Export only; right-hand drive for the United Kingdom
2109-90				Police version; comes with VAZ-415 Wankel engine
21099 Sputnik sedan
21099	1.5L	Lada Samara Forma 1500	1990–2001	
21099i	1.5L	Lada Samara Forma 1500i	1993–2001	Multi-point fuel injection
210993	1.3L	Lada Samara Forma 1300	1990–2001	
1111 Oka micro-car
1111	0.7L		1988–1990	Licensed to SeAZ and KamAZ
11113	0.8L		1990	Kama, produced at KamAZ
2120 Nadezhda minivan
2120	1.8L		1998	Based on 2131; carburetor
21204	1.7L		1998	CPI fuel injection from GM
2110 sedan
2110	1.5L		1996–2001	carburetor
21102	1.5L	Lada 110	1998–2004	8V i
21103	1.5L	Lada 110	1998–2004	16V i
21101	1.6L	Lada 110	2004	8V i
21104	1.6L	Lada 110	2004	16V i
21105	1.7L		1996-??	carburetor
21106	2.0L			Opel C20XE (by external car tuner)
21108	1.8L	Lada Premier		A "limousine" with increased wheelbase and up-stroked engine (by external car tuner)
2111 station wagon
21110	1.5L	Lada 111	1998–2004	8V i
21111	1.5L		1998–2001	carburetor
21113	1.5L	Lada 111	2000–2004	16V i
21114	1.6L	Lada 111	2004	16V, i
2112 hatchback
21120	1.5L	Lada 112	2000–2004	16V, i
21122	1.5L	Lada 112	2000–2004	8V i
21121	1.6L	Lada 112	2004	8V i
21124	1.6L	Lada 112	2004	16V i
2113 Samara 3-door hatchback
21130	1.5L	Lada Samara	2004	Restyled 21083; 8V i
2114 Samara 5-door hatchback
21140	1.5L	Lada Samara	2001	Restyled 21093; 8V i
2115 Samara sedan
21150	1.5L	Lada Samara	2001	Restyled 210993; 8V i
1118 Kalina sedan
11170	1.6L	Lada Kalina	2004	8V i
1119 Kalina hatchback
11190	1.6L	Lada Kalina	2005	16V i
1117 Kalina station wagon
11170	1.6L	Lada Kalina	2006	16V i
2170 Priora sedan
21701	1.6L	Lada Priora	2008	8V i
21703	1.6L	Lada Priora	2007	16V i
2172 Priora hatchback
21721	1.6L	Lada Priora	2008	8V i
21723	1.6L	Lada Priora	2008	16V i
2171 Priora station wagon
21713	1.6L	Lada Priora	2009	16V i
21728 Priora Coupe 3-door
21728	1.6L	Lada Priora	2010	16V i
2190 Granta sedan
2190	1.6L	Lada Granta	2011	8V i

== See also ==
- List of GAZ vehicles
- List of Moskvitch vehicles
- List of ZiL vehicles
