= Lada Revolution =

Series of Russian racing prototype cars

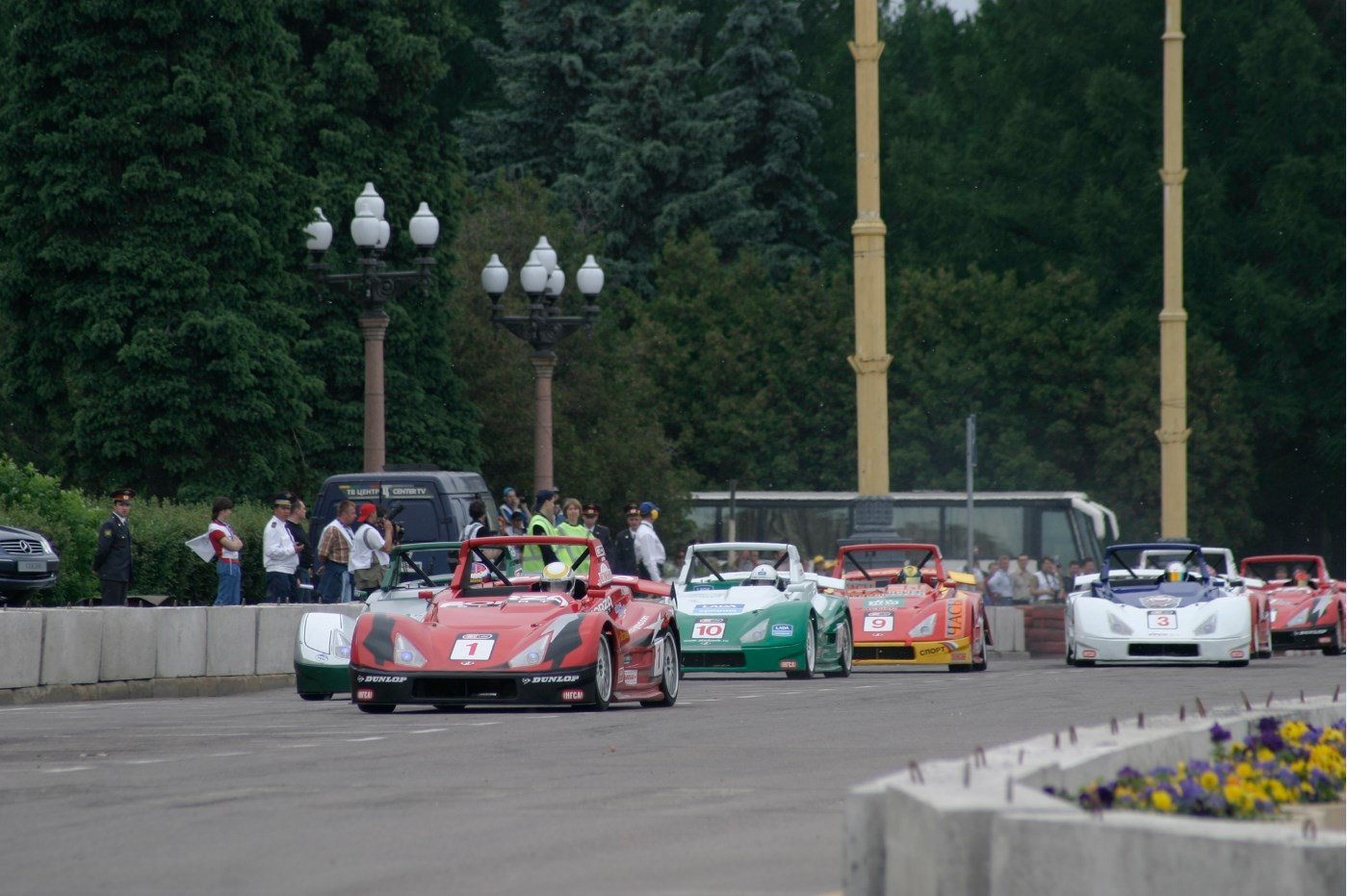
- Lada Revolution Sport and Super-Sports racing
- Category: One Make Series
- Production: at least 48, from 2003 to 2006
- Predecessor: Formula Easter Series
- Successor: None

Technical specifications
- Chassis: Aluminum Tubular Chassis
- Engine: See table (FR layout with a Longitudinal engine)
- Transmission: 5-speed Manual
- Tires: Michelin

Competition history
Entries	Races	Wins	Podiums
at least 840 (20 teams, 2 cars per team, 7 races per series, 3 seasons)	21	21	21
Poles	Titles		
21	3		

The Lada Revolution was a series of Sports Prototypes first presented in 2003 by Russian brand Lada (part of AvtoVAZ).

== History ==
In 2001, Lada would begin the development of the Revolution. The car would share its parts largely with older VAZ cars. In 2003, the first running models were built and would undergo testing by NAMI, at the Nürburgring and Moscow Ring. After undergoing testing, the car would be unveiled at the 2003 Geneva Auto Show. The car would be well received by the public, winning awards at the 2003-2004 Union of Designers of Russia, and other car of the year awards from Russian car magazines. After the 2003 Auto show season was over, Lada would create "National Racing Series LADA" the first national racing history in Russia since Formula Easter. The series would have seven rounds, beginning at Moscow, and ending at St. Petersburg. The series would begin May 14, 2004, at the Moscow Ring. All races in 2004, 2005, and 2006 would go as scheduled, broadcast by Russia-2. In 2007 was cancelled due to financial issues, and would not resume in 2008 because of the 2008 financial crisis. In total at least 48 Revolutions would be built, with 3 being totaled in the racing series.

== Variants ==
The Revolution Sport (Revolution I) was the standard version of the Revolution. This version was equipped was a Naturally aspirated VAZ-21086-29 Inline 4 engine, with a displacement of 1,596 cc (97.4 cu in; 1.6 L). The engine would fit with a cast-iron block, aluminum heads, and a novel 16-valve design. It is stated to develop a maximum of 165 hp (167.3 PS; 123.0 kW) at 7600 rpm and 160 N⋅m (118.0 lb⋅ft) of torque at 6200 rpm and would have a stated Curb weight, with full fluids and no driver, to weigh in at 670 kg (1,477.1 lb). It was said to be able to achieve 0–100 kilometres per hour (0–62 mph) in 7.3 seconds, with a top speed of 240 km/h (149 mph). The car would race from 2004-2005.

The Revolution Super-Sport (Revolution I) was a face-lifted version of the earlier sport. The power out put would be brought to 215 hp (218.0 PS; 160.3 kW) @ 8,500 rpm and 170 N⋅m (125.4 lb⋅ft) @ 5,800 rpm. It was said to be able to achieve 0–100 kilometres per hour (0–62 mph) in 6.5 seconds, with a top speed of 260 km/h (162 mph). The car could also be ordered as a 2 seater, but never would be ordered, and would remain a show car. The car would race from 2005-2006

The Revolution RS2 (Revolution II) for the 2006 season, the aging Revolution I would be heavily facelifted. The Suspension would be overhauled, and the Diffuser and the engine cooling would be completely redesigned, this new model would be renamed RS2. This car would race for just 2006.

The Revolution III was a concept car presented at the 2008 Paris Motor Show. The model was planned for production in 2009, but that would not come to pass because of the 2008 financial crisis. The car was intended to be a road-going variant of the RS2.

Model	Years	Engine	Displacement	Horsepower	Horsepower RPM	Torque	Torque RPM	Length	Width	Height	Wheelbase	Weight	0-60 mph (96.6 km/h)	Top Speed	Image
Revolution Sport	2004-2005	VAZ-21086-29 Inline 4	1,596 cc (97.4 cu in; 1.6 L)	165 hp (167.3 PS; 123.0 kW)	7,600	160 N⋅m (118.0 lb⋅ft)	6,200	3,650 mm (143.7 in)	1,750 mm (68.9 in)	1,200 mm (47.2 in)	2,400 mm (94.5 in)	670 kg (1,477.1 lb)	7.3	240 km/h (149 mph)	
Revolution Super-Sport	2005-2006	VAZ-21086-29 Inline 4 Turbocharged	1,596 cc (97.4 cu in; 1.6 L)	215 hp (218.0 PS; 160.3 kW)	8,500	170 N⋅m (125.4 lb⋅ft)	5,800	3,650 mm (143.7 in)	1,750 mm (68.9 in)	1,200 mm (47.2 in)	2,400 mm (94.5 in)	700 kg (1,543.2 lb)	6.5	260 km/h (162 mph)	
Revolution RS2	2006	VAZ-21086-29 Inline 4 Turbocharged	1,596 cc (97.4 cu in; 1.6 L)	227 hp (230.1 PS; 169.3 kW)	8,500	172 N⋅m (126.9 lb⋅ft)	6,000	3,700 mm (145.7 in)	1,750 mm (68.9 in)	1,100 mm (43.3 in)	2,400 mm (94.5 in)	650 kg (1,433.0 lb)	6.2	260 km/h (162 mph)	
Revolution III	2008	Renault F4R774 Inline 4 Turbocharged	1,998 cc (121.9 cu in; 2.0 L)	245 hp (248.4 PS; 182.7 kW)	6,000	250 N⋅m (184.4 lb⋅ft)	3,400	4,200 mm (165.4 in)	1,750 mm (68.9 in)	1,200 mm (47.2 in)	2,400 mm (94.5 in)	1,150 kg (2,535.3 lb)	5.9	250 km/h (155 mph) (Gearing Limited)	
