= Lada Silhouette =

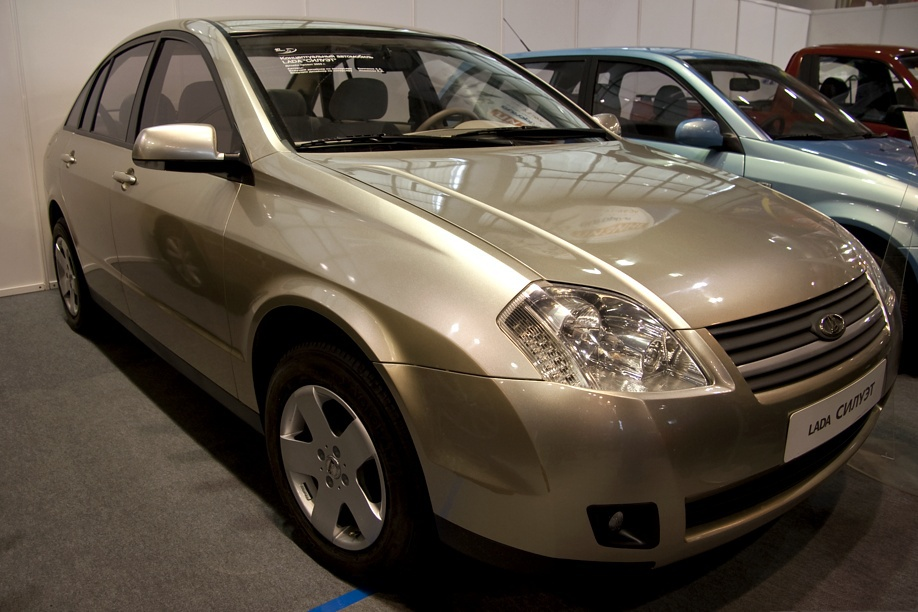
Lada Silhouette 2116

The Lada Silhouette (also known as the Lada 2116) is a family car concept car developed by Russian automaker AvtoVAZ in collaboration with Porsche Engineering (who also had input into earlier VAZ designs such as the Samara (VAZ-2108) and the Lada 110-series) and originally revealed to the public in 2005.

In 2006, the concept was revised and developed and called the project was dubbed Project C, and is known by the official designator VAZ-2116. It was shown to the public at the 2006 Moscow International Motor Show.

Leaked photographs of the a prototype vehicle were originally published in 2008, and early speculation cited a launch date of around 2008 or 2009 but the car never went beyond prototype stage and didn't reach production.
