= Lada =

Russian small car brand

- Product type: Cars
- Current owner: AvtoVAZ
- Country: Russia
- Introduced: 1973; 53 years ago
- Markets: Worldwide
- Website: lada.ru

Lada (Note: According to various sources, the name Lada is derived from a Russian word for Viking longships (Russian: ладья, romanized: lad'ya).) (Russian: Лада [ˈladə], marketed as LADA (Note: From 2004 onwards Lada is marketed worldwide, including in Russia, using the all-capitals brand name written in Latin script.)) is a brand of small cars manufactured by AvtoVAZ (originally VAZ), a state-owned company in Russia. From January 2021 until May 2022, Lada was integrated with then-sister brand Dacia into Renault's Lada-Dacia business unit.

The first cars manufactured by AvtoVAZ were produced with technical assistance from Fiat and marketed under the Zhiguli designation. The Lada brand appeared in 1973, initially being overseas-focused before becoming AvtoVAZ's main brand for all markets in the 1990s. Renault took control of the brand in 2016. Technical assistance from the French company started in 2008, after it acquired a minority AvtoVAZ stake. Lada was re-acquired by the Russian government in 2022.

Outside of the Eastern Bloc, Ladas were aimed squarely at the budget end of the market, where they were often as little as half the price of contemporary Western vehicles of the period. Lada vehicles are positioned as affordable and offering good value for money.

To this day, Lada remains by far the best-selling car in the Russian market.

== History ==
=== Soviet era ===
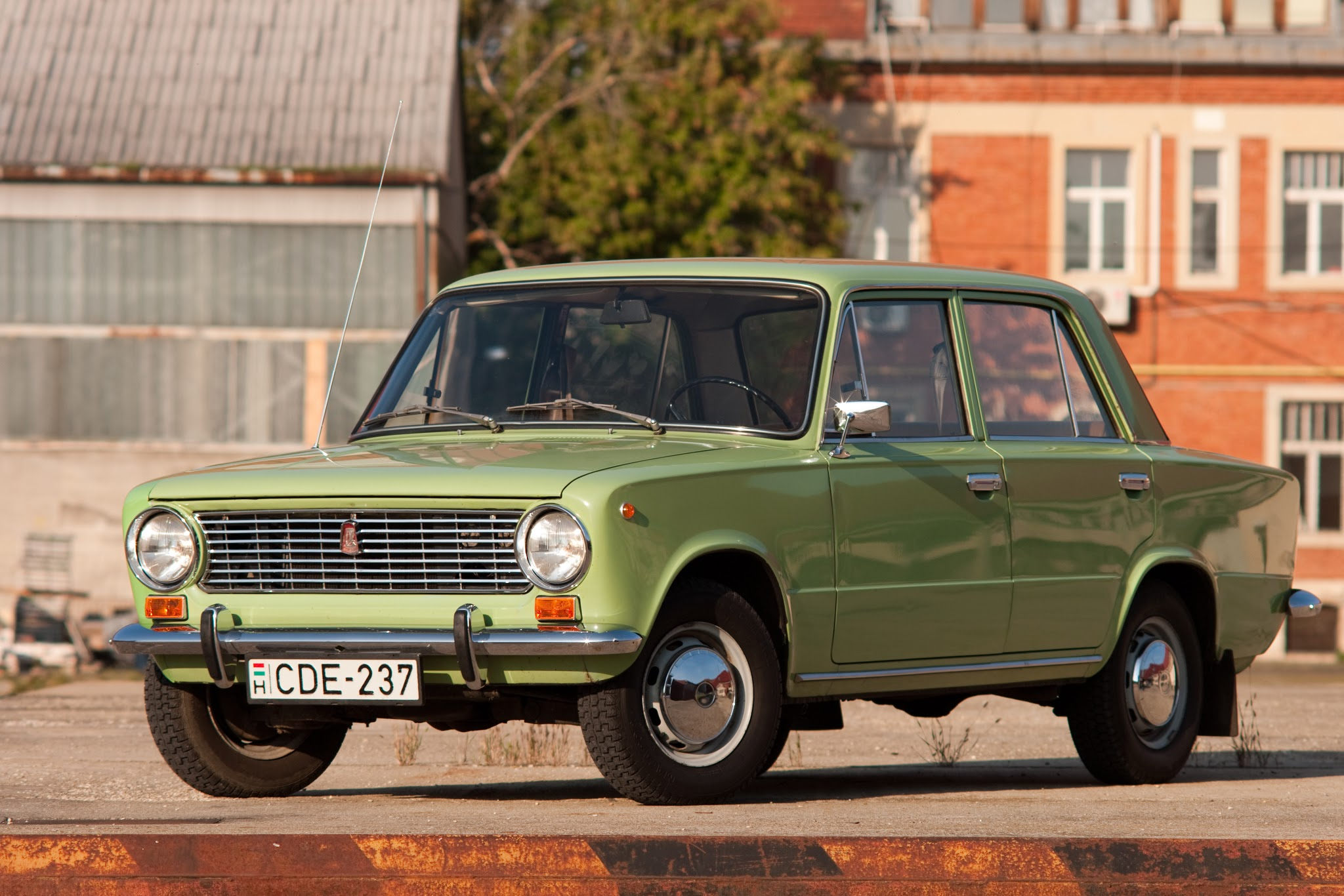
The first Lada, the VAZ-2101, was introduced in 1970

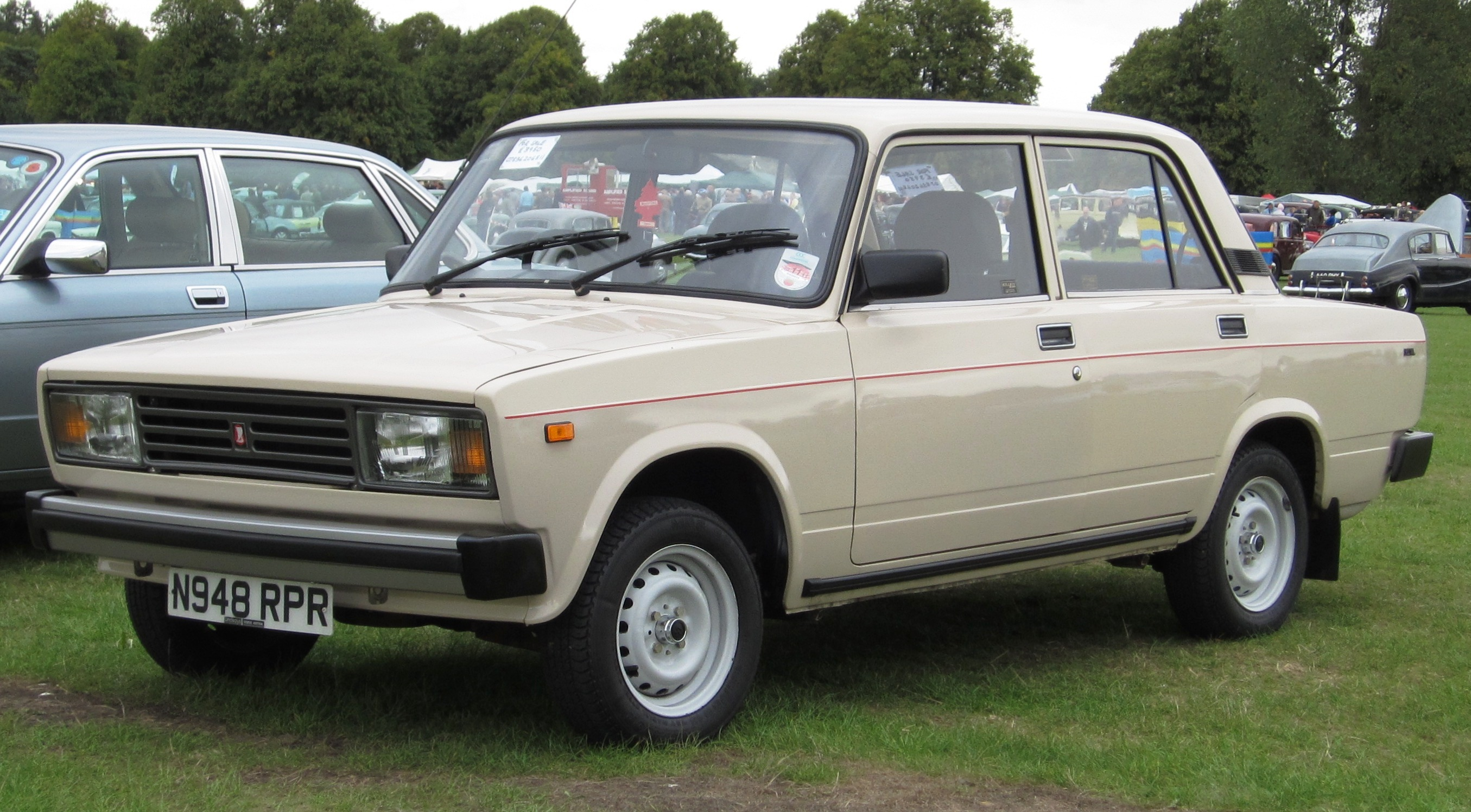
Over two million VAZ-2105s were produced from 1980 to 2010.

Automaker AvtoVAZ was formed from a collaboration between Fiat and the Soviet Vneshtorg (Department of Foreign Trade), and is based in the city of Tolyatti on the Volga River. Both sides discussed the proposal in Moscow, where Gianni Agnelli, company owner and nephew of the founder of Fiat, and Vittorio Valletta, the president of the company, had arrived from Italy. The first preliminary agreement was signed on 1 July 1965. On 4 May 1966, the Soviet minister of the automotive industry Alexander Tarasov and Vittorio Valletta put their signatures on a protocol on the scientific and technical cooperation between Fiat and the Soviet ministry. Eventually, a general agreement between the two sides was signed in Moscow on 15 August 1966. Fiat's subsidiary Comau supplied many of the automation systems in the plant.

The company began producing the VAZ-2101 in 1970, which was a more rugged version of the Fiat 124 sedan. The car was given heavier steel body panels and strengthened components, which improved reliability on bumpy roads and in the harsh winters of the Soviet Union.

The first cars manufactured by AvtoVAZ with technical assistance from Fiat were marketed under the Zhiguli designation, allegedly chosen after it was suggested by designer, A. M. Cherny. When the cars began to be exported on foreign markets, the Zhiguli designation was found to be inappropriate, as it was hard to pronounce for non-Russian speakers, and it was said to resemble the word gigolo too closely. Lada became the brand for export markets. Due to the scarcity of auto-repair shops in the Soviet Union, Ladas were designed to be easily maintained by their owners. The rugged Lada was popular in Europe, Canada, and South America for customers looking for more affordable alternatives to local brands, and sales of the new cars were extremely successful, reaching as far as New Zealand. In the West, their construction was frequently described as cheap, and that inspired jokes at the car's expense; nonetheless, Lada "gained a reputation as a maker of solid, unpretentious, and reliable cars for motorists who wanted to drive on a budget." The Lada brand appeared in 1973, and it has since become the main brand for AvtoVAZ vehicles.

Since the original Fiat engine did not have any space for modernization, it was replaced with a new overhead camshaft engine. The car was equipped with rugged drum brakes on the rear, as the latter proved to be more reliable on poor roads. More reliable and up-to-date front and rear suspension with increased ground clearance, a modernized transmission, and recessed door handles were also fitted. The work on the new car was conducted by joint groups of NAMI and Fiat engineers, who worked together in Turin and Tolyatti. By the spring of 1970, AvtoVAZ had formed its own team of designers and engineers and worked independently.

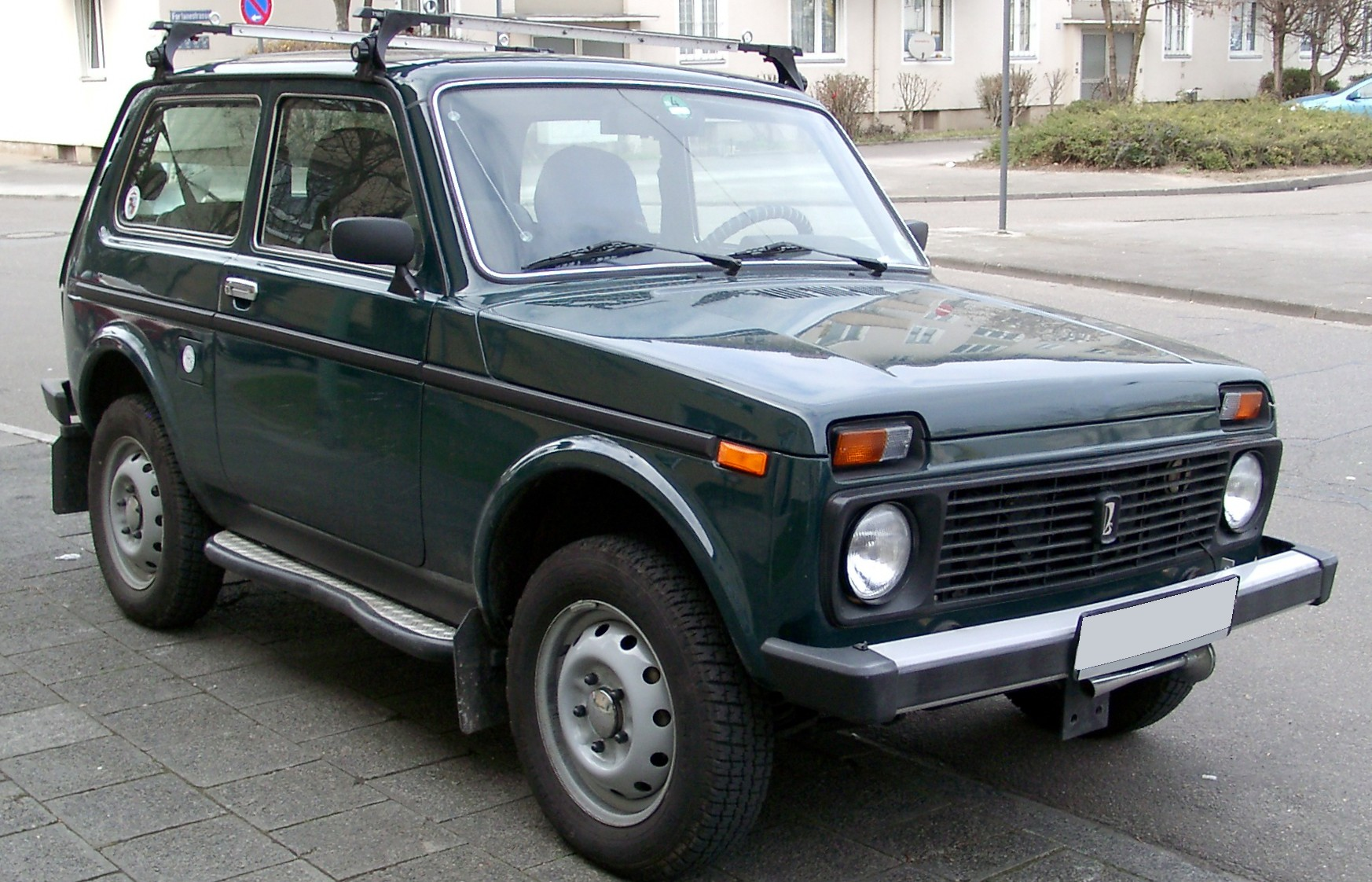
Lada Niva

After having built several prototypes and experimental vehicles, AvtoVAZ designers launched the first car entirely of their design, the VAZ-2121 Niva, in 1977.

=== Post-Soviet era ===
The 110-series sedan was introduced in 1995, two years after its original 1993 deadline. Development costs for the car were estimated at $2 billion. The 2111 station wagon followed in 1998 and the 2112 hatchback completed the range in 2001. A five-door version of the Niva, the VAZ-2131, was introduced in 1995. However, by 1997, Lada was forced to withdraw from most Western European markets due to tightening emission and safety legislation. Also, the rapid rise of Pacific Rim marques such as Hyundai, Kia, and Proton in the 1990s began to take over the budget sector of the market, in which Lada had survived since the 1970s, which also contributed to the marque's eventual demise in the West.

The VAZ-2120 Nadezhda, a minivan based on the Lada Niva, was introduced in 1998. In the second half of the 1990s, efforts were made to improve build quality, but in 1999, nearly 50,000 instances occurred of cars being assembled with missing parts.

The introduction of the new Kalina B-segment lineup to the market occurred in 2005. AutoVAZ built a new, modern plant for this model, hoping to sell some 200,000 cars annually. The Kalina had been originally designed in the early 1990s, and its launch was repeatedly delayed, exemplifying the company's difficulty in bringing products to market in time. In March 2007, Lada launched the Priora, a restyled and modernised 110-series model.

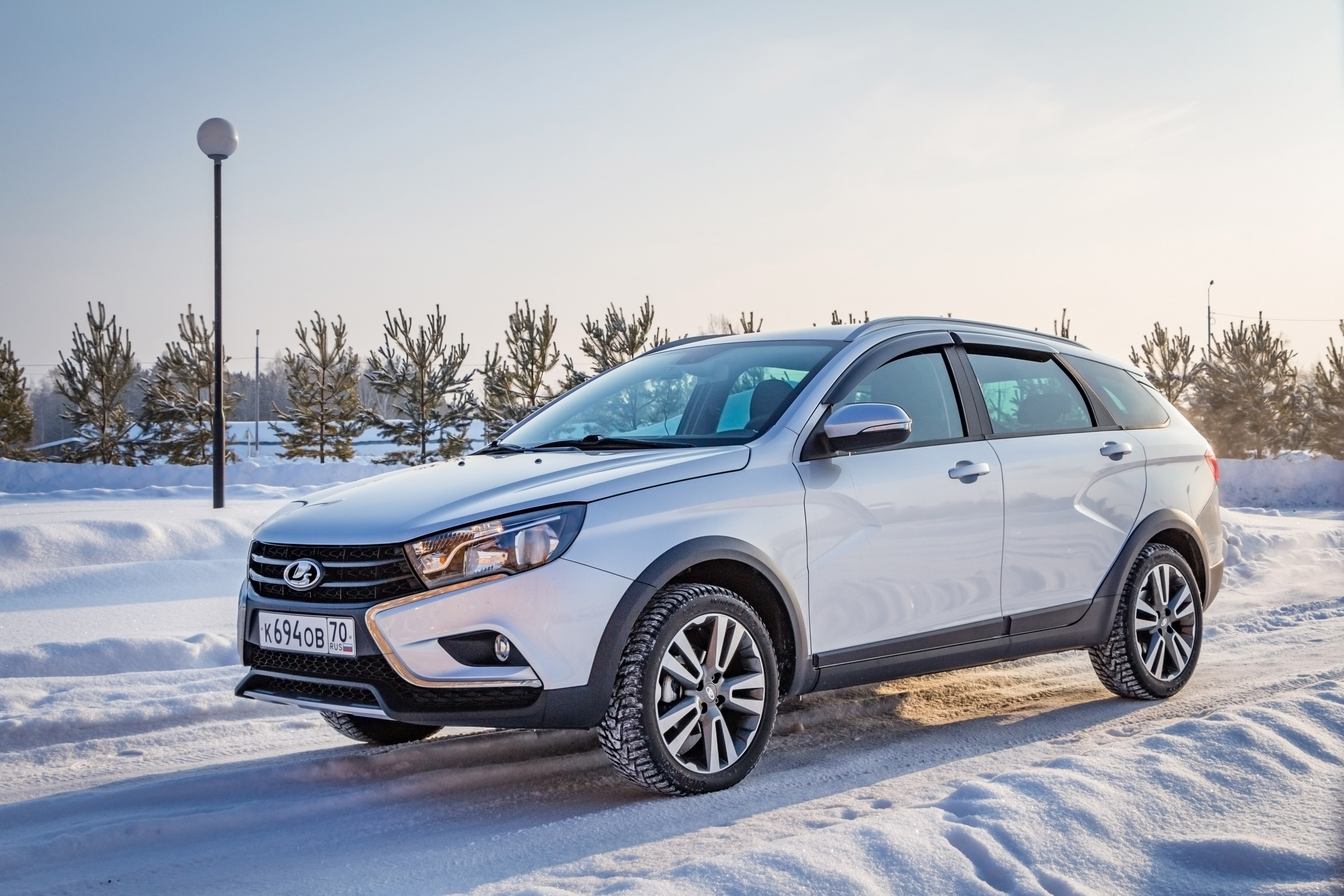
Lada Vesta

In March 2008, Renault purchased a minority 25% stake in AvtoVAZ in a US$1 billion deal, with Rostec retaining the remaining 75%. Sales of the Granta, a subcompact car developed in collaboration with Renault, started in December 2011. The Largus, another vehicle with Renault technology, was launched in the Russian market by the middle of July 2012. In August 2012, the XRAY concept car was launched at the Moscow International Automobile Salon. The XRAY was designed by then-chief designer Steve Mattin, formerly of Volvo and Mercedes-Benz. The second generation of the Lada Kalina, basically a facelifted first generation, was also revealed at the 2012 Moscow International Motor Show. The Kalina is also produced as the more powerful version named Lada Kalina Sport. Production of the Vesta, based on a new B\C platform developed by AvtoVAZ in cooperation with the Renault-Nissan Alliance, started on 25 September 2015, at Lada Izhevsk manufacturing site. For the first time in Lada history, only a year had passed between the concept car and the start of production. In 2016, after various acquisitions, Renault became the parent company of AvtoVAZ and took control of Lada. The XRAY, based on a Dacia platform, was the first compact city crossover in the company's history. Sales started on 14 February 2016. In January 2021, after a company revamp, Renault said it would integrate Lada and sister brand Dacia into a Lada-Dacia business unit.

In May 2022, due to the ongoing Russian invasion of Ukraine, Renault sold its controlling stake to a state-owned entity, NAMI, for one symbolic Ruble. The deal, however, included various opportunities within a six year window for Renault to buy back its assets. Following the sale, production of all the more modern (with many overseas components) models ceased. After three months of no car production, Lada's parent, AvtoVAZ, resumed production of older models such as the Niva and a simplified version of the Granta. More advanced models were not able to be produced due to strict sanctions imposed on Russia due to the invasion. In April 2023, Lada announced that a locally modified version of the Vesta (Vesta NG) was ready for mass assembly.

Business Insider reported that as a result of international sanctions imposed following the 2022 Russian invasion of Ukraine, Lada switched to producing Granta models with no airbags, similar to new cars in Latin America, including the Kia Rio, Kia Picanto, Hyundai Grand i10, Mazda 2, Chevrolet Spark and the Chevrolet Onix, as neither the frontal airbag nor anti-lock braking systems (ABS) in new cars are compulsory in many Latin American countries.

== Branding ==
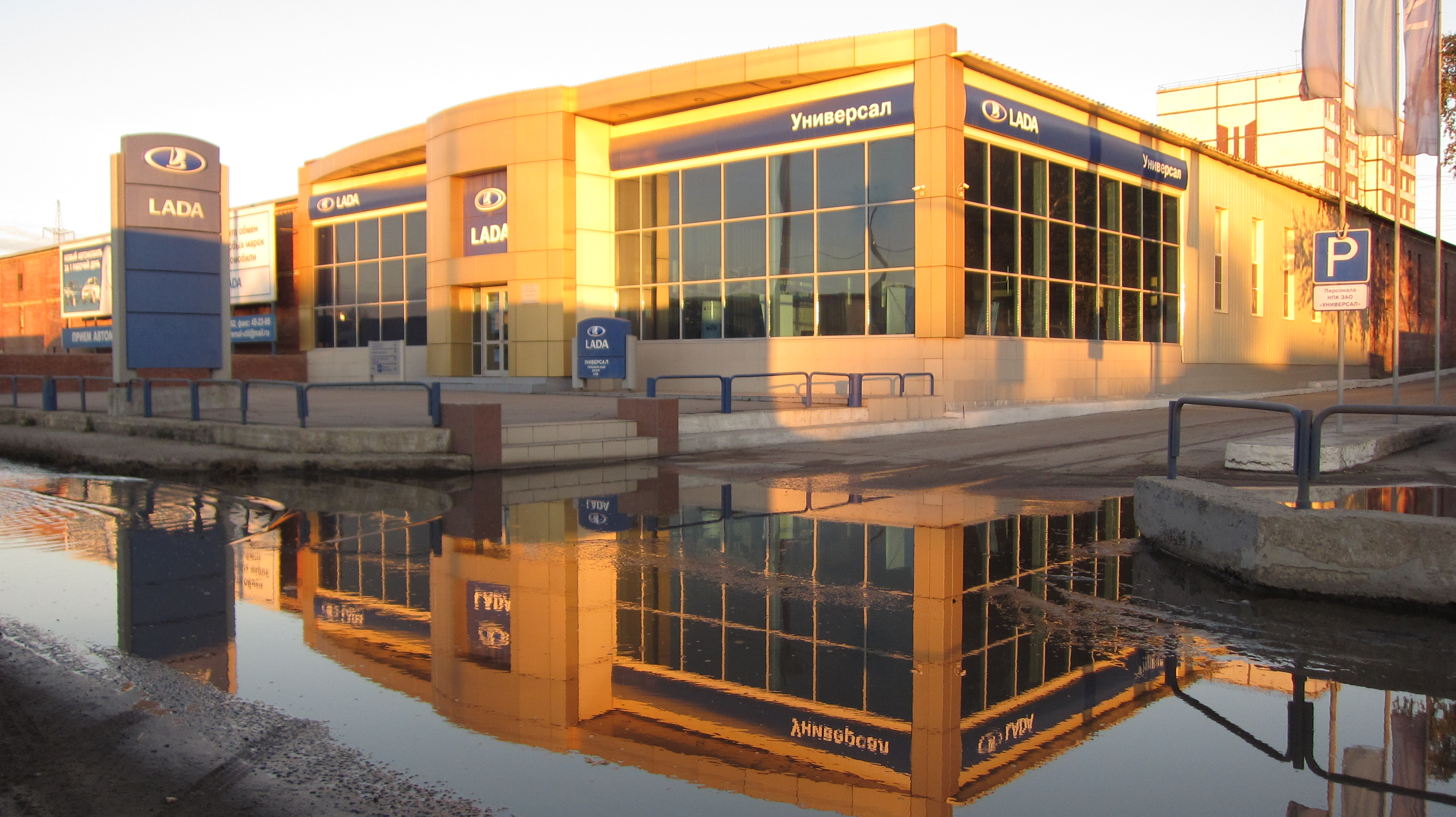
Lada brand store in Tolyatti, Russia

The first official logo for AvtoVAZ was introduced in 1970. It was used by all its products irrespective of under which name they were marketed. This logo consisted of an upright, shield-like badge with a stylized Viking boat inside. In the mid-1990s, the company introduced a new logo, this time with a horizontal ellipse-like layout, still keeping the boat inside it. The logo design was maintained while being updated in 2002 and 2015.

In 2004, AvtoVAZ officially ended the use of multiple designations for the Russian market, unifying from then on, all its products under the Lada brand. It also established the use of the Latin script in that market to write both the Lada name and its model nameplates on cars, as well as marketing and documentation material.

== Present models ==
- Granta
1. Granta sedan
2. Granta Sportline
3. Granta liftback
4. Granta Cross
5. Granta Sport
- Vesta
1. Vesta sedan
2. Vesta Cross
3. Vesta SW
4. Vesta SW Cross
5. Vesta Sportline
6. Vesta SW Cross Black Limited Edition
7. Vesta NG
- Largus
1. Largus Universal
2. Largus Universal CNG
3. Largus Cross
4. Largus Cross CNG
5. Largus Wagon
6. Largus Wagon CNG
- Niva
1. Niva Travel - former GM Niva variant
2. Niva Legend - the original Lada Niva
- Iskra
1. Iskra sedan
2. Iskra SW
3. Iskra SW Cross
- Azimut

== See also ==
- Automobile model numbering system in USSR and Russia
- List of AvtoVAZ vehicles
- AvtoVAZ vehicles in international markets
