= Lada Nadezhda =

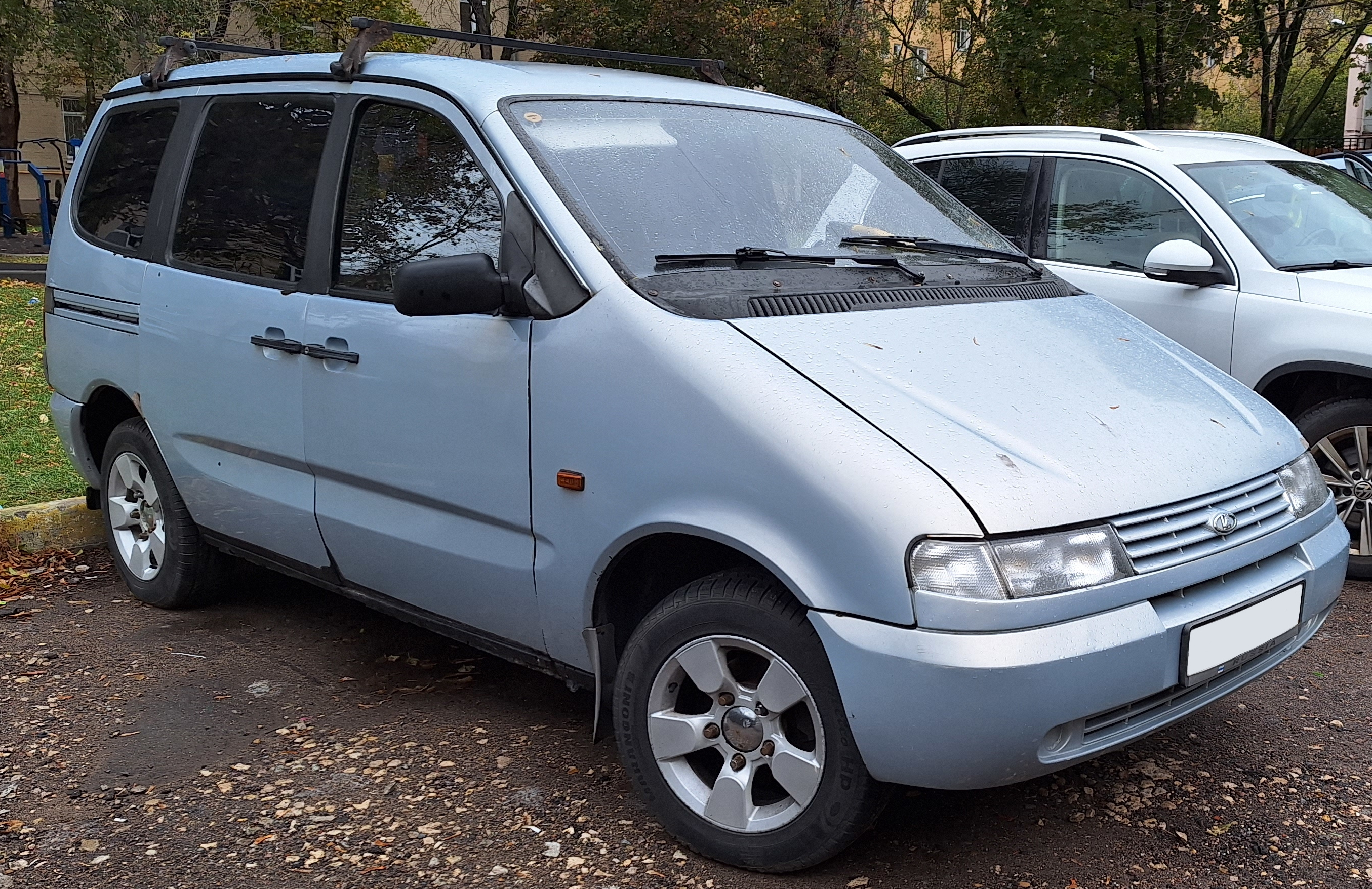
- VAZ 2120

Overview
- Manufacturer: OPP (AvtoVAZ)
- Also called: VAZ 2120
- Production: 1998–2006
- Assembly: Russia: Tolyatti

Body and chassis
- Class: Minivan
- Body style: 5-door minivan
- Layout: Front engine, four-wheel drive
- Related: Lada Niva; Lada Niva Travel

Powertrain
- Engine: 1.7 L and 1.8 L I4
- Transmission: 5-speed manual

Dimensions
- Wheelbase: 2,700 mm (106.3 in)
- Length: 4,290 mm (168.9 in)
- Width: 1,770 mm (69.7 in)
- Height: 1,690 mm (66.5 in)
- Curb weight: 1,400 kg (3,086 lb)

The Lada Nadezhda or VAZ-2120 "Nadezhda" (Ru:Лада Надежда, "Hope"; also a Slavic female name) is a seven-person four-wheel-drive minivan, produced by the Russian automaker AvtoVAZ between 1998 and 2006.

== Overview ==
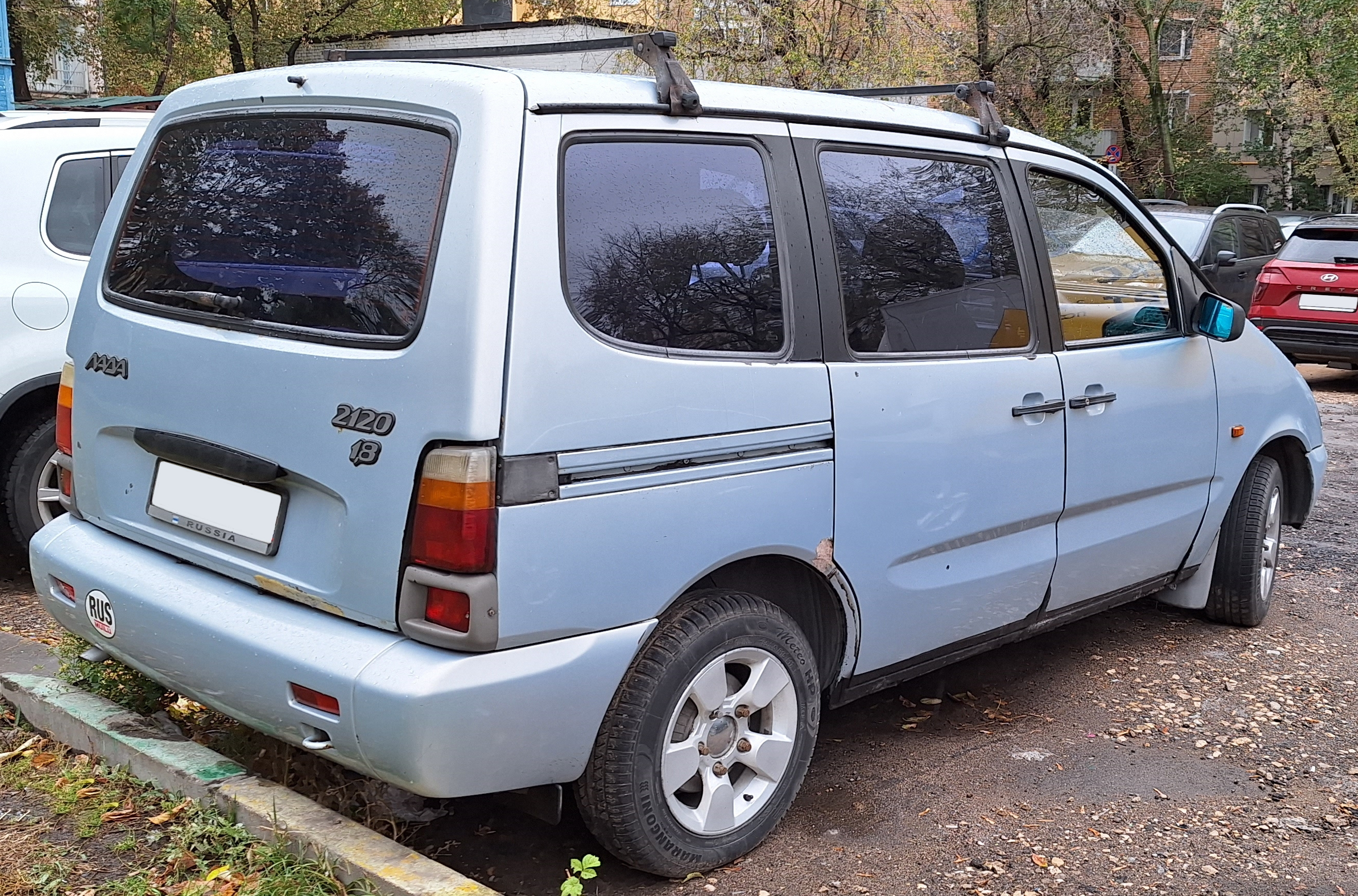
VAZ 2120 (rear view)

The VAZ-2120 was the first minivan produced by the Russian auto industry and was based on the VAZ-2131 Niva line of sport utility vehicles. It was first shown to the public at the 1997 Moscow Auto Show. Built in small numbers, it could not be sold at a competitive price and did not meet with commercial success. Annual production maxed out at around 1,500 units, with a total of about 8,000 examples having been built before it was cancelled in August 2006. Plans to build the Nadezhda on a dedicated, rear-wheel drive chassis came to naught.

AvtoVAZ' OPP (ОПП) Pilot Industrial Production subsidiary, located in Tolyatti, produced the Nadezhda to order. The Nadezhda was discontinued as VAZ preferred to use the production capacity to build the 112 Coupé, which could be sold at a higher profit margin.

== Design ==
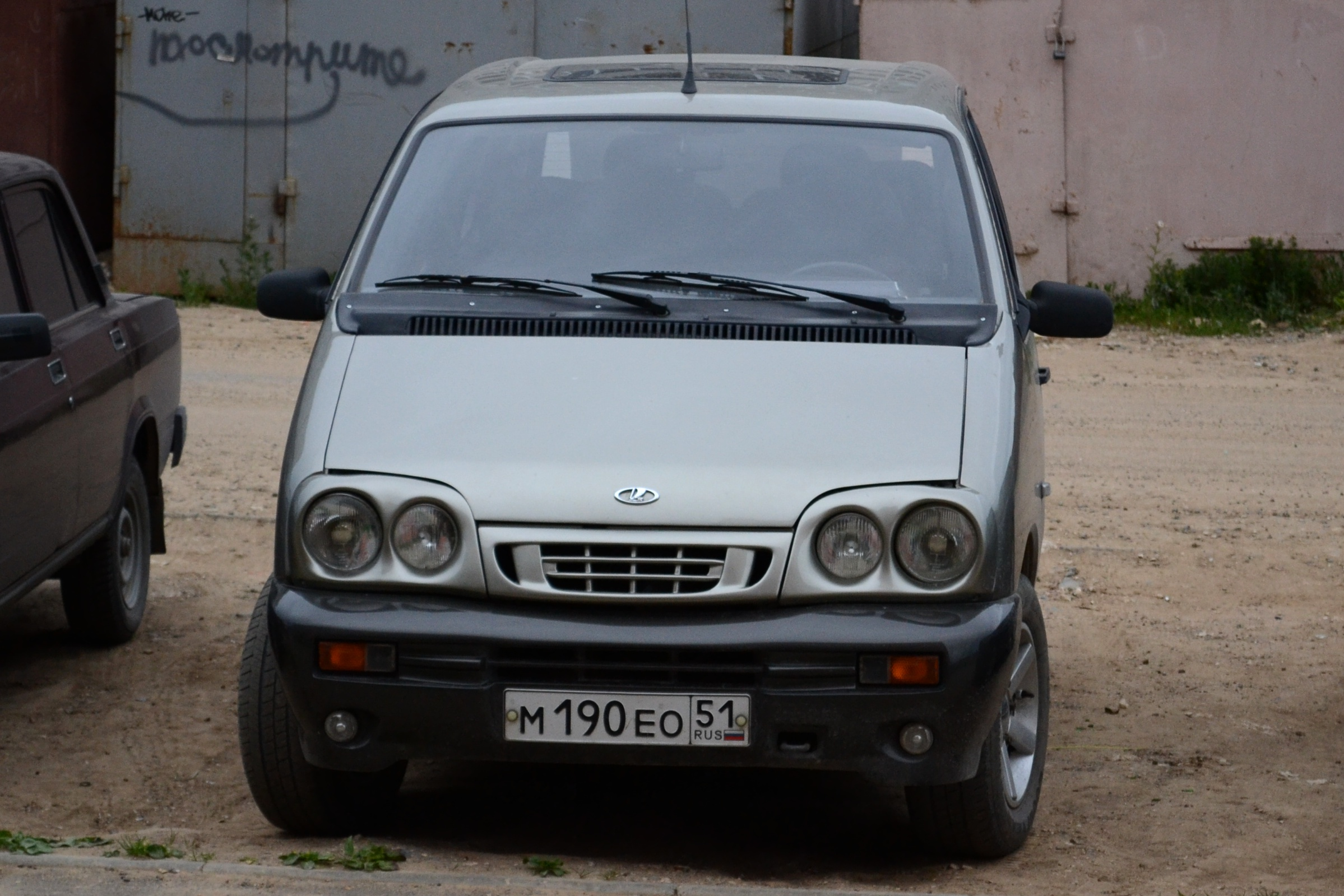
Pre-production VAZ 2120 with VAZ-2106 headlights

The pre-production examples used the twin round headlamps of the VAZ-2106, set in organically shaped housings. These were unable to meet newer legislation and on the production models, the headlamps from the Lada 110 were used.

=== Engines ===
- VAZ-2120 1.8, with carburetor engine VAZ-2130 (1.8 liter, 80 PS)
- VAZ-2120 1.7i, VAZ-21214 engine with fuel injection (1.7 liters, 84 PS)

== Variants ==
- "Van" ("Utiliter") - commercial retail delivery van
- "Pick-up" - commercial retail delivery truck
- "Service" - mobile workshop
- "Manager" - "office on wheels"
- "Taxi" - 4-seater with a large luggage compartment
- 2120M 4×2 - restyled, rear-drive version with the rear axle derived from the Izh Oda and regularly hinged rear side door (did not enter series production)
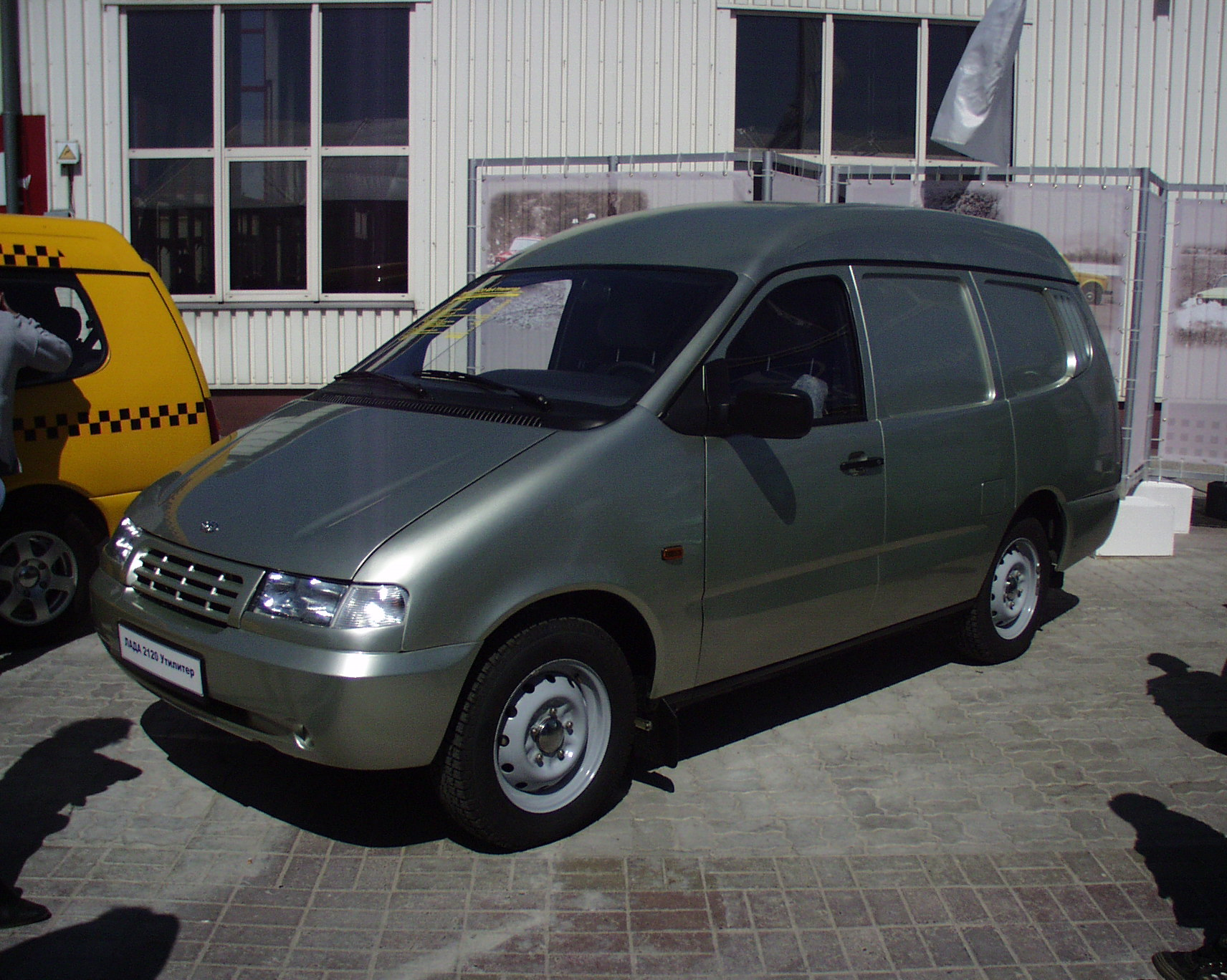
VAZ 2120 Utiliter

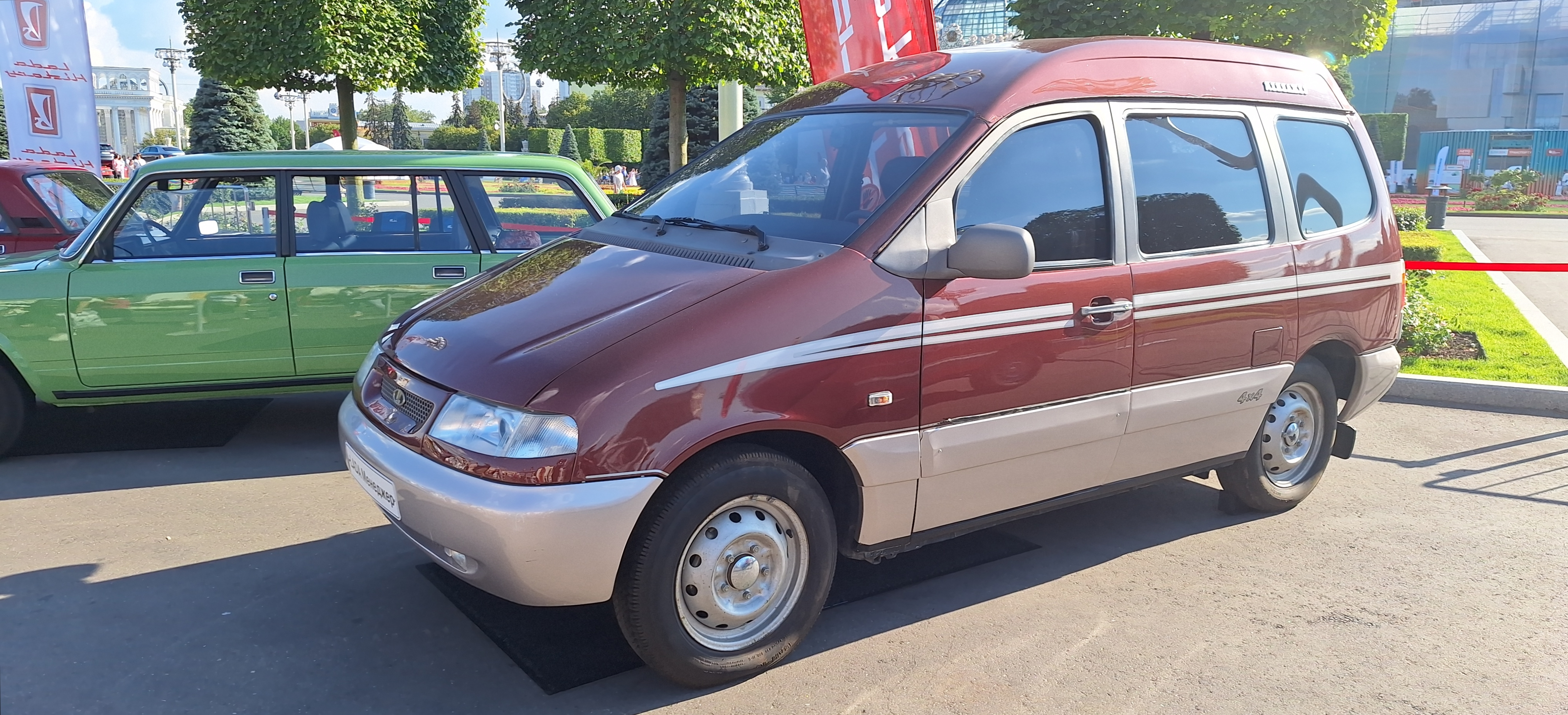
VAZ 2120 Manager

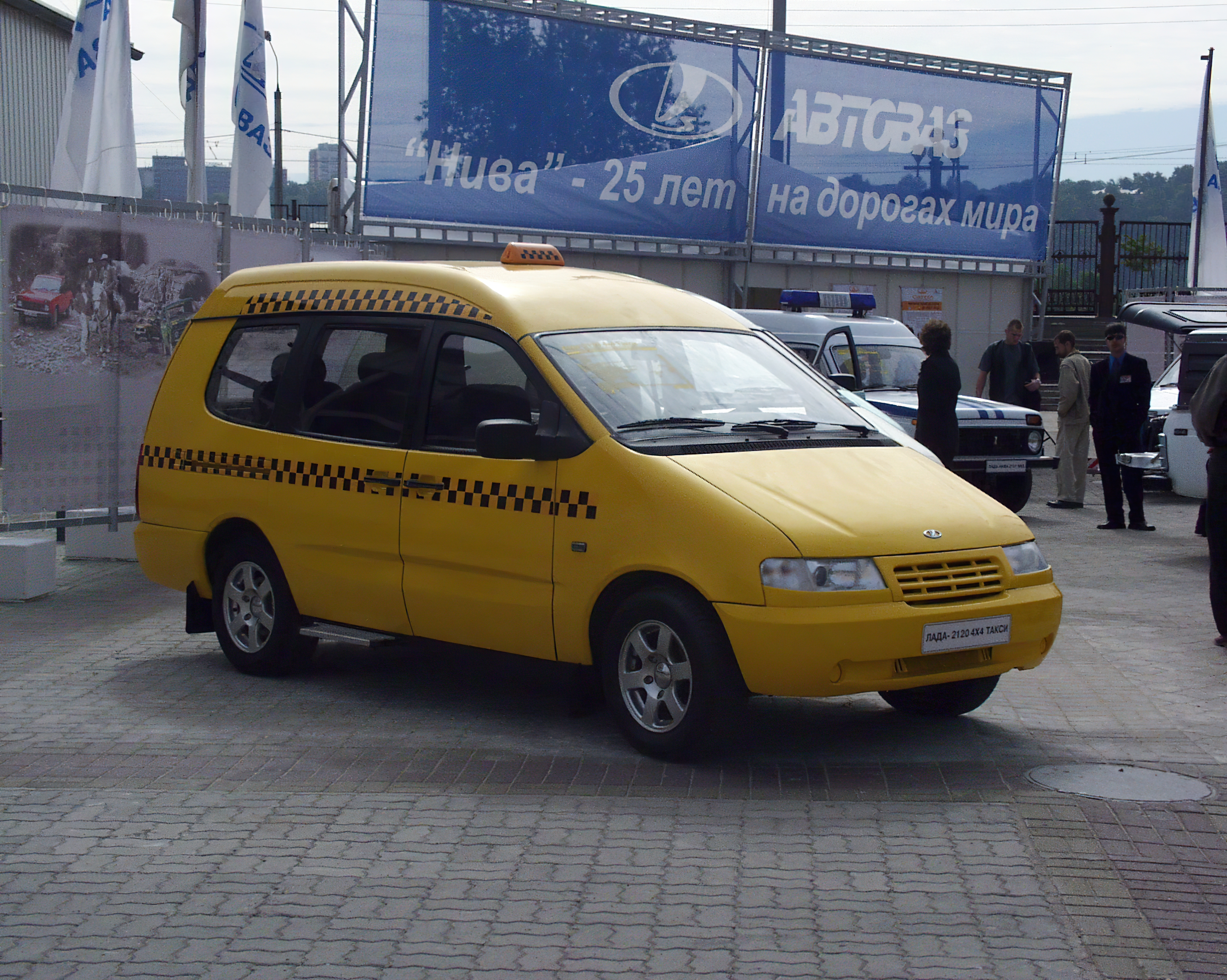
VAZ 2120 Taxi

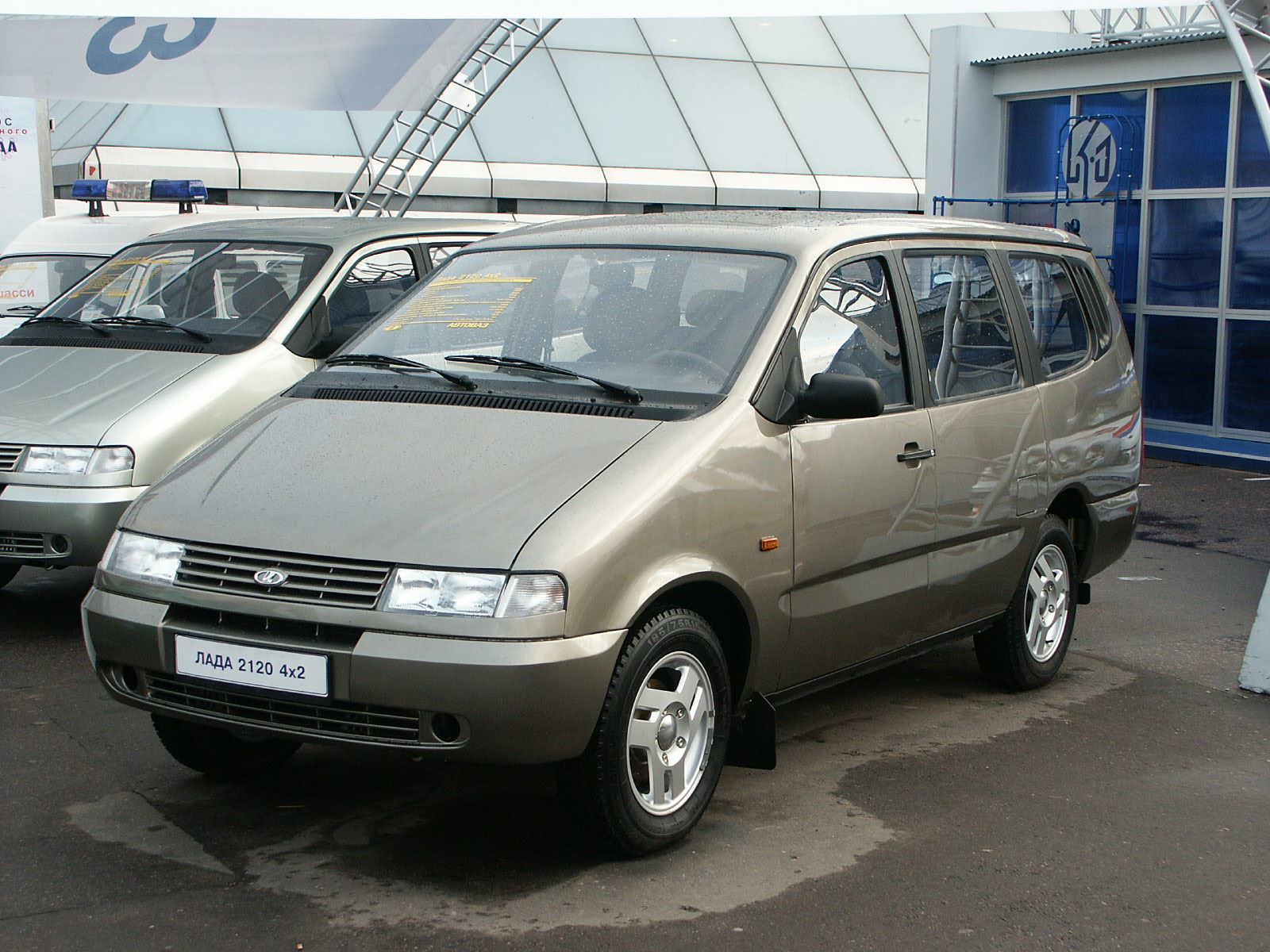
Lada 2120M 4x2
