= Lada 110 =

Russian compact car

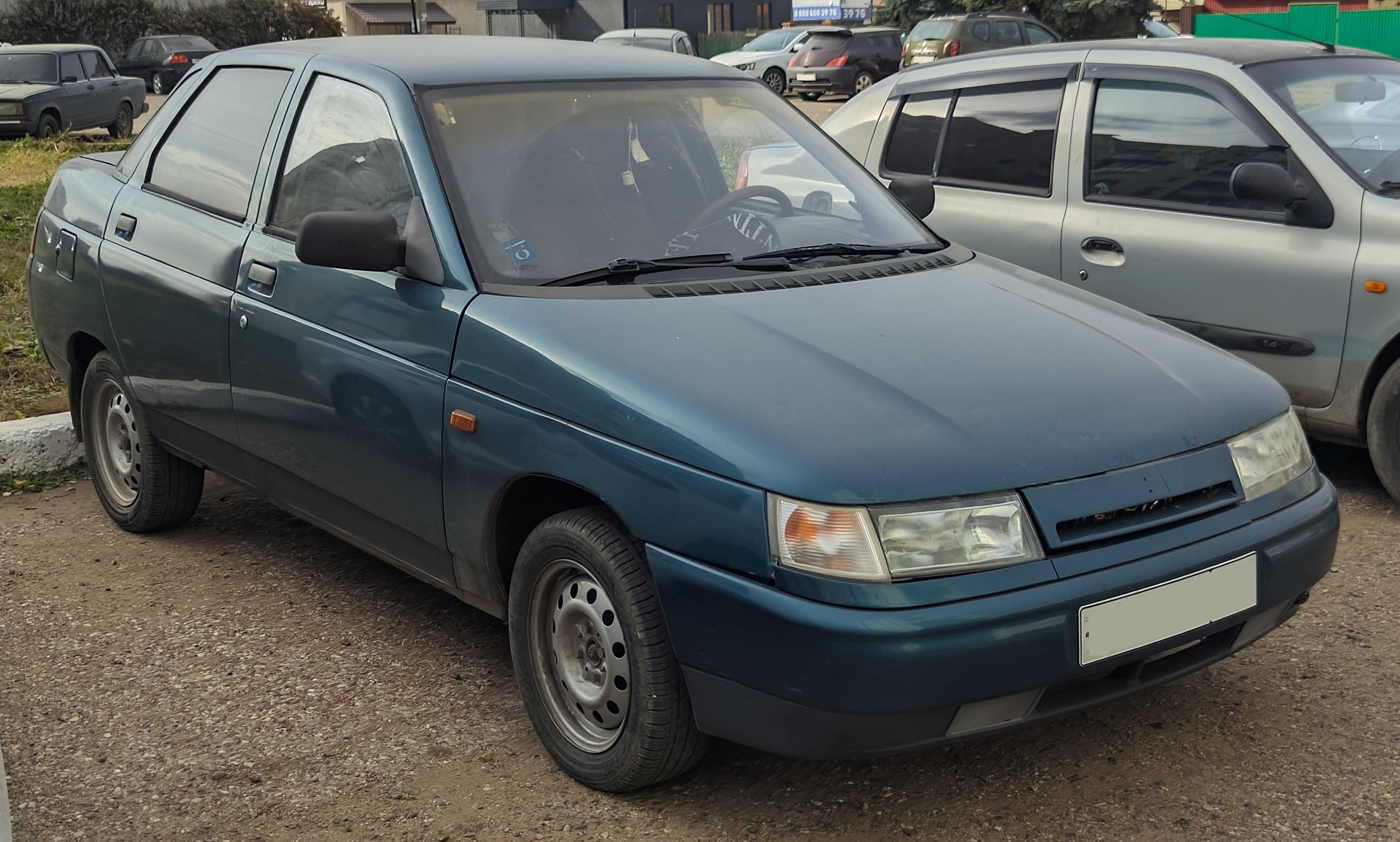

Overview
- Manufacturer: Lada (AvtoVAZ)
- Also called: VAZ-2110; Bogdan 2110 (Ukraine); Lada Aquarius (Venezuela); Lada Dinastía (Ecuador); Lada LUX 110 Dunarea (Romania); Lada Vega (Turkey); Lada Libra / Aquarius (Greece)
- Production: Russia: 1995–2007: 2110 (L); 1997–2008: 2111 (SW) & 2112 (HB); 1999–2009: 21123 (C); Egypt: 2005–2015: 2110 (L)
- Assembly: Russia: Tolyatti (AvtoVAZ & Super-Avto); Egypt: 6th of October City (Alamal Group); Romania: Bucharest (Dunarea); Ukraine: Cherkasy (Bogdan); Ukraine: Kremenchuk (Kremenchuk Car Assembly)

Body and chassis
- Class: Compact car (C)
- Body style: 4-door saloon
- Layout: FF layout
- Related: Lada 111; Lada 112; Lada Priora

Chronology
- Predecessor: VAZ-2108
- Successor: Lada Priora

The Lada 110 or VAZ-2110 is a compact car built by the Russian automaker AvtoVAZ from 1995 to 2009. It spawned two close derivatives: the Lada 111 estate and the Lada 112 hatchback.

The Lada 110 and its variants were replaced in 2007 by the Lada Priora; which was a largely restyled and modernised version of the Lada 110.

== History ==
The prototype of the Lada 110, known as the 300 series, was created in 1987 and optimized for aerodynamics in Zuffenhausen, Germany, in cooperation between AvtoVAZ and Porsche engineers. The first photos of the new compact car were published in the popular monthly magazine Za Rulem in November 1990, and the car itself was demonstrated at the AvtoVAZ Tolyatti factory in 1991. Serial production was planned to start in the following year, but an economic crisis stalled the project and the first cars did not roll off the assembly line until June 27, 1995. The Lada 110 featured a 1.6 litre engine producing approximately 90 hp (67 kW). Production began with 8-valve engines; a 16 valve engine was offered later. Overall, the car weighed around 1050 kilograms (2315 lb). It had electric windows, trip computer, power steering, and galvanized body panels. Fuel-injected models were equipped with electronic engine management system. In early 2006, new taillights and a new dashboard were introduced.

The car was very successful in the domestic Russian market. It is still popular among taxi drivers in the Southern Federal District for the price-quality ratio.

In 2007, the Lada 110 family was restyled and modernised, and relaunched as the Lada Priora.

== Trim levels ==
There were three trim levels: Standard, Normal, and Luxe.

The Standard trim level included a clock, heated rear windows, power door locks, power trunk lock, onboard control system, immobilizer, body-color bumpers, tweed door and seat trims, and front head restraints. The Normal featured powered windows, exterior mirrors with antidazzle effect, velour seat and door upholstery, and rear head restraints. The Luxe added heated front seats, trip computer, fog lights, electric and heated outside mirrors, velvet seat and door upholstery, a trunk spoiler with integral brake lights, and tinted windows.

The model has been a favorite target for styling, both artisanal and professional, especially the version with the five-door hatchback body (Lada-112). Various companies from Tolyatti also designed and offered different body kits: APAL company produced components for the Lada BIS 110 and 111, as did Tornado, Katran, and Grossmeyster; AKS company of Kurage, Autostyle company of Tomcat, and Motorica did so for the Lada 110M (which was included in the official catalogue of AvtoVAZ and considered a restyled version of the original car), Pit-Stop produced the Grand Rally and Rally Sport versions, and Arsenal-Auto built the Sprint. Super-Avto developed a version with a motor of 1.8 liters of its own design and an elongated version of the sedan VAZ-21108 Premier; it was included in the official catalogues of AvtoVAZ. The Motorica company produced the sporting VAZ-21106 version with a 135 PS (99 kW) Opel engine, altered rear wings, and extended wheel arches. Enterprise, together with AvtoVAZ, produced the Consul in 1999–2006, along with the four-wheel drive Tarzan-2 built on the basis of the station wagon Lada 111, with a raised body placed on a separate frame.

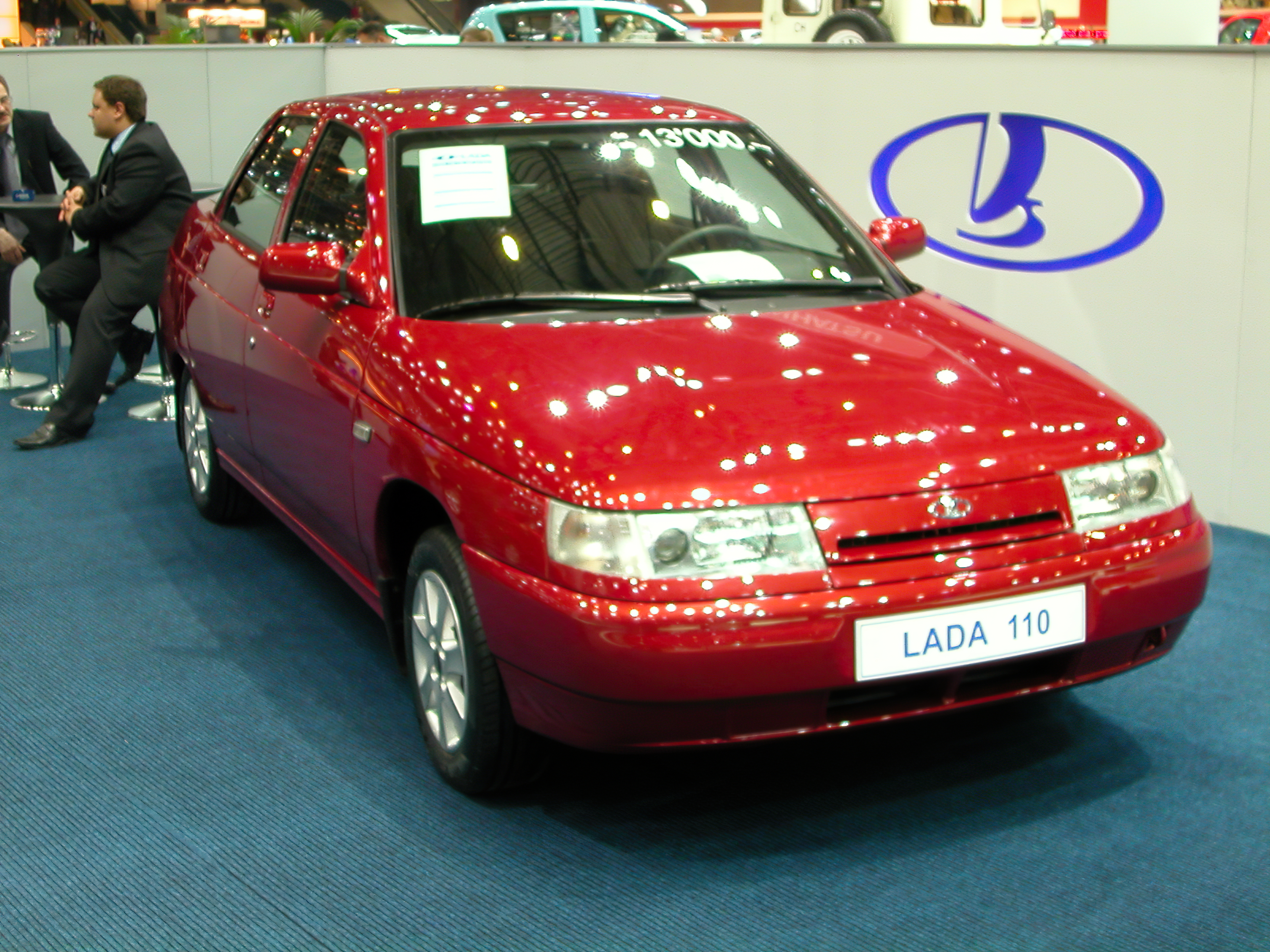
Pre-facelifted VAZ-2110 at the 2005 Geneva Motor Show

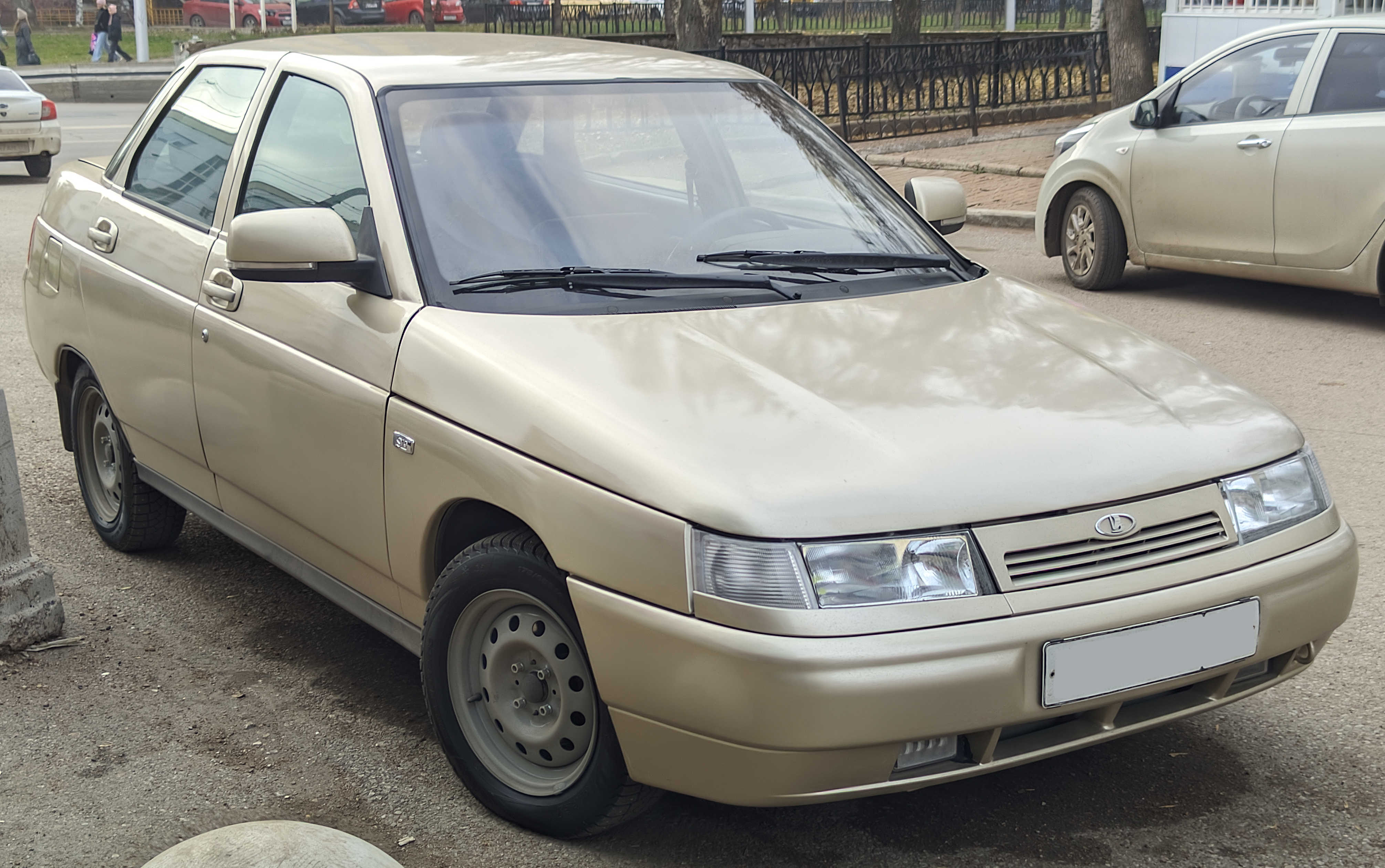
Lada 110 (facelift)

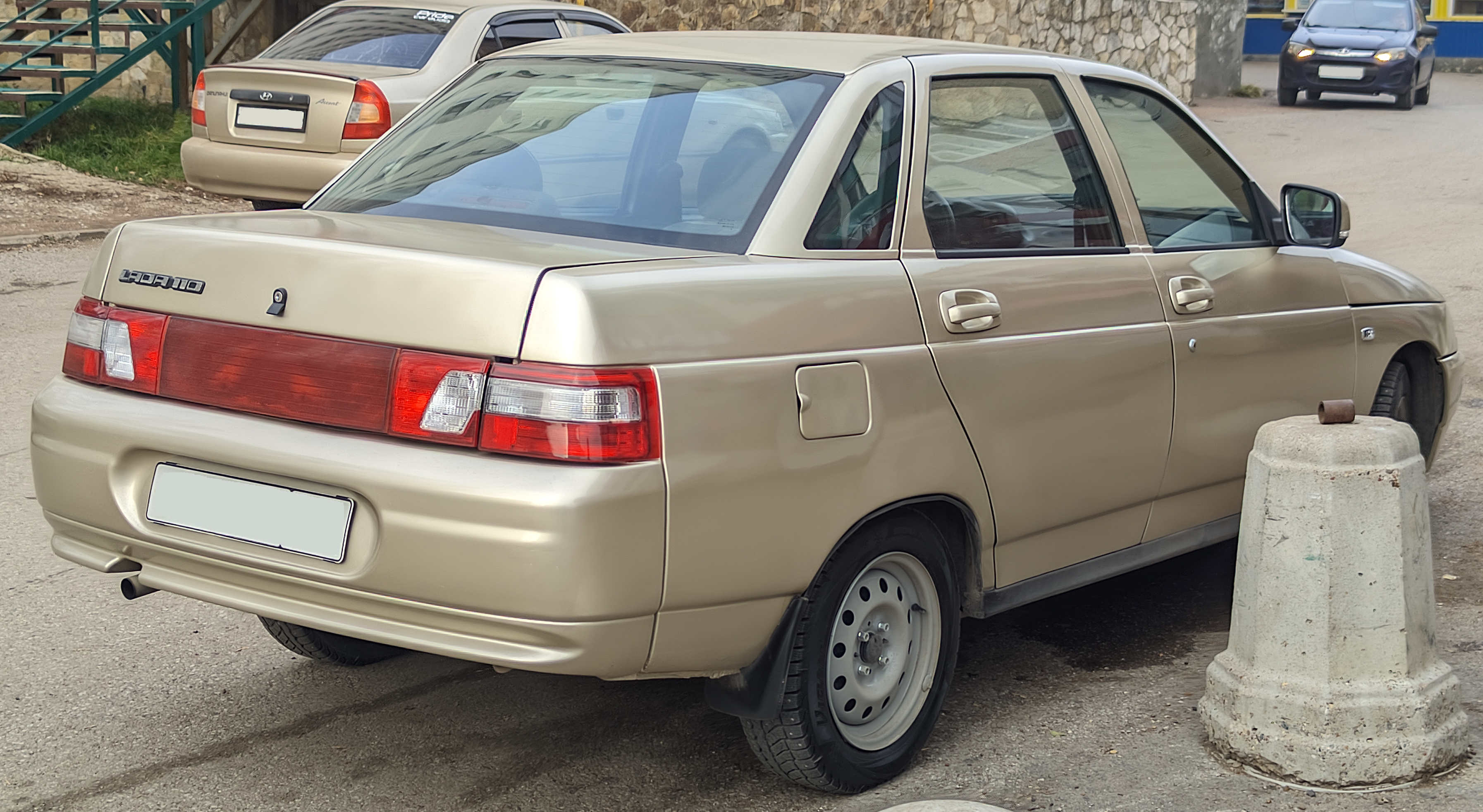
Rear view (facelift)

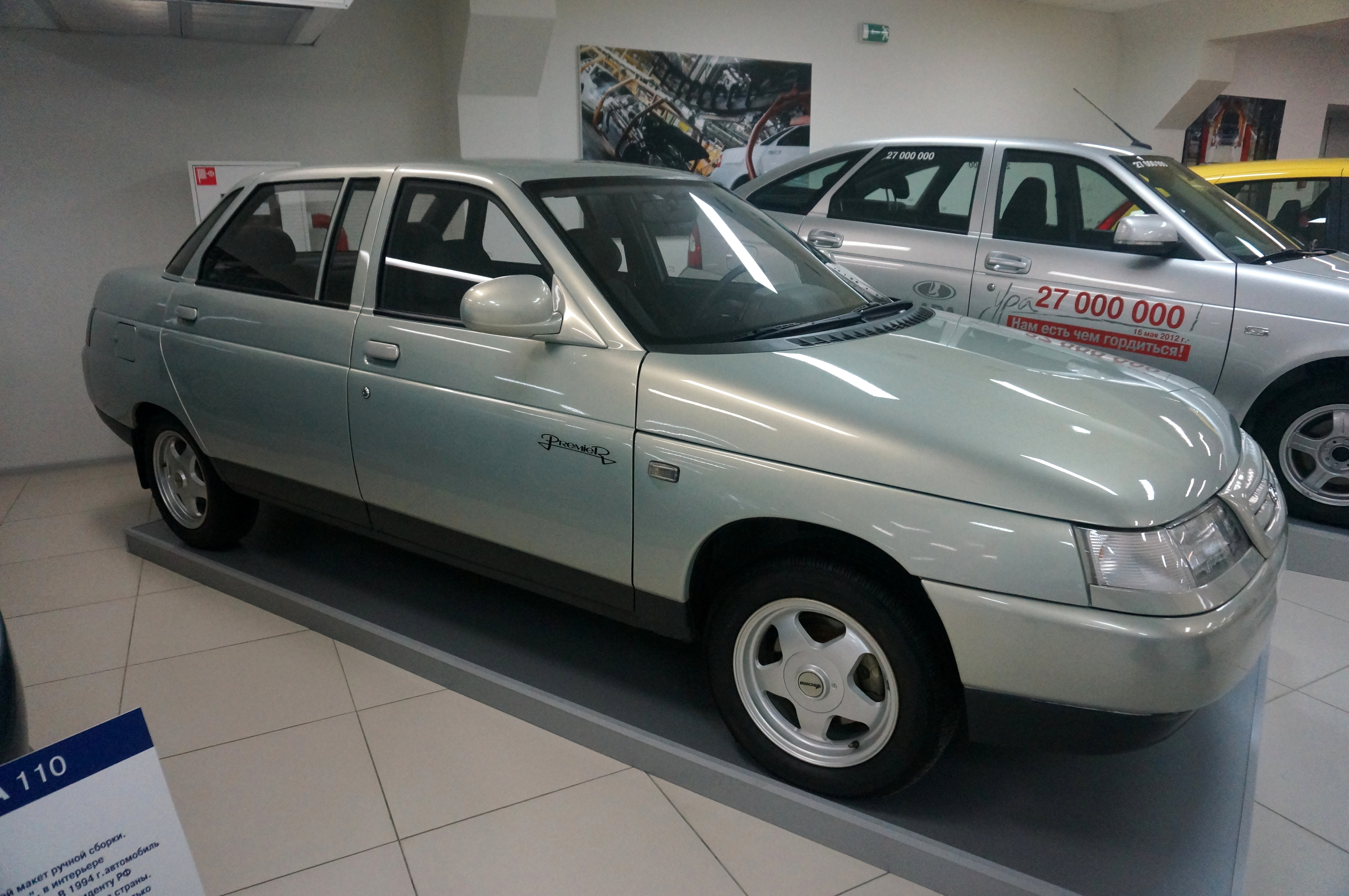
Lada 110 Premier LWB (21108)

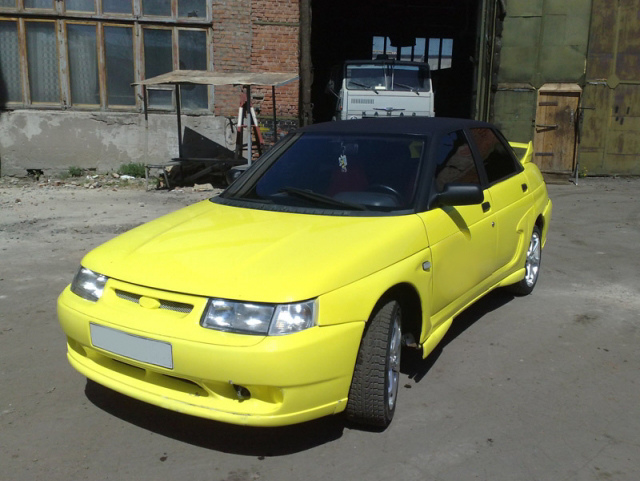
VAZ-21106

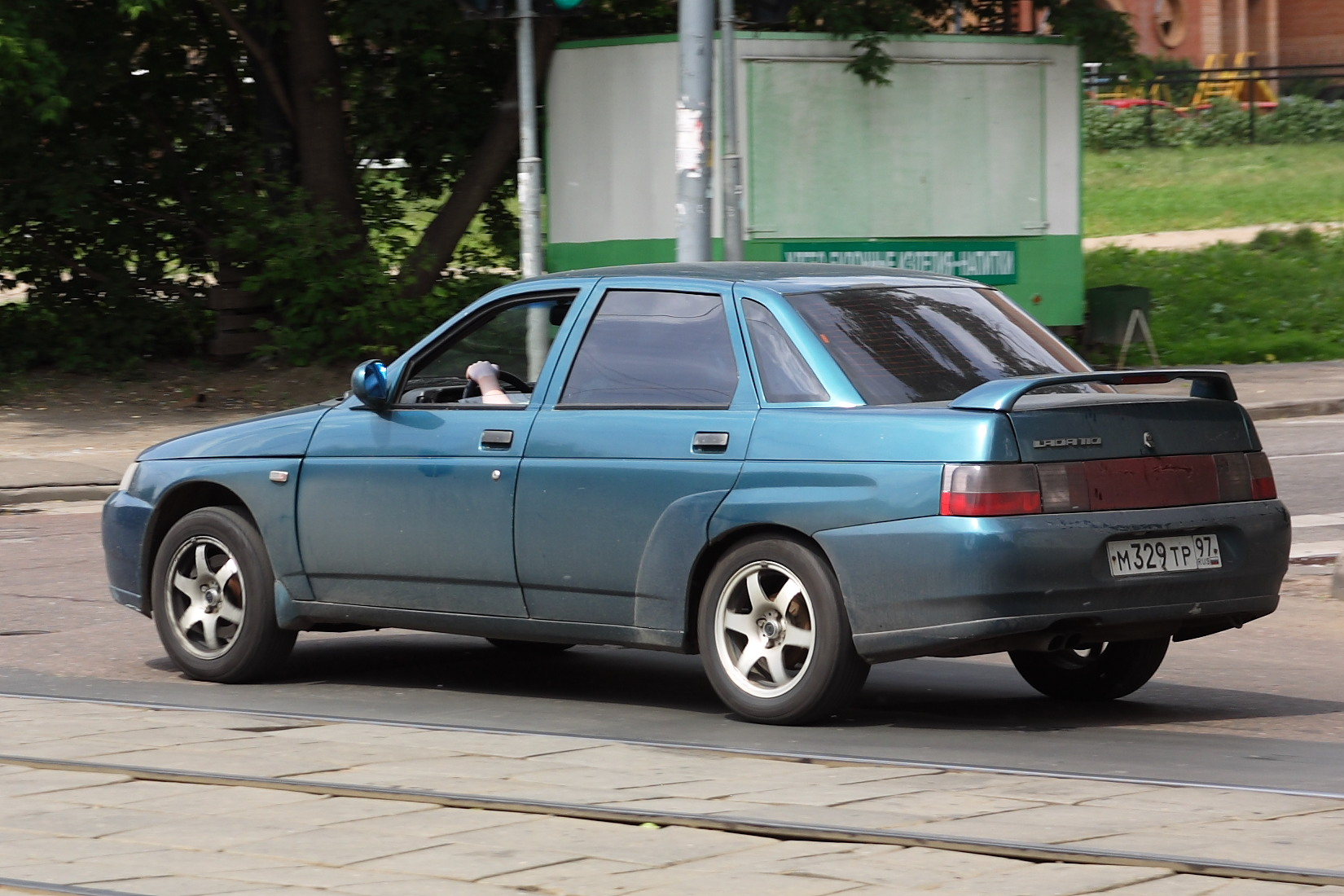
VAZ-21106 (rear view)

== Lada 111 ==
Lada 111
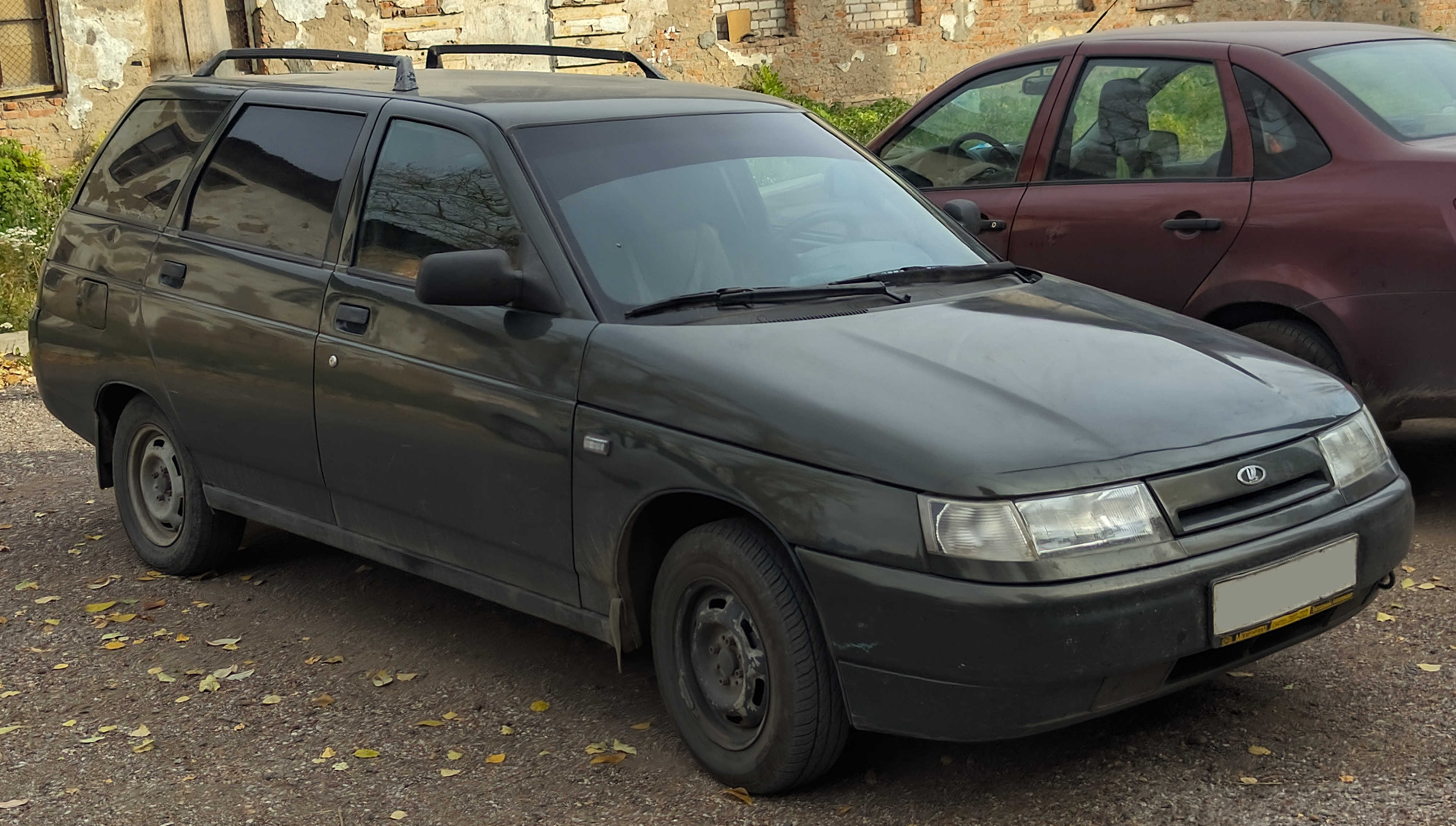

Overview
- Manufacturer: Lada (AvtoVAZ)
- Also called: Bogdan 2111 (Ukraine); Lada 111; Lada Consul (Limo); Lada LUX 110 Dunarea (Romania); Lada Pilgrim (Pickup); Lada Premier (Ecuador); Lada Stawra (Venezuela); Lada Tarzan-2 (SUV); Lada Tarzan DM (commercial vehicle); Lada Vega Wagon (Turkey); VAZ-2111
- Production: 1998–2008
- Assembly: Russia: Tolyatti (AvtoVAZ); Russia: Syzran (RosLada); Romania: Bucharest (Dunarea); Ukraine: Kremenchuk (Kremenchuk Car Assembly)

Body and chassis
- Class: Compact car
- Body style: 5-door estate
- Layout: Front-engine, front-wheel drive
- Related: Lada 110; Lada 112

Powertrain
- Engine: 1.6 L I4 petrol
- Transmission: 5 speed manual

Dimensions
- Wheelbase: 2,492 mm (98.1 in)
- Length: 4,285 mm (168.7 in)
- Width: 1,680 mm (66.1 in)
- Height: 1,480 mm (58.3 in)
- Curb weight: 1,055 kg (2,326 lb)

The Lada 111 or VAZ-2111 is AvtoVAZ's front wheel drive car with a station wagon bodystyle (modification of Lada 110). It was manufactured from 1998 to 2009. The vehicle is still manufactured in Cherkasy by Bogdan, marketed as the "Bogdan 2111", with only minor alterations.

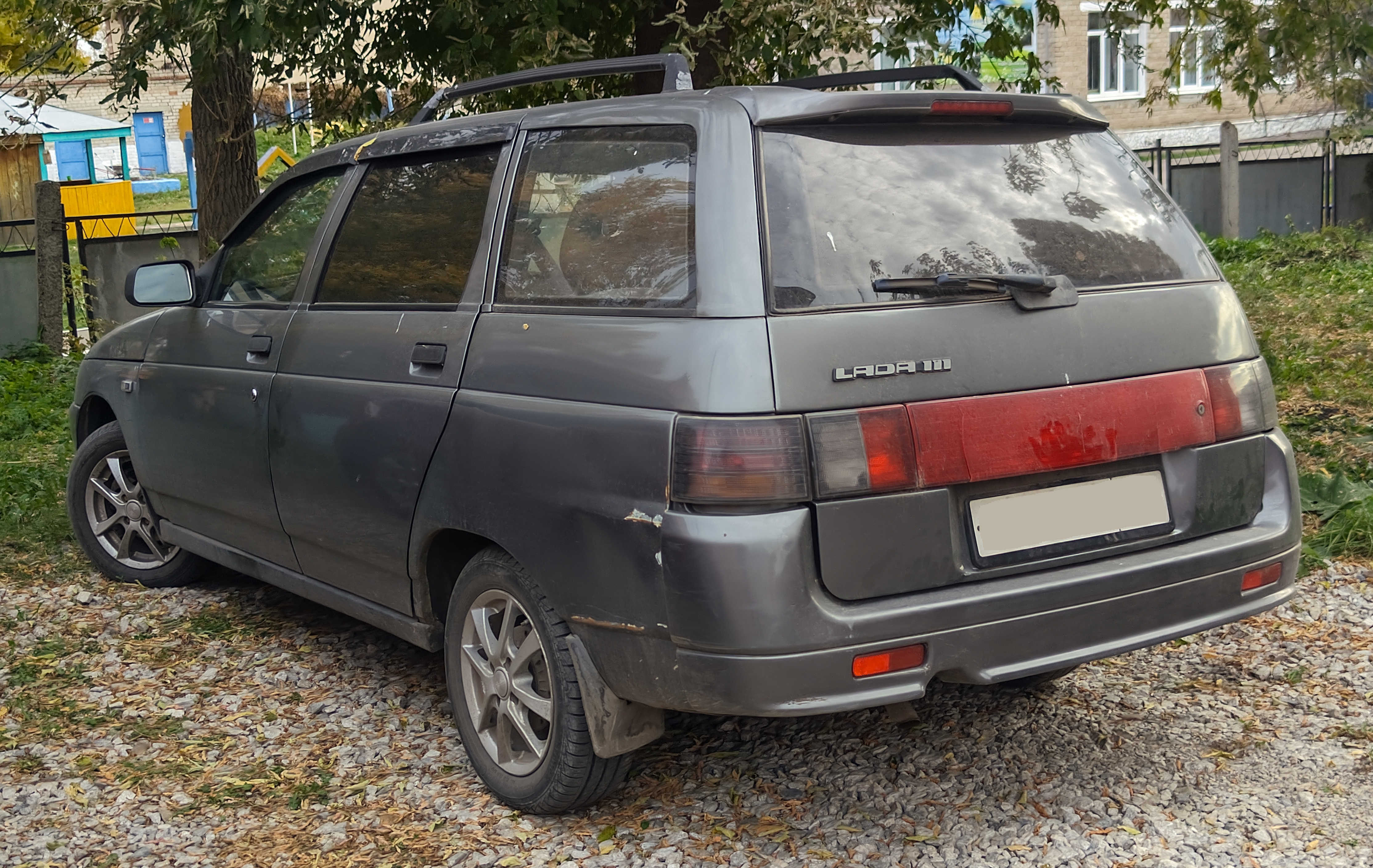
Lada 111 (rear view)

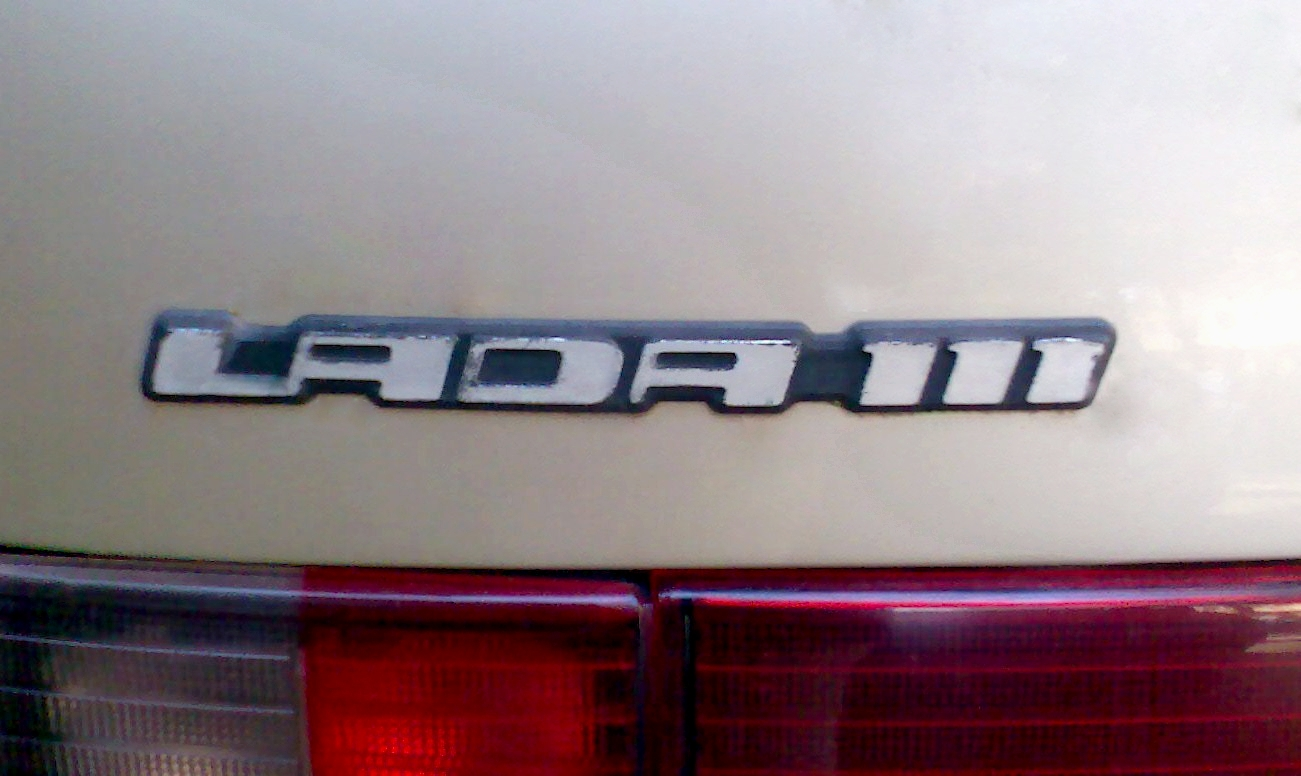
Lada 111 badge

In 1998, a station wagon version of the Lada 110 was introduced - the Lada 111 - the country's first front-wheel drive car with such a bodystyle. The rear seat can be folded in a ratio of 2:3, allowing passengers and bulky/long loads. The luggage compartment, respectively, increased from 490 to 1,420 liters. Front-wheel drive and a rear door give it a low loading height. With a 20 kg (44 lb) total increase in weight and a higher center of mass, wagon's ride is smoother than the sedan's but the handling is not as good in turns.

The wagon was released with options that differ mainly by engine: basic VAZ-21110 With the "standard", "normal" and "luxury" (similar to a sedan car VAZ-21102) with a 1.5-liter 8-valve engine, "2111" and "top-end"VAZ-21113 to trim the" norm "and" luxury "with 16-valve engine," 2112 "and front ventilated disc brakes (like the sedan VAZ-21103). The "2111" and "2112" were equipped with fuel injection and catalytic converter. The VAZ-21111 had a carburetor engine "2110" (production ended in 2002). All-rounders are completed with the "short" primary pair (3.9 instead of 3.7 for VAZ-2110). Since autumn 2004, these versions been taken over by the 1.6-liter 21112 (8 valves) and 21114 (16 valves). The other innovations are those of the 2110.

== Modifications ==
- LADA-21111 (VAZ-21111) — 1.5 liters carburetor engine;
- LADA-21109 (VAZ-21109) Consul — 16-valve 1.6-liter 89 hp 21124-engine with fuel injection (Limo);
- LADA-21110 (VAZ-21110) — 8-valve engine with capacity of 1.5 liters with fuel injection (Lada 111 1.5 Li);
- LADA-21113 (VAZ-21113) — 16-valve engine with capacity of 1.5 liters with fuel injection;
- LADA-21112 (VAZ-21112) — 8-valve 1.6-liter 80 hp 21114-engine with fuel injection;
- LADA-21114 (VAZ-21114) — 16-valve 1.6-liter 89 hp 21124-engine with fuel injection;
- LADA-21116 (VAZ-21116-04) - 2.0-liter 150 hp Opel C20XE engine, four-wheel drive;
- VAZ-2111-90 Tarzan-2 - body of VAZ-21111 on a separate ladder chassis and the mechanicals of Niva, 1.8-liter (80 and 85 hp versions) engine and four-wheel drive (SUV)
- VAZ-2111-90 Pilgrim - body of VAZ-21111 on a separate ladder chassis and the mechanicals of Niva, 1.8-liter (80 and 85 hp versions) engine and four-wheel drive (SUV-Pickup)

== Lada 112 ==
Lada 112
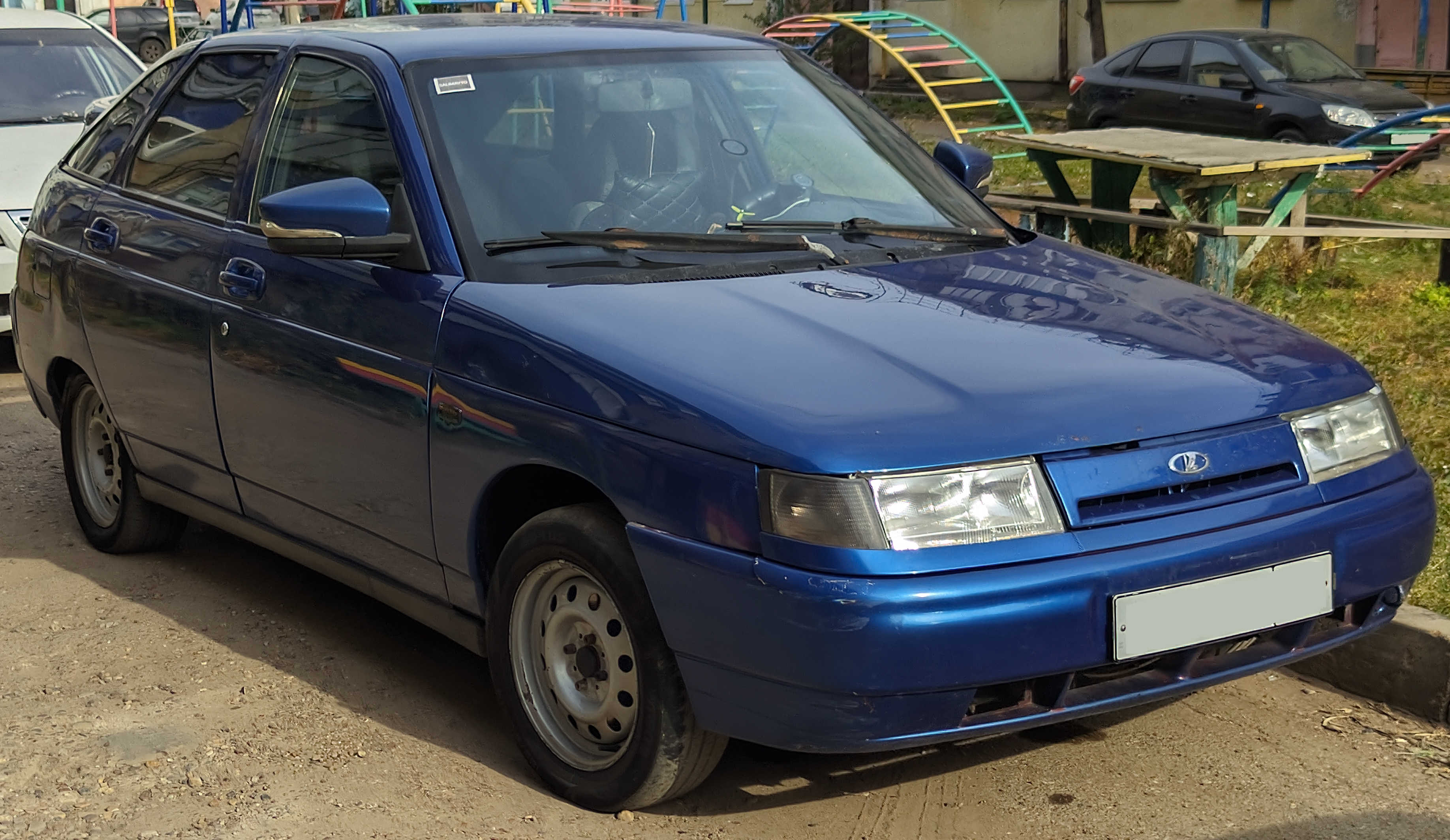

Overview
- Manufacturer: Lada
- Also called: Lada 112; Lada LUX 112 Europa (Romania); Lada Glacial (Venezuela); Lada Sport (Ecuador); Lada Tarzan Sport (SUV version); VAZ 2112
- Production: 1999–2008
- Assembly: Russia: Tolyatti (AvtoVAZ & Super-Avto); Romania: Bucharest (Dunarea)

Body and chassis
- Class: Compact car
- Body style: 5-door hatchback 3-door coupé
- Layout: Front-engine, front-wheel-drive
- Related: Lada 110; VAZ 2111

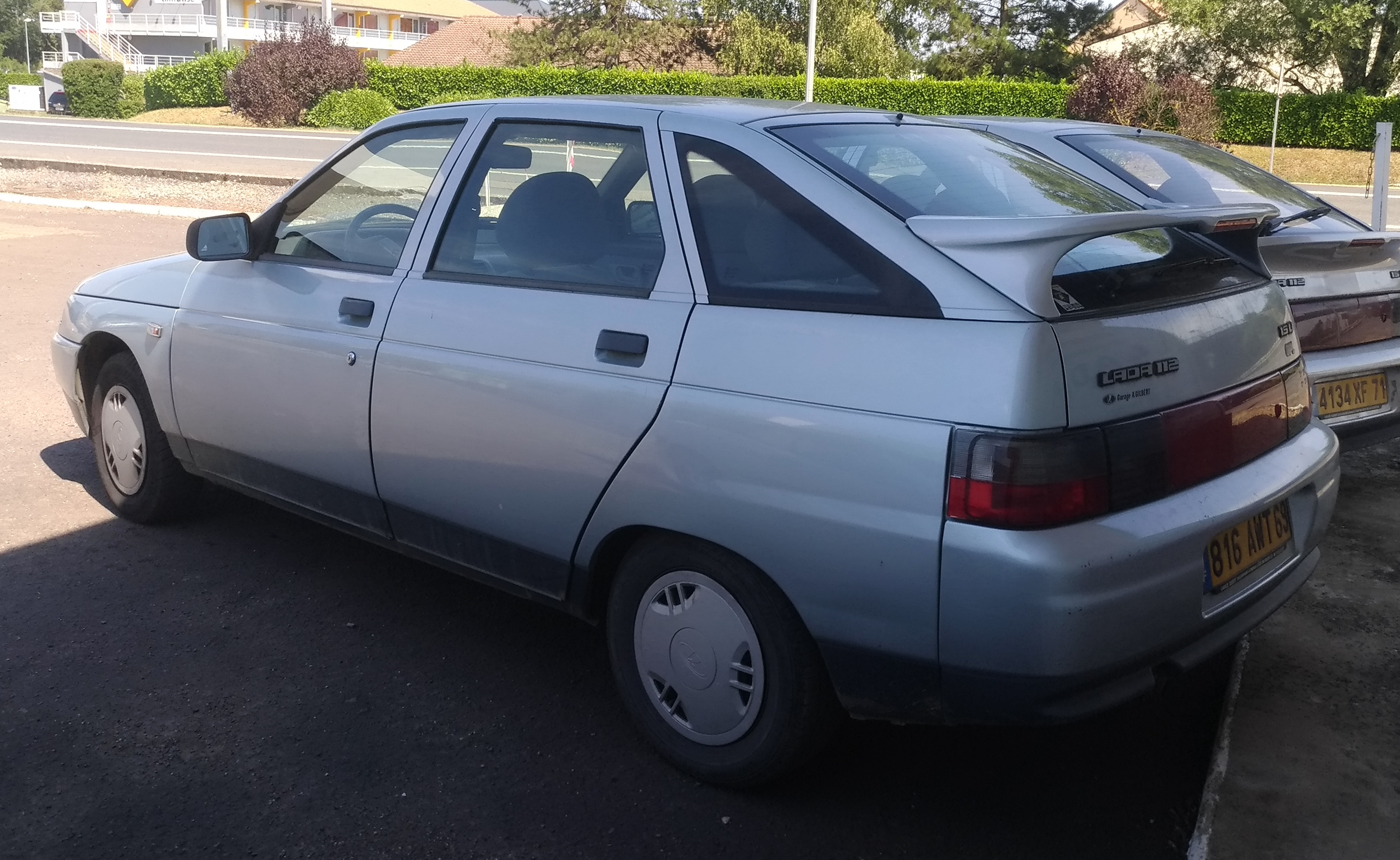
Lada 112 (rear view)

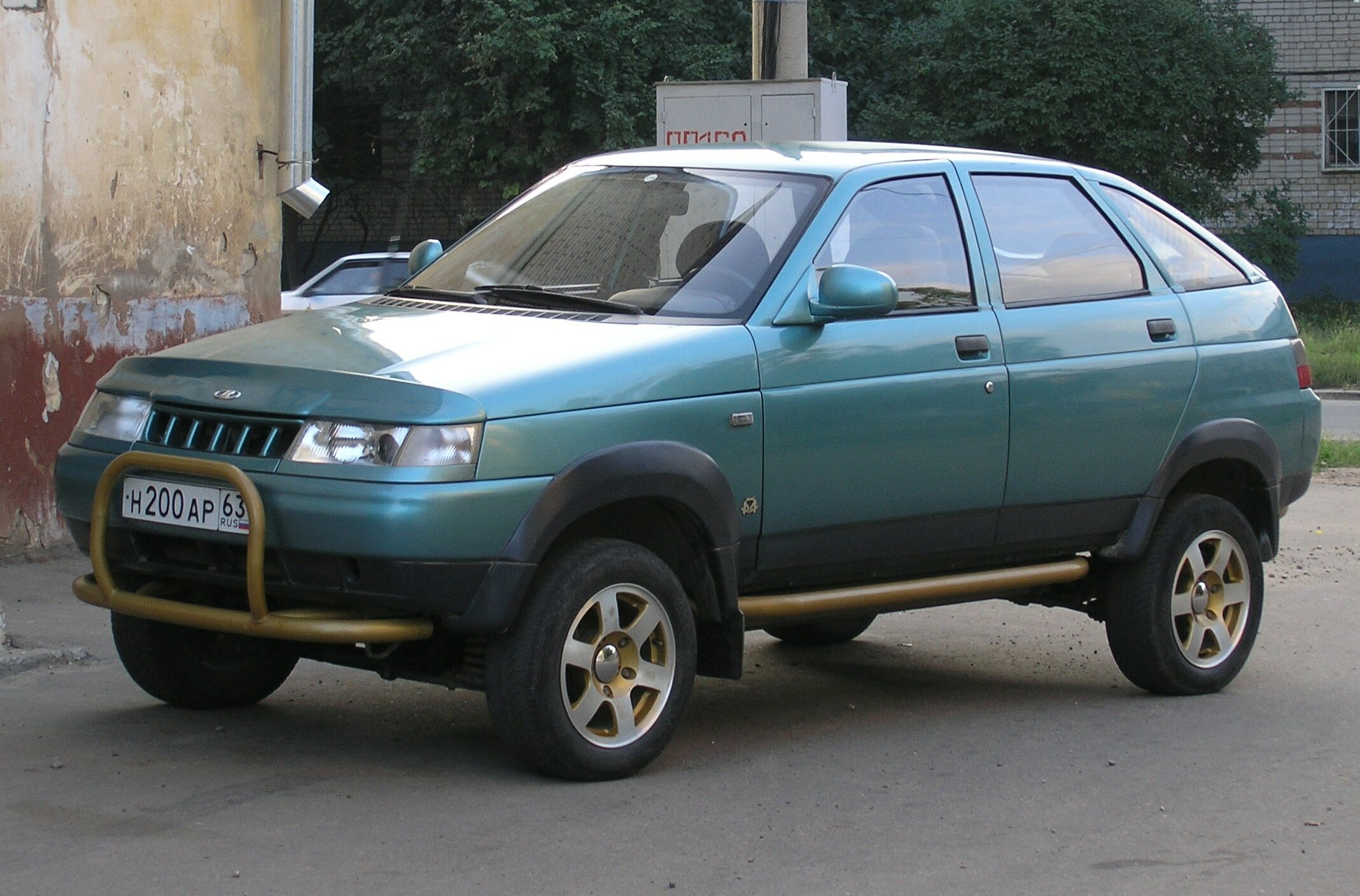
Tarzan-2

The Lada 112 or VAZ-2112 is the hatchback version of the Lada 110. The Lada 112 was introduced in 1999, and is somewhat more modern and luxurious-looking than the traditional Ladas. The car is relatively popular in Russia today. Coming with a 1.5 through 1.6 litre inline-four engine with about 90 hp (67 kW) in either 8 valve or 16 valve versions, the 112 could reach a maximum speed of 185 km/h (115 mph) and accelerate from 0–100 km/h (62 mph) in 12 seconds. It came with a five-speed gearbox and rear drum brakes. Its weight is between 1,050–1,230 kg (2,315–2,712 lb).

The SUV variant Tarzan-2 was offered on this body style configuration too.

=== 112 Coupé ===
AvtoVAZ also provided a 112 Coupé variant, with just three doors instead of the five of the base model. It entered production at VAZ's subsidiary, where it replaced the Lada Nadezhda on the OPP (pilot production subsidiary) lines. The Coupé was dropped from the Lada model range in 2008, with the launch of the Lada Priora hatchback.

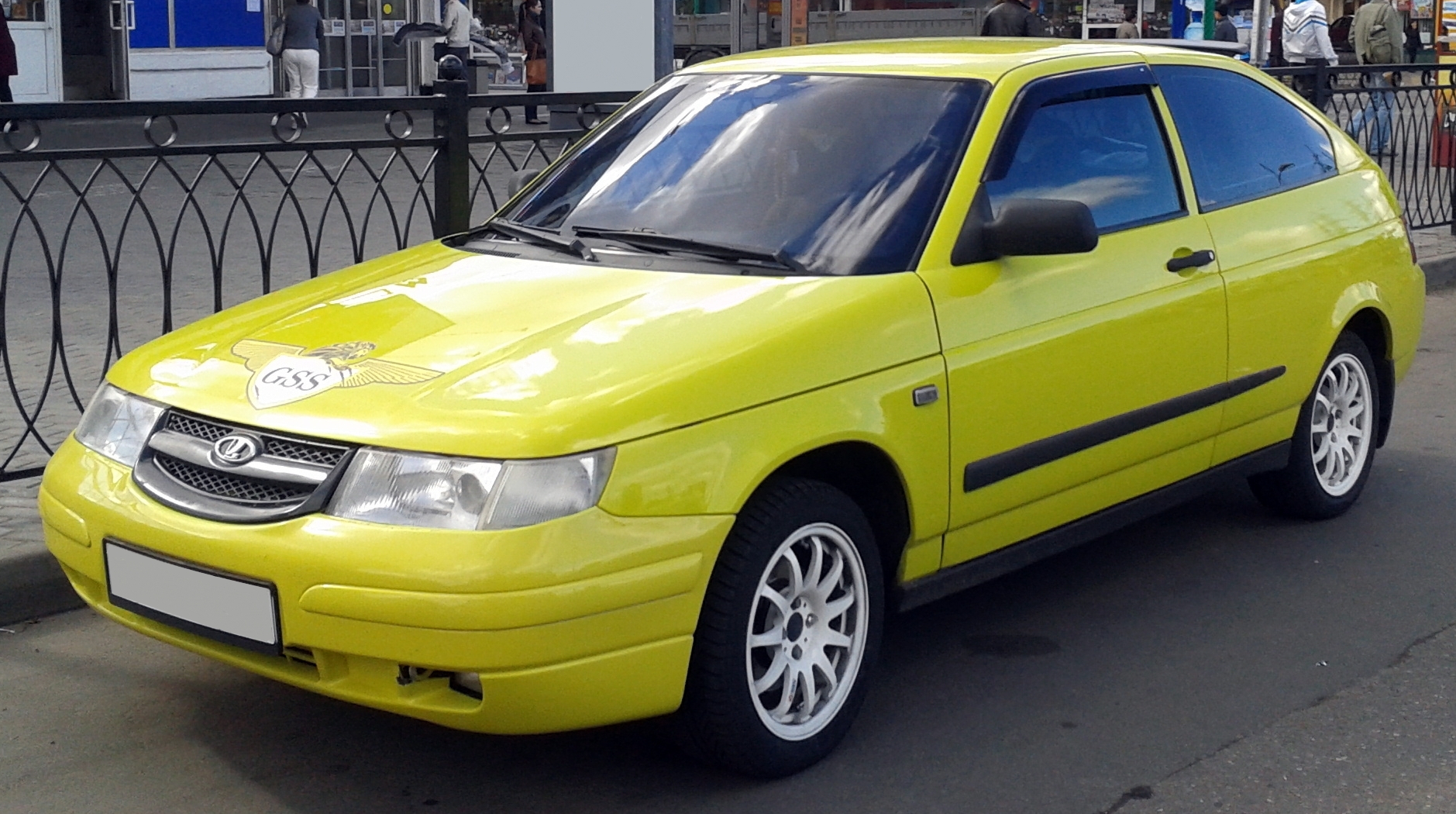
3-door VAZ-21123

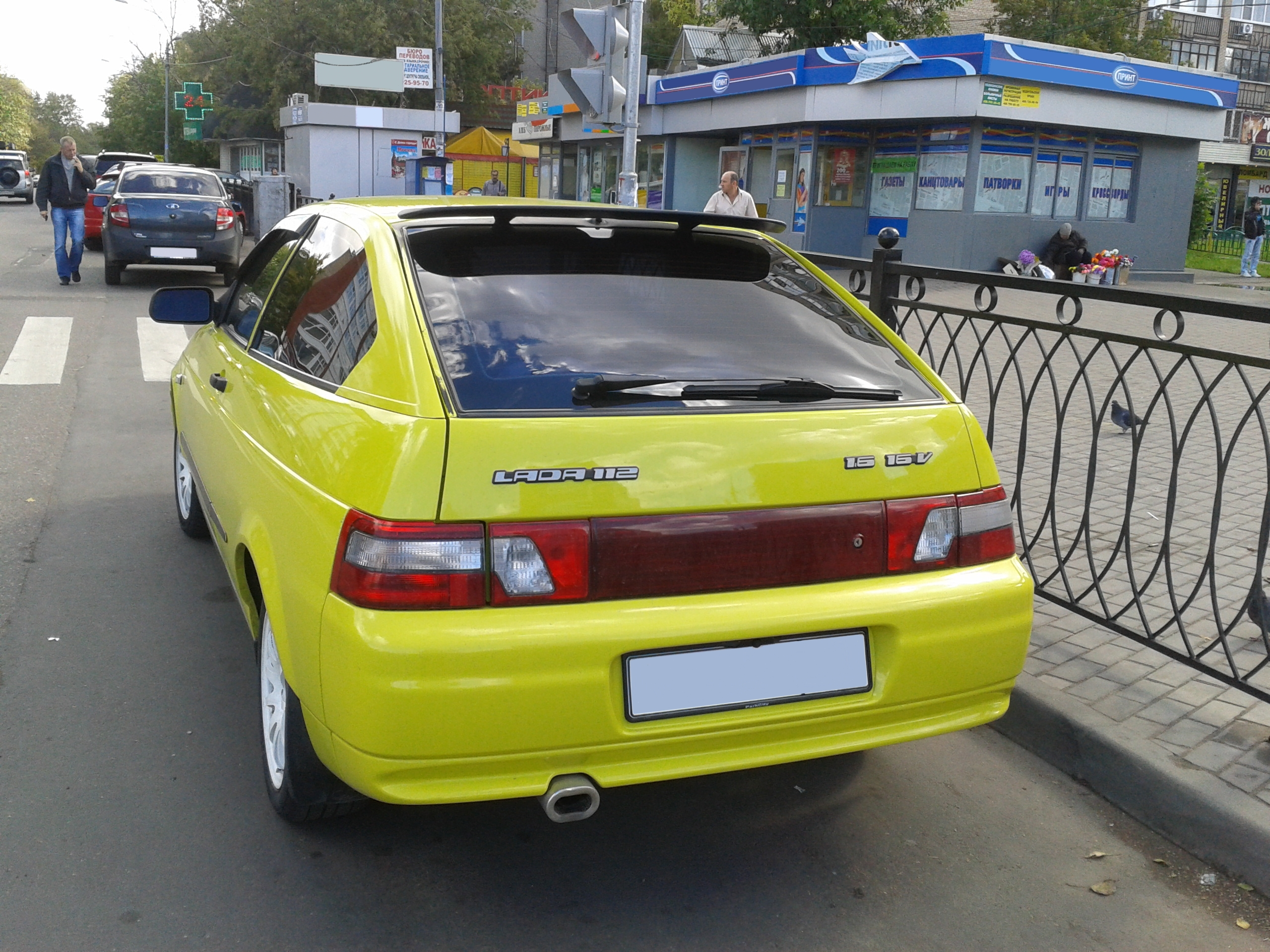
3-door VAZ-21123 (rear view)

== Production outside Russia ==
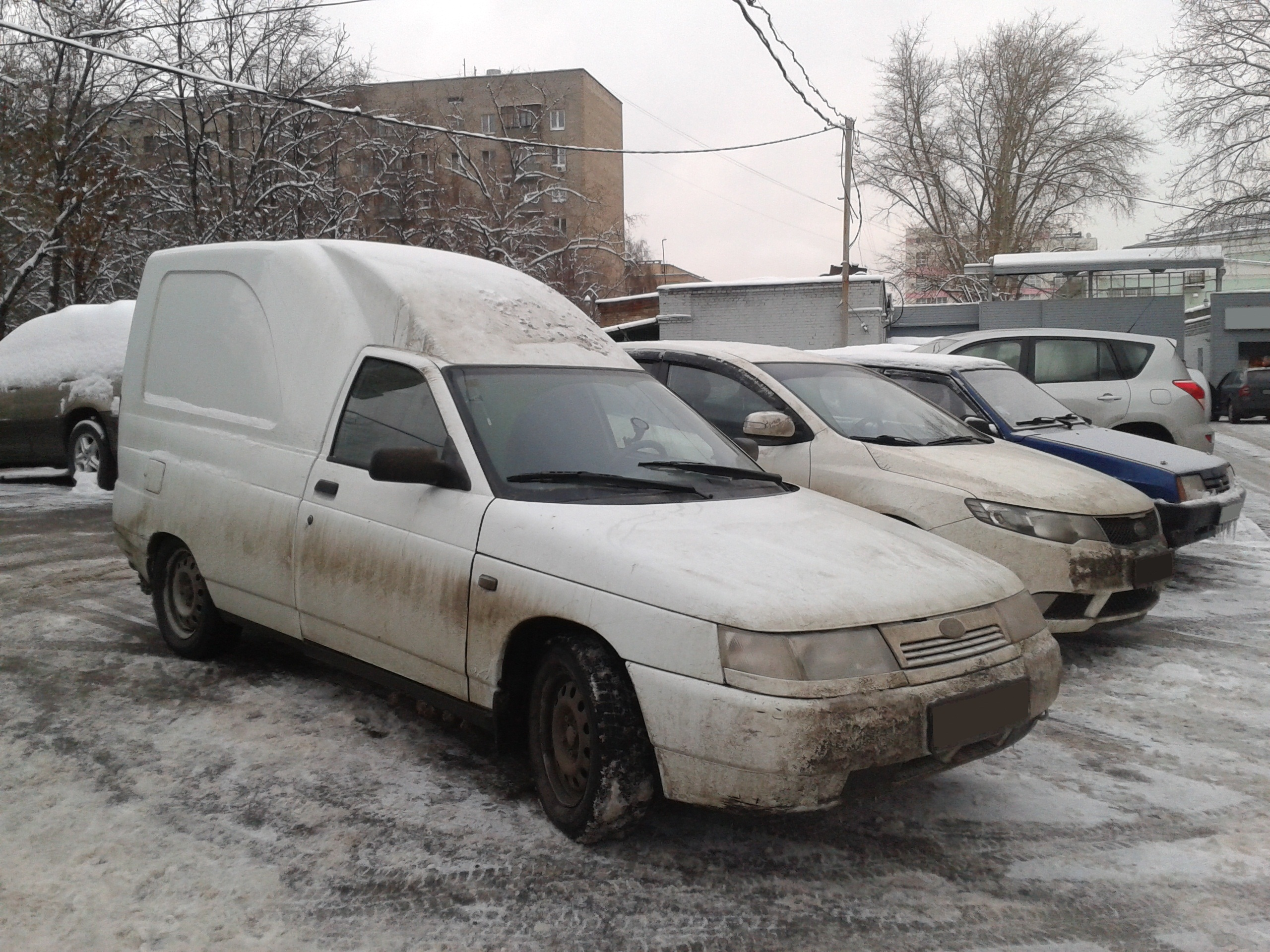
Bogdan 2310 cargo van

In 2007, the 110 was discontinued by Lada; however, Bogdan continued to produce it as the Bogdan 2110 for the Ukrainian market until 2014. Foreign production in Egypt lasted until 2015.

== Safety ==
In 2002 the car was awarded zero stars out of a possible four by the Russian ARCAP safety assessment program. The reviewers noted that the injury criteria did not exceed safe values, the car's interior was well thought out in terms of safety, and the car's body was very rugged, showing better results than those of Nissan Almera, Ford Escort, Mitsubishi Lancer, Hyundai Accent, and Suzuki Baleno. However, the compression of the chest by the seat belt was too high, and the reviewers concluded that the car needed airbags and more modern safety belts equipped with pretensioners and tension limiters to keep up with the new safety standards.

== Racing ==
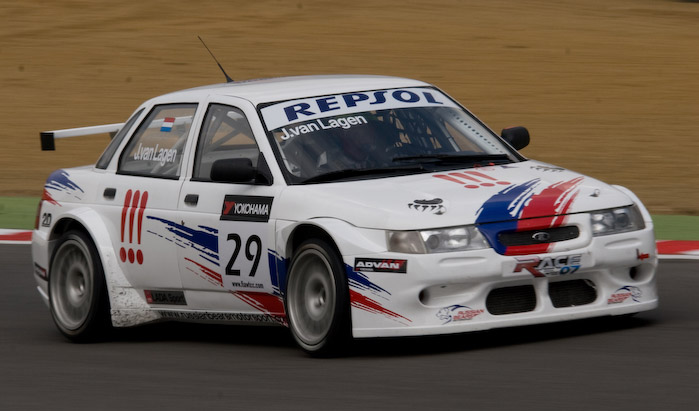
The Lada 110 WTCC car during the 2008 World Touring Car Championship season

The Lada 110 was entered in the 2008 World Touring Car Championship season by the Russian Bears Motorsport team, with Viktor Shapovalov (#28) and Jaap van Lagen (#29) as the drivers.

Team LADA Sport commenced the 2009 World Touring Car Championship season with a trio of 110s for Jaap Van Lagen, Kirill Ladygin and Viktor Shapovalov. The team replaced the 110s with the newer Prioras during the course of the season.
