= Lada Classic =

Lada Classic may refer to:

- Classic (snooker), a professional snooker formerly tournament held in Bournemouth
- Lada English Golf Classic, a professional golf tournament on the European Tour held at The Belfry, Warwickshire in 1979
- A series of medium-sized Lada-branded family cars built by Russian car manufacturer AvtoVAZ, based on the design of the Fiat 124:
  - VAZ-2101
  - VAZ-2102
  - VAZ-2103
  - VAZ-2106
  - Lada Riva
