= C-segment =

Mid-sized car classification

2020-present best-selling C-segment cars

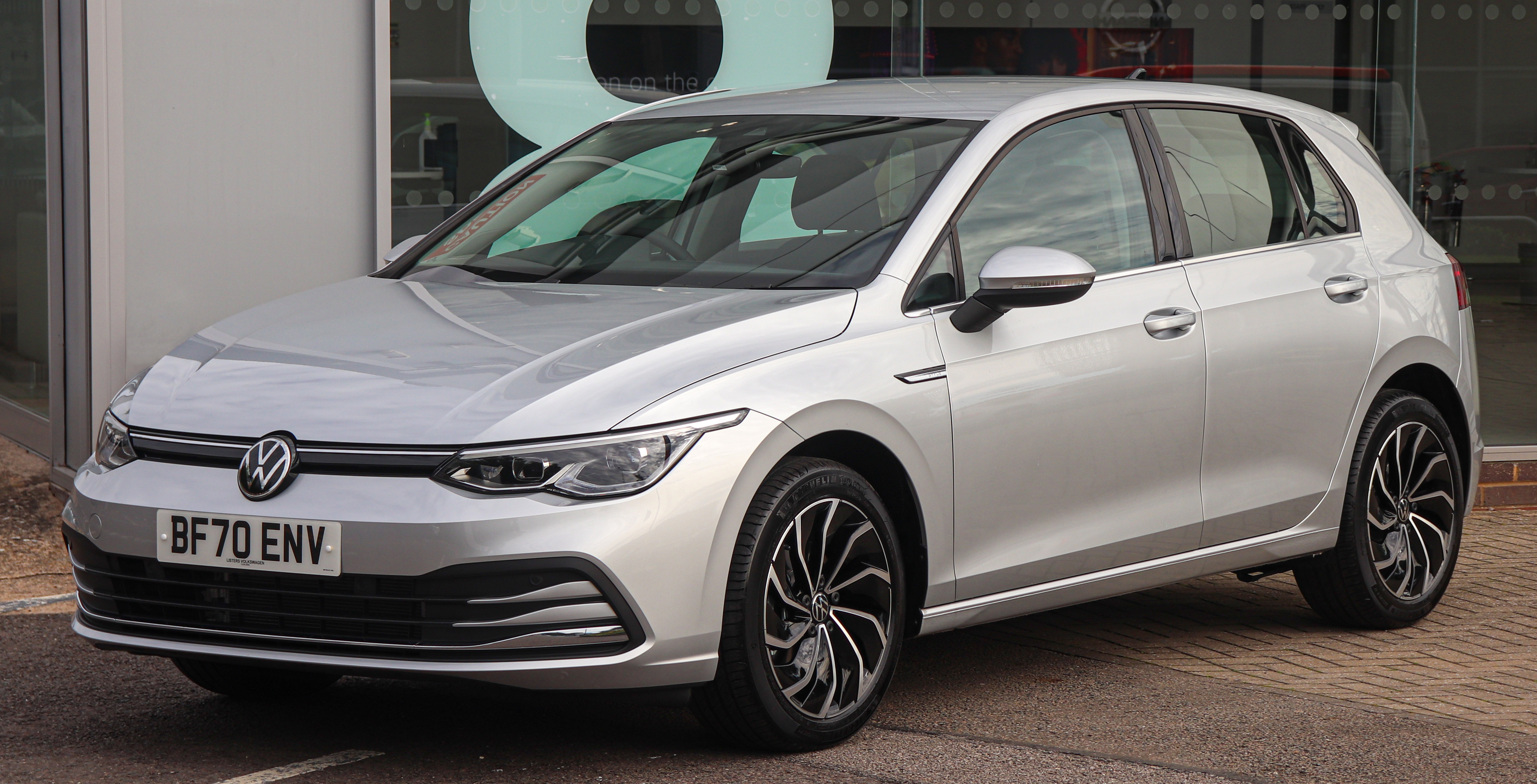
Volkswagen Golf 8th generation (2019–present)

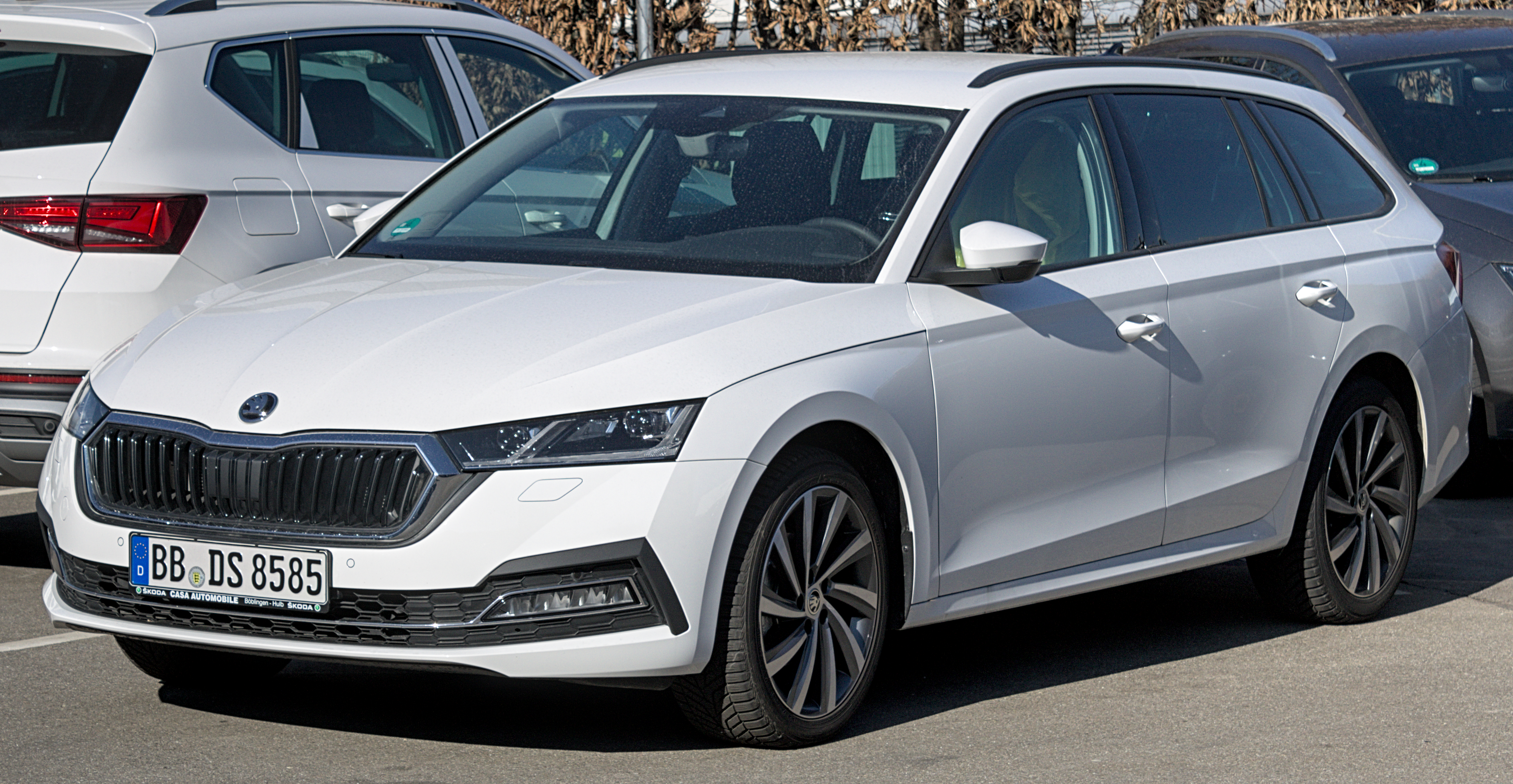
Škoda Octavia 4th generation (2020–present)

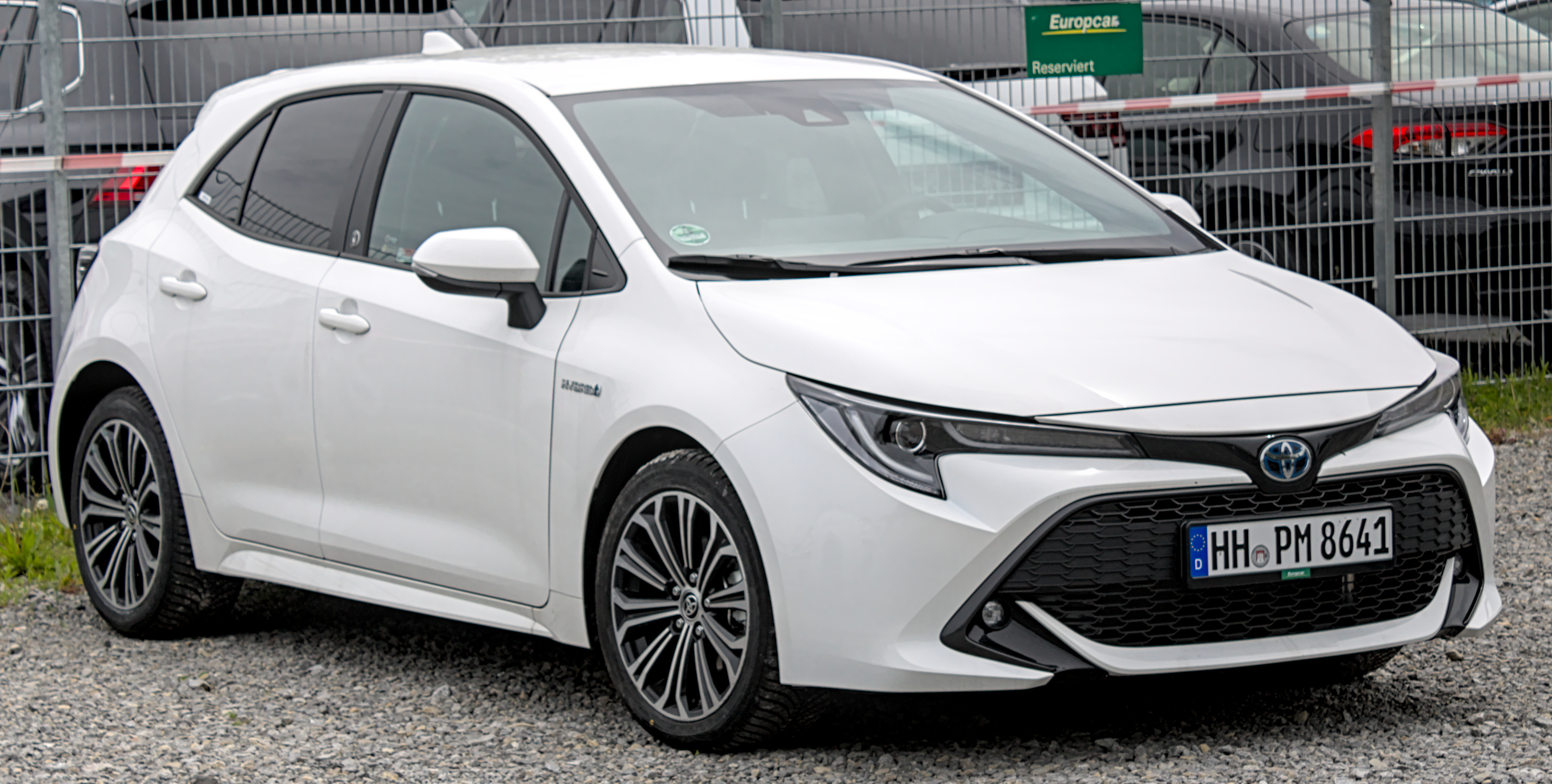
Toyota Corolla 12th generation (2018–present)

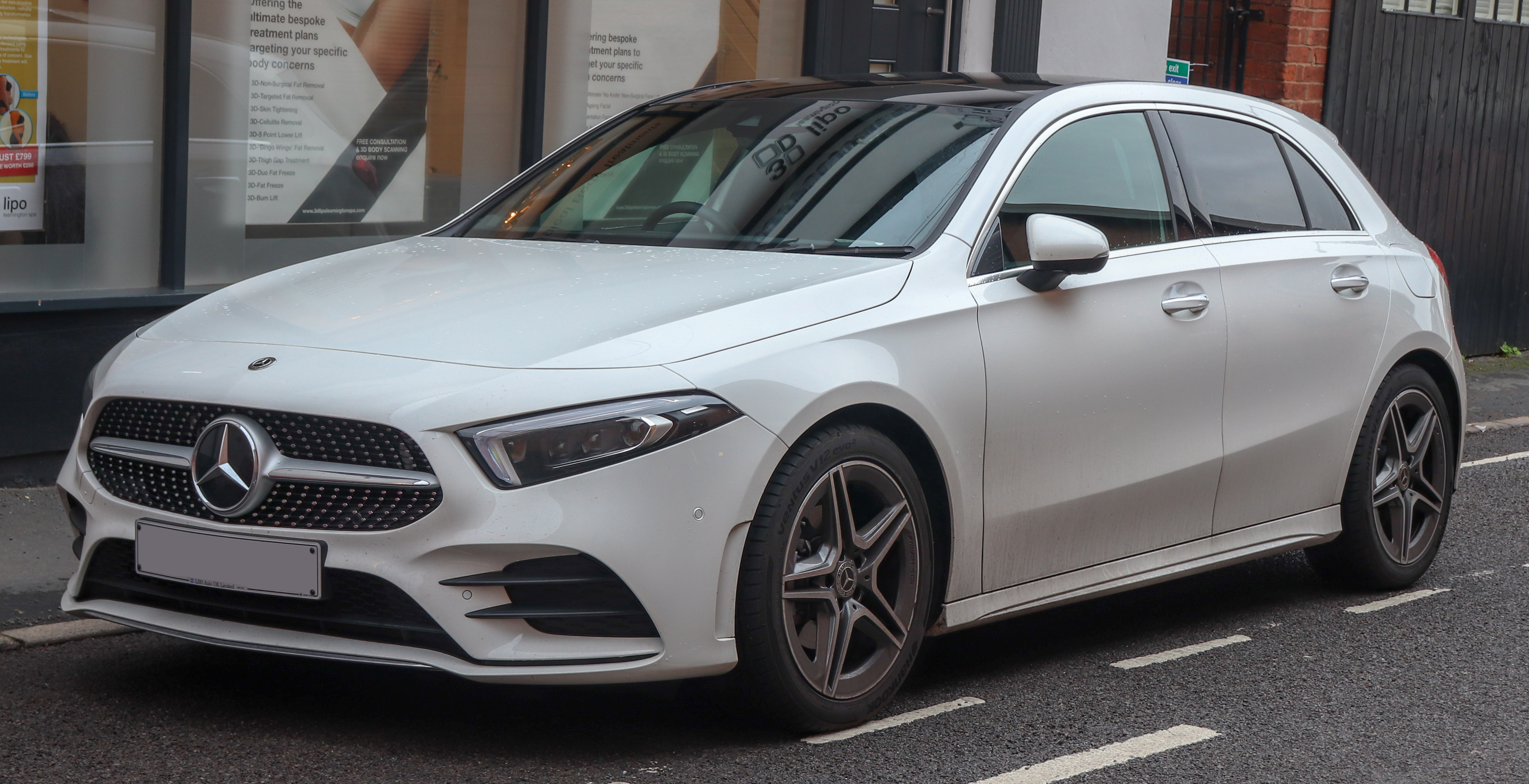
Mercedes-Benz A-Class 4th generation (2018–present)

The C-segment is the third smallest category of the European segments for passenger cars, described as "medium cars", and broadly corresponds to the compact car class used in the United States and Canada, the Euro NCAP "small family car" size class, and similar mid-sized categories used in other major markets such as China and Japan. C-segment cars are typically 4.2 to 4.6 m (13.8 to 15.1 ft) long and are most often sold as hatchbacks and estates in Europe, though sedans predominate in North America and much of Asia.

The segment's modern hatchback form dates to the 1974 Volkswagen Golf, whose front-wheel-drive layout was widely copied across Europe within a decade. Long dominated worldwide by models such as the Golf, the Ford Focus, the Toyota Corolla, and the Honda Civic, the segment has faced sustained pressure since the mid-2000s from compact crossover SUVs, and more recently from the global shift toward hybrid and electric vehicles.

By 2024, SUVs accounted for a record 54% of new car registrations in Europe, while the C-segment's own European market share fell to 13.9%.

== Definition ==
The European segments are not based on size or weight criteria. In practice, C-segment cars have been described as having a length of approximately 4.5 m (14.8 ft). As of 2021, C-segment category sizes span from approximately 4.2 to 4.6 m (13.8 to 15.1 ft).

Examples include Volkswagen Golf, Toyota Corolla, Mercedes-Benz A-Class, Ford Focus, SEAT León, BMW 1 Series, Audi A3, Citroën C4 and Honda Civic.

== Characteristics ==
The most common body styles for C-segment cars in Europe are hatchbacks, followed by sedans and wagons/estates. In North America and much of Asia, four-door saloons/sedans are more common than hatchbacks.

== History ==
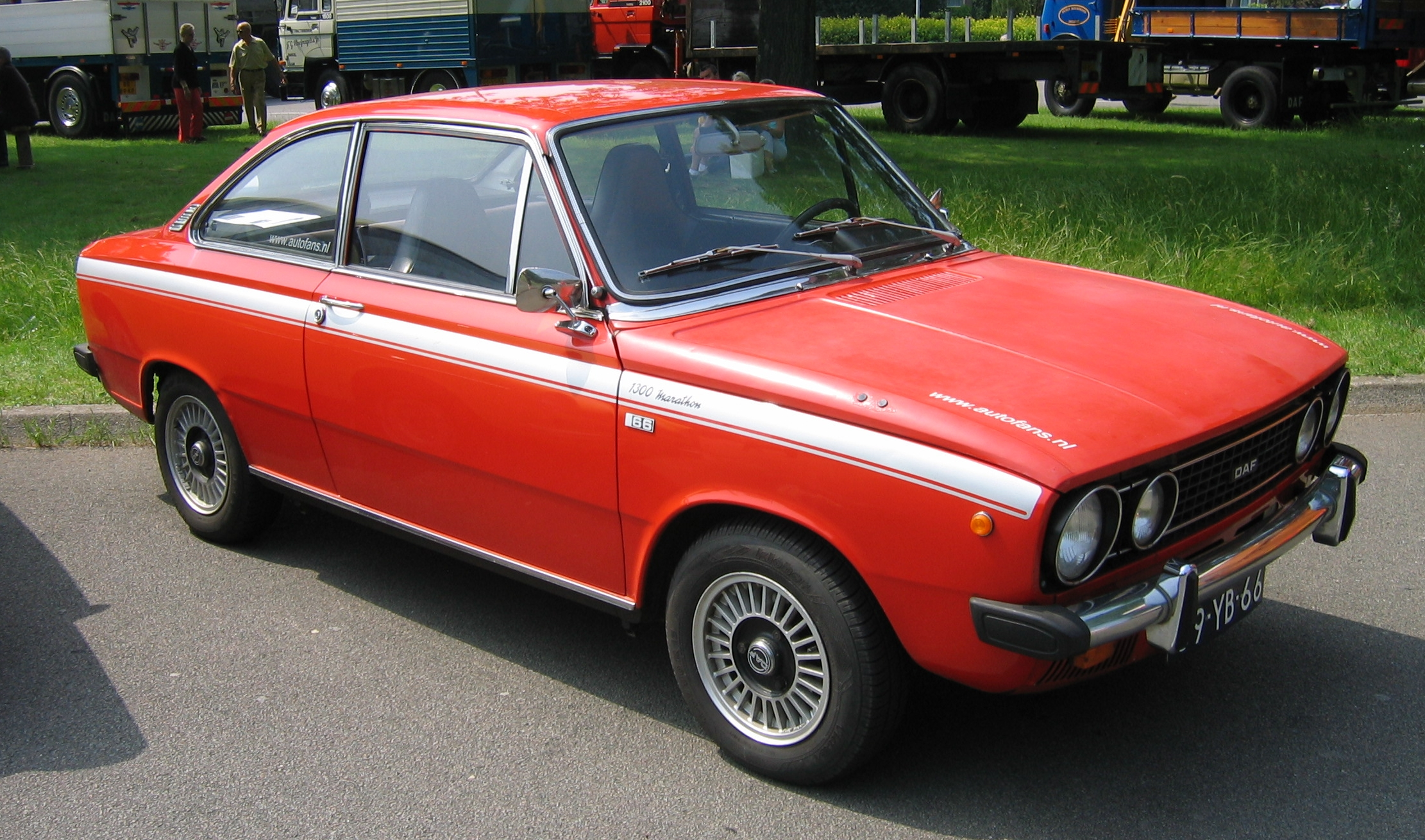
DAF 66 Marathon Coupe (1972–1975)

After the Second World War, European manufacturers usually featured two vehicle types: small economy cars that were usually saloons and large saloons. By the 1960s, the post-war economic boom had produced customers who wanted something of intermediate size. These were usually saloons during the 1950s and 1960s.

The world's first hatchback, the 1958 Austin A40 Farina Countryman with FR layout, that was a co-development of BMC and the Italian design house Pininfarina at a time when this was unusual. It had a lift-up rear window and drop-down boot lid. It was also sold as a two-door saloon. It was built in Italy by Innocenti as well as in the UK. For 1965 Innocenti designed a new single-piece rear door for their Combinata version of the Countryman. This top-hinged door used struts to hold it up over a wide cargo opening and was a true hatchback – a model never developed in the home (United Kingdom) market. The Countryman name has estate-car associations, and BMC successor company Rover used the name on estate cars / Station Wagons so it is largely forgotten. This hatchback layout, along with the European switch to front-wheel drive (FF layout), was further pioneered by the smaller 1964 (Fiat) Autobianchi Primula.

The modern C-segment market in Europe can be traced back to the 1968 launch of the Renault 6, the first successful hatchback of this size. The hatchback bodystyle was first introduced by Renault with the 1964 Renault 16, which was elected the 1965 Car of the year in Europe. A review in the English Motoring Illustrated in May 1965 stated: "The Renault Sixteen can thus be described as a large family car but one that is neither a four door saloon and nor is it quite an estate. But, importantly, it is a little different." Even the later similar-sized cars like the Ford Escort, Vauxhall Viva, Austin Allegro and Hillman Avenger were still only available as saloons or estates, although some cars of this size, like the BMC/BL 1100 and 1300 saloons and Italy's Fiat 128 featured front-wheel drive from their launch during the 1960s.

The C-segment was revolutionized in 1974 with the launch of the Volkswagen Golf, a front-wheel-drive hatchback, which was hugely successful all over Europe. Within a decade, most cars of this size in Europe were front-wheel-drive hatchbacks. These included the Fiat Ritmo (Strada in the UK), Ford Escort (from the MK3 model launched in 1980), Opel Kadett (Vauxhall Astra in the UK), Renault 11, and the Talbot Horizon (originally a Chrysler/Simca until Peugeot took over Chrysler's European division in 1979). Most manufacturers still offered a traditional saloon of this size though, with Volkswagen using the Golf as the base for its Jetta saloon, and Ford launching the Escort-based Orion in 1983. Also in the 1980s saloons became popular again in certain Western European markets, often with a different model name than the hatchback, for example the Renault 9 (Renault 11-based), Fiat Regata (Ritmo-based) and SEAT Málaga.

Some carmakers later created the liftback bodystyle like the Peugeot 309, which replaced the Talbot Horizon in this sector at the end of 1985.

Since the mid-1990s, premium brands usually associated with larger and more expensive cars have entered the C-segment with more affordable hatchbacks and saloons. The first such example was the Audi A3 in 1996. Subsequent cars of this type include the BMW 1 Series and Mercedes-Benz A-Class.

During the 2000s, coupé convertibles (cabriolets) using components from these vehicles were also built, including the Peugeot 307 CC and later 308 CC in the first generation, the third-generation Opel Astra TwinTop, the second-generation Ford Focus Coupe-Convertible, and the Volkswagen Eos.

=== France ===
Early successful compact family cars by French manufacturers are Citroën GSA hatch version of the 1970 GS, Peugeot 304 and Renault 14. During 1980s, Citroën replaced the GSA with the 1983 BX that was between the sizes of the small family car and large family car, in an attempt to cover both markets with single model. The Citroën ZX was the model which celebrated the entry of PSA Group (now Stellantis) in China during early 1990s.

=== Former USSR/Russia ===
Cars of the Soviet/Russian brand Lada: VAZ-2101, VAZ-2103, VAZ-2106, Lada Riva (based on the Fiat 124 and Fiat 125) and Lada Samara (since 1984) were very popular in Central and Eastern Europe in the 1970s and 1980s. The modern-day Lada's compact cars are Lada Priora and Lada Vesta. There was also the lineup of the AZLK-factory, Moskvitch (from 1947 to 2003): 400, 402, 408, 412, Izh 2125 (the first Soviet hatchback), 2140 and Aleko.

== Europe ==
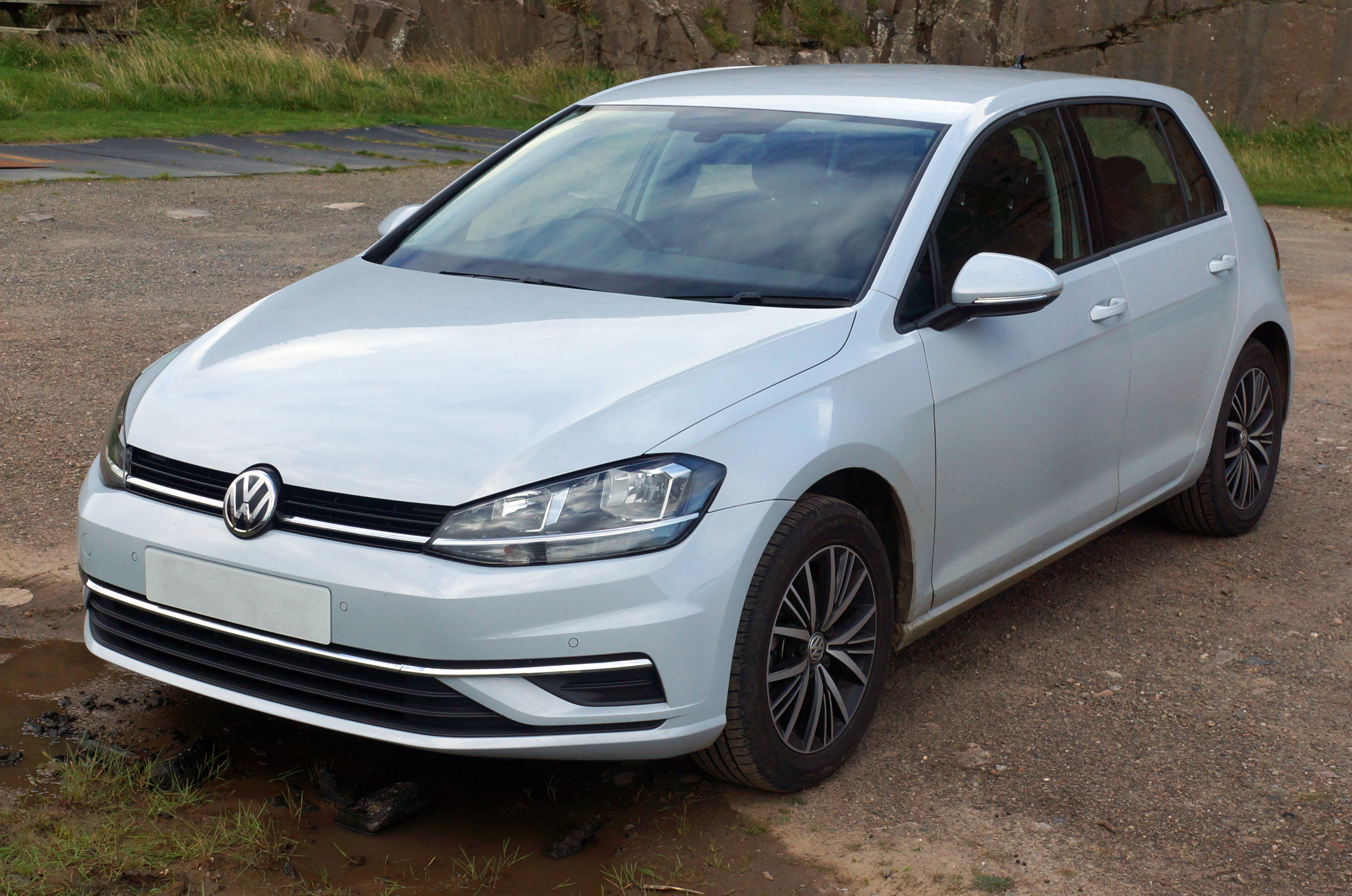
Volkswagen Golf

According to 2011 sales, compact cars are currently the second segment in Europe after the subcompact one (which in Europe corresponds to A-segment + B-segment), with approximately 3 million units sold.

Because of the Volkswagen Golf's defining role and long-standing dominance of the class, it is often referred to as the "Golf segment" in much of Europe.

Mainstream compact saloons began falling out of favour from the 1990s onward, a decline that continued through the 2000s and 2010s alongside reduced sales of four-door saloon variants of C-segment hatchbacks such as the Peugeot 306 and Ford Focus.

=== Compact MPVs ===
During the late 1990s, compact MPVs increased in popularity as a competitor to the compact car, with models such as the Renault Scenic and the Citroën C4 Picasso becoming popular in Europe. By the early 2010s, demand for compact MPVs was declining, due to the rise of the compact SUV.

=== Market share ===
The C-segment's market share in Europe has declined steadily since the late 2010s as buyers have shifted toward SUVs and crossovers.

==== 2019 ====
The compact car segment in Europe sees 5% fewer deliveries in 2019, as Europe's #2 segment is down to 2.65 million sales, or 16.9% of the total European car market, down from 18% in 2018.

==== 2020 ====
Sales of compact cars in Europe are down 24% to 2.03 million in 2020, perfectly in line with the overall market. And while Europeans bought more small crossovers than compact cars in the first three quarters of the year, in the full-year score the pecking order is returned to "normal", with an advantage of 17,000 sales for the compact class. This result is mostly due to a wave of VW ID.3 (self)registrations, especially in December.

==== 2021–2024 ====
The pandemic-era semiconductor shortage kept European registrations depressed, with January 2022 recording the worst monthly total since 1991; SUVs nonetheless reached a record 49.7% share that month, rising to 52.8% by January 2024. Compact SUVs (C-SUVs) — a related but distinct category from the C-segment — were the largest contributor to this growth, accounting for around 42% of all SUV registrations by 2024.

==== 2025–2026 ====
SUVs' overall share of the European market reached 57% by August 2025. Electrification compounded the pressure on traditional C-segment models: battery electric vehicles (BEVs) reached a 20.2% share in August 2025 and 22.2% by April 2026, while combustion-engined registrations continued to decline sharply.

=== History in the United Kingdom ===
==== 1970s ====
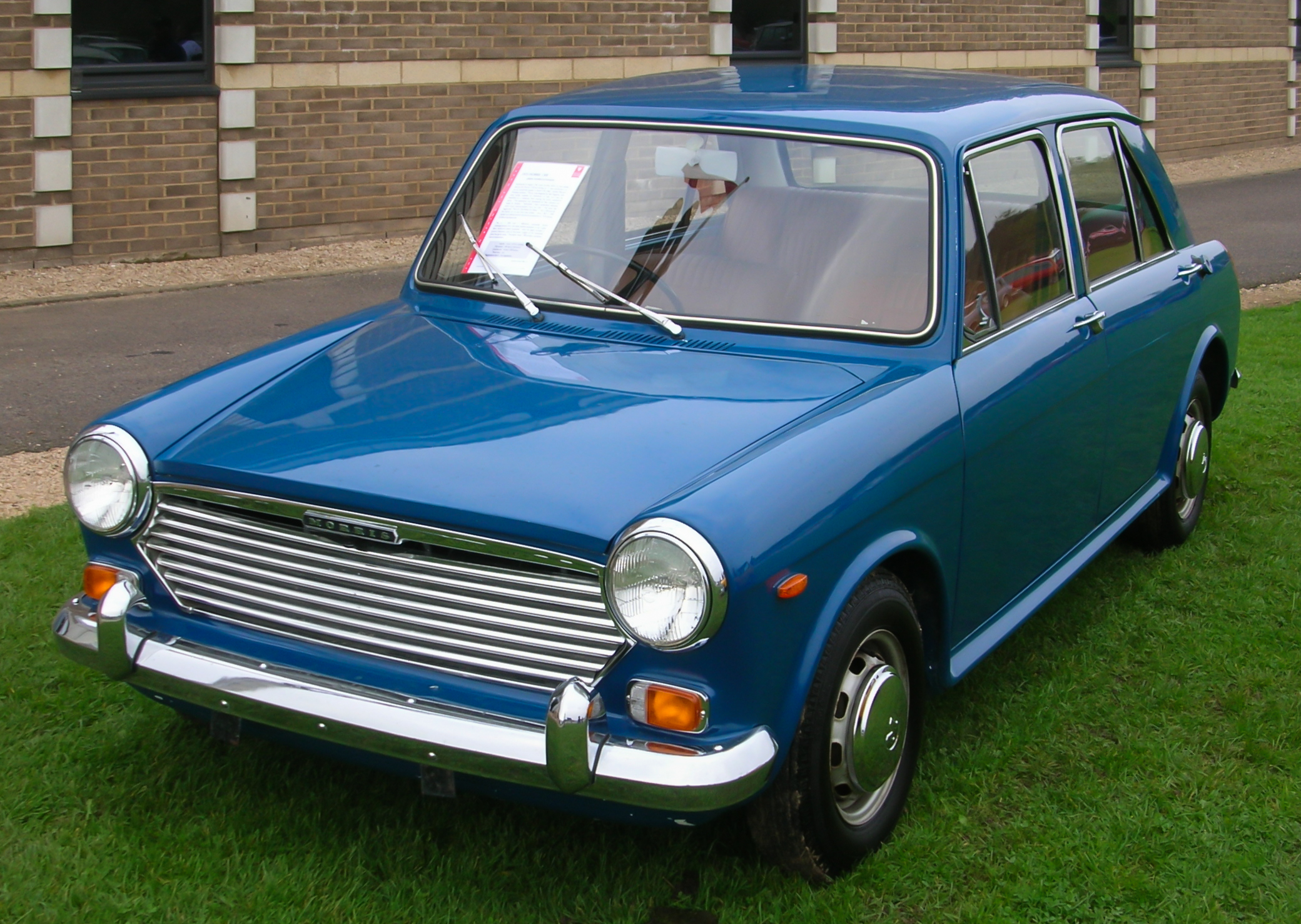
Morris 1300 (1971–1974)

At the start of the 1970s, the two most popular sectors of the UK market were small family cars and large family cars. From its launch in 1962, the small family BMC 1100/1300 was often Britain's best selling car; other locally produced compact cars included the Ford Escort, Vauxhall Viva and Hillman Avenger. Imported small family cars that were popular in the UK included the Citroën GS and Datsun Sunny 120Y.

British Leyland replaced the BMC 1100/1300 with a variety of models: the 1969 Austin Maxi, the 1971 Morris Marina, and the 1973 Austin Allegro.

A second-generation Ford Escort (jointly designed in Britain and Germany) was released in 1974. The same year, the German Volkswagen Golf front-wheel-drive hatchback was released, becoming one of the first significantly imported small family cars in the UK market. The sporty "GTI" version of the Golf sparked a huge demand for "hot hatches" in the UK and many other countries.

The third-generation Vauxhall Viva was produced until late 1979, when it was replaced by the Vauxhall Astra (a rebadged Opel Kadett D which was initially produced in West Germany and Belgium).

The Astra was part of a late-1970s transition in small family cars from being predominantly rear-wheel-drive saloons to front-wheel-drive hatchbacks (increasingly popular in mainland Europe by then). The Austin Allegro – introduced five years earlier – was front-wheel-drive, but was built only in saloon and estate body styles. Only the related Austin Maxi was a hatchback.

The Hillman Avenger (marketed as a Chrysler Avenger 1976–1979 and as a Talbot Avenger 1979–1981) continued to sell well, in spite of the 1978 launch of the Talbot Horizon front-wheel-drive hatchback.

==== 1980s ====
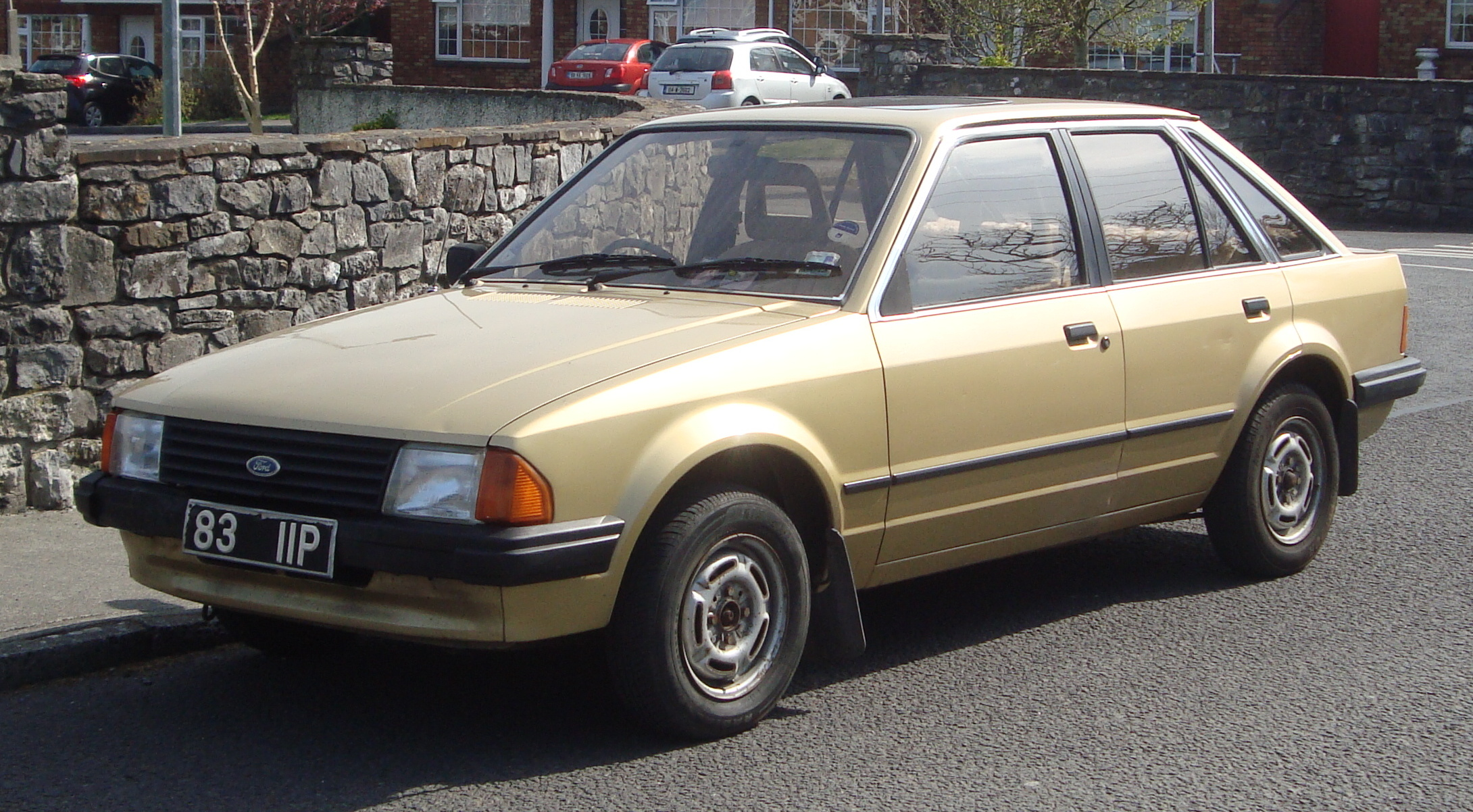
Ford Escort Mk3 (1980–1986)

The Ford Escort Mk3 went on sale in the autumn of 1980, replacing the rear-wheel-drive saloon format of the Mk2 with a hatchback and front-wheel drive. (A saloon version called the Ford Orion was added in 1983.) Only in 1983 was the Austin Allegro replaced by the Austin Maestro hatchback. In 1984, the Vauxhall Astra Mk2 hatchback/estate/cabriolet was released, alongside a saloon version called the Vauxhall Belmont.

The first significant Japanese-designed compact car in the UK was the 1981 Triumph Acclaim, a licensed version of the four-door Honda Ballade with a Honda-designed engine. The Acclaim was replaced in 1984 by the Rover 200. In late 1985 the Peugeot 309 became the first Peugeot to be built in the UK at the Ryton plant.

==== 1990s ====
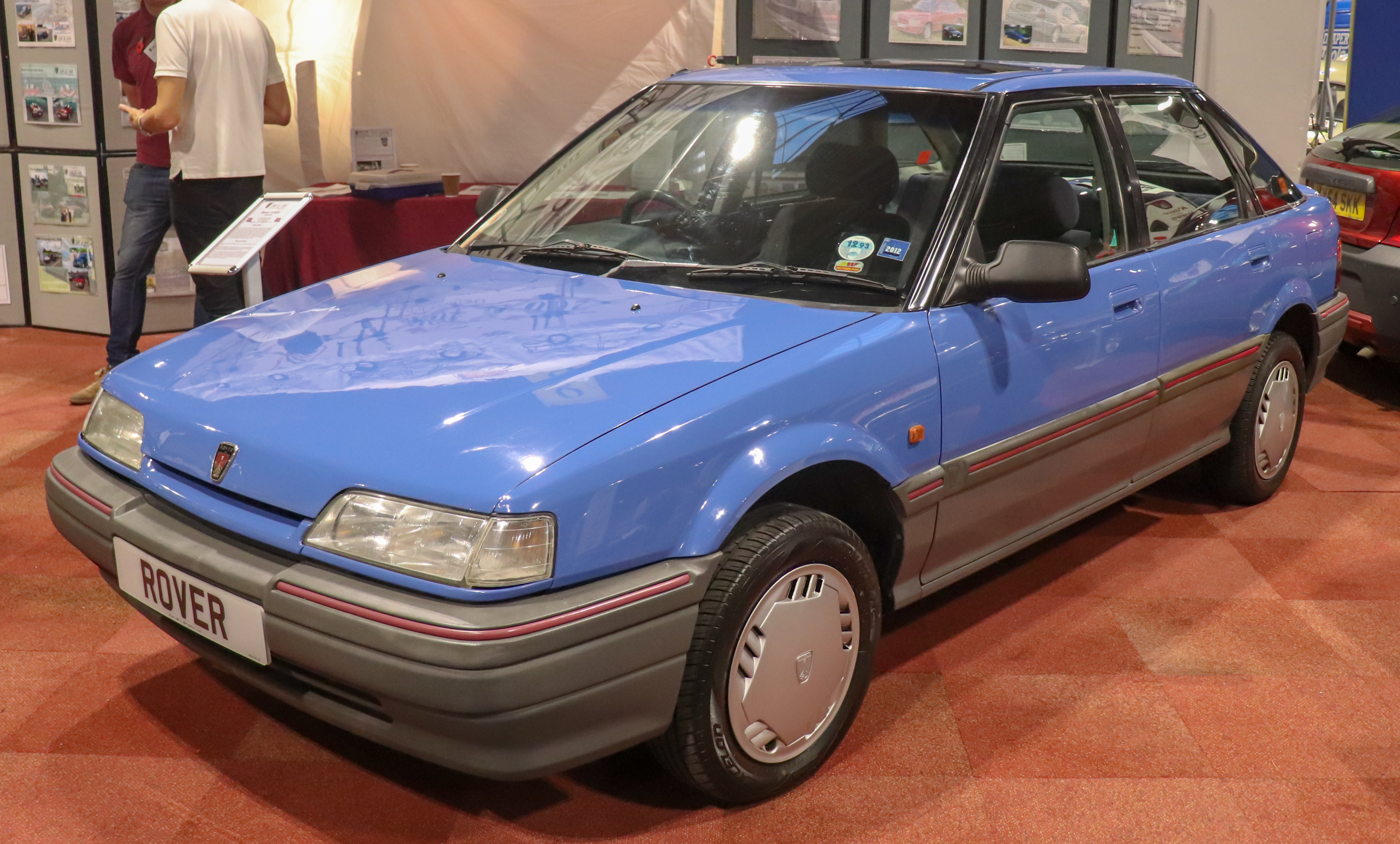
Rover 200 Mk2 (1989–1995)

VW Group introduced C-segment cars sharing various generations of its Volkswagen Group A platform under the Volkswagen, SEAT, Audi and Škoda brands.

Ford began the 1990s by replacing its 10-year-old Escort (and the Orion saloon version) with the Ford Escort MkV. In 1998, the European version of the Escort was replaced by the global Ford Focus MkI model.

General Motors released the Vauxhall Astra Mk3 update in 1991 and the all-new Astra Mk4 in 1998.

Rover Group introduced the Rover 200 Mk2 in 1989. The Rover 200 Mk3 was introduced in 1995, replacing the Honda Concerto-based Mk2 with a UK-designed car.

==== 2000s ====
The Ford Focus and Vauxhall Astra continued to lead the market into the new decade. A second-generation Focus arrived in 2004, the same year as the fifth-generation Astra, while Volkswagen launched the fifth-generation Golf in 2003. Across Europe as a whole, the Golf, Astra, and Focus were the three best-selling cars of 2005, with 469,248, 453,000, and 410,466 units sold respectively. Premium marques expanded further into the segment during the decade, with BMW launching the 1 Series in 2004 to sit alongside the Audi A3 and Mercedes-Benz A-Class.

A longer-term challenge to the segment emerged in 2007, when Nissan launched the British-built Nissan Qashqai. Sized similarly to a C-segment hatchback but styled as a crossover, the Qashqai did not immediately displace hatchbacks in sales but created the modern compact crossover segment that would erode C-segment hatchback sales over the following two decades.

==== 2010s ====
The Golf, Focus, and Astra remained Britain's most popular cars for much of the decade, with the seventh-generation Golf launched in 2012. In January 2016, the Nissan Qashqai outsold the Focus, Golf, and Astra for the first time, becoming the UK's best-selling car for that month and marking the first time a crossover had topped the monthly new car registrations chart. C-segment hatchback sales continued to lose ground for the rest of the decade as manufacturers expanded their crossover ranges; the Volkswagen Tiguan, launched in 2007, had itself overtaken the Golf as Volkswagen's best-selling model worldwide by the decade's end.

==== 2020s ====
The shift away from C-segment hatchbacks accelerated sharply. Ford discontinued the Mondeo in 2022 and the Fiesta in 2023 as part of a wider move toward electric SUVs, before ending production of the Focus on 14 November 2025 after 27 years and around 12 million sales worldwide. The Focus was effectively replaced in Ford's European lineup by the Explorer and Capri, both electric crossovers. The Volkswagen Golf reached its eighth generation in 2020, with a facelift in 2024, while Volkswagen introduced a dedicated electric hatchback, the Volkswagen ID.3, the same year.

By the middle of the decade, SUVs and crossovers had come to dominate the UK sales charts entirely: the Nissan Qashqai was the UK's best-selling car in 2022, before being overtaken by the Ford Puma, a subcompact crossover, which held the top spot in 2024 and 2025. By 2024, the top five best-selling cars in the UK were all SUVs or crossovers, illustrating the scale of the C-segment's decline in what had long been its core market.

== North America ==
In the United States and Canada, the C-segment is generally known as the "compact car" class, one tier below the mid-size "family car" segment. The segment was historically anchored by models such as the Honda Civic, Toyota Corolla, Ford Focus, and Chevrolet Cruze, and as of 2019 accounted for roughly 9% of new vehicle sales in the United States, then the largest single passenger-car segment in the market.

Detroit's manufacturers largely withdrew from the segment during the late 2010s as part of a broader shift toward SUVs and pickup trucks. Ford announced in 2018 that it would discontinue nearly all of its North American passenger cars, ending sales of the Focus and B-segment Fiesta by 2019 and the D-segment Fusion by 2020. General Motors similarly ended production of the Chevrolet Cruze in the United States in 2019, and discontinued the nameplate worldwide by 2023, replacing it in its lineup with the Chevrolet Equinox crossover; General Motors has not offered a mainstream C-segment sedan or hatchback since. An industry study found that only around 40% of former Focus and Cruze owners stayed with their original brand after the discontinuations, with many switching to Japanese and Korean C-segment models such as the Honda Civic, Toyota Corolla, and Hyundai Elantra, which continued to be sold and updated in North America.

== Asia ==
=== China ===
China is the world's largest car market, and its compact car (紧凑型车) segment has historically been dominated by foreign brands selling models built specifically for the domestic market, including the Volkswagen Lavida, Volkswagen Sagitar, Nissan Sylphy, and Toyota Corolla. This segment has been rapidly reshaped by the shift to new energy vehicles (NEVs), which reached a 54% share of the overall Chinese passenger car market in 2025, up from 48% in 2024. Domestic compact NEVs such as the BYD Qin Plus and Qin L, positioned directly against the Sylphy, Lavida, and Corolla, have taken an increasing share of the segment.

=== Japan ===
In Japan, models equivalent to the C-segment, such as the Toyota Corolla and Honda Civic, compete in a market structured differently from Europe or North America. Kei cars accounted for roughly 38% of new passenger car sales in 2025. Compact multi-purpose vehicles such as the Toyota Sienta have also drawn buyers away from traditional C-segment sedans; industry commentary has described the segment occupied by the Corolla as being "squeezed from both sides" by kei cars and MPVs. Globally, however, the Corolla and Civic remain closely matched as two of the best-selling nameplates in the segment's history, with worldwide sales of the two were separated by just over a thousand units in the first half of 2026.

== See also ==
- B-segment
- D-segment
- Euro Car Segment
- Car classification
- Compact car
