= Zhiguli (car brand) =

Designation of cars

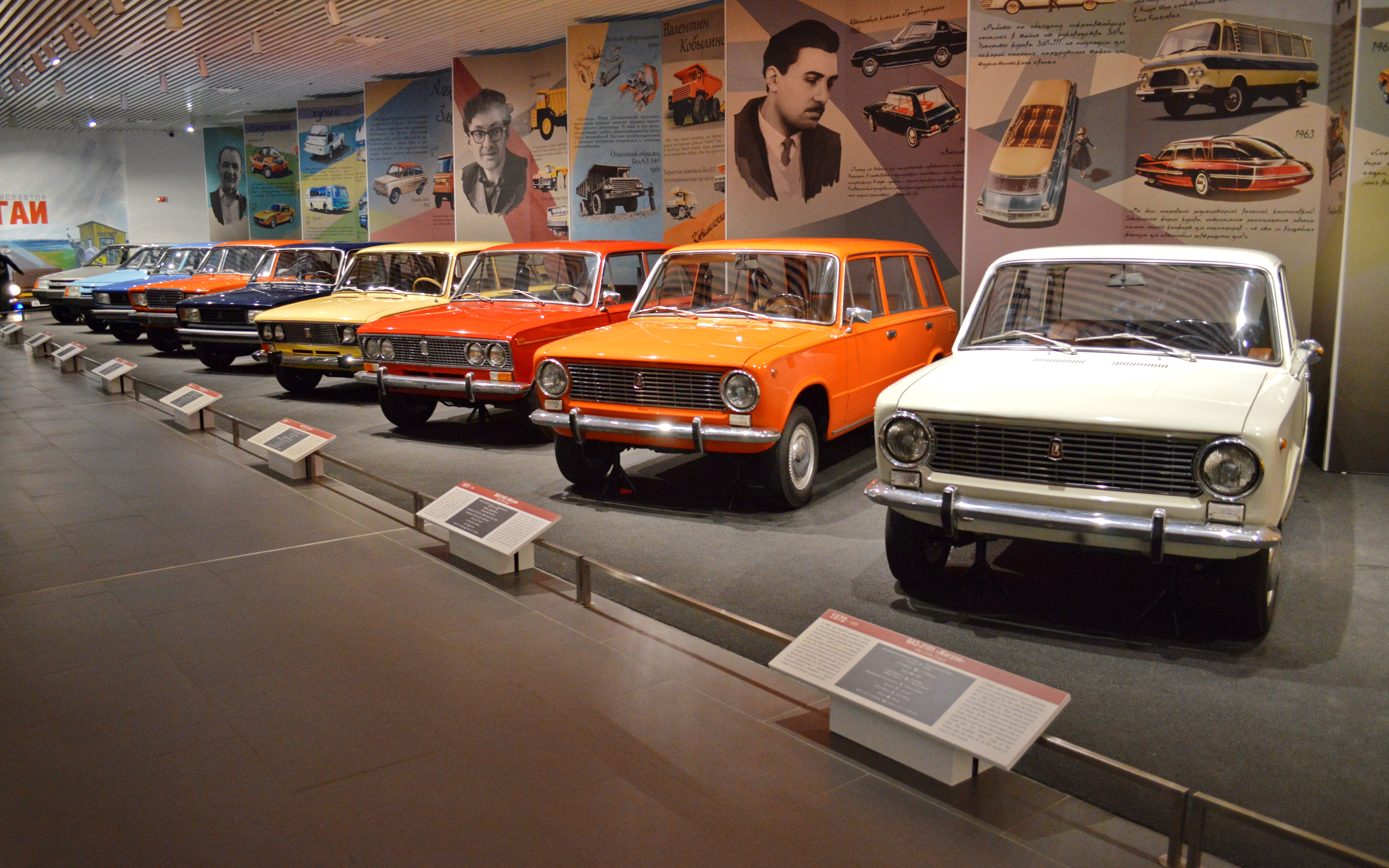
Zhiguli brand models.

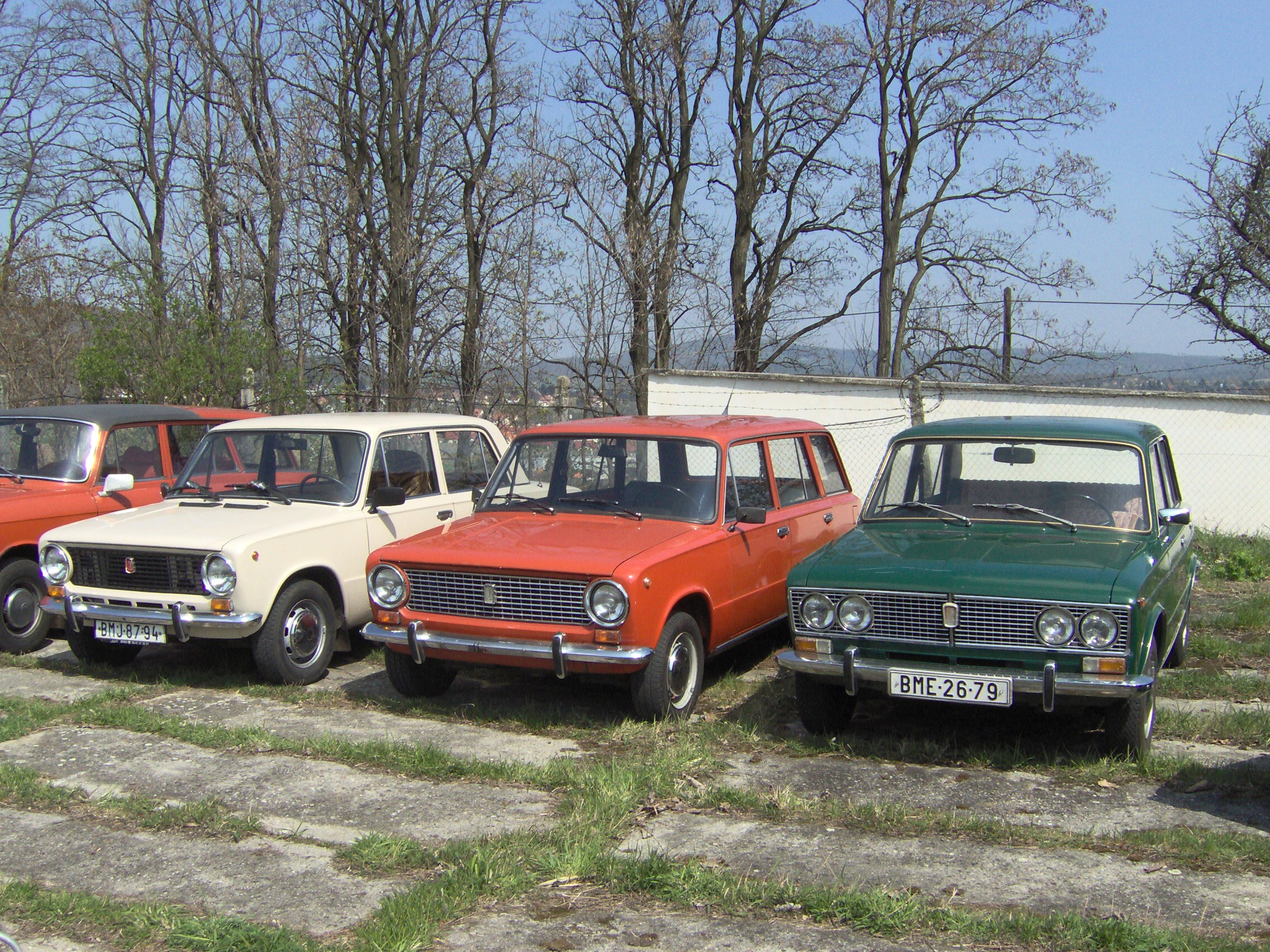
Early models (left to right): VAZ-2101 (1970), VAZ-2102 (1971) and VAZ-2103 (1972)

Zhiguli (Russian: Жигули, IPA: [ʐɨɡʊˈlʲi]) was a designation of cars based on the Fiat 124 manufactured in Russia and the Soviet Union by AvtoVAZ (formerly VAZ) from 1970 to 2012 and somewhat longer in some places abroad. For the majority of export markets however the cars were sold under the Lada brand.

The car was also manufactured in Ukraine and in Egypt. In Egypt the last car of this model was manufactured in 2014.

The designation is named after the Zhiguli Mountains by the Volga River, to match the name of the plant ('VAZ' stands for "Volzhsky Avtomobilny Zavod" or "Volga Automobile Plant").

There have been 7 models of this designation: VAZ-2101, VAZ-2102, VAZ-2103, VAZ-2104, VAZ-2105, VAZ-2106, VAZ-2107, with modifications indicated by an extra digit, see List of AvtoVAZ vehicles. The longest-living model was VAZ-2105 (1979–2010).

After the collapse of the Soviet Union in 1991, a shortage of used cars meant that many export Zhigulis badged as Ladas were re-imported back from the West and hence the Lada brand became well known in Russia and the former Soviet states. The designation name was officially abandoned by the plant in the mid-1990s as Zhiguli was similar to the word gigolo (Russian: жиголо, romanized: zhigolo), so AvtoVAZ now uses the Lada brand universally in all markets.
