= Automobile model numbering system in the Soviet Union and Russia =

A standardized automobile model numbering system has been used in the Soviet Union and Russia. Using the modern version of the system it is possible to determine a vehicle's type and engine capacity. The modern version of the numbering system was introduced in the mid-1970s. A similar system is used in the People's Republic of China.

== Old numbering system ==
The old numbering system was used from 1945 until the new system replaced it later (one model numbered by old system, LAZ-695N bus, is still produced).

According to the old system, the vehicle model consisted of the manufacturer's name and up to three digits. Each manufacturer received a range of numbers it used to pick model numbers. The ranges were assigned as follows:

Range	Factory	Sample Models
1 - 99	GAZ	GAZ-13, GAZ-14
100 - 199	ZIL	ZIL-130
200 - 299	YaAZ, KrAZ	YaAZ-200, KrAZ-255
300 - 399	UralAZ	Ural-375
400 - 450	MZMA (AZLK), IZh-Avto	Moskvitch 412
450 - 499	UAZ	UAZ-452, UAZ-469
500 - 599	MAZ, BelAZ	MAZ-500, BelAZ-540
600 - 649	KAZ	KAZ-608
650 - 699	buses - PAZ, LiAZ, LAZ	PAZ-652, LiAZ-677, LAZ-695
700 - 999	ErAZ, LuAZ, ZAZ, RAF, trailers	ErAZ-762, LuAZ-967, ZAZ-968, RAF-977

== Modern numbering system ==
The modern numbering system, documented as отраслевая нормаль (industry standard) ОН 025270-66, was first introduced in 1966 (but did not become effective immediately, so many vehicles that entered production before the mid-1970s still used the old numbering system; the first vehicle to use it was the all-new VAZ-2101, other plants switched to the new system later: Moskvitch - in 1976, Moskvitch 2140; GAZ - in 1982, GAZ-3102; and so on) and is still used in Russia, although not strictly adhered to by the manufacturers.

According to this system the full model designation is a combination of the manufacturer's name (e.g. VAZ) and at least 4-digit number (e.g. 2108):

<Plant name or abbreviation>—abcd,

in which:

- а — vehicle class;

For passenger cars the engine displacement and dry weight are used to determine the class, also sub-classes (Groups) are defined:

First digit	Class	Group	Displacement, cc	Dry weight, kg	Examples (including models indexed according to the old numbering system)
1	Extra small	I	< 849	< 649	ZAZ-965 Zaporozhets, VAZ-1111 Oka
1	Extra small	II	850 - 1099	650 - 799	Moskvitch 400, ZAZ-1102 Tavriya
2	Small	I	1100 - 1299	800 - 899	Moskvitch 402, VAZ-2101 Zhiguli
2	Small	II	1300 - 1499	900 - 1049	Moskvitch 408, VAZ-2103 Zhiguli
2	Small	III	1500 - 1799	1050 - 1149	Moskvitch 412, VAZ-2106 Zhiguli
3	Middle	I	1800 - 2499	1150 - 1299	GAZ-M20 Pobeda
3	Middle	II	2500 - 3499	1300 - 1499	GAZ-21 Volga, GAZ-3102 Volga
4	Large	I	3500 - 4999	1500 - 1899	GAZ-12 ZIM
4	Large	II	5000 +	1900 +	GAZ-13 Chaika
5	Upper	—	(non-regulated)	(non-regulated)	ZIL-111, ZIL-4104

For trucks, full weight is used:

First digit	Weight
1	< 1200 kg
2	1200 kg - 2000 kg
3	2000 kg - 8000 kg
4	8000 kg - 14000 kg
5	14000 kg - 20000 kg
6	20000 kg - 40000 kg
7	40000 kg +

For buses length is used:

First digit	Length
2	< 5 m
3	6 - 7.5 m
4	8 - 9.5 m
5	10.5 – 12 m
6	16 m +

- b — vehicle type;

Second digit	Type of vehicle
1	passenger car
2	bus
3	truck
4	semi-trailer truck
5	dump truck
6	tank truck
7	van
8	reserved
9	special vehicle

- c and d — factory model number.

The fifth digit is optional, and is used to specify different versions or modifications of the same model.

The sixth digit was sometimes used to specify export variants.

Also, several digits separated by dash were sometimes used to specify option packages.

The system had multiple drawbacks. For example, there were vehicles that could not be correctly indexed because their engine capacity and dry weight fell into different categories. This problem often appeared when extra low- or large-displacement modifications were created. Usually, these were indexed according to the index of the base model. For example, 5.5-liter V8-powered Volga GAZ-31011 was indexed so because its base model was 2,99-liter GAZ-3101; instead, it should have been indexed with "4" first digit according to its engine displacement. Moskvitch-214145 Svyatogor (based on Moskvitch 2141) was powered by 2.0-liter Renault F3R engine, so it fell into "Middle" class according to its engine displacement (more than 1800 cc), but into "Small" class according to its dry weight.

However, for most purposes, the system worked just fine for its time, mostly because new models were specifically created to fit into its classes and sub-classes, and extra low- or high-power modifications were quite rare.

This system usually was not used for export markets, where different indexes (usually directly based on engine displacement, like "Moskvitch 1500" for the car that was known domestically as Moskvitch 2140), or names (like "Moskvitch Aleko" for Moskvitch 2141) were in use. However, all exported models anyway had indexes based on the Soviet numbering system, which were used for documentation purposes.

By the late-Soviet period, model names were also used domestically along with standardized indexes, like - Lada Sputnik for VAZ-2108, VAZ-2109 and their modifications.

=== Examples ===
VAZ-21063: A vehicle produced by VAZ, with an engine capacity between 1200 cc and 1800 cc (2), which is a passenger vehicle (1), sixth model of the plant (06), this model's third modification (3).

GAZ-31029-51: A middle-class (3) passenger (1) vehicle produced by GAZ, with engine displacement between 1800 cc and 3500 cc, second model (02), ninth modification (9), with option package #51 factory installed (-51).

== Use by AvtoVAZ ==
Each AvtoVAZ model has an internal index that reflects the level of modifications, based on the engine and other options installed. For example, the VAZ-21103 variant has the 1.5 L 16V engine, while the VAZ-21104 uses the latest 1.6 L 16V fuel injection engine. Since 2001, trim levels are also indicated by including a number after the main index: '-00' means base trim level, '-01' means standard trim and '-02' designates deluxe version; for example, VAZ-21121-02 means Lada 112 hatchback with a 1.6L SOHC engine and deluxe trim.

The car's name is formed from 'VAZ-index model name. The classic Fiat 124-derived models were known on the domestic market as Zhiguli (Жигули) until the late-1990s, when the name was dropped; thus, the 2104-2107 range, as well as 110-series, actually lack a model name. The restyled Sputnik range was renamed Samara, but the Niva and the Oka retained their names. By the 2000s (decade), the VAZ designation was dropped from market names in favour of Lada and simplified export naming conventions were adopted, so VAZ-2104 effectively became Lada 2104, VAZ-2110 became Lada 110, VAZ-2114 became Lada Samara hatchback or Lada 114 and so on, though model indices continue to be used in both technical and marketing materials.

The model names varied from market to market and as such should not be used except to indicate a certain export market. Instead, it is advisable to refer solely to the model number as these are the same for all markets.

== Future of the system ==
The future of the standard is unclear. Some Russian auto manufacturers keep following it and others do not. AutoVAZ still loosely follows the standard, using it to internally identify model platforms. However, it did not adhere to the standard with its newer Lada Kalina models, dropping the required first digit "2" and numbering them as 1117, 1118 and 1119, despite having a 1.6 L engine.

== See also ==
- Automotive industry in the Soviet Union
