= VAZ-2101 =

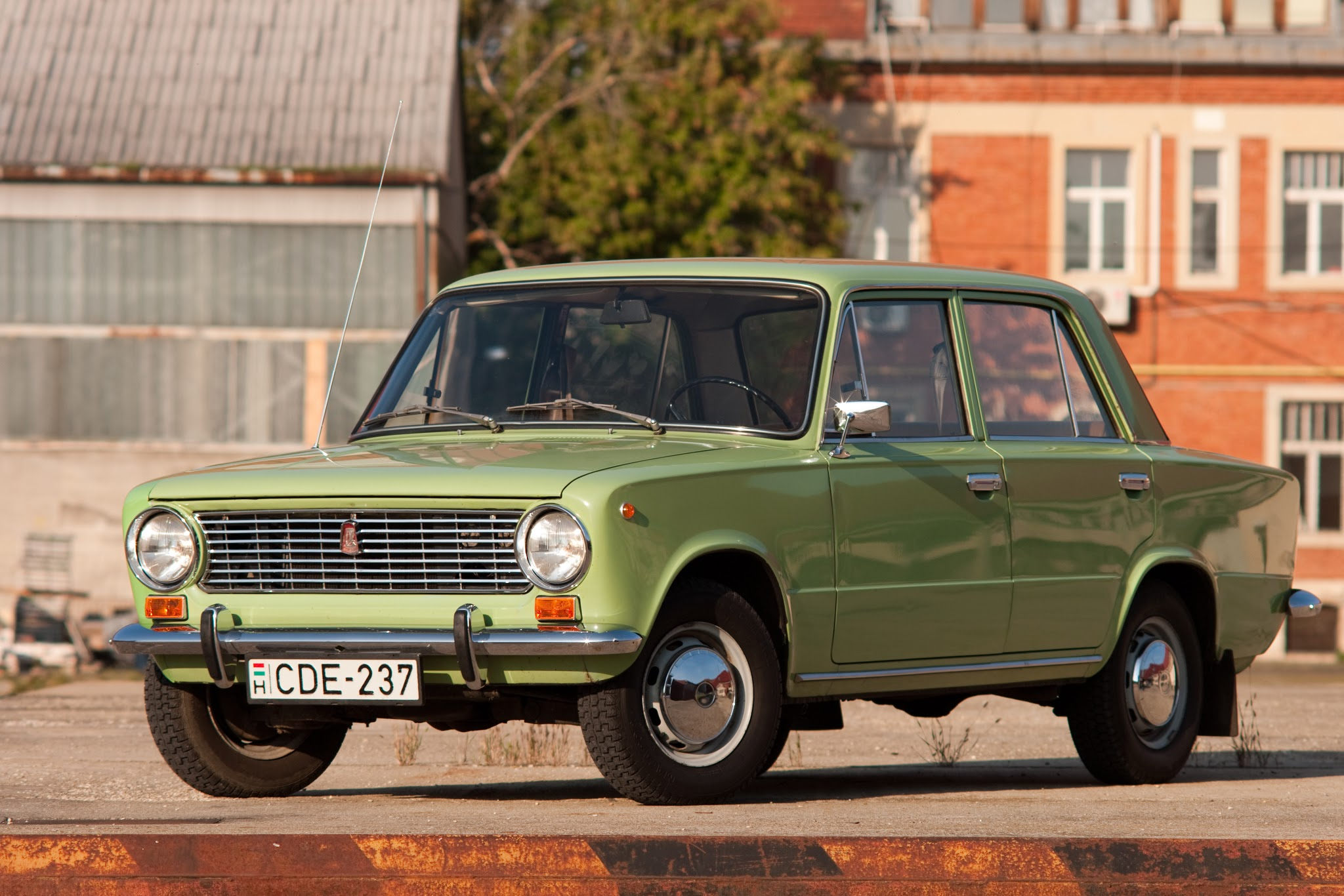

Overview
- Manufacturer: VAZ/AvtoVAZ
- Also called: Lada 1200/1200S; Lada 1300; Lada 2101; VAZ-2101
- Production: 1970–1988
- Assembly: Soviet Union: Tolyatti, Samara Oblast

Body and chassis
- Class: Compact car
- Body style: 4-door saloon; 5-door estate
- Layout: Front-engine, rear-wheel-drive
- Related: Fiat 124; SEAT 124; Murat 124; Premier 118NE; VAZ-2103; VAZ-2106; VAZ-2107

Powertrain
- Engine: petrol: 1.2 L VAZ-2101 I4; 1.3 L VAZ-21011 I4; 1.5 L VAZ-2103 I4
- Transmission: 4-speed manual 3-speed automatic

Dimensions
- Wheelbase: 2,424 mm (95.4 in)
- Length: 4,075 mm (160.4 in) (saloon); 4,060 mm (160 in) (estate)
- Width: 1,610 mm (63 in)
- Height: 1,382 mm (54.4 in)
- Curb weight: 955 kg (2,105 lb)

Chronology
- Successor: VAZ-2105; VAZ-2104

The VAZ-2101 "Zhiguli", commonly nicknamed "Kopeyka" (for the smallest Soviet coin, 1/100 of the Russian ruble), is a compact 4-door saloon or estate, called small class, passenger car, model 1 in Soviet classification, and produced by the Soviet manufacturer AvtoVAZ, introduced in 1970 as the company's first product.

The car is a licence-built version of the Fiat 124 that was heavily modified and tailored for the rough climate and road conditions across the Soviet Union and much of the Eastern Bloc countries. Subsequently, it was widely and successfully exported to the West under the Lada brand for over two decades. The station wagon version (correspondingly based on the Fiat 124 Familiare) was known as the VAZ-2102.

== Development ==
The lightweight Italian Fiat 124, which had won the 1967 European Car of the Year, was adapted in order to survive treacherous Russian driving conditions. Among many changes, aluminium brake drums were added to the rear, and the original Fiat engine was dropped in favour of a newer design made by NAMI. This new engine had a modern overhead camshaft design but was never used in Fiat cars. The suspension was raised to clear rough Russian roads and the bodyshell was made from thicker, heavier steel with reinforcement in key chassis areas after cracking was discovered during durability testing. The first Lada models were equipped with a starting handle in case the battery went flat in Siberian conditions, though this was later dropped. Another feature specifically intended to help out in cold conditions was a manual auxiliary fuel pump.

Some of the improvements developed by VAZ engineers in collaboration with their Italian counterparts were also applied by Fiat to the 124 in its final years of production - for example the chassis strengthening. Internally within Fiat, the car developed for VAZ was denoted "124R", the "R" standing for 'Russian'.

Engines fitted to the original Lada 2101 start with the 1.2l. The drivetrain is a simple rear-wheel drive setup with a live rear axle. The engine is an inline four with two valves per cylinder and a single overhead camshaft.

A special anti-freeze coolant fluid (Tosol A40) was developed, Russia's first, and Fiat had stipulated as part of the agreement with the Russians that a nationwide network of service stations would be established.

== History ==
The 2101 is a re-engineered version of the Fiat 124 produced under licence from Fiat and tailored for the nations of the Eastern Bloc, but was widely exported to the West as an economy car. Although the facelifted and modernised VAZ-2105, 2104 & 2107 versions largely replaced it in the West in the early 1980s, it was still produced for the domestic market as late as 1988. Known as the Zhiguli (for the hills found near the plant) within the Soviet Union, the main differences between the VAZ-2101 and the Fiat 124 are the use of thicker gauge steel for the bodyshell, drum brakes on the rear wheels in place of disc brakes, and a bespoke engine. Early versions of the car featured a starting handle for cranking the engine manually should the battery go flat in Siberian winter conditions, and an auxiliary fuel pump.

Compared to the Fiat 124, 800 modifications were made in all, including to rear brakes (discs to drums), suspension (for higher ground clearance), carburettor, and some other parts in order to satisfy a wide range of Russian climate conditions, as well as thicker-gauge steel (so the 2101 weighed 945 kg (2,083 lb), 90 kg (200 lb) more than the Fiat). All these models had soft suspension adapted to the local roads that provided a more comfortable ride on rough gravel roads. Early models included a crank, in case the battery went flat (an item later dropped) and an auxiliary fuel pump. However, the Togliatti plant could not supply the consumer demand, and people had to wait for years to get a chance to buy the car. Exports began 21 February 1971, to Yugoslavia, with 32 cars sent to Finland, Holland, and Belgium on 30 July. After a competition in the Soviet automotive magazine Za Rulyom (At the Wheel), which drew 1,812 entries, in September 1971 the name Lada was chosen, and the export models would be called Lada 1200s. Production was always behind demand, and price crept up, but by 1980, the wait for a new 2101 was down to a year. The 2102 estate version started production 27 April 1972. Sales to Cuba began in 1971 (and until 2006, Raúl Castro drove to work in his own saloon) and Canada in 1978, but none were exported to the U.S. Angola received its first one thousand Ladas in 1977, in time becoming a significant buyer.

Under the licensing agreement with Fiat, VAZ were forbidden from selling the car in Italy in order to protect Fiat's lucrative home market, nor was it permitted to sell it in any export market in competition with the 124; however, exports to Western Europe began as early as autumn 1971. The 2101 was exported under the Lada 1200, Lada 1300, Lada 1200S and Lada 2101 until 1989 and was positioned as a budget "no frills" offering; it was sold in the United Kingdom from May 1974, until the arrival of the Riva in 1983. It was the first Lada to be sold in the United Kingdom.

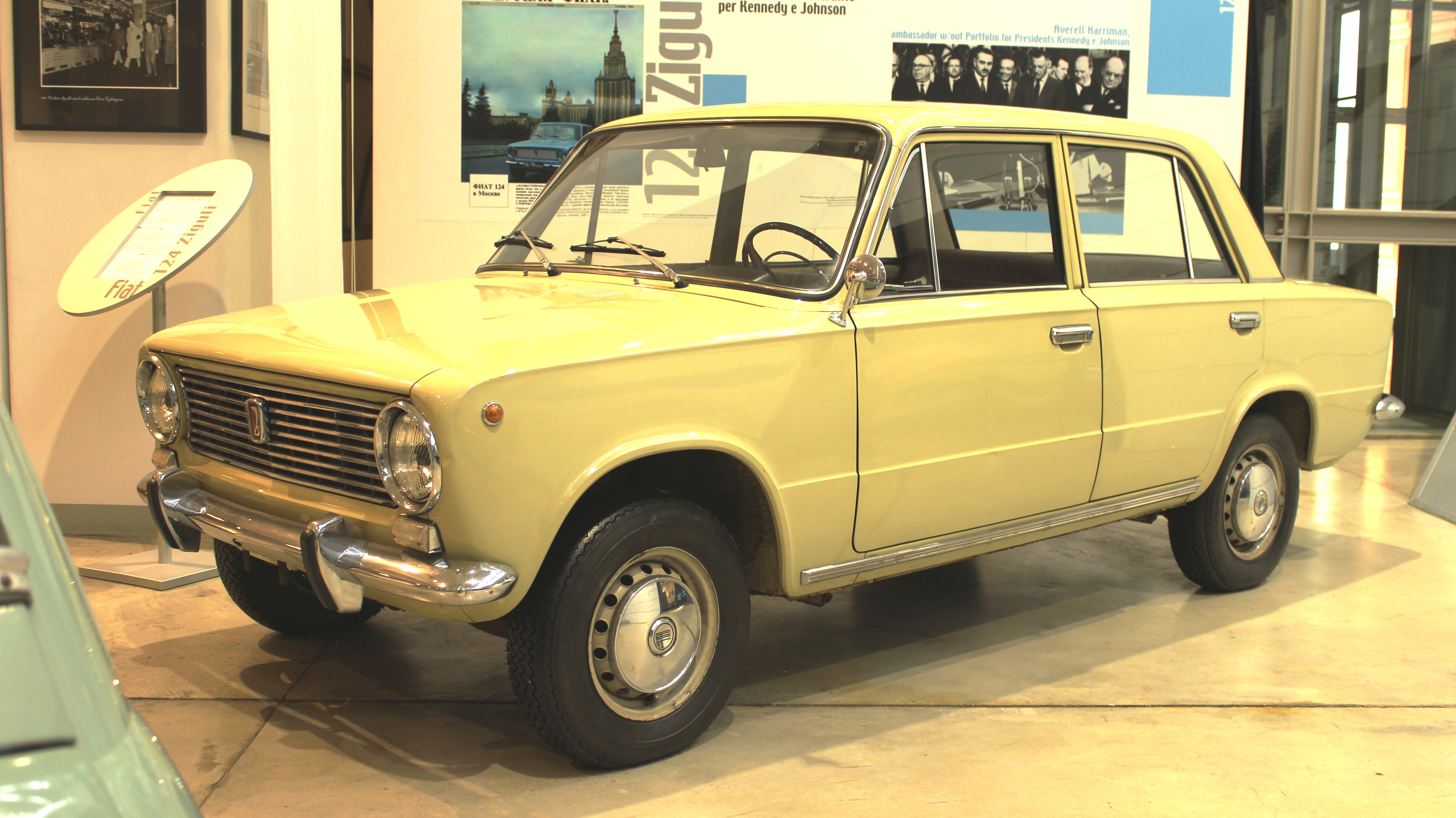
Lada 1200 at the Centro Storico Fiat in Turin

The first year, 22,000 were produced, and capacity reached 660,000 by 1973. Sales reached one million on 21 December 1973, and one and a half million in 1974. In May 1974, it went on sale in Britain, priced at £979.

The estate version of the VAZ-2101 (based on the Fiat 124 Familiare) was known as the 2102 and was available from 1971. It was replaced by the 2104 (Lada Riva in some markets) in 1985. Over 660,000 were built by end of production in 1986. In May 1974, it went on sale in Britain, priced at £979.

A flaw of the differently designed engine was that the crankshaft would wear too fast. Due to this, around 1980, this part was out of stock for quite a while. Only after two years the situation was resolved. The carburettors installed until around 1980 were of a higher quality than those used from then on.

The 2101 was built, virtually unaltered, from 1970 until 1982. The slightly upgraded 21013 continued to be built until 1988.

== Models ==
=== VAZ-2101 ===
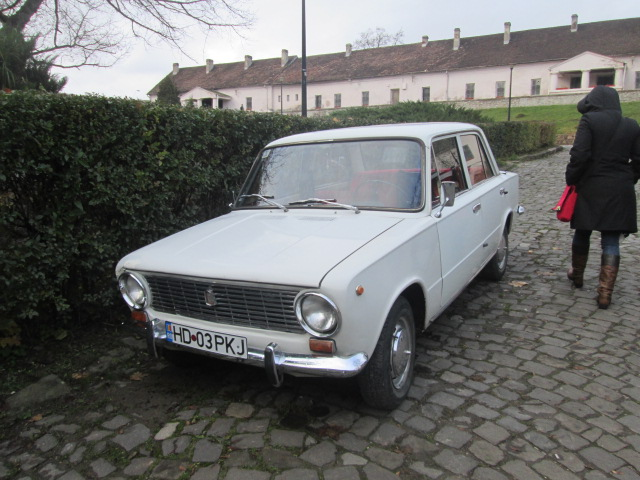
Lada 1200 in Hunedoara, Romania

Basic variants

- VAZ-2101 (April 1970 – 1983; export designation "Lada 1200") — initial production variant, which used the 1.2L (1,198 cc) VAZ-2101 engine (an overhead camshaft design, never used in a Fiat; same index as the car) producing 64 hp and offering a 140 km/h (87 mph) top speed and 0–100 km/h (0–62 mph) in about 20 seconds. Distinguished from the later 21011-bodied variants by its bumpers with overrider "fangs", different taillight arrangement, and the absence of the C-pillar interior air intake. Through the late 1970s and early 1980s, its production was winding down in favor of the new 21011-bodied variants. Badges: "Жигули" (sculpted chrome text without background) beneath the right taillight.
- VAZ-21011 (December 1974 – 1981/1983; export designation "Lada 1300") — upgraded variant with 69hp 1.3L (1,294 cc) VAZ-21011 engine. In addition to its engine, the VAZ-21011 used an updated body shell with numerous exterior and interior changes, including bumpers without overrider "fangs" and full-width rubber strip instead; revised taillight arrangement with reflectors relocated onto the main lenses instead of being separated units below them; reversing light relocated underneath the left taillight (originally it was hung below the bumper on a separate bracket); air intakes added on C-pillars for interior ventilation; front grille with more vertical slots (20 instead of 10) and slightly different VAZ logo shape; four air intake slots on the valance panel below the grille; and updated interior and dashboard with different controls. While the official Soviet sources claimed it was discontinued in 1981, some more recent sources, along with the records of surviving cars, confirm that its production lingered until at least 1983. Badges: "Lada 1300" (export, some domestic) or "Жигули 1300" (some domestic) beneath the left taillight.
- VAZ-21013 (1977–1988; export designation "Lada 1200S") — variant with 1.2L VAZ-2101 engine in VAZ-21011's upgraded body shell, retaining both the exterior and interior updates. Initially devised as a low-volume export variant for Western European markets, it entered the Soviet market and replaced the VAZ-2101/21011 from 1981–1982 onward. The VAZ-21013's production continued until late 1988, it was the cheapest VAZ model available after the base 2101 was discontinued. Badges: "Lada 1200S" beneath the left taillight, both on domestic and export cars.
- VAZ-21016 (1976–1981) — variant with 1.3L VAZ-21011 engine in VAZ-2101's earlier body shell, the opposite of the 21013. Built in small numbers, very little is documented about it, with no known history of export or domestic usage. Pre-2010s sources often conflate it with the VAZ-2101-94, the law enforcement-only variant of the VAZ-2101 with 1.5L VAZ-2103 engine; there is no verifiable evidence that the real 1.3L VAZ-21016 was preferred by the police or KGB/MVD more than the base 2101, 21011 or 2101-94 in any capacity.

Right-hand drive, limited production and specialised variants

- VAZ-21012 — right-hand drive variant of the base 1.2L VAZ-2101. Sold in the UK as "Lada 1200 Saloon" from May 1974 to October 1982.
- VAZ-21014 — right-hand drive variant of the 1.3L VAZ-21011. Sold in the UK as "Lada 1300 Saloon" from October 1977 to March 1980.
- VAZ-2101-94 (1973-1981) — variant with 1.5L VAZ-2103 engine (75hp) in the original VAZ-2101 body shell, available only for the police and KGB/MVD. This index surfaced in publicly available documentation only in the late 2000s, and some older sources mistakenly assumed that this variant is the VAZ-21016.
- VAZ-21018 (1978) — first series rotary engine variant of the VAZ-2101 series (with VAZ-21011 body shell), equipped with 70hp VAZ-311 Wankel engine with electronic ignition and twin-electrode sparking plugs.. Initially it was planned as a publicly available model, with the first batch of 51 cars built in late 1978 delivered undercover to the customers as test mules for the VAZ-311 engine. These trials failed, as through 1979, 49 out of 51 cars had their engines replaced with conventional units due to severe degradation of all components, rendering it unusable for service. First publicly demonstrated on the NTTM-82 exhibition in summer 1982, already after the end of the project.
- VAZ-21019 (1980) — upgraded rotary engine variant with twin-rotor 120hp VAZ-411 Wankel engine, already developed in secrecy, only for police and KGB/MVD service, after the failure of the VAZ-21018. One pilot batch built in April 1980, its further fate is unknown.

=== VAZ-2102 ===
Basic variants

- VAZ-2102 (September 1971–1986; export designation "Lada 1200 Combi") — base station wagon variant with 1.2L VAZ-2101 engine, the only variant to be available en masse in the USSR itself. Badges: "Жигули" (sculpted 2101-style originally, conventional rectangular badge from mid-1970s onward; domestic) or "Lada 1200 Combi" (export), on the right of the tailgate.
- VAZ-21021 (1978–1981; export designation "Lada 1300 Combi") — export variant with 1.3L VAZ-21011 engine. The original VAZ-21021 prototype featured the "fangless" bumpers and revised interior of the VAZ-21011, but the production variant was a basic engine swap instead. Restricted to a small number of Western European markets and never available domestically, it was built in small numbers (compared to the base 2102 and the 21023) and little is documented about it.
- VAZ-21023 (1977–1986; export designation "Lada 1500 Combi") — export variant with 1.5L VAZ-2103 engine, as well as dashboard and seats of the VAZ-2103; exterior design unchanged. Exported into many Western European markets to serve as the estate counterpart of the VAZ-2103 (despite still retaining the 2101 front clip), but never available domestically, with re-export specimen being highly sought after.

Right-hand drive, limited production and specialised variants

- VAZ-21022 — right-hand drive variant of the base 1.2L VAZ-2102. Sold in the UK as "Lada 1200 Estate" from May 1974 to October 1985.
- VAZ-21024 — planned right-hand drive variant of the 1.3L VAZ-21021. Never sold in the UK, presumably never entered production.
- VAZ-21026 — right-hand drive variant of the 1.5L VAZ-21023. Sold in the UK as "Lada 1500 Estate" from October 1977 to October 1985.
- VAZ-21029/VAZ-2801 — electric three-door panel van derivative of the VAZ-2102. After being trialed through 1975 as VAZ-21029, a small series of 47 vehicles, now standardised as VAZ-2801, was built in 1980-1981 and used as delivery vehicles in various factories around the USSR. The VAZ-2801 was powered by 380kg nickel–zinc batteries with capacity of 125 A⋅h and output of 25 kW, positioned in the rear compartment; it had a payload of 240kg, top speed of 60 km/h and range of 80 km.

=== VAZ-2103 ===
The 2103 (known in export markets as the Lada 1500) was very similar to the 2101, and had many common features with the Fiat 124 Special that was developed at the same time as the 2103, but with an external trim closer to the larger and more upmarket Fiat 125. It can be identified by four headlights, a squarer appearance to the front grille, and a different interior. It was succeeded by the similar VAZ-2106, or Lada 1600.

== Technical specifications ==
Type	VAZ-2101	VAZ-21011
Mass, dry	890 kg (1,962 lb)	
Mass, roadworthy	945 kg (2,083 lb)	1,010 kg (2,227 lb)
Max. permissible mass	1,345 kg (2,965 lb)	1,400 kg (3,086 lb)
Length	4,073 mm (160.4 in)	
Width	1,611 mm (63.4 in)	
Height	1,440 mm (56.7 in)	
Wheelbase	2,424 mm (95.4 in)	
Track width (front)	1,349 mm (53.1 in)	
Track width (rear)	1,305 mm (51.4 in)	
Ground clearance (fully laden)	170 mm (6.7 in)	
Turning radius	5.6 m (18.4 ft)	
Ramp angle (front)	36 °	
Ramp angle (rear	17 °	
Tyres	114-330 mm (4½-13 in)	
Engine code	VAZ-2101	VAZ-21011
Engine type	Water-cooled, straight-four, Otto, counterflow cylinder head, duplex-chain driven overhead camshaft	
Fuel system	Two-stage downdraught carburetter type 2101-1107010-02	
Displacement	1198 cm^{3}	1294 cm^{3}
Bore × Stroke	76 mm × 66 mm	79 mm × 66 mm
Compression $\varepsilon$	8.5	8.8
Rated power (GOST–14846)	46 kW (63 PS) at 5600 min^{−1}	51 kW (69 PS) at 5600 min^{−1}
Rated power (DIN 70020)	44 kW (60 PS) at 5600 min^{−1}	48 kW (65 PS) at 5600 min^{−1}
Rated power (SAE J1349)	48 kW (65 PS) at 5600 min^{−1}	
Max. torque (GOST–14846)	87 N⋅m (64 lb⋅ft) at 3400 min^{−1}	93 N⋅m (69 lb⋅ft) at 3400 min^{−1}
Fuel type	Petrol; AI-93 GOST 2084-67	
Top speed	140 km/h (87 mph)	145 km/h (90 mph)
Acceleration 0–100 km/h (62 mph)	22 s	18 s
Stopping distance (at 80 km/h)	38 m (124.7 ft)	
Fuel consumption (combined, l/100 km)	8.0 L	9.0 L
Gradeability (1st gear)	34 %	
Fuel tank volume	39 l	
Source		

== Gallery ==
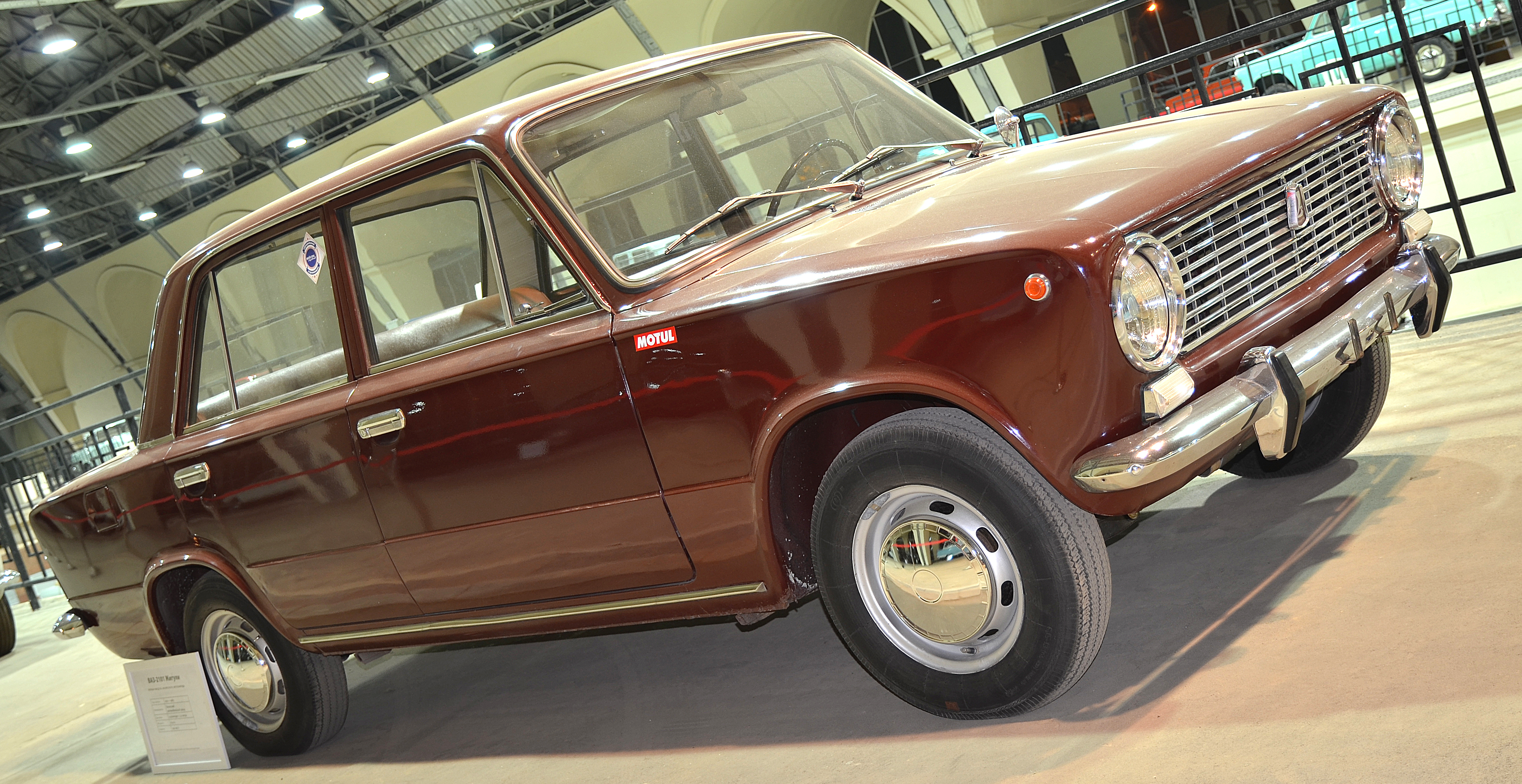
VAZ-2101 (Lada Zhiguli 1200)

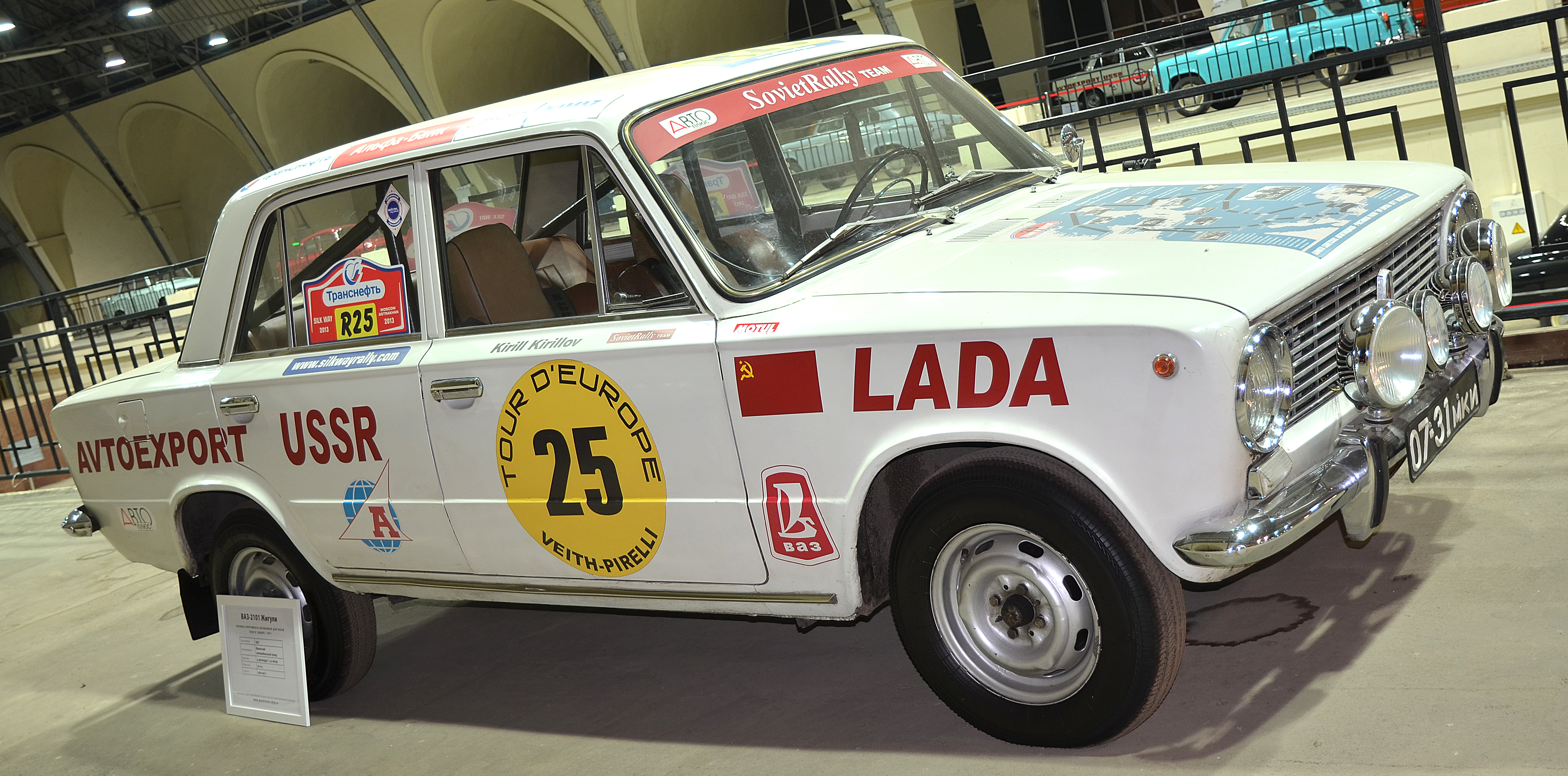
Rally car

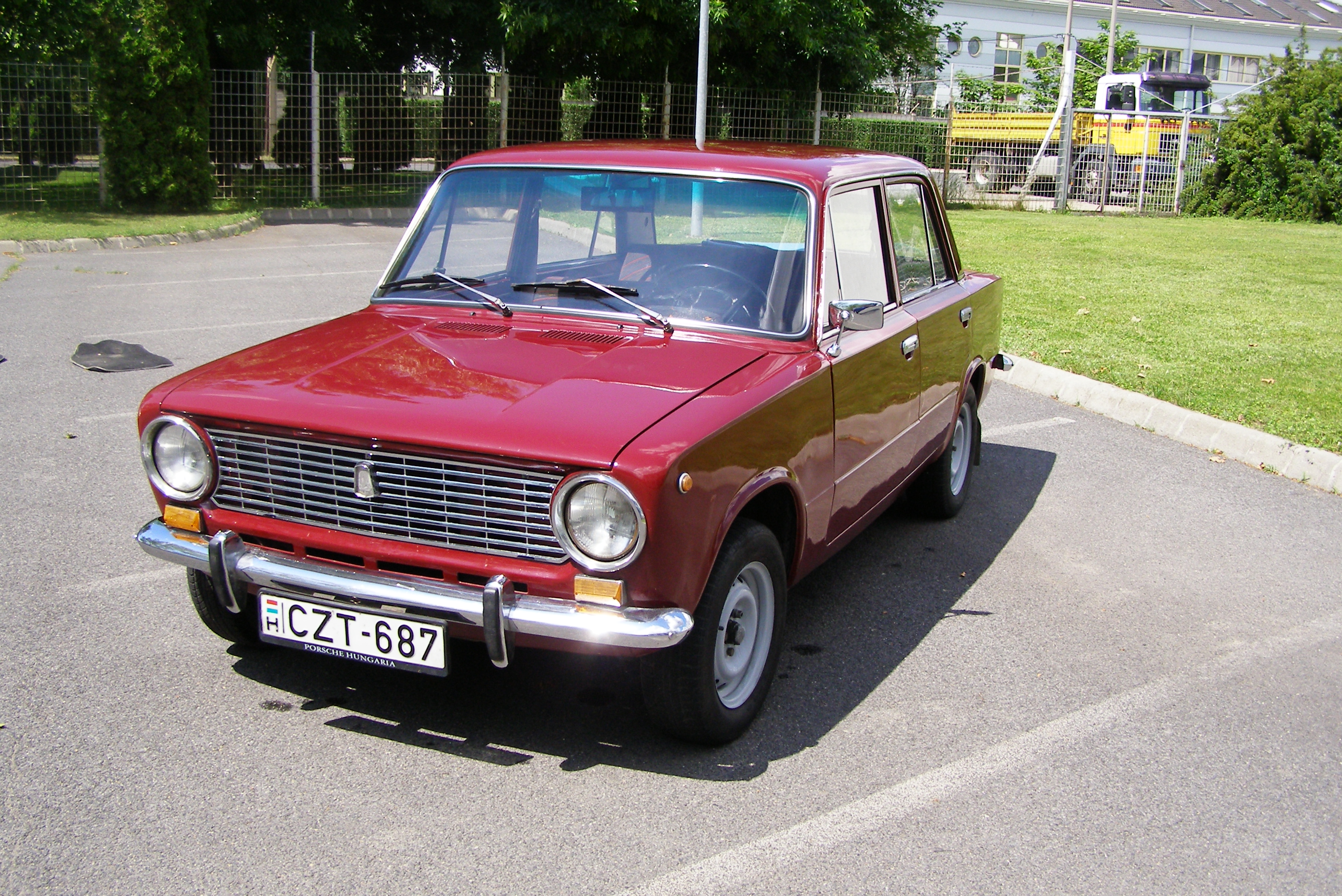
Lada (Zhiguli) 1200, manufactured in 1975

VAZ-2102 (Lada 2102 Estate)

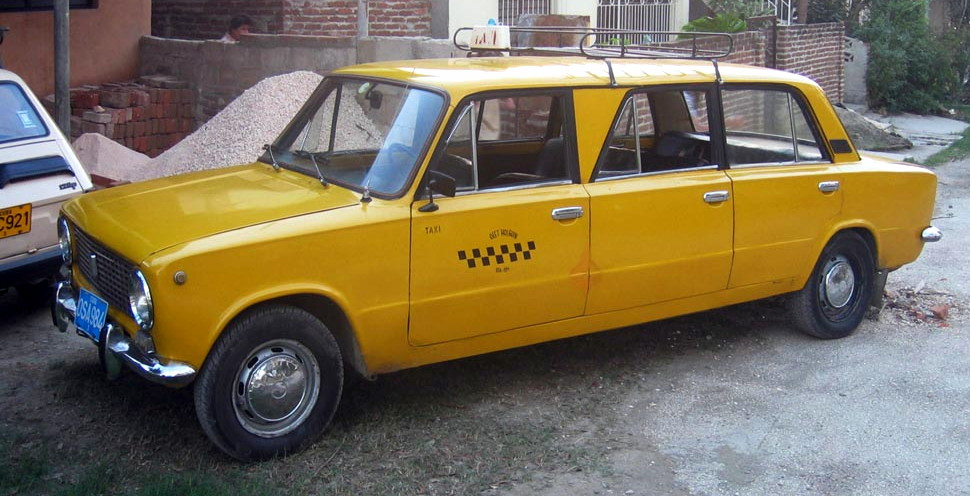
VAZ-2101 modified into a taxi limousine, in Trinidad, Cuba

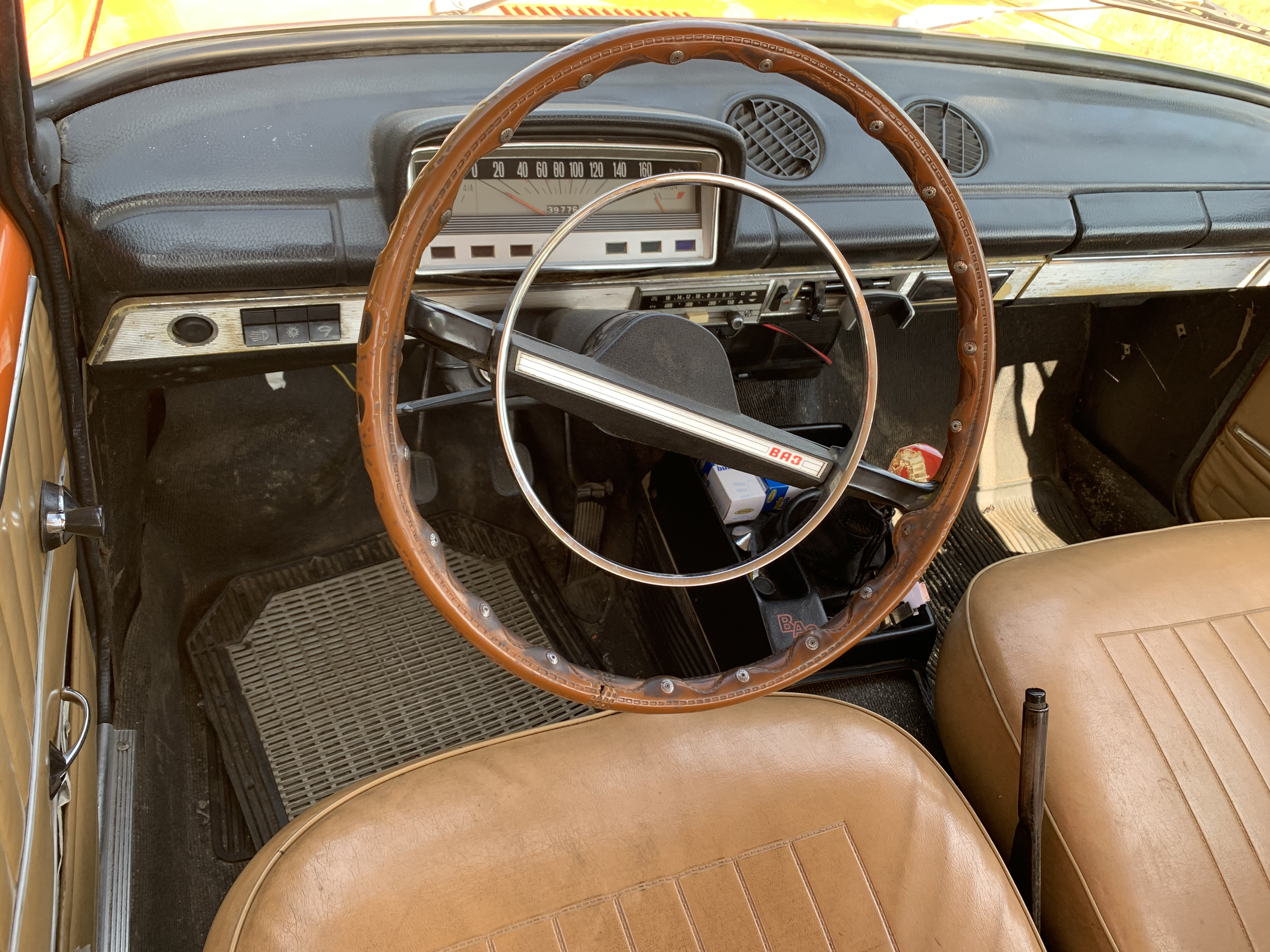
Zhiguli 2021 interior, Grimsthorpe Castle

== See also ==
- Lada
- Vauxhall Viva HA
