= VAZ-2103 =

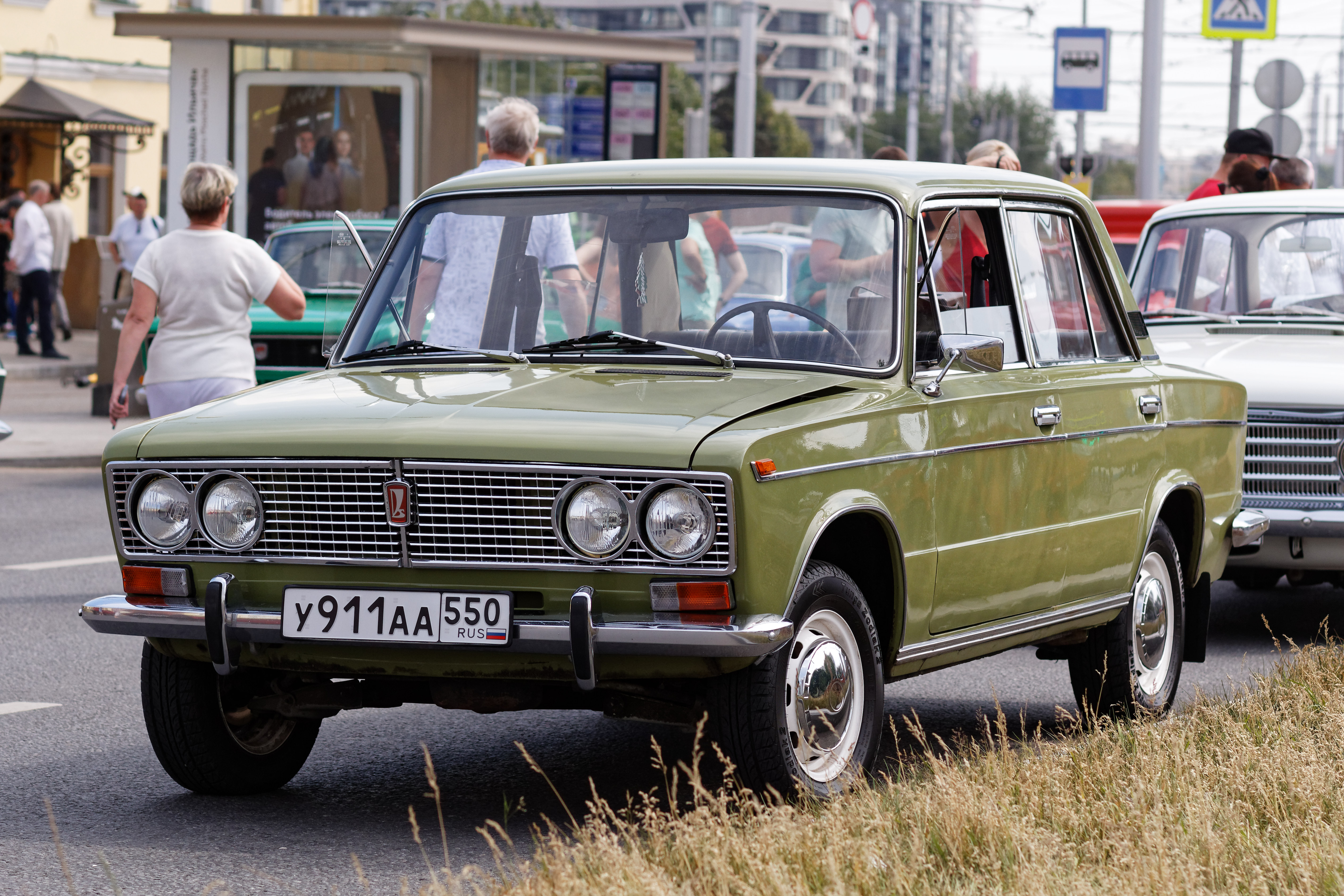

Overview
- Manufacturer: AvtoVAZ
- Also called: Lada 1200; Lada 1300; Lada 1500
- Production: 1972–1984
- Assembly: Soviet Union: Tolyatti, Samara Oblast

Body and chassis
- Class: Small family car
- Body style: 4-door saloon
- Layout: Front-engine, rear-wheel-drive
- Related: Fiat 124 Special; SEAT 1430

Powertrain
- Engine: 1198 cc VAZ-2101 I4; 1294 cc VAZ-21011 I4; 1452 cc VAZ-2103 I4; 1568 cc VAZ-2106 I4
- Transmission: 4-speed manual

Dimensions
- Wheelbase: 2,424 mm (95.4 in)
- Length: 4,115 mm (162.0 in)
- Width: 1,610 mm (63 in)
- Height: 1,446 mm (56.9 in)
- Kerb weight: 1,030 kg (2,271 lb)

Chronology
- Successor: VAZ-2106

The VAZ-2103 Zhiguli is a deluxe compact saloon (model 3 in the Soviet classification), produced by AvtoVAZ, introduced in 1972 and produced until 1984. Better known by its export name Lada 1500 outside of its native Soviet Union and popularly nicknamed the Troika (Russian: Тройка, lit. 'three') in its domestic market. The car was developed jointly by VAZ and FIAT at the same time as Fiat 124 Special, and the two models had the same basis and influenced each other. The 2103 was built under license and tailored to the Soviet and Eastern European markets. The 2103 externally differs from its predecessor, the VAZ-2101. Firstly, by its four, that is, double sets of headlights, different grille and direction pointers, moldings on the sides of the body and larger taillights. Its main difference - the more powerful 75 hp (55 kW) 1,452 cc (88.6 cu in) straight-four petrol engine. In addition, this model is distinguished by the presence of a vacuum brake booster as well as self-adjusting rear brakes and internally on the new Fiat 125 based front panel. The interior was also more upmarket with a different steering wheel, cloth interior trim on export versions (in place of the VAZ-2101's vinyl) and an improved dashboard featuring wood imitation, tachometer, oil pressure gauge and front panel clock.

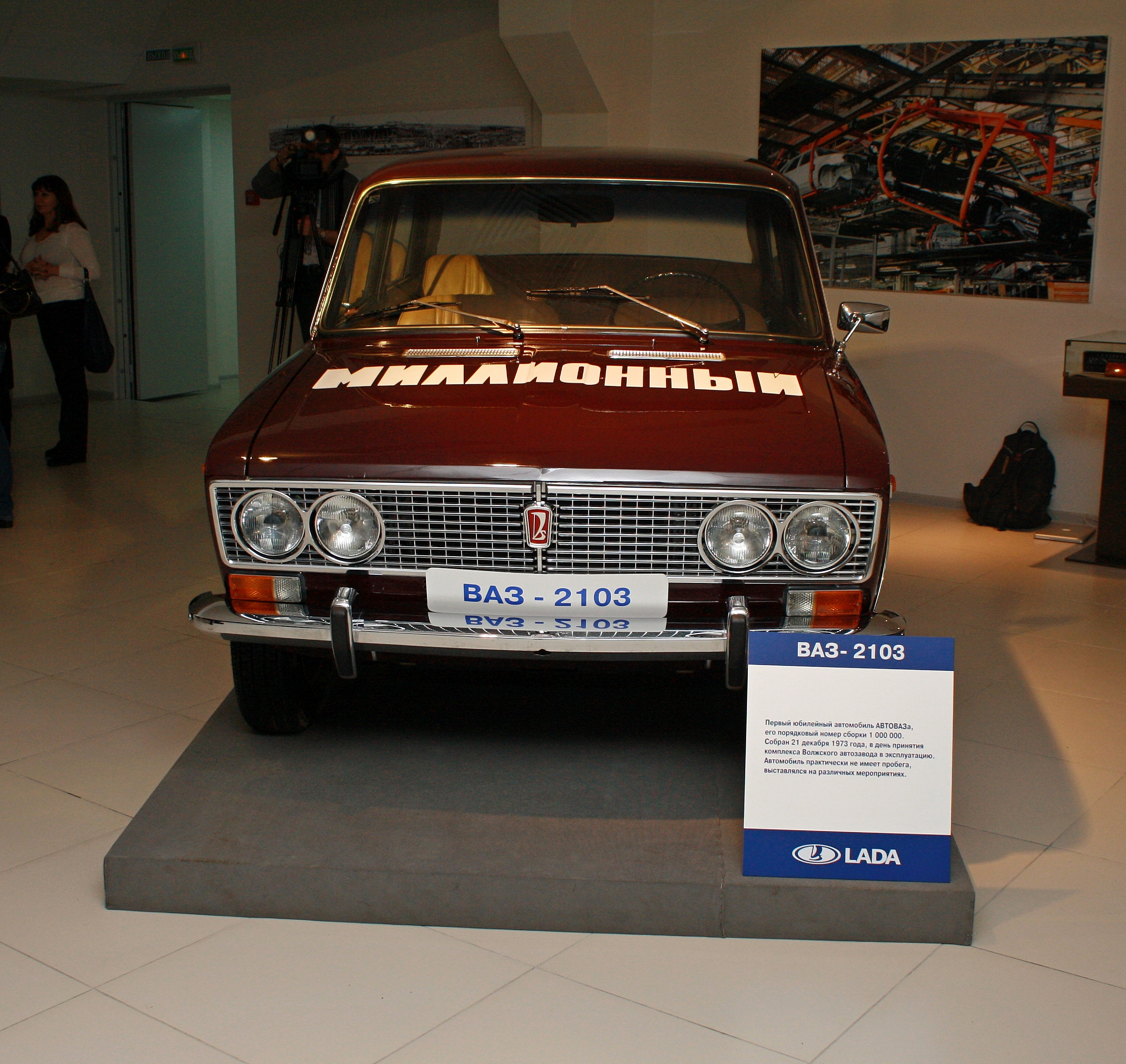
The one millionth AvtoVAZ car, built on 21 December 1973

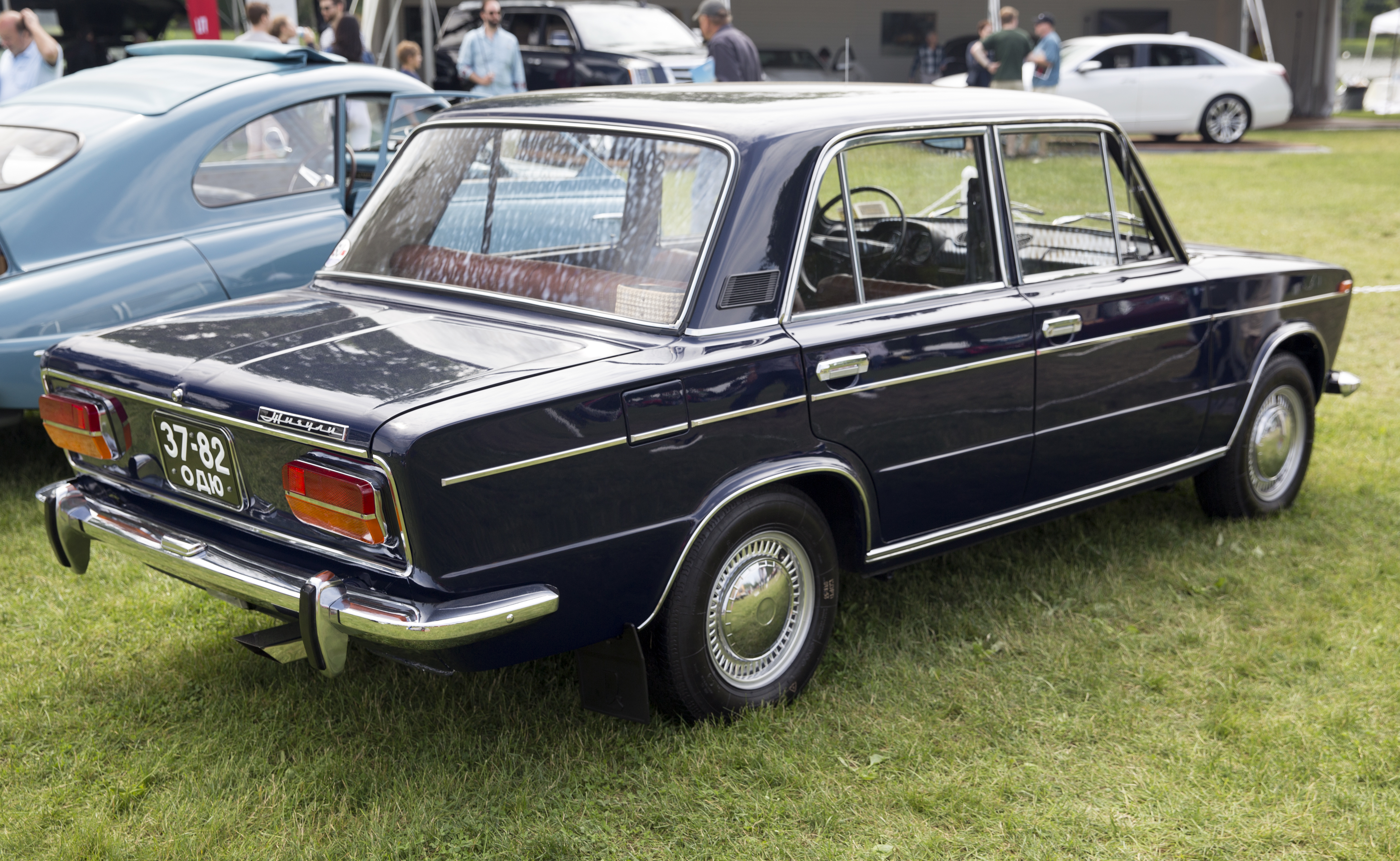
VAZ-21033 (1300 cc engine)

== History ==
Known as the Zhiguli within the Soviet Union, the main differences between the VAZ-2103 and the Fiat 124 Special are the use of thicker-gauge steel for the bodyshell (so the 2103 weighed 1,030 kg (2,270 lb), the Fiat 105 kg (231 lb) less), an overhead camshaft engine (in place of the original Fiat OHV unit), and the use of aluminium drum brakes on the rear wheels in place of disc brakes. The car featured a starting handle for cranking the engine manually should the battery go flat in Siberian winter conditions, an auxiliary fuel pump and improved soundproofing. It was later joined by the 1,198 cc (73.1 cu in)-powered 21035 and the 1,294 cc (79.0 cu in) (VAZ 21011-engined) 21033. Compared to the Fiat 124 Special, modifications were done to the suspension, carburetor, and some other parts in order to satisfy the wide range of Russian climate conditions. All of these models were adapted to local roads and had a suspension able to provide a comfortable ride, even on tough gravel roads. This Lada was a hit in the Soviet Union. The more expensive VAZ-2103 was considered a prestigious model and was very popular among Soviet white-collar workers. Unfortunately, the Tolyatti plant where Lada was produced could not keep up with consumer demand and people had to wait for years to get the chance to buy a car.

VAZ was forbidden from selling the car in competing markets alongside the Fiat 124; however, exports to Western European nations began in 1974 when the 124 was discontinued in favour of Fiat's newer 131 Mirafiori model. The VAZ-2103 was sold in export markets from the mid-1970s to early 1980 essentially as a "de luxe" version of the VAZ-2101. In the United Kingdom, it was sold from May 1976 until May 1979 and it was the second Lada car to be sold in this market. Although starting to be slowly replaced with its successor, the VAZ-2106 already from 1976, it remained in production until 1984. It was the first VAZ model to be discontinued, despite not being the oldest one. This was mainly due to the complexity of production and the expense of its chrome plated elements, both of which were severely reduced in VAZ-2106.

Reviewers from the French L'Auto-Journal called it "an extremely serious working instrument, able to operate in the worst conditions" and "a well-made car capable of being serviced anywhere, even by its owner".

== Models ==
Basic variants

- VAZ-2103 (December 1972–1984; export designation "Lada 1500") — base model 4-door saloon/sedan equipped with straight-four 1.5L (1,452cc) engine VAZ-2103 (same index as the car), producing 75 hp. Badges: "Lada 1500" (export) or "Жигули" (domestic), on the right side of the trunk lid.
- VAZ-21033 (1977–1984; export designation "Lada 1300S") — variant with 1.3L (1,294cc) VAZ-21011 engine (69hp). Initially an export variant for Western European markets, it entered the Soviet market around 1981–1982 as a small-scale cheaper alternative. Badges: "Lada 1300S (export) or "Жигули" (domestic), on the right side of the trunk lid.
- VAZ-21035 (claimed years 1973–1981) — potential variant with 1.2L (1,198cc) VAZ-2101 engine (64hp). The VAZ-21035 is very poorly documented, with no evidence of any degree of series production. Despite occasional claims of its export presence in Western Europe (under inconsistent indices like "Lada 1200DL" or "Lada 1200SL"), it had never surfaced in any period advertisements or brochures, and no verified surviving cars are recorded in museums or private collections. The 21035's presence in Soviet records is similarly inconsistent, as some of the period documentation covering all VAZ-2103 variants mentions it, and some does not.

Right-hand drive, limited production and specialised variants

- VAZ-21032 — right-hand drive variant of the base 1.5L VAZ-2103. Sold in the UK as "Lada 1500 Saloon" from May 1976 to May 1979.
- VAZ-21036 — planned right-hand drive variant of the 1.3L VAZ-21033. Never sold in the UK, presumably never entered production.
- VAZ-21031 — due to development and political pressures, two cars used this designation. Originally, the car developed under this index was what is currently known as VAZ-2106, which received its current index in the end of 1975, so that it could be presented to the 25th Congress of the Communist Party of the Soviet Union in February 1976 as a brand new model rather than a VAZ-2103 variant. At the same time, in summer 1975, a small number of VAZ-2103s was refitted with the 1.6L VAZ-2106 as test mules for the upcoming model's engine; these cars were distributed to regular customers without any official announcements and were never acknowlegded in official paperwork, since the NIIAT registries already had the "official VAZ-21031" (the forthcoming VAZ-2106) filed under that number.
- VAZ-2103V ("vremenniy", temporary) — ersatz configuration of the first few hundreds of VAZ-2103s with interior components of the VAZ-2101 (1.5L engine left unchanged), built through 1972 and early 1973. Externally these cars were distinguished by the absence of the air intakes on the valance panel and vertically inverted positioning of the taillights (amber section on the top, red section on the bottom). This index was not registered in NIIAT and not acknowledged in official paperwork, since it was a temporary configuration caused by supply issues, not a properly developed variant.
- VAZ-2103 estate — planned station wagon derivative of the VAZ-2103, with three prototypes converted from VAZ-2102s in 1976. Never entered production and never received an official index. The VAZ-21023, which was a 1.5L variant of the regular VAZ-2102 with standard two-headlamp front clip that actually entered production for export markets, has no known relation to this project.
