= Za Rulem =

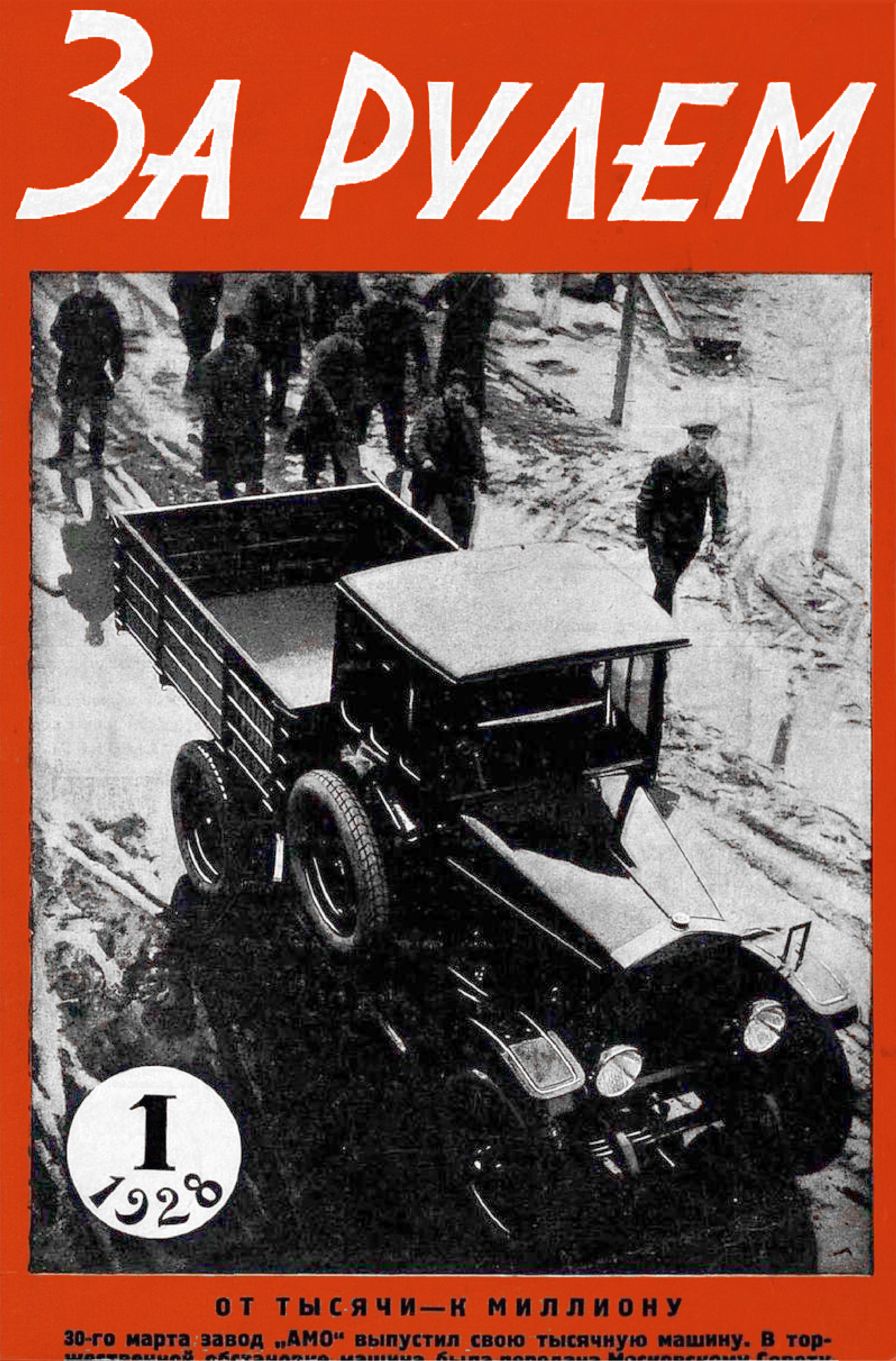
- First Issue of Za Rulem
- Editor: Maxim Kadakov
- Categories: Automobile magazine
- Frequency: Monthly
- Circulation: 460,000 / month (2010)
- First issue: 23 February 1928
- Company: Za Rulem publishing house
- Country: USSR; Russia
- Language: Russian
- Website: zr.ru
- ISSN: 0321-4249

Za Rulem (Russian: Behind the steering wheel) is a popular Russian monthly magazine about cars and the automotive industry. Before 1989, it was the only automobile periodical in the USSR, designed for a wide readership. By the end of 1980 the magazine's circulation reached 4.5 million copies.

== History and profile ==
Za Rulem was founded on 23 February 1928, and the first issue was published in April 1928.

Quote from the first issue :

We hope that our readers will not only narrow circles of specialists, but the broad masses of the working people, for the first time introduces the ideas of motorization. Our magazine is the first and only experience of mass edition of the popular magazine devoted to cars and roads

The circulation of the magazine in 1972 was 2.1 mln copies. In 1978, the magazine was awarded the Order of the Red Banner of Labour.

The following artists performed design work for the magazine: Boris Efimov and Alexander Zakharov (1976-1988). Vladimir Mayakovsky also worked for the magazine.

During Soviet times, the magazine was a 30-leaf notebook of simple matte paper, but in the 1990s, they began to add more pages. In May 2008, the magazine updated the typeface of the logo, the old style of the journal logo having been used since the 1970s.

Za Rulem is published by a publishing company of the same name on a monthly basis. In August 2009, the publisher created a new website. Since January 2010 the editor in chief has been Anton Chuykin (previously Peter Menshikh was in the post).

460,500 copies of Za Rulem were circulating during the period of 2010-2011, making it the sixth best-selling European automobile magazine.

== Other projects of the publishing house ==
- Newspaper Za Rulem-Region. First produced in 2001, and had a distinctive feature of the project; the ability to publish newspapers differently in different regions.
- Moto magazine. The first motorcycle magazine in Russia, which has been published since 1991.
- Kupi avto magazine. A magazine targeted for those who are potential car buyers. It explores the properties, options and prices for consumers.
- Reis magazine. The first issue of this magazine was published in 2007, and it is intended for professionals, managers, and owners of companies operating trucks and buses. In addition to economic issues in the publication on the professional level, it addresses the selection of vehicle composition, maintenance and repair of equipment, choice of tires, oil, supplies, leasing and loan processing, accounting, tax planning, insurance, and personnel policy formation.
- kupiauto.ru website. Site where using various tools you can pick up a car in purpose and characteristics, calculate the cost of operation.
- Za Rulem Electronic encyclopedia. An Internet encyclopedia containing materials on the devices of a vehicle, operation, components, safety, branded cars, and the people who played important roles in the automotive industry.
- Trucks. Annual catalog of trucks
- World of car tires and wheels. Annual catalog
- World automotive chemicals and cosmetics. Annual catalog
- Also available publishing encyclopedias and books automotive repair certain models of cars, textbooks, atlases highways.

== Interesting facts ==
- In June 1990, the publishing house "Za Rulem" released the magazine "Motorsport", which became the first in the USSR magazine devoted entirely to global automotive and motorcycle Championships. The magazine lasted until February 1998.
- Since 1994, the publishing house "Za Rulem" holds the Grand Prix. The purpose of the competition is to identify among the items of the year the best and most perfect via voting participation readers. A list of the winning car by classes is published in the last issue of the year.
- From 1978 to 1994 and from 2006 to the present time the magazine holds "Race Stars". The main prize is known as the Crystal Tire.
- Each January issue of the magazine is thinner than the rest, and each December the list of articles for all 12 rooms of this year (in the December issue of 2010 this tradition was interrupted, and a list of articles was posted on the official website)
- Before publishing "Za Rulem" the magazine published "Limousine." The latter magazine was eventually discontinued.
- In the section "Tips experienced" (formerly "chauffeur savvy", where readers send in tips on maintenance and repair of vehicles) in January 2002 give prizes for the best advice.
- Since January 2003, in each room under the heading "Our competition" publish task and at the end of each task award holder best response to it.
