= VAZ-2106 =

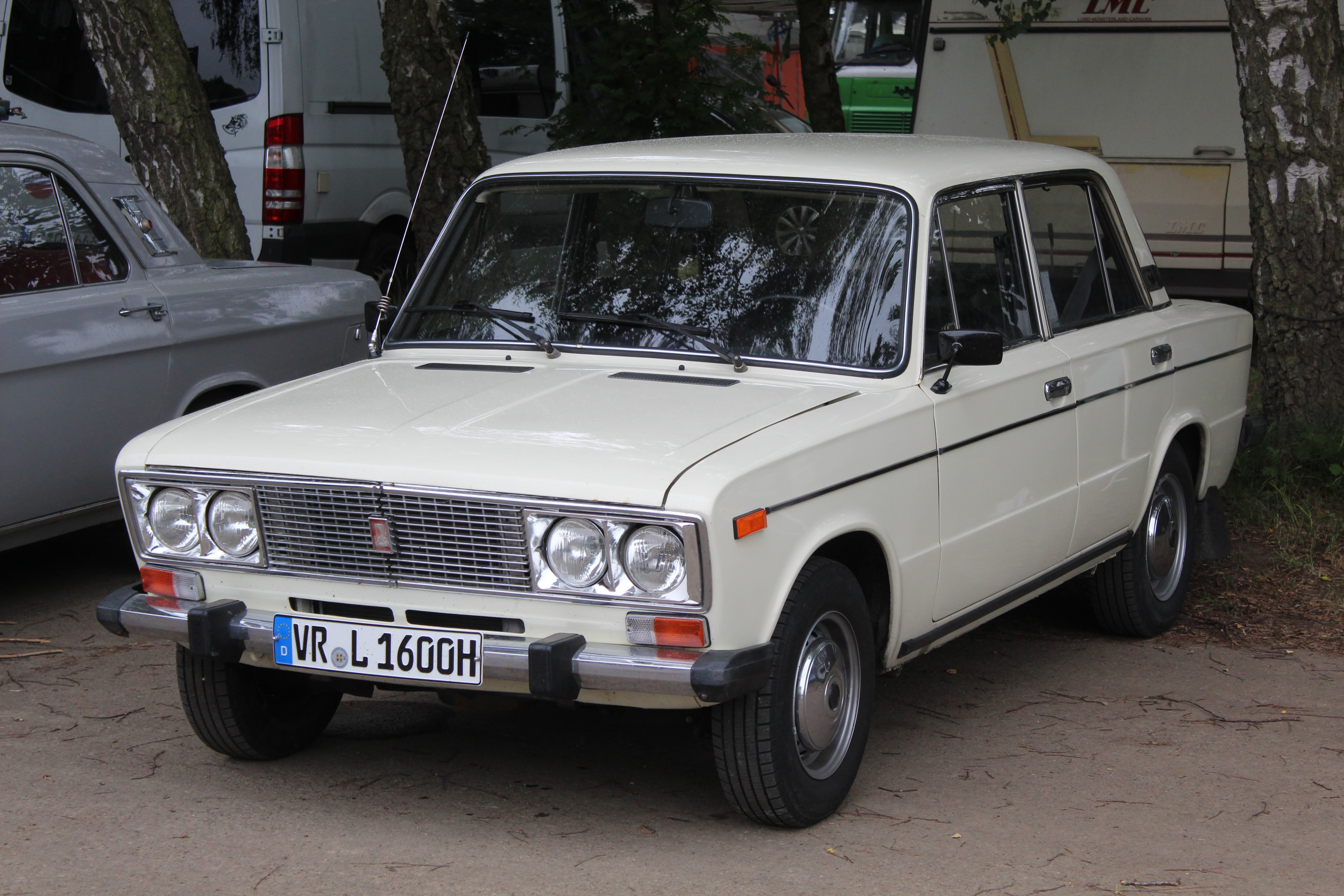

Overview
- Manufacturer: AvtoVAZ
- Also called: Lada 1600; VAZ-2106; Zhiguli 2106
- Production: 1976–2006
- Assembly: Soviet Union/Russia: Tolyatti (AvtoVAZ); Russia: Izhevsk (IzhAvto); Russia: Syzran (RosLada); Ukraine: Kherson (Anto-Rus)

Body and chassis
- Class: Compact car
- Body style: 4-door saloon
- Layout: Front-engine, rear-wheel-drive
- Related: VAZ-2101; VAZ-2103; VAZ-2105/04/07; Fiat 124

Powertrain
- Engine: 1568 cc I4
- Transmission: 4-speed manual; 3-speed automatic

Dimensions
- Wheelbase: 2,425 mm (95.5 in)
- Length: 4,090 mm (161.0 in)
- Width: 1,610 mm (63.4 in)
- Height: 1,370 mm (54.0 in)
- Kerb weight: 1,030 kg (2,271 lb)

Chronology
- Predecessor: VAZ-2103
- Successor: VAZ-2107

The VAZ-2106 Zhiguli (alternatively Zhiguli 2106) is a saloon produced by the Soviet (later Russian) automaker VAZ, and later, after the breakup of the Soviet Union, also by Russian Izhevsk Avto and Ukrainian Anto-Rus. In export markets, it was known simply as Lada 1600 or alternatively as Lada 2106. In the domestic market it was popularly nicknamed Шестёрка (Shestyorka, in English; The sixth one). A hugely popular car and one of the most successful Lada models, it was in serial production for 30 years (from 1976 to 2006), although production in the VAZ plant ended after 25 years, in 2001, with manufacture continuing at Izhevsk for the final five years.

== Overview ==
Derived from its predecessor, the VAZ-2103, 2106 was created as its alternative due to expense and complexity of production of chrome elements which were severely reduced on it (although it did not fully replace it until 1984, when the 2103 was finally discontinued). Like the 2103, the 2106 was a four-door, four-seat saloon, but powered by a more powerful 78 hp (57 kW) 1,568 cc (95.7 cu in) single overhead cam inline four engine of Lada's own design. It used the pistons of the VAZ-21011's 1,294 cc (79.0 cu in) and the crankshaft of the VAZ-2103's 1,452 cc (88.6 cu in). Though only marginally more powerful than the 2103's engine, it produced more torque, 86 ft⋅lbf (117 N⋅m) rather than 76 ft⋅lbf (103 N⋅m), making it easier to drive. Top speed was 93 mph (150 km/h), with 0–62 mph (0–100 km/h) acceleration in 16 seconds. For many consumers, it was "the top of the Eastern Bloc charts for comfort and prestige", since the more expensive and luxurious GAZ and ZIL cars, intended firstly for party members and various other state officials, were out of reach for them.

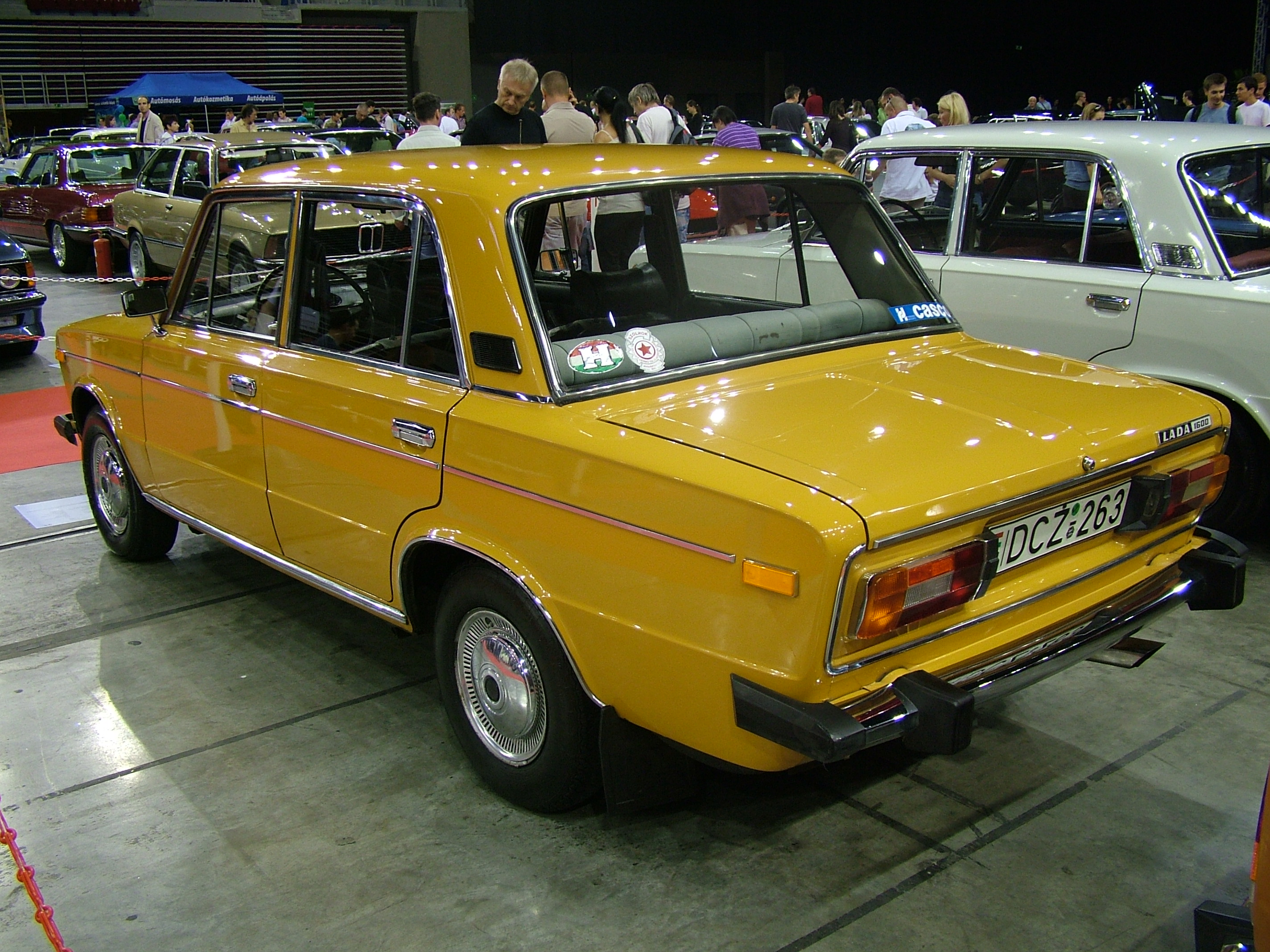
1978 Lada 1600

It debuted in December 1975, and "would become the most popular and most numerous VAZ product". It externally differed from its predecessor, the VAZ-2103, firstly by having smaller grille due to having plastic headlight surrounds, different bumpers and by wider taillights also featuring reverse lights, which were then a new feature for VAZ models. Internally it was almost as same as its predecessor with only minimal differences, most notably by being the first VAZ model with height adjustable headrests on front seats and also by its steering wheel; it was visually easily recognizable by being decorated with classic Russian ornaments together with Lada logo on its central (leather) part. In 1976, due to being the latest model in VAZ arsenal, it served as a basis for latest prototype what would become the highly successful VAZ-2121 Niva or Lada Niva 1600 the next year. It borrowed many of its elements to it, like firstly its 1600 cc 75 hp (55 kW) petrol engine, as well as its headlights and taillights, direction pointers, side/external mirrors, front seat headrests, steering wheel, instruments and many other details. The VAZ-2106 was severely restyled in the second half of 1990s, its chrome lined elements having further been reduced. The chrome external/side mirrors became black metallic back in the first half of the 1980s, when the VAZ-2103 was discontinued; however, the grille was now replaced with a black plastic one which also featured a new front Lada badge. Chrome lined rim covers and exterior body part edges were also removed. However, the chromed bumpers as well as Fiat 124 door knobs were still present until the very end of production. Internally, the aging Fiat 125 steering wheel (firstly used by VAZ-2103 and later by VAZ-2121 Niva) also featuring chrome elements was replaced by newer one. The previous wood imitation dashboard was replaced with black one and, along with some other details, its original berth foldable seats were also replaced with more modern ones.

The 21061, with the 75 hp (55 kW) 1,452 cc (88.6 cu in) VAZ-2103 engine, and 21063, with the 64 hp (47 kW) 1,294 cc (79.0 cu in), appeared in 1979. The 21063 would disappear in 1993. The less-powerful, but also cheaper, 21061 would be the sales leader, helping make the 2106 the top-selling Lada model. In Canada, the model was sold from late 1978-early 1979 as the Lada Signet, with the official factory name being VAZ 21061-37. It was made up to 1984. One variant of this model is the 21061-41, which had Canadian Domestic Market bumpers and fitments, but it featured European Domestic Market repeaters, tail lights, side logo, etc. This model is one of the rarest of the 2106 series, and some examples survive in the former USSR and in Europe.

Special rally-prepared versions had up to 135 hp (99 kW) from the 1,294 cc (79.0 cu in) and up to 150 hp (110 kW) from the 1,570 cc (96 cu in), while there was a turbocharged sixteen-valve 1.8 liter delivering 240 hp (177 kW).

In 2017, an old VAZ-2106 participating in the Banjul Challenge traversed twelve European and African countries in 15 days, starting in Saint Petersburg and finishing in Banjul, the Gambia. The car was eventually given to local residents, while four travellers returned home on a plane.

== Safety by modern standards ==
In 2002, the IZhmash version of the VAZ-2106 was awarded zero stars out of a possible four by the Russian ARCAP safety assessment program. The reviewers noted that the result was unsurprising and that the car was outdated by the time of the test, with its construction dating back to the 1960s.

== Models ==
Basic variants

- VAZ-2106 (February 1976–2006; export designation "Lada 1600") — base model 4-door saloon/sedan equipped with four-cylinder 1.6L (1,568cc) engine VAZ-2106 (same index as the car), producing 80 hp. Remained the primary domestic variant until 1981–1982; from that point onward, its production was gradually reduced and stopped until early 1990s. After small-scale production through the 1990s, the base VAZ-2106 became the sole variant in production after the 2106 manufacturing was transferred to IzhAvto in December 2001, continuing until January 2006. Badges: "Lada 1600" (export and some domestic cars until early 1990s), "Жигули 1600" (some domestic cars until early 1990s), "Lada 1600" simplified (all cars though mid-1990s), "Жигули" (all cars from late 1990s onward). Since the 2000s, the base VAZ-2106 has been sometimes referred to in official materials as "VAZ-21060" to distinguish it from its namesake family. Despite the fact that the 1.6L VAZ engine with fuel injection had the index "VAZ-21067" (which was never used for a car model), the VAZ-2106 never had factory standard fuel injection, and thus never used the engine in quesion (which was mainly used on VAZ-2107 and VAZ-2104 variants).
- VAZ-21061 (1977–2001; export designation "Lada 1500S") — variant with 1.5L (1,452cc) VAZ-2103 engine (75 hp). Originally started as an export variant, it entered the Soviet domestic market around 1981–1982 as a cheaper alternative; soon thereafter, during the abnormally large influx of the VAZ-21063s, its production was gradually reduced and stopped until early 1990s. From 1994 to 2001, it was the primary domestic VAZ-2106 variant, its production ended in December 2001 due to the Izhevsk transfer. Several dedicated trims of the VAZ-21061, including the Canadian VAZ-21061-37, were developed specifically for the export markets, where the 1.5L was treated as the standard VAZ-2106 engine. Badges: "Lada 1500S" (export and domestic cars until early 1990s), "Lada 1500" simplified (all cars though mid-1990s), "Жигули" (all cars from late 1990s onward).
- VAZ-21063 (1977–1994; export designation "Lada 1300SL") — variant with 1.3L (1,294cc) VAZ-21011 or VAZ-2105 engine (69 hp, timing chain and timing belt respectively). Originally started as an export variant, it entered the Soviet domestic market around 1981-1982 as the cheapest variant of the VAZ-2106 family. After the VAZ-2103 was discontinued in 1984 and the 2106 exports started to decrease, the VAZ-21063 de-facto became the only domestic variant through the second half of the 1980s, produced in unusually large numbers and almost always delivered to private citizens without any export or state service reservations: through 1987, 223,957 VAZ-21063 were built, comprising almost a third of the total VAZ output of the year (728,250 vehicles); around 189,3 thousands of them were delivered to regular Soviet citizens. Discontinued in April 1994 along with all other 1.2L and 1.3L VAZ models. Badges: "Lada 1300SL" (export and domestic cars until early 1990s), "Lada 1300" simplified (all cars though mid-1990s).
- VAZ-21065 (1990–2001) — 1990s upscale variant of ambiguous origin and inconsistent specifications. The VAZ-21065 has never been formally announced in any press, its earliest mentions can be traced to the May 1991 Za Rulem issue, where it's mentioned in the 1990 production tally and the table with all ongoing car models, where it's listed as a 1.6L variant of the VAZ-21063. Despite being allegedly an "export variant", there is little to no evidence of it being sold anywhere outside of the former Soviet states. Compared to the regular models, the VAZ-21065 used five-speed transmission, Solex carburator of the VAZ-2108/2109 Samara family with contactless ignition, and rubber/aluminum bumpers of the VAZ-2105, it also had revised interior design, altered gear ratio, and rear window heater as a standard feature. It is ambiguous which was the standard powertrain of the VAZ-21065: official documentation either avoids mentioning the engines at all, or it claims that the car had two trims with 1.6L and 1.5L engines respectively, "VAZ-21065-00" and "VAZ-21065-01". Despite this, the evidence of 1.6L engine being equipped on any 21065s is minimal, with most surviving cars documented with the 1.5L powertrain; the early official AvtoVAZ site listed the VAZ-21065 with 1.5L as the sole engine option in 1999. Discontinued along with the VAZ-21061 in December 2001.

Right-hand drive, limited production and specialised variants

- VAZ-21062 — right-hand drive variant of the base 1.6L VAZ-2106. Sold in the UK as "Lada 1600 Saloon" from September 1978 to April 1984.
- VAZ-21064 — planned right-hand drive variant of the 1.5L VAZ-21061. Never sold in the UK, presumably never entered production.
- VAZ-21066 — planned right-hand drive variant of the 1.3L VAZ-21063. Never sold in the UK, presumably never entered production.
- VAZ-21061-037 — Canadian-market variant of the VAZ-21061, sold between August 1978 and 1984. Compared to the regular domestic variant, it was fitted with bulky "five-miles per hour" bumpers with integrated parking lights and turn signals (not used by any other VAZ variants) and hydraulic shock absorbers, as well as door intrusion beams, North American-standard lighting with extra side markers, and other minor adaptations. It achieved modest success prior to being replaced by VAZ-2107/2104-family models in the Canadian market during the 1980s.
- VAZ-21061-041/21601-035 — European-market variants of the VAZ-21061-037 (general purpose and Nordic respectively), sold through early 1980s as upmarket trims of the regular VAZ-21061. The special bumpers were retained, but the hydraulic shock absorbers behind them were removed, so the bumpers relocated closer to the body; door intrusion beams were removed and European-standard lighting was used instead instead of North American.
