= AvtoVAZ vehicles in international markets =

Exports of AvtoVAZ vehicles to the West began in 1974; Ladas were sold as in several Western nations during the 1970s and 1980s, including Canada, the United Kingdom, France, Belgium, Luxembourg and the Netherlands, though trade sanctions banned their export to the United States. Under the original agreement with Fiat, the car could not be sold in competition with the 124 until its replacement (the Fiat 131 Mirafiori) had been released and all Fiat production of the 124 had ceased. Sales to Italy were not permitted so as to protect Fiat's lucrative home market.

Lada cars became popular in Russia and Eastern Europe during the 1970s and 1980s, particularly in former Eastern bloc countries. Lada made its name in Western Europe selling large volumes of the VAZ-2101 and its many derivatives as an economy car during the 1980s. The common Lada sedan and estate, sometimes known as the "Classic" in the West, was based on the 1966 Fiat 124 sedan (VAZ 2104/2105/2107 vehicles were known as Signet in Canada, Riva in the UK, and Nova in Germany).

Exported worldwide in the 1980s and 1990s, Lada was a big foreign currency earner for the hard-pressed Soviet Union and was used in barter arrangements in some countries. For example, Coca-Cola traded its drinks in exchange for Lada cars which were then shipped to the United Kingdom and sold. Over 60% of production was exported, mainly to Western countries (the US was the only large market not to have imported Ladas).

Economic instability in the former Soviet Union in the 1990s, tightening emissions and safety legislation meant that AvtoVAZ withdrew from most Western markets by late 1997. In later years, Lada is again exported. The Lada is marketed in Russia, Belarus, Ukraine, Armenia and Azerbaijan, and within the European Union, it has been made available in the Czech Republic, Romania, Slovakia, Austria, France, Germany, Hungary, and Egypt.

== Americas ==
=== Brazil ===
Ladas arrived in Brazil in 1990, when Brazilian president Fernando Collor lifted the ban on car imports. Lada was the first car maker to enter the Brazilian car market as an official importer, grey importers having already brought in other brands soon after the importation re-opening. Initially, the Lada 2105 (sedan) and 2104 (station wagon) models (badged as the "Lada Laika") and the "Lada Niva" were successful, mostly among taxi drivers, because of their low prices and functionality. Between 1990 and 1992, Lada sold more cars than any other importer to Brazil. Following their arrival, Lada cars were regarded by consumers and local specialized media, as outdated and inefficient but their commercial success was due to the Lada's publicity campaign which gave their cars an image of imported vehicle affordable for almost everyone, combined with consumer curiosity for imported products, a novelty at the time.

Shortly thereafter the Samara was introduced, but did not enjoy the same success as the Niva and the Laika. However, the Niva continued to be strong in the off-road market, even having a limited edition exclusively for Brazil (Niva Pantanal). It continued to be sold until 1997. Many of the last Lada Nivas sold in Brazil had the 1.6L engine with carburettor and points ignition, with the last ones fitted with the 1.7i and electronic ignition. Most of the Nivas and Laikas sold in Brazil remain operational and used cars command high prices. A 1991 Niva in very good condition can cost as much as R$11,000 or US$5,500, far more than the average price for a car of that year. The normal price for a Lada Niva made in year 1991 or 1992 is around R$6,000 or US$3,000 on the Brazilian used car market. As many as 30,000 Lada cars were sold in Brazil between 1990 and 1997.

Despite the Lada Niva having a considerable fanbase among Brazilian off-road enthusiasts, and the Lada Laika. The Lada Samara was never well-accepted in the Brazilian used car market since Lada's importation shutdown in 1997, mostly due to the issues reported above, but also due to the lack of spare parts and dealer support. Most of the Samaras were already dismantled or are abandoned, no longer running. It is not unusual to see those remaining exemplars being given for free or sold for very cheap prices. The few remaining Laikas, Nivas, and Samaras in Brazil, are using adapted spare parts from other models and makers.

=== Canada ===
LadaCanada started importing in late 1978 for the 1979 model year. The first model was the Lada 1500, a variant of the 2106 with a 1500 cc engine. The Lada Niva, a 1.6L 4x4 Lada, was introduced for the 1981 model year and did very well, with over 12,000 sold the first year. By the mid 1980s, the lineup consisted of the 1600 (2106), Signet (2107), and Niva 4x4. Around this time, the Signet was the least expensive new car available in Canada. 1987 saw the introduction of the Samara hatchback, Lada's first front-wheel drive offering which also served as the replacement for the Signet sedan, which was discontinued after the 1987 model year. By the early 1990s, the lineup included the Samara hatchback, convertible, and sedan, the Sagona sedan (which was essentially a well-equipped Samara), the Niva 4x4 in SUV, convertible, and pickup truck variants, and the Signet wagon (2104). Due to an aging lineup and declining customer interest, Lada reduced their offerings, with 1994 being the final year for the Signet wagon, 1997 being the final year for the Samara, and 1998 being the final year for the Niva, which marked the end of Lada sales in Canada.

=== Chile ===
Ladas had been sold in Chile for some time when a catalytic converter requirement was gradually introduced there beginning in 1987. Lada used a Swiss manufacturer of emissions equipment and sold cars thus equipped for a few years. It was later shown that the equipment did not meet the requirement, but Chile did not have the requisite technology to verify manufacturer claims on their own. Lada ended up withdrawing from Chilean market before the end of the nineties.

=== Colombia ===
In Colombia, the Lada brand has been seen since the late 1970s. After the beginning of the decade, under the presidency of Misael Pastrana Borrero, with diplomatic relations between Colombia and the Soviet Union being principally economic, local products were exported in exchange for importing products from the USSR including cars such as the Lada brand. This lasted from the middle to later portion of the decade. Currently, a Colombian website has information and photographs about all Lada vehicles manufactured by AvtoVAZ.

The models were usually from the late 1970s to the early 1980s particularly Niva 4x2 and 4x4. In the 1990s, the 2110/2112 models in their familiar and sedan versions became available as well as the Samara (3 and 5 doors versions) plus a limited number of the sedan version.

Then, a local assembler, known as AutoTAT, using technology from the Niva introduced to the Colombian market Niva models under the brand Bronto as the Landole and Fora models, which differ from the original model in its motorization (since they are said to use systems Sequential electronic injection), as well as in their measurements; Being these up to 30 cm longer than the Niva model.

Nowadays, only vehicles from the old Kia plant in Ecuador, the local factory AYMESA, that arrive like Lada, are already seen in the country, using already a motorization and electronics according to the present times, until 2006, when the importation for this model was ceased for his low demand and a high competence from other vehicle manufacturers from Japan and China.

=== Costa Rica ===
Lada cars arrived in Costa Rica in the late seventies and became popular in the eighties as one of the few new cars that the middle class could afford. The models included the Niva, 2104 and Samara. Around 200 Ladas still circulate, from a total of 1500 imported from Russia in the '80s.

=== Cuba ===
Lada cars appeared in Cuba in the mid-1970s. They became popular in the '80s and by the end of this decade represented more than 30% of the cars used in the country. The Lada 2101 is used by the police and as taxis.

=== Ecuador ===
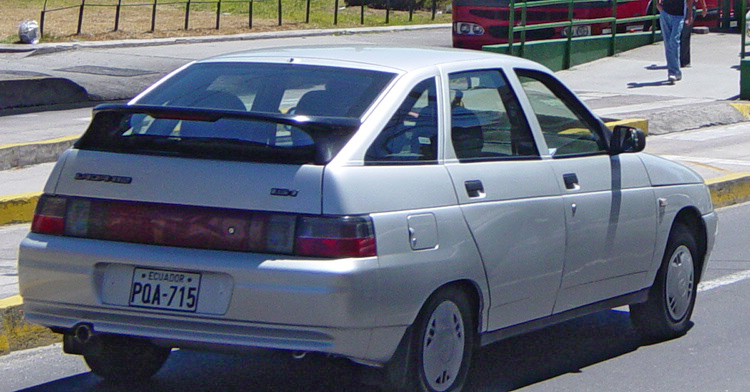
Lada 112 "Sport" in Ecuador

Lada entered Ecuador during the 1970s. Imports stopped in the mid-1990s. In 1999 AvtoVAZ associated with the local factory AYMESA to produce the Lada Niva 4x4 1.7i. In 2000, the first units appeared on the market. This agreement ended in 2004 when imports resumed.

By 2007 other car models were being imported: the Lada 110, Lada 111, Lada 112, Lada Kalina (sedan), Lada Niva 2121 (3-doors), Lada Niva 2131 (5-doors) and the Lada 2107 nicknamed "Clasico" (Classic).

During 2008 imports of most models decreased or, in some cases, stopped. Only the Niva 2121 and Niva 2131 continued to be imported in 2009.

As of 2010, imports stopped again. However, the importation of spare parts continued.

Few old models, such as the Lada 2101, still function.

=== Jamaica ===
An agreement between Jamaica and the USSR in the early 1980s brought Ladas in under a barter arrangement in exchange for bauxite ore. Ladas became popular as taxis, replacing the dated Morris Oxford.

=== Trinidad and Tobago ===
From 1995 until 2001, Lada Riva sedans, estates, Nivas and Samaras found a market in Trinidad and Tobago. Using right hand drive kits from the defunct Lada UK, these were sold as budget transportation. At one time the Riva 1.5 SE sedan was the cheapest new car available. Trinidadian dealer Petrogas Ltd. marketed the Riva as a family runabout and the Niva as a lifestyle 4x4. They retailed for between US$8,000.00–$15,000.00. Increasing competition from grey market Japanese models soon forced Ladas out. The Samara was introduced in 2000 as a last-ditch attempt to salvage the brand. It failed and the last Samaras were sold as unfinished kits in 2003.

== Asia-Pacific ==
=== Australia ===
Ladas were first imported into Australia in 1984 with the Niva compact 4WD and in 1988 the Samara three-door hatchback was introduced. The Samara five-door hatchback and four-door sedan later joined the Samara three-door hatch, but under different names—the five-door hatchback was called the "Cevaro" and the four-door sedan was sold as the "Sable". The Lada Niva 4WD was offered as a pickup truck on an extended wheelbase and with a two-door soft top.

In 1988, approximately 6,000 Lada Samaras were modified by Peter Brock's special vehicles operation that had previously made high performance Holden Commodores. The cars would be known as the "Lada Samara Sedan Brock Delux" and included a few subtle Brock-devised suspension tweaks to improve the car's low speed ride. It cost about A$3,000 more than the base model Samara.

While initial sales were promising, by 1996 sales had crashed to under 100 units. Ladas were imported into Australia after 1994, but it took two years to sell the remaining stock.

The Lada Niva enjoys a small cult following in Australia; it is the Lada model most often seen on Australian roads.

=== New Zealand ===
Ladas were briefly popular in New Zealand in the 1980s. Meat, dairy and fertiliser exports to Russia were wholly or partly paid for with Belarus tractors, Stolichnaya vodka and Lada cars. The New Zealand Dairy Board were distributors for Lada vehicles. Some Ladas, even those of the 1970s, can still be seen on New Zealand roads (especially in rural areas and offshore islands) but are increasingly rare.

=== Singapore ===
The Samara, Riva and Niva were introduced in Singapore for a brief period in the early 1990s. They proved impractical in a country where cars over three years of age must be inspected yearly. The Certificate of Entitlement system required drivers paying a hefty sum after 10 years to continue driving their cars. Lada quickly left. Few, if any, Lada cars remain on Singapore roads.

== Europe ==
=== Germany ===
Until 1999 Lada was imported through a number of official importers: Eurolada, Samara GmbH and Deutsche Lada. After they ceased to exist, LADA Automobile GmbH Deutschland in Buxtehude took over and imported the Niva with some success, but also Kalina, Vesta or Granta have been sold at some point. In 2019 only the Vesta and the 4x4 (ex-Niva) are sold. Plans are to stop the official import until 2022 due to too strict emission standards.

Despite the normal Lada Range (except Niva II and Largus) also cars from other Brands have been sold through the Importer in the 90s: Moskvitch 2141 (as Lada Aleko) and also ZAZ Tavria (as Lada Tavria)

=== Finland ===
Lada cars came to Finland in 1971. Lada became the car for the everyman in Finland. It was cheap, reasonably reliable, easy to fix, tune and rig. Ladas were among the popular cars for many years in the 1970s but their share declined. In 2004 Lada was in 26th position. Delta-Auto stopped importing Lada to Finland in 2009.

Samaras were assembled at Valmet during the 1990s specifically for the European market, known as the "Euro-Samara".

In 2016 an entrepreneur started importing new Lada models to Finland again. As of 2020 only two Niva 4x4 models are on the price list.

=== Italy ===
Sales to Italy were forbidden by the agreement between the Soviet government and Fiat, to protect Fiat from cheap imports in its home market.

=== Portugal ===
AvtoVAZ began exporting cars to Portugal in 1986. In April 2002, Lada exited the car market.

=== Iceland ===
Lada cars were imported to Iceland over some period of time and were popular for several reasons, a few of those were their good DIY features, fitting well to the cold climate, and handling the road conditions of the country. The import of Russian cars started in 1954 with 100 units of Pobeda, then followed the Moskvich, Volga and finally Lada.

=== Sweden ===
"Lada" means barn in Swedish and was imported to Sweden during the 1970s and 1980s for the Soviet Union to earn foreign currency. The early classic Lada version of the Fiat 124 was featured with Russian dashboard. The Niva SUV developed a cult following for its robust and inexpensive DIY features. The Lada Samara introduced in 1986 sold less. After the Soviet Union collapsed, Asian brands, as well as the newly reintroduced Škoda, forced Lada out of the market in the late 1990s and the importer ceased its operations in 1999. Grey market imports continued, mainly the Niva. Lada Sweden was officially reopened in 2010 by one of the grey market importers. During the 1990s an ad for Samara was prominently displayed for several years at Stockholm Central Station.

=== United Kingdom and Ireland ===
AvtoVAZ began exporting to the UK in 1974 and Ireland in 1983 as Lada.

After introduction of the Riva range to the UK in 1983, with UK and Ireland sales peaking in 1988 at 33,000 units (nearly 2% of UK car sales). A memorable advert for the Riva was produced featuring comedy duo Cannon & Ball. AvtoVAZ built up a network of UK and Ireland Lada dealers through its marketing associate, Satra Motors. The Satra-owned dealerships were all sold off in 1987 and 1988.

The Lada Riva & Niva were the first models to be imported into Ireland. They were followed by the Samara in 1987 which sold in very low numbers. Lada pulled out of the Irish market in the early 1990s.

Lada was a victim of the political and economic problems of Russia in the late 1980s and early 1990s. It was not possible to invest adequately. By the 1990s the Riva design was archaic, dating back to 1966. Not even prices starting below £5,000 were enough to disguise its vintage design. By 1994, annual sales of the Lada range had fallen to just over 9,000 – less than a third of the peak figures attained six years earlier.

United Kingdom and Ireland sales dwindled to barely 8,000 units in 1996, the last full year in which Lada cars were marketed. By this stage, many Lada dealers either went out of business or switched brands – many Lada franchisees went on to sell Proton or Hyundai vehicles. Confronted with the need to meet 1992 EU emission control requirements, Lada tried to continue to use a carburetor with an exhaust catalyst instead of electronic fuel injection. Three years later at their first emissions MOT test they failed very badly: over-fuelling had destroyed the catalysts. This failure, along with a shortage of certain imported components and increased competition from Daewoo and Proton in the 1990s, led AvtoVAZ to withdraw from most Western European markets.

In 1979, Lada produced the Niva four-wheel drive. It had monocoque construction, which was innovative in the 4x4 market where a heavy separate chassis was the norm. It competed well with Japanese rivals such as the Suzuki SJ/Samurai and Daihatsu Fourtrak in practicality and stability and its off-road ability. The Niva was significantly cheaper than its rivals. This was one area where Lada achieved some market success in the 1990s. The Niva was adopted by several British police forces and attracted something of a cult following with 4x4 enthusiasts. The Niva could have benefited from a diesel option, but it was never offered.

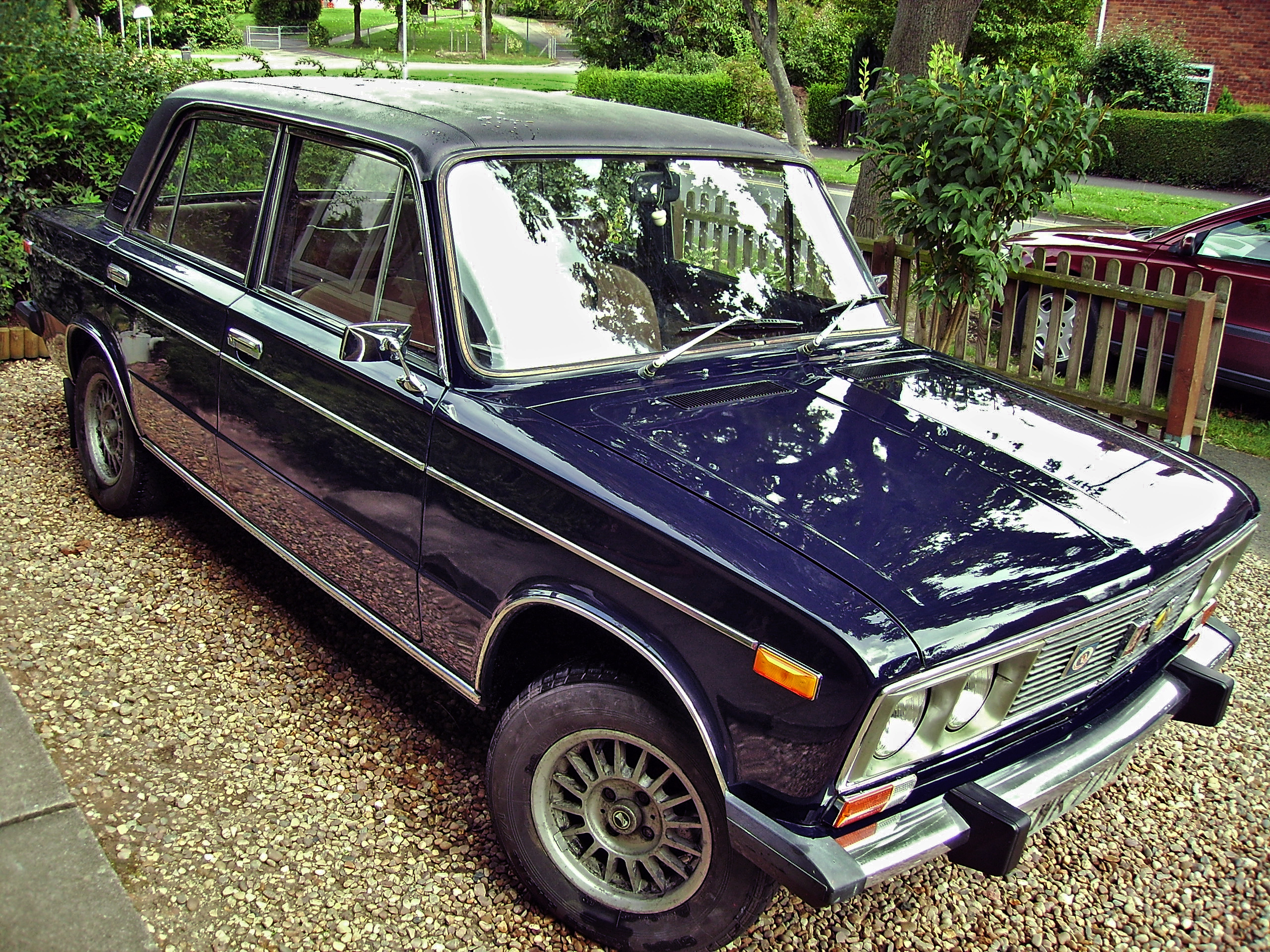
Lada 1600

The Samara was launched in the UK in November 1987.

The decision to withdraw from the UK was announced on 4 July 1997. More than 100,000 of the 350,000 or so Lada cars sold in Britain were still on the road, with more than 1,000 still in stock. Just over 5,000 Lada cars were sold in Britain during 1997. After Lada withdrew in 1997, several dealers continued to import Nivas. These required some local modification of the new General Motors-supplied fuel-injection to meet emission control standards. The 2110 was never sold in the UK or Ireland.

After Lada (UK) ceased operations in 1997, the remains of the British network of Lada dealers were serviced by Lada (France). Ladas rapidly disappeared from British roads. They had minimal second-hand value in the UK and a re-export market for Russia moved many UK- and Irish-registered Ladas back to Russia (especially by Russian trawlermen), to be stripped for spare parts or to be sold to Russian buyers. They appreciated the export cars built to better specification than the local versions. Many Ladas returned to Russia by ship through Latvia and Lithuania where enterprising mechanics switched the right hand drive to the left side for about USD 500–600 and then shipped them back to Russia for second-hand resale.

Several attempts were made to reintroduce Ladas to the UK. In May 2010, the Niva (a design now more than 30 years old) became available again, through an independent importer. Aimed at the agricultural market, three models are available (all LHD), the three-door four-seat hatchback at £10,000, a two-seat commercial van, £8000 and a two-door, four-seat pickup for £12,000. All meet UK Vehicle Certification Agency standards. Engine options are restricted to a 1.7-litre petrol engine, with or without LPG conversion.

== Middle East and Northern Africa ==
=== Egypt ===
Both the Riva and Niva are popular amongst the Egyptian working-class. The Riva sedan serves as one of Egypt's most popular taxis and is a fixture in virtually every city.

=== Turkey ===
Lada entered the Turkish market in the late-1980s. Most sales were of Samaras (100,000 units). The Niva made an impact in the 4x4 market. New models like Lada 2110 are still sold in Turkey, with less success.
