= Department for Transport =

UK Government ministerial department

Coordinates: 51.4946°N 0.1293°W

Department overview
- Formed: 29 May 2002; 24 years ago
- Jurisdiction: England (wholly); Scotland, Northern Ireland and Wales (limited powers)
- Headquarters: Great Minster House, Horseferry Road, London
- Annual budget: £2.9 billion; 2019–20
- Secretary of State responsible: Heidi Alexander MP, Secretary of State for Transport
- Department executives: Jo Shanmugalingam, Permanent Secretary; Vacant, Second Permanent Secretary
- Child agencies: Active Travel England; Driver and Vehicle Licensing Agency; Driver and Vehicle Standards Agency; Maritime and Coastguard Agency; Vehicle Certification Agency
- Website: gov.uk/dft

- Applies to: England; United Kingdom (some reserved matters)
- Relates to: Transport

Other UK counterparts
- Northern Ireland: Department for Infrastructure
- Scotland: Transport Scotland
- Wales: Transport for Wales

The Department for Transport (DfT) is a ministerial department of the Government of the United Kingdom. It is wholly responsible for overseeing the transport network in England, and for limited transport matters that are not devolved to the governments of Scotland, Northern Ireland and Wales. The department develops national transport policy, coordinates infrastructure investment, and regulates transport services. It is headed by the Secretary of State for Transport, who is supported by a ministerial team and the Permanent Secretary as the department’s most senior civil servant.

The department’s expenditure, administration and policy are scrutinised by the Transport Select Committee.

== Responsibilities ==
=== Objectives ===
The department’s objectives are set out in its strategic and policy publications.

- Improve performance and reliability on the rail network.
- Support and grow bus services across England.
- Deliver major transport infrastructure and improve connectivity.
- Decarbonise transport and support the transition to net zero.
- Integrate transport modes to improve journey efficiency.

=== Devolved matters ===
The three governments of Scotland, Northern Ireland and Wales each have their own executive agencies responsible for transport – Transport Scotland (Scotland), Transport for Wales (Wales) and the Department for Infrastructure (Northern Ireland).

Transport policy is devolved in a number of areas, with certain matters remaining reserved to the UK Government. Some of the devolved matters transferred to the Scottish Government, Northern Ireland Executive and Welsh Government are:

- Air transport (Scotland and Wales)
- Setting drink and drug-driving limits (Scotland)
- Speed limits (Scotland)
- Concessionary travel schemes (Scotland)
- Parking and cycling (Scotland)
- Driving and vehicle certification (Scotland and Wales)
- Navigation (including merchant shipping) (Wales and Scotland)
- Road signs (Scotland)
- Local road pricing (Scotland)
- Railways (cross-border services and infrastructure)
- Road numbering (Scotland and Wales)
- Promotion of road safety (Scotland)
- Transport security (Scotland and Wales)

In Northern Ireland, transport functions are largely devolved to the Department for Infrastructure, with the exception of Civil aviation and navigation, which remain reserved.

=== Publications ===
The department publishes policy papers, statistical releases, strategic plans, and its annual report and accounts.

== List of public bodies ==
The DfT sponsors a total of 24 public bodies, including executive agencies, non-departmental public bodies and public corporations.

Entity	Type	Formed
Active Travel England	Agency	2020
Air Accidents Investigation Branch	Branch	1915
British Transport Police Authority	Public Body	1949
Civil Aviation Authority	Company	1972
Crossrail International	Company	2022
DfT Operator	Company	2018
Disabled Persons Transport Advisory Committee	Public Body	1985
Driver and Vehicle Licensing Agency	Agency	1965
Driver and Vehicle Standards Agency	Agency	2014
East West Railway Company	Company	2018
Great British Railways	Company	2026
High Speed 2	Company	2009
Marine Accident Investigation Branch	Branch	1989
Maritime and Coastguard Agency	Agency	1998
National Highways	Company	2015
Network Rail	Company	2002
Northern Lighthouse Board	Public Body	1867
Office of Rail and Road	Non-Ministerial	2004
Platform4	Company	2025
Rail Accident Investigation Branch	Branch	2005
Traffic Commissioners for Great Britain	Public Body	1930
Transport Focus	Public Body	1948
Trinity House Lighthouse Service	Public Body	1514
Vehicle Certification Agency	Agency	1979

== History ==
Ministry of Transport Act 1919 (Note: Section 30(1).)
- Act of Parliament
- Parliament of the United Kingdom
- Long title: An Act to establish a Ministry of Transport and for purposes connected therewith.
- Citation: 9 & 10 Geo. 5. c. 50
- Territorial extent: United Kingdom

Dates
- Royal assent: 15 August 1919
- Commencement: 15 August 1919 (Note: The Acts of Parliament (Commencement) Act 1793.)
- Repealed: Northern Ireland: 18 August 1890
Other legislation
Amends	Special Acts (Extension of Time) Act 1915
Amended by	Administration of Justice (Miscellaneous Provisions) Act 1933; Highways Act 1959; Statute Law Revision Act 1959; Statute Law Revision Act 1960; Statute Law Revision Act 1964; Local Government Act 1966; Local Government (Scotland) Act 1966; Secretary of State for the Environment Order 1970; Statute Law (Repeals) Act 1977; Statute Law (Repeals) Act 1993; Railways Act 2005
Repealed by	Northern Ireland: Roads (Northern Ireland) Order 1980

Status: Partially repealed

Text of statute as originally enacted

Revised text of statute as amended

Text of the Ministry of Transport Act 1919 as in force today (including any amendments) within the United Kingdom, from legislation.gov.uk.

The Ministry of Transport was established by the Ministry of Transport Act 1919 (9 & 10 Geo. 5. c. 50) which provided for the transfer to the new ministry of powers and duties of any government department in respect of railways, light railways, tramways, canals and inland waterways, roads, bridges and ferries, and vehicles and traffic thereon, harbours, docks and piers.

In September 1919, all the powers of the Road Board, the Ministry of Health, and the Board of Trade in respect of transport, were transferred to the new ministry. Initially, the department was organised to carry out supervisory, development and executive functions, but the end of railway and canal control by 1921, and the settlement of financial agreements relating to the wartime operations of the railways reduced its role. In 1923, the department was reorganised into three major sections: Secretarial, Finance and Roads.

The ministry's functions were exercised initially throughout the United Kingdom. An Irish Branch was established in 1920, but then was taken over by the government of the Irish Free State on the transfer of functions in 1922.

The department took over transport functions of Scottish departments in the same year, though certain functions relating to local government, loan sanction, byelaws and housing were excepted. In May 1937, power to make provisional orders for harbour, pier and ferry works was transferred to the Secretary of State for Scotland.

The growth of road transport increased the responsibilities of the ministry, and in the 1930s, and especially with defence preparations preceding the outbreak of war, government responsibilities for all means of transport increased significantly.

Government control of transport and diverse associated matters has been reorganised a number of times in modern history, being the responsibility of:

- 1909–1919: Road Board
- 1919–1941: Ministry of Transport
- 1941–1946: Ministry of War Transport, after absorption of Ministry of Shipping
- 1946–1953: Ministry of Transport
- 1953–1959: Ministry of Transport and Civil Aviation
- 1959–1970: Ministry of Transport
- 1970–1976: Department of the Environment
- 1976–1997: Department of Transport
- 1997–2001: Department for the Environment, Transport and the Regions
- 2001–2002: Department for Transport, Local Government and the Regions
- 2002–present: Department for Transport

The name "Ministry of Transport" lives on in the annual MOT test, a test of vehicle safety, roadworthiness, and exhaust emissions, which most vehicles used on public roads in the UK are required to pass annually once they reach three years old (four years for vehicles in Northern Ireland).

The flag of the old Ministry of Transport

=== 2017 judicial review ===
Following a series of strikes, poor performance, concerns over access for the disabled and commuter protests relating to Govia Thameslink Railway, a group of commuters crowdfunded £26,000 to initiate a judicial review into the Department for Transport's management and failure to penalise Govia or remove the management contract. The oral hearing to determine if commuters have standing to bring a judicial review was listed for 29 June 2017 at the Royal Courts of Justice.

The attempted judicial review was not allowed to proceed, and the commuters who brought it had to pay £17,000 in costs to the Department for Transport.

== Ministers ==
The DfT Ministers are as follows, with cabinet ministers in bold:

Minister	Portrait	Position	Portfolio
**Heidi Alexander** MP		Secretary of State for Transport	overall responsibility for the department; overarching responsibility for the departmental portfolio and oversight of the ministerial team; delivering the transport priorities of the government: making transport cheaper, greener, and more reliable; ensuring the transport network is safe and accessible; corporate functions such as oversight of departmental finance and public appointments.
Lord Hendy of Richmond Hill		Minister of State for Rail	rail policy and infrastructure; rail reform and GBR design; workforce reform; HS2; Northern Powerhouse Rail (NPR); East West Rail (EWR); light rail; London and TfL
Justin Madders MP		Parliamentary Under-Secretary of State for Roads	roads, including Road Investment Strategy (RIS); road safety; automated vehicles; micromobility; motoring agencies; vehicle standards; Lower Thames Crossing; AI and technology
Simon Lightwood MP		Parliamentary Under-Secretary of State for Buses and Local Transport	devolution and regions; buses and coaches; taxis and PHVs; local transport; active travel; accessibility; VAWG; integrated transport, ticketing and fares; planning and housing; electric vehicles, decarbonisation and environment
Keir Mather MP		Parliamentary Under Secretary of State for Aviation, Maritime and Logistics	aviation; Heathrow expansion; maritime; international; security and resilience; freight and borders; sustainable aviation fuel (SAF)

The Permanent Secretary is Jo Shanmugalingam.

=== Former ministers ===
- Parliamentary Secretary to the Ministry of Transport (1924–1970)

== See also ==
- Julie, a public information film of the department's "THINK!" campaign
- Transport Research Laboratory (formerly known as the Road Research Laboratory, then the Transport and Road Research Laboratory); now a privatised company
- Urban Traffic Management and Control
- Rail transport in Great Britain
