= Kama Atom =

Battery electric subcompact hatchback

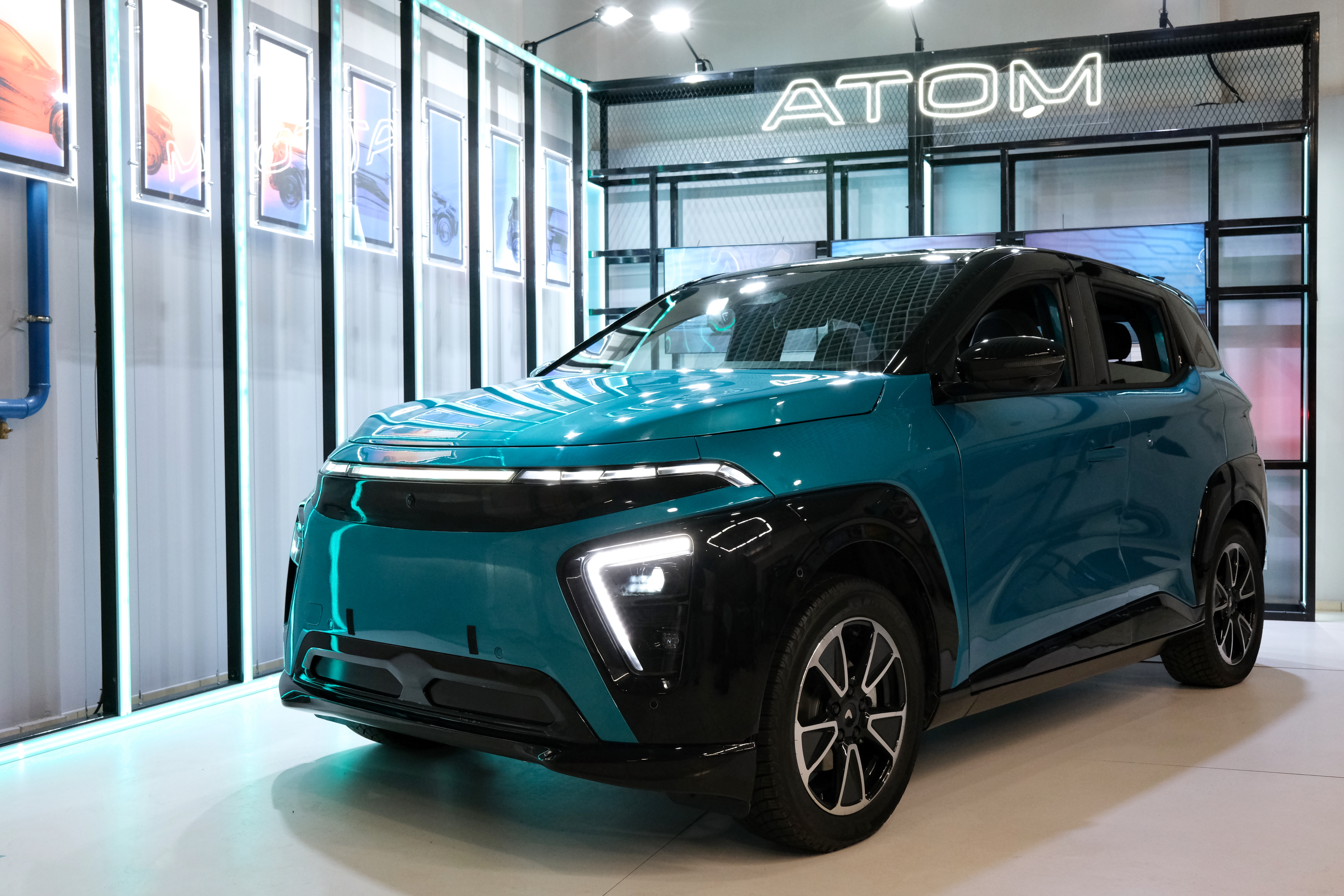

Overview
- Manufacturer: Kama
- Production: 2025–present
- Assembly: Russia: Moscow Automobile Plant "Moskvitch"

Body and chassis
- Class: Subcompact / supermini (B)
- Body style: Hatchback

Powertrain
- Electric range: 500 km (310 mi)

Dimensions
- Length: 3,995 mm (157.3 in)
- Width: 1,780 mm (70.1 in)
- Height: 1,615 mm (63.6 in)

Chronology
- Predecessor: Kama-1

The Kama Atom is a battery electric subcompact hatchback produced by the Russian car manufacturer Kama.

== History ==
The predecessor to the Atom was the Kama-1 concept vehicle, developed as part of the Federal Target Program "Research and Development in Priority Areas of Development of the Scientific and Technological Complex of Russia for 2014-2020" by specialists from the Peter the Great St. Petersburg Polytechnic University, with the support of heavy vehicle manufacturer Kamaz.

Development work began in 2021, led by Harald Grübel, formerly the vice president of engineering at AvtoVAZ. The company JSC "Kama" was registered in Naberezhnye Chelny led by Igor Povarazdnyuk, Sergey Kogogin and Ruben Vardanyan. In November 2022, the name and branding of the Kama Atom was announced, named after the works of Konstantin Tsiolkovsky. Around the same time, the involvement of Rosatom in the project was announced.

In May 2023, a prototype Atom was unveiled in Moscow, developed in cooperation with the Italian design studio Torino Design. It was announced that over 90 companies would be involved in the supply chain for the vehicle. In addition to domestic companies, are suppliers from Turkey, India and China.

In June-July 2025, a prototype Atom embarked on a promotional campaign aboard the nuclear-powered icebreaker 50 Let Pobedy, reaching the North Pole after ten days at sea.

In September 2025, the vehicle received its vehicle type approval with two variants: the standard Kama-2185 model and the Kama-21852 taxi variant. Pre-series assembly began in November 2025 at the Moscow Automobile Plant "Moskvitch", with presales beginning shortly after.

== See also ==
- Kamaz
