= Public information film =

UK government-commissioned short films

Public information films (PIFs) are government-commissioned short films, often shown during television advertising breaks in the United Kingdom. The name is sometimes also applied, faute de mieux, to similar films from other countries, but the US equivalent is the public service announcement (PSA). Public information films were commonplace from the 1950s until the 2000s and covered a variety of topics such as fire safety, safer driving and child abuse. Notable charities and campaigns include the NHS, NSPCC, Fire Kills and Think (stylised THINK!). PIFs are still broadcast to this day but are much less common with the closure of the Central Office of Information in 2011. Public information films are notorious for being particularly brutal and frightening as, in the 70s and 80s, many PIFs were shown in school to warn young children on the dangers of playing on farming equipment and railways.

== Subjects ==
The films advise the public on what to do in a multitude of situations ranging from crossing the road to surviving a nuclear attack. They are sometimes thought to concern only topics related to safety, but there are PIFs on many other subjects, including animal cruelty, protecting the environment, crime prevention, how to vote at a general election or how to fill in a census form.

Many of these films were aimed at children and were shown during breaks in children's programmes during holidays and at weekends. Many of them involved or were narrated by celebrities of the day.

== History ==
The earliest PIFs were made during the Second World War years and shown in cinemas; many were made by and starred Richard Massingham, an amateur actor who set up Public Relationship Films Ltd when he discovered there was no specialist film company in the area. They were commissioned by the Ministry of Information, and Massingham's work has since gained a cult following for their quirky, often humorous tone. After the war, PIFs were produced by the Central Office of Information (now closed), and again by private contractors, which were usually small film companies.

PIFs were supplied to broadcasters free of charge for them to use whenever they wished. Their usefulness as a cost-free means to fill the gaps in fixed-duration commercial breaks left by unsold advertising airtime led to their being used regularly and extensively in the 1960s, 1970s and much of the 1980s, and consequently, within both the COI and broadcasting companies, they were typically known as "fillers". They are still being produced, although the vastly reduced need for broadcasters to turn to third-party filler material to deal with unused airtime during breaks or junctions means they are now only seen rarely. During the late 1990s and early 2000s, they were frequently shown during and in between programmes on ITV in overnight, as advertising was generally difficult to sell during that time. Fillers are still produced and distributed by the Cabinet Office by the Filler Marketing team.

The COI closed on 30 December 2011 after 65 years, and no longer makes PIFs. However, there are a few companies still making distributing PIFs, such as THINK!, Fire Kills, DOE, National Society for the Prevention of Cruelty to Children (NSPCC), and National Rail.

Some advertisements and charity appeals have gained the status of honorary PIF among fans, including Cartoon Boy, a 2002 campaign about child abuse produced by the NSPCC while films such as the 1980s British Gas advertisement about what to do in the event of a gas leak can be considered non-governmental PIFs.

PIFs have a nostalgic cult following and a DVD was released in 2001 called Charley Says: The Greatest Public Information Films in the World, comprising the contents of two earlier VHS releases. A sequel was released in 2005.

Public information films produced by the COI covered a wide range of subjects. The fillers listed above were for domestic consumption. However, COI films was also commissioned by the British Foreign Office to supply films for overseas use. These films dealt with research and development, British products and the British way of life. They were usually distributed through the diplomatic network but not always. Some films were sold commercially to overseas outlets, mostly television.

== Notable public information films ==
- AIDS: Don't Die of Ignorance: A major British information campaign in 1987 with a leaflet delivered to every household in the UK and short public information films 'Monolith' and 'Iceberg', with the doom-laden voice of John Hurt.
- Amber Gambler: A film about the dangers of racing through amber traffic lights before they turn to red.
- Apaches: A public information film shown in primary schools about the dangers of playing on farms. This PIF is notorious for being extremely graphic.
- Charley Says: An animated series of PIFs with a ginger cat called Charley (whose warning growls were voiced by Kenny Everett) who advised children against various dangers they might encounter in their daily lives.
- Menace: a 1970 short film about the dangers of not locking your house at night time. The 30 second short film was narrated by Peter Sallis.
- Children and Disused Fridges: a 1971 PIF about the dangers of children playing and dying in discarded refrigerators. The film became well known due to its frightening message.
- Children and Ponds: a 1979 film warning parents about the dangers of garden ponds to small children. Voice-over by Hywel Bennett.
- Clunk Click Every Trip: A series of films about the importance of seat belts, similar to the US Crash Test Dummies PSAs.
- Cow: A 2008 public information film made by BBC Cymru and Tredegar Comprehensive School about the consequences of texting and driving. The story is about 17-year-old Cassie "Cow" Cowan who causes a car crash due to texting and driving, and causes four deaths, including her two friends riding as her passengers. Cassie herself nearly dies but is revived. In the aftermath of the crash, Cassie's family ended up being ostracised by the local community and ultimately Cassie was sentenced to seven years in prison for death by dangerous driving.
- Drinking and Driving Wrecks Lives: A series of 1980s–1990s PIFs targeting drink-driving offenders. An equally well-known and successful road safety campaign was Clunk Click Every Trip, fronted initially by Shaw Taylor and later by Jimmy Savile.
- Green Cross Code: A character played by David Prowse who advised children about crossing the road safely. An earlier road safety campaign targeted at children featured the animated squirrel "Tufty", and a Tufty Club for young children was later founded.
- Joe and Petunia: A series of animated PIFs about a couple whose amazing stupidity caused dangerous problems for everyone around them. They appeared in only four PIFs ("Coastguard", "Water Safety – Flags", "Country Code" and "Worn Tyres"). They were "resurrected" when "Coastguard" was remade in 2007 with updated references: Petunia is reading Hello! and listening to an iPod; Joe wears a Burberry cap and phones the desktop-PC-using coastguard on his mobile phone.
- Julie: A film about the importance of rear seat belts, which ran for 5 years between 1998 and 2003 with a return in 2007, and was so successful it was adapted for broadcast in France. It was updated with the THINK! logo in 2001.
- Knock-off Nigel: A 2007 copyright infringement campaign of videos about "Nigel", a cheapskate who buys bootleg DVDs, and is ostracized by his peers.
- Lonely Water: A 1973 film warning children of the dangers of foolhardy behaviour around lakes and ponds. The film was shot in horror movie style with a menacing black-robed figure, featuring a memorably chilling voiceover from Donald Pleasence.
- Play Safe: An Electricity safety film from 1978. It shows two main animated characters; a robin (voiced by Bernard Cribbins) and an owl (voiced by Brian Wilde). The robin is looking for a place to perch and lands on the wires of a pylon. The owl who is perching on a tree nearby, berates him for doing something so dangerous, and the robin flies over and perches next to him, promising that he'll play safe in future. This begins their discussion of the golden rule "Play Safe", showing clips of the dangers of being around electricity and ignoring the warning signs, including touching over head power lines, flying kites and other toys around pylons, trespassing in substations and fooling around with electricity itself. The owl concludes "When you have time to kill, make sure time doesn't kill you," with both him and the robin ending with, "Have fun. But keep safe and play safe."
- Powerful Stuff: An Electricity safety film from 1988, based on the same principles as Play Safe.
- Protect and Survive: A series of films (never shown) advising the British public on what to do in the event of a nuclear attack. They would have been shown constantly on all television channels in the build up to a war. Voiced by Patrick Allen.
- Reginald Molehusband: A man (Ian Gardiner) who demonstrated the correct way to park safely. His reverse parking was "a public danger", bets were laid on his performance and people came from all round to watch, until the day he got it right – "Well done! Reginald Molehusband, the safest parker in town." This film is now classified as missing and is not in the archives of either the COI or the private company, which now owns most of its archive footage, although an audio recording still exists. However, a remake was done in 2006, with Gardiner reprising the title role.
- Right to Buy: A 1984 PIF about council tenants who were offered the right to buy their homes at discounted rates.
- Robbie: A film based around a child losing his legs after being struck by a train. A modern equivalent, Killing Time, was shown in secondary schools during the 1990s but was later replaced for, apparently, being too graphic. Robbie replaced the notorious and extremely graphic The Finishing Line. However, Robbie and The Finishing Line are arguably not strictly PIFs, being produced by British Transport Films.
- Stop Look Listen Live: A series of animated PIFs created by copywriter Jack Stephens, about two hedgehogs crossing the road while singing road-safety themed covers of songs like "King of the Road", "Stayin' Alive" and "Ain't Got No Home".

== DVD release ==
Network DVD released two volumes of Charley Says which featured a selection of live action and animated public information films, as well as a DVD release with both volumes 1 and 2 totalling 280 films in total from both volumes.

== Cultural references ==
A number of musical artists have been heavily influenced by the analogue, overdriven sound of British PIFs, including Boards of Canada and most artists on the Ghost Box Records label, especially The Advisory Circle, whose album Other Channels directly references or samples many PIFs, including Keep Warm, Keep Well. Additionally, their debut album features a few reprises with the suffix "PIF".

Another example of PIF influence in music was that of the song Charly by The Prodigy, from 1991, which heavily sampled the meows of Charley Cat. The song Two Tribes by Frankie Goes to Hollywood made use of the sirens from the Protect and Survive films. Similarly the video for Mark Owen song Four Minute Warning contains Protect & Survive references.

The comedian Chris Morris satirised public information films in The Day Today in an episode where there was a constitutional crisis.

== See also ==
- Public service announcement
