= Kama-1 =

Battery electric city car

Overview
- Manufacturer: Kamaz
- Production: 2020 (concept)

Body and chassis
- Class: City car
- Body style: 2-door hatchback
- Layout: Rear engine, rear-wheel drive

Dimensions
- Length: 3,400 mm (134 in)
- Width: 1,700 mm (67 in)
- Height: 1,600 mm (63 in)
- Curb weight: 1,300 kg (2,866 lb)

Chronology
- Successor: Kama Atom

The Kama-1 is a battery electric city car developed by Kamaz. It was completely designed using computer simulation. The Kama-1 was first presented at VUZPROMEXPO-2020.

== History ==
The electric car was primarily developedfor budgetary funds within the framework of the Federal Target Program "Research and Development in Priority Areas of Development of the Scientific and Technological Complex of Russia for 2014-2020" by specialists of the Computer Engineering Center of Peter the Great St. Petersburg Polytechnic University with the support of Kamaz. Work on the creation of a prototype had been carried out since December 2018 and lasted for 2 years.

== Specifications ==
The Kama-1 is a three-door four-seater hatchback. It has an electric motor with a capacity of 109 liters. Power sources are a Chinese-made lithium-ion traction battery with a capacity of 33 kWh, located under the cabin floor. The power reserve is about 200 km (up to 300 km under certain conditions). Express charging from a powerful terminal is provided in 20 minutes.

Some of the exterior elements (wings, sills, bumpers) are made detachable to simplify replacement in case of damage. A 9-inch touch screen is installed on the steering wheel, with the help of which the main settings of the Kama-1 are adjusted. Instead of the instrument panel, a projection screen is located on the windshield and the airbag is located on the ceiling. The model will be equipped with driver assistance elements such as automatic parking, maintaining a distance while driving, tracking markings, automatic braking and steering.
