= Motor vehicle type approval =

EU method for vehicle type approval

Motor vehicle type approval is the method by which motor vehicles, vehicle trailers and systems, components and separate technical units intended for such vehicles achieve type approval in the European Union (EU) or in other UN-ECE member states. There is no EU approval body: authorized approval bodies of member states are responsible for type approval, which will be accepted in all member states.

== History ==
Until 31 August 2020 approval schemes for new motor vehicles and their trailers in the European Union were outlined in Framework Directive 2007/46/EC: (Note: Directive 2007/46/EC of the European Parliament and of the Council of 5 September 2007 establishing a framework for the approval of motor vehicles and their trailers, and of systems, components and separate technical units intended for such vehicles (Framework Directive). No longer in force, Date of end of validity: 31/08/2020; Repealed by 32018R0858.)

- European Community Whole Vehicle Type Approval (ECWVTA) currently applies to passenger cars and motorcycles. On 29 October 2012, ECWVTA was extended to cover all new road vehicles and their trailers.
- United Nations Economic Commission for Europe (UNECE) regulations.
- National Small Series Type Approval (NSSTA) – the key advantages of this scheme are that some technical requirements may be reduced in comparison with ECWVTA; however, the number of vehicles that can be manufactured is limited.
- Individual Vehicle Approval (IVA).

The European Commission can adopt amendments to this Directive which are necessary to lay down technical requirements for small series vehicles, vehicles approved under the individual approval procedure and 'special purpose vehicles'.

UNECE Regulations are part of the EC type-approval of a vehicle in the same way as the separate directives or regulations. They may be applied on a compulsory basis in accordance with Article 4(4) of Decision 97/836/EC by amending the relevant annexes to the Framework Directive.

Automotive EC Directives and ECE Regulations require third party approval – testing, certification and production conformity assessment by an independent body. Each member state is required to appoint an Approval Authority to issue the approvals, and a Technical Service to carry out the testing to the Directives and Regulations.

An approval issued by one Authority will be accepted in all the Member States. If a vehicle is produced in a very small quantity (e.g. M1 maximum 75 per year), single EU Member States can grant exception on a discretionary basis, but the validity of the type approval is limited to the boundaries of those nations which concede to it.

Cornerstones of the type approval process are:

- Application by the vehicle or component manufacturer
- Testing by a technical service
- Granting of the approval by an approval authority
- Conformity of Production by the manufacturer in agreement with the approval authority
- Certificate of Conformity by the manufacturer for the end-user

A particular country's type approval may consist of one or more of the following forms:

- Component type approval – approval of a component that may be fitted to any vehicle (e.g., seat belts, tires, lamps)
- System type approval – approval of a set of components or a performance feature of a vehicle that can only be tested and certified in an installed condition (e.g., restraint system, brake system, lighting system)
- Whole vehicle type approval (WVTA) – approval of a vehicle in its entirety

There are multiple methods of type-approval:

- multi-stage type approval: a procedure whereby one or more Member States certify that, depending on the state of completion, an incomplete or completed type of vehicle satisfies the relevant administrative provisions and technical requirements of the Directive
- step-by-step type approval: a vehicle approval procedure consisting in the step-by-step collection of the whole set of EC type-approval certificates for the systems, components and separate technical units relating to the vehicle, and which leads, at the final stage, to the approval of the whole vehicle
  - mixed type approval: a step-by-step type approval procedure for which one or more system approvals are achieved during the final stage of the approval of the whole vehicle, without it being necessary to issue the EC type approval certificates for those systems
- single-step type approval: a procedure consisting in the approval of a vehicle as a whole by means of a single operation

EC Whole Vehicle Type Approval (also called Pan European Type Approval) is intended to prevent trade barriers, and at the same time guarantee the level of safety and restricted environmental influence of a vehicle. Thanks to that, the car can be registered in each European member state without additional national tests or approval. This harmonisation results in reduced costs and lead time for the manufacturer, importer as well as the consumer. Mandatory compliance date for ECWVTA for M1 vehicles was 29 April 2009. However cars that already have an ECWVTA but are imported from non-EC countries often need to be re-approved when entering the EC.

In the United Kingdom, this function is performed by the Vehicle Certification Agency (VCA). This body has the power to issue International Organization for Standardization (ISO) certifications. Following Brexit, EU regulations relating to type approval continue to apply in the UK as retained EU law, but UK type approvals are no longer automatically recognized in the EC.

The Individual Vehicle Approval (IVA) had been used increasingly as a loophole to import politically unwanted vehicles, like large pickup trucks from the United States, into the European Union. From 2900 vehicle imports by IVA in 2019, the number rose to 6800 in 2022. Citing the increased danger these vehicles pose for others in accidents and the exemption of IVA from strict EU climate standards, the European Commission was working on an update of IVA in 2024.

The Framework Directive is no longer in force (end of validity: 31 August 2020). It has been repealed by Regulation (EU) 2018/858 of 30 May 2018.

After the United Kingdom's exit from the European Union, Regulation (EU) 2018/858 was kept and adapted in the UK vehicle type-approval regime. Following the Windsor Framework, EU type-approval rules remain applicable in Northern Ireland, and Great Britain has its own GB type-approval scheme.

== COC number ==
Following type approval, a vehicle is issued with a Certificate of Conformity which includes a COC number. This number may look like: e13*2001/116*0260 where e13 is the UNECE state number (in this case Luxembourg), 2001/116 is the EC/EU directive name.

== Electric vehicles ==
Type approval for electric vehicles is governed by Regulation No 100 of the Economic Commission for Europe of the United Nations (UNECE) – Uniform provisions concerning the approval of battery electric vehicles with regard to specific requirements for the construction, functional safety and hydrogen emission.

== See also ==
- Retrofitting
- National Highway Traffic Safety Administration
