= Julie (1998 film) =

1998 film about seatbelt use

- Release date: 1998
- Country: United Kingdom

Julie, also known as Julie knew her killer, is a British public information film (PIF) about the importance of wearing a seatbelt in the rear of a car. It ran on national television from 1998 to 2003, and was so successful it was also shown in France, Germany and Australia, as well as being remade by Royal Dutch Shell for broadcast in Libya.

The safety commercial ran several months each year as part of the "THINK!" campaign, which is run by the Department for Transport, and is listed among the hardest-hitting safety adverts of the "last 30 years". The campaign was an "IPA Advertising Effectiveness Award" winner and increased the usage of rear seat belts in the United Kingdom by 11% saving 18 lives per year.

== Plot ==
Julie is driving her two teenage children in a red Vauxhall Cavalier Mark III to school. She and her daughter are wearing their seatbelts in the front, but her young son sat behind her is not. A voiceover announces: "Like most victims, Julie knew her killer." Julie becomes preoccupied with a tailgating Ford Transit Mark II and neglects to concentrate on the road ahead. When the van turns into a side road, she looks forward but too late to avoid crashing into a parked Vauxhall Astra Mark II.

Her son, who is sitting directly behind her, is thrown forward, killing her instantly as her skull is smashed in by his forehead. The voiceover continues: "It was her son, who was sitting behind her without a seatbelt. After crushing her to death, he sat back down."

The film ends with her dead body lying across the wheel. Her daughter is screaming in the front passenger seat while her son slumps back into his seat with only a bleeding nasal fracture, confused as to what just happened.

== Reception ==
It originally carried the slogan "Belt up in the back. For everyone's sake." and later "Think! Always wear a seatbelt."

Since 5 November 2007, Think! have begun airing the PIF in a shorter, 30-second advert.
