= Bohse Eurostar =

Bohse EuroStar
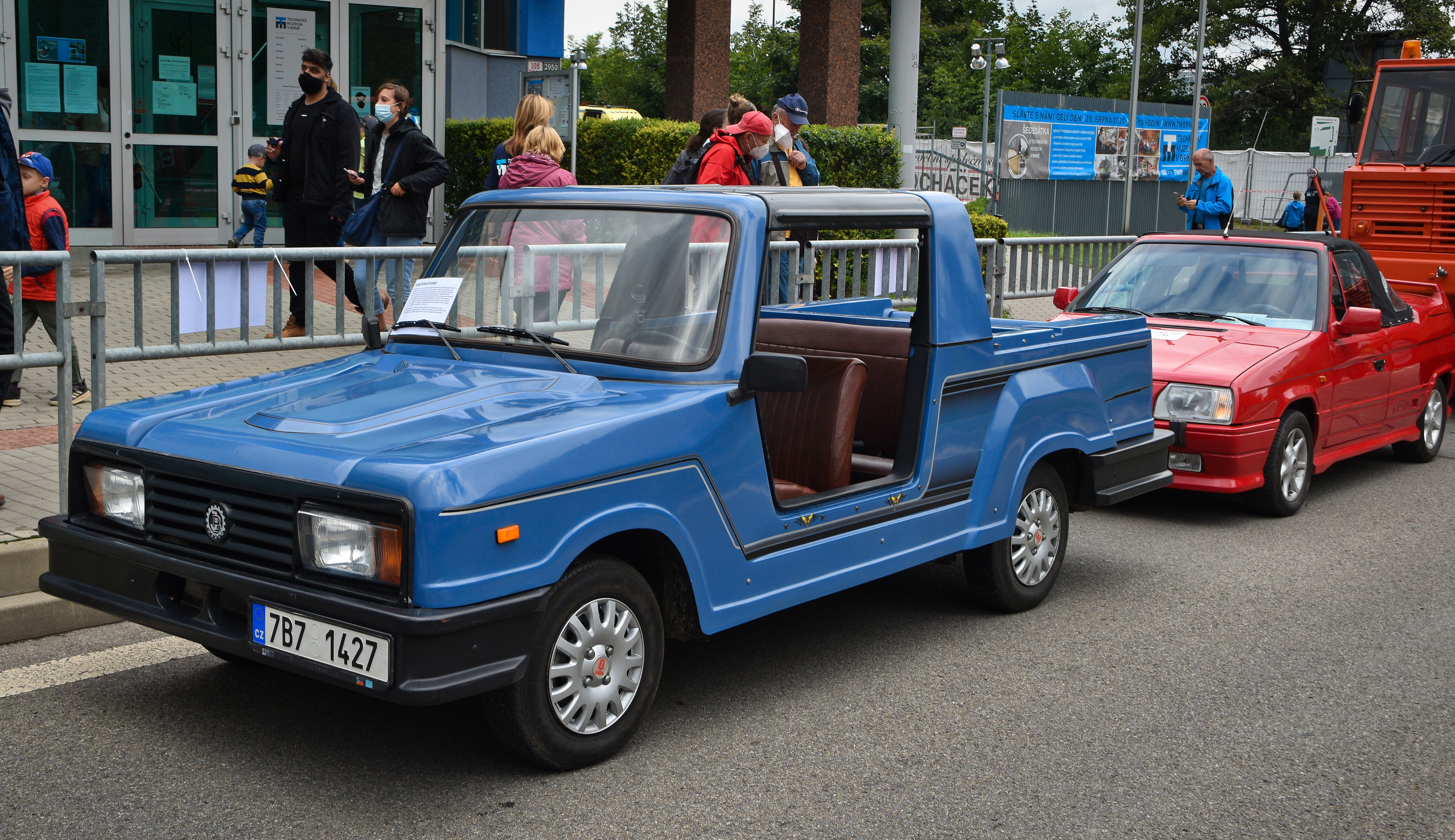
- 1990 Bohse Eurostar at the Brno Technical Museum in the Czech Republic

Overview
- Manufacturer: Bohse Automobilbau
- Also called: Bohse Sprinter; Lada Bohse BD60L
- Production: 1987–1989 (230 produced)

Body and chassis
- Layout: FR layout
- Related: Lada Riva

Dimensions
- Wheelbase: 2424 mm (95.4 in)

The Bohse Eurostar is a German car produced by Bohse Automobilbau from 1987 to 1989. The first EuroStars were built in 1987 and based on the Volkswagen Golf Mk1. These were still offered under the name Bohse Sprinter and only 30 were produced. The later EuroStar models were based on the Lada Riva and 200 were built in 1988 and 1989.

== Design ==
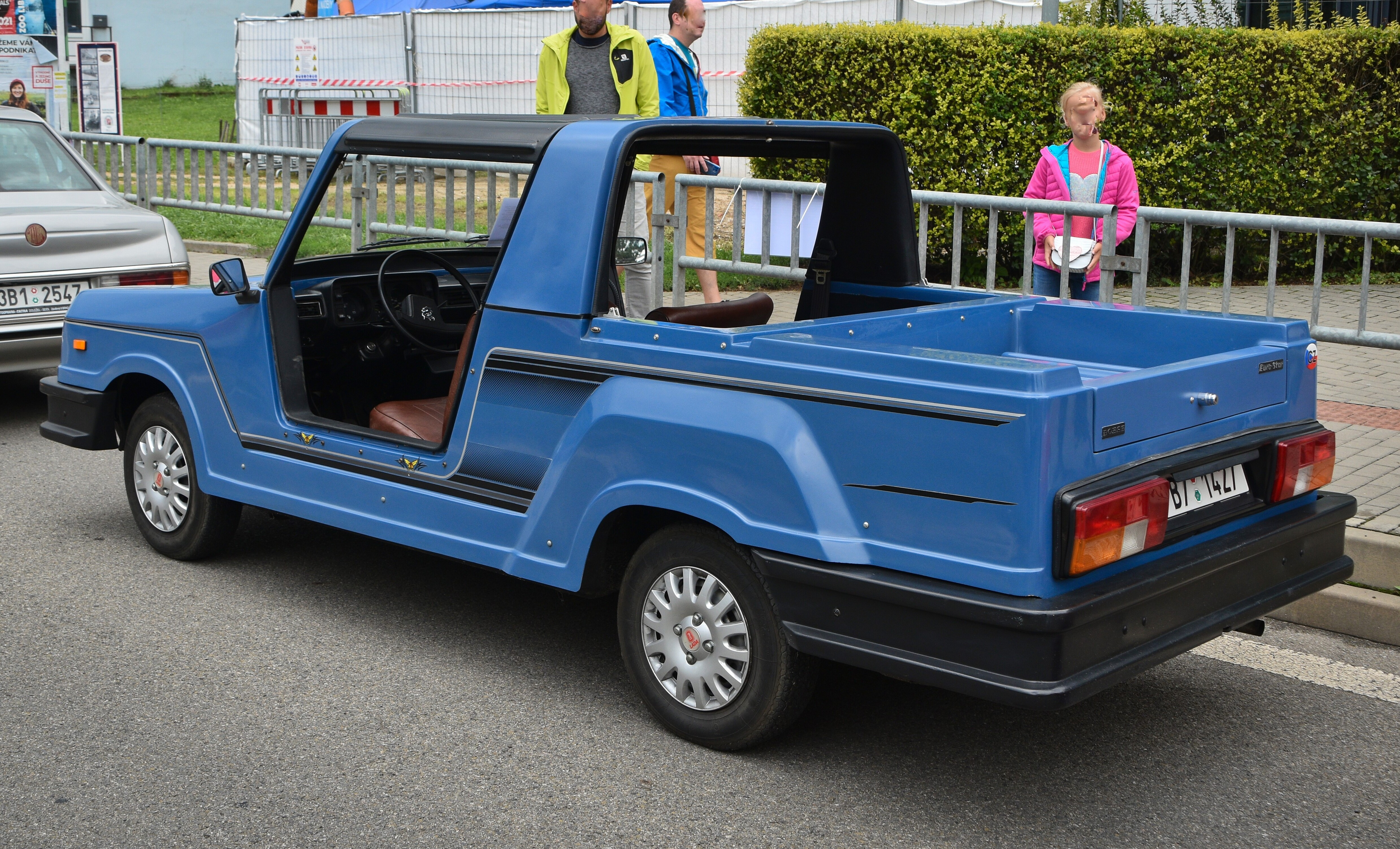
1990 Eurostar rear view

The EuroStar is based on the Lada 2105, and has been converted into an open leisure vehicle with a custom polyester body. The EuroStar has no doors, instead using large fabric panels. There is no rear window either as it has been replaced by a removable fabric panel. The EuroStar features two removable targa roof panels held down by rubber bands and has both a pickup bed and a small enclosed trunk in the rear. Mechanically, the EuroStar uses the same running gear as the Lada. Both the EuroStar and Sprinter shared the same body, with the only exterior difference being the headlights and taillights.
