= Rules for traffic lights =

Traffic lights – devices positioned at road intersections, pedestrian crossings and other locations – control flows of traffic with social norms and laws created by the state. Traffic signals have to convey messages to drivers in a short period of time about constantly-changing road rules.

== Blocking a traffic light junction ==
In some jurisdictions (such as New York City), there are ordinances or by-laws against "gridlocking". A motorist entering an intersection (even if on a green light) but unable to proceed and who gets stranded in the intersection (when traffic ahead fails to proceed), and who remains after the light turns red (thus blocking traffic from other directions) may be cited. The definition of the intersection area is a square where the two streets overlap marked by the inner lines of each crosswalk. (Occupying the space inside the crosswalk lines is itself a traffic infraction, but different from gridlocking.) This gives meaning to the anti-gridlock slogan "don't block the box". This is sometimes used as a justification for making a turn across the opposing travel lanes on a red light at a busy intersection, by pulling partway into the intersection at a green light waiting to perform the turn, and, if oncoming traffic is not abated before the light changes to red, proceeding to turn once the light has turned red and opposing traffic has stopped. This means that at busy junctions without a protected green arrow for turning traffic, one turns after the light turns red. This maneuver is commonly referred to as "occupying the intersection" or "being legally allowed to complete one's turn". In some jurisdictions, including most American states, a vehicle already in the intersection when the light turns red legally has the right of way, and vehicles who have green must yield to the vehicle in the intersection.

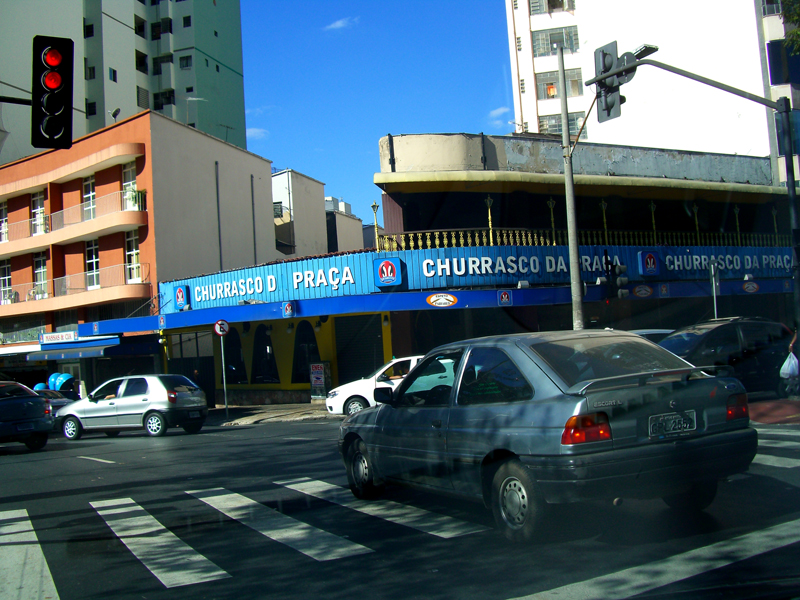
A driver comes to a stop on the crosswalk beyond the stop line as a result of attempting to avoid a red light violation.

In Sackville, New Brunswick, it is customary for through traffic to voluntarily yield to the first oncoming left-turning vehicle to allow it to perform a "Pittsburgh left" manoeuvre. This is similar to a hook turn performed in Melbourne, Australia, which is legal at signed intersections.

Enforcement of traffic lights is done in one of several ways:

- by police officers observing traffic, and issuing citations to motorists who violate the signal
- as a result of an accident investigation, if it is determined that one or more motorists ran the red light – even if the incident was not observed by a police officer
- with red light cameras.

== Red lights ==
=== Red light running ===
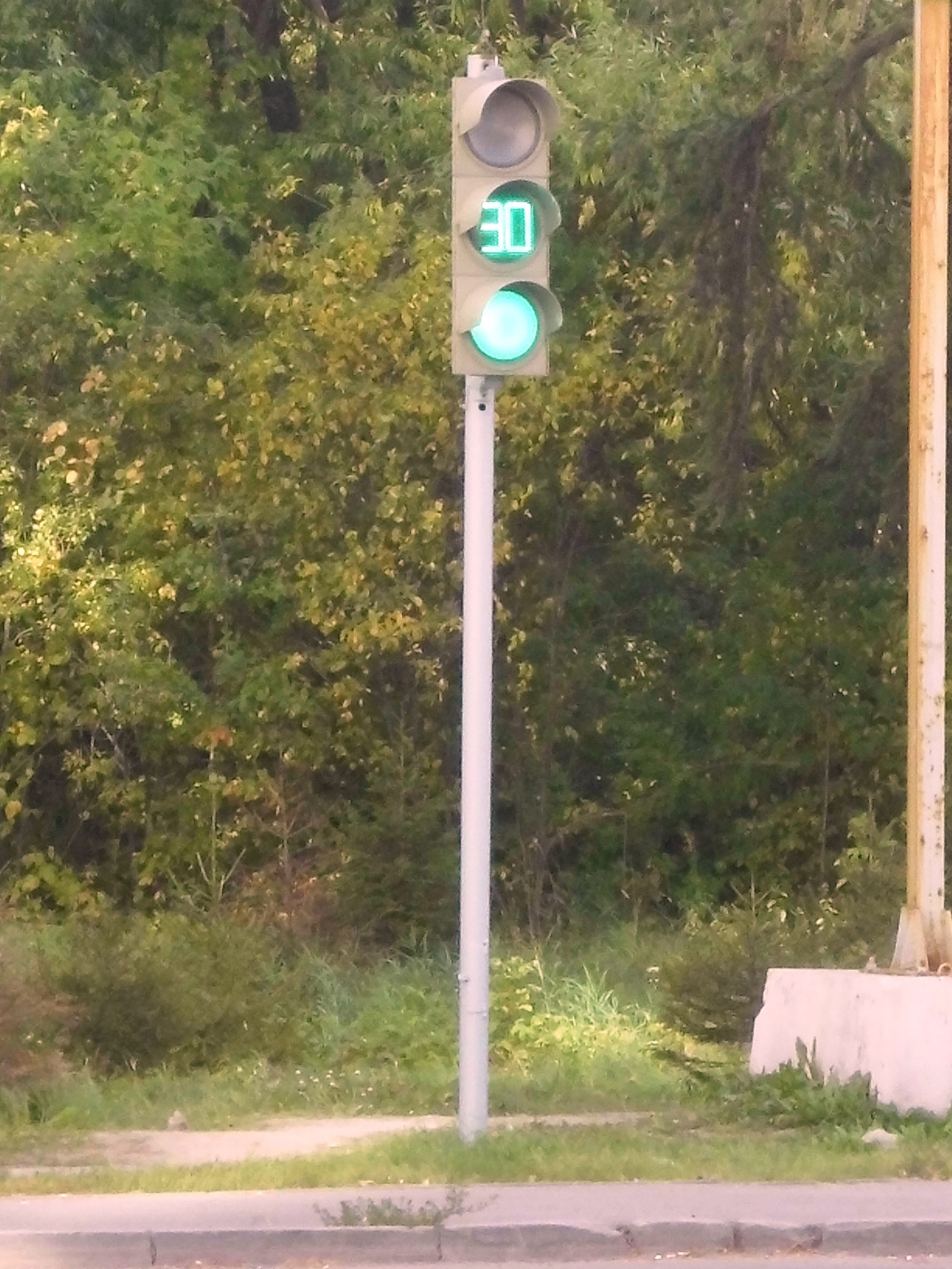
Traffic light in Chelyabinsk, Russia, showing a green light with a digital countdown (in the centre aspect) of the time left until the signal switches to amber

Red light running occurs when a motorist enters a junction any time after the signal light turns red unless a legal turn on red manoeuvre is completed. A US national survey in 2019 found that 86% of drivers thought it was very dangerous to run a red light at speed, but 31% reported that they had done so in the past 30 days.	AAA, 2017, In the past month, how often have you seen (Drivers running red lights)? (N=2613). View chart definition.

==== Reasons and impacts ====
Common reasons for red light running include inattentive driving, following an oversized vehicle, or during inclement weather. Drivers are more likely to run red lights during peak traffic hours or if the signal is on a downward slope.Uber had to apologise in 2016 after a self-driving Uber vehicle ran a red light "due to human error" in San Francisco. Red light runners involved in multiple-vehicle crashes are more likely male, younger, involved in prior crashes, or have alcohol-impaired driving convictions. According to the IIHS Insurance Institute for Highway Safety, every year red light running causes hundreds of deaths, thousands of injuries, and hundreds of millions of dollars in related costs.

In Spring 2015, Hunter College in New York City completed an observational study of red light running, the first of its kind. The conclusion, after monitoring 3,259 vehicles at 50 intersections over a period of days around the 5 boroughs, found that almost 10% of vehicles and 15% of taxis ran the red light, amounting to nearly 400,000 red lights run every single day.

People killed at red light in the USA. View chart definition.

Source: IIHS

==== Mitigations ====
Red light running can be deterred through enforcement or engineering strategies. It is normally illegal and may incur a fine, demerit points, or a stricter sentence. As of 2021, Norway has the highest fine in Europe for red light running at €756 equivalent. The US Federal Highway Administration recommends that engineers:

- improve signal visibility (better signal placement, increased signal size or improved line of sight);
- improve signal conspicuity (to better capture the motorist's attention);
- increase the likelihood of stopping (with signal head signs, advance-warning flashers or rumble strips); and
- address intentional violations (through signal optimisation, properly timed amber-change intervals, and all-red clearance intervals).

After the Hunter College study, New York City Mayor Bill de Blasio launched a Vision Zero plan to reduce vehicular and pedestrian fatalities. The New York City Police Department's 2014 TrafficStat report showed 33,577 red light tickets for 2013, which is a 126% increase in the number of failure-to-yield summonses and red-light running violations.

=== Turn on red ===
Some jurisdictions, particularly in North America, permit drivers to make a kerb-to-kerb turn (i.e. not crossing other traffic streams) at a red light, provided they first come to a complete stop and give way to other traffic and pedestrians. The rule has been criticised for endangering pedestrians, and some highway authorities have banned turning on red at specific junctions.

== Amber lights ==
In some jurisdictions, amber light running may also be illegal, unless a driver cannot stop before the stop line safely. For example, this rule is in place in states within Australia, Russia (which also has a flashing green phase and possibly countdown timers to warn drivers of an amber phase), and the UK.

The Amber Gambler Twins is one of many public interest films trying to change the public's behaviour regarding the running of amber lights.

== Hook turn ==
A hook turn, or two-stage turn, is generally used to allow lighter vehicles such as cycles or motorcycles to turn across oncoming traffic. Such vehicles when permitted can move to the nearside of the junction and position themselves in front of side road traffic, waiting for the side road traffic to gain a green signal before completing the turn. In Australia, such turns were the standard right turn until the 1950s. Hook turns remaining in Australia are generally in the Melbourne central city area to ensure cars do not wait on centre-lane tram tracks and delay trams.

== Inactive lights ==
Traffic light failure in most jurisdictions in Australia and countries in Europe must be handled by drivers as a priority-to-the-right intersection, or an all-way stop elsewhere, pending the arrival of a police officer to direct traffic. In Armenia, Belarus, Belgium, Bosnia and Herzegovina, Croatia, Czech Republic, Estonia, France, Georgia, Germany, Greece, Iceland, Italy, Kazakhstan, Kosovo, Latvia, Lithuania, Luxembourg, Moldova, Netherlands, Poland, Portugal, Romania, Russia, Serbia, Slovakia, Slovenia, Sweden, Switzerland (and Liechtenstein), Turkey, and Ukraine, traffic lights may have additional right-of-way signs mounted above, below or next to the traffic lights; these take effect when the lights are no longer active or are flashing amber. A flashing amber traffic light usually indicates you have a yield or stop sign as a redundant sign, while a turned-off traffic light usually indicates you have the right-of-way. In the UK and parts of North America, drivers simply treat the junction as being uncontrolled when traffic lights fail, giving way as appropriate, unless a police officer is present. In much of the United States failed traffic signals must be treated as all-way stop intersections.

In the US, traffic lights inactive at night time emit an amber-coloured flashing signal in directions owing priority while the intersecting street emits a flashing red light, requiring drivers to stop before proceeding.

== Enforcement ==
=== Red light cameras ===
In some countries, red light cameras are used for either the driver or the vehicle's owner. An automated camera is connected to the triggering mechanism for the corresponding traffic light, which is programmed to photograph a vehicle and driver crossing against the light. Either the driver or the vehicle's owner (depending on the locale) are fined for the violation. In some jurisdictions, including the United States and Italy, private companies have been contracted to operate traffic-related cameras and receive a portion of the resulting revenues. In some cases, red light cameras have been abused by local governments, where vehicle operators have been fined as a result of traffic systems that have been improperly modified. Despite the fact that cameras can reduce the number of crashes, it has been proven that at these intersections drivers tended to react quicker to an amber light change when stopping. The consequence of this change could be a slight decline in the intersection capacity.

Red light cameras in New South Wales, Australia, are activated only if a motorist enters an intersection 0.3 seconds after the light has turned red.

=== Confirmation lights ===
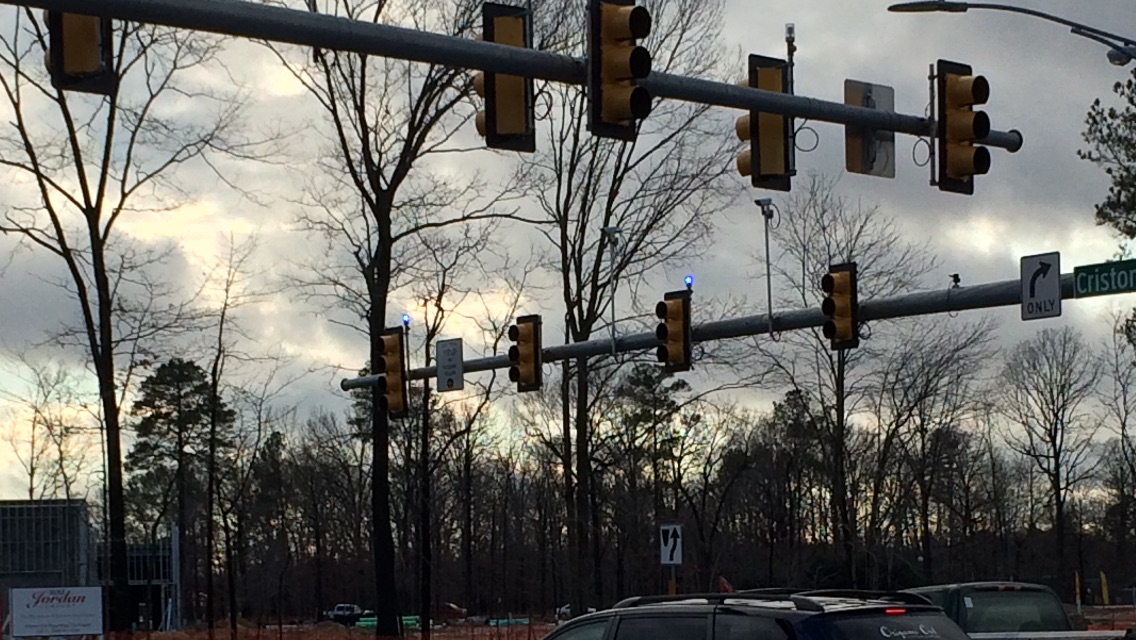
An intersection with blue confirmation lights in Newport News, Virginia

Another way police officers have begun to combat red light runners is with blue or white Confirmation Lights. These lights can be seen from any angle in an intersection and are typically utilised by emergency responders who actuate traffic signal preemption devices to verify that other motorists are facing a red signal. However, confirmation lights also assist officers – who do not have to have a line of sight with a red light – to catch vehicles illegally entering an intersection. They are only lit when the red light on the same signal head is on. Some intersections will also have multiple confirmation lights for a single direction of travel if there are different signals for different directions. These lights are separate from the main ones, often protruding above or below the main traffic light, and are much smaller than a standard light to help avoid confusion.

In the Netherlands, many red traffic signals can be seen from the side via a small bulbous window, indicating to drivers (and police officers) whether the signal in the crossing direction is actually red or not, by simply leaking out some of the red light through the side of the traffic signal. This has gradually become less common as traditional incandescent signals are replaced by LED signals, while increasingly red light cameras are used to detect driving-through-red violations.
