= Joe and Petunia =

British public information film series

Joe and Petunia is a four part series of public information films from the UK. The series was made by Nicholas Cartoons, which was also responsible for the 1981 television series Willo the Wisp. The films were animated and featured Joe, a tiny little man in pinstripes, and Petunia, his wife who wore a hat and sunglasses. The voices were played by Wendy Craig as Petunia, later replaced by Brigit Forsyth for the last film, and Peter Hawkins as Joe. In each film, they cause danger with their avoidable accidents, advising the public on what not to do in a similar situation.

== Films ==
The public information films these characters appeared in were:

- Coastguard - Joe and Petunia are on holiday, enjoying a picnic on a clifftop. Joe is watching the sea through binoculars when he sees a man in trouble on his boat, but assumes that, like them, he is simply enjoying himself and, when he struggles to stay afloat, Joe waves back ("Lovely day, in't it?"). Eventually, the man shouts to them "HELP! DIAL 9-9-9 AND ASK FOR THE COASTGUARD!" Joe reads these instructions in a speech bubble above the man's head, and, realising what's happening, he rushes to a phone box to summon help. The man holds on to the end of the speech bubble and floats out of the water, reminding the audience "If you see a boat you think may be in distress, dial 9-9-9 and ask for the coastguard!"
  The "Coastguard" film was shown on UK screens for a limited run from May 2006 to celebrate the 60th anniversary of the Central Office of Information. It was digitally remastered and "updated" to give it a more modern look - in the new film, Joe has a mobile phone, Petunia listens to an iPod and the coastguard now uses a computer.
- Flags - Still at the seaside, Joe sees a beautiful mermaid in the water and wants to go in, but Petunia tells him he can't because there is a sign nearby telling people not to swim. They move down the beach, but it's not safe there either, because a red flag is on display, warning that the sea is too rough. Finally, they find an area patrolled by lifeguards, and Petunia tells Joe it is safe to swim now, but having seen the lifeguard swimming away with the mermaid, Joe has changed his mind.
- Country Code - While on a country walk, Joe and Petunia stop for a rest and discuss their walk, with Joe throwing rocks from a wall nearby: They have left tracks all through a corn field, have released some cows through a gate Joe opened, marked "Private" and their dog is now chasing sheep in the field behind them. Just then, one of the stones Joe throws shatters a bottle, much to his delight. They then see a farmer with a purple face (which they attribute to "all that country air") and think he is doing a country dance as he jumps up and down in fury. Petunia remarks that he doesn't look friendly (to which Joe says "Can't be anything we've done"), and they leave. The farmer looks out at the trail of damage they have left, and sighs "When folk go out to the country, why oh why can't they follow The Country Code?"
- Worn Tyres – The last film featuring Joe and Petunia. On a mountain drive in their Mini, Petunia sees a notice board advising that "Worn Tyres Kill", and repeatedly asks Joe whether he has checked their tyres. He tries to evade the question, then says they're not worn, they're "a bit smooth". Petunia is relieved, but then her expression turns into horror as the car skids and crashes into a tree. Joe and Petunia slump down in the car and disappear from view; the cartoon image then changes to a shot of a real car accident, cutting to a close-up of the tire. A caption states "WORN TYRES KILL" as we hear Joe's and Petunia's echoing voices repeating the words from the start of the film: "Nice view up here, Petunia." "Yes, very nice, Joe.", implying that Joe and Petunia have indeed died.

== Legacy ==
=== Remaster ===
The films were remastered in 2006 to commemorate the Central Office of Information's 60th anniversary and one film was publicly played each week. There was then a vote on which film was the best out of each of them.

=== Relation to Harry Potter franchise ===
Harry Potter author J.K. Rowling states that the character of Petunia from these films may have subconsciously inspired the naming of Harry Potter's maternal aunt, Petunia Dursley, writing on Pottermore that:

"'Petunia' is the name that I always gave unpleasant female characters in games of make believe I played with my sister, Di, when we were very young. Where I got it, I was never sure, until recently a friend of mine played me a series of public information films that were shown on television when we were young ... One of them was an animation in which a married couple sat on a cliff enjoying a picnic and watching a man drowning in the sea below ... The husband called his wife Petunia, and I suddenly wondered whether that wasn't where I had got this most unlikely name, because I have never met anybody called Petunia, or, to my knowledge, read about them. ... The cartoon Petunia was a fat, cheery character, so all I seem to have taken is her name."
