= Amber Gambler =

1967 British Public Information Film

Frame from the film

Amber Gambler is a metaphorical phrase and the title of a 1967 British public information film (PIF), about the dangers of speeding through traffic lights before the amber changes to red "when there is ample time to stop", or in advance of it turning to green.

The Amber Gambler Twins is one of many public interest films trying to change the public's behaviour. It tries to induce a reflective moment leading to an "I see" epiphany.

== Plot ==
As a voice-over narrates, a man is seen driving and ignoring amber traffic light signals, until the odds catch up with him and he strikes another "amber gambler". In getting out of his car to confront the other driver, the camera pulls back to reveal that the other person is himself.

The phrase has been popularly used to succinctly describe high risk driving behaviors that enhance the likelihood of automobile collisions, damage, injury and death. It characterizes amber gambling as racing through amber lights at one end of the cycle or the other.

== Other uses ==
In the early 1990s, the term became popular with ufologists in describing mysterious orange lights sighted around crop circle sites.

The term was used during the COVID-19 pandemic to refer to holidaymakers arranging travel to restricted destinations in the hope that the restrictions were lifted before or during their holiday.

== See also ==
- Red light running
- Driving without due care and attention
