= Driving in the United Kingdom =

Driving in the United Kingdom is governed by various legal powers and in some cases is subject to the passing of a driving test. The government produces a Highway Code that details the requirements for all road users, including drivers. Unlike most other countries in the world, UK traffic drives on the left.

== Speed limits ==
British roads are limited for most vehicles by the National Speed Limit. Road signs in the UK use imperial units, so speed limits are posted in miles per hour. Speed limits are the maximum speed at which certain drivers may legally drive on a road rather than a defined appropriate speed, and in some cases the nature of a road may dictate that one should drive significantly more slowly than the speed limit may allow. This restricts some to a default speed limit of 30 mph on lit roads, and some light vehicles to 60 mph on single carriageways and 70 mph on dual carriageways and motorways, with some large vehicles or some of those towing trailers subject to reduced limits on some roads depending on the class of both road and vehicle. Sections of road subject to the national or in-town speed limit only require limit marker signs at the start of a section, without repeaters, provided street lights are or are not present as appropriate. Lower speed limits of 20 mph, 30 mph, 40 mph, 50 mph and 60 mph can also be used on roads in the UK where it is deemed that the national or 30 mph urban speed limit is inappropriate, with repeater signs posted at regular intervals.

== Dipped headlights ==
Dipped headlights were trialled in Birmingham, England from March 11 1962 for two weeks. Previous to this, many drivers drove with sidelights only, in low visibility. From October 29 1962 this trial was 22 weeks until late March 1963.

From December 1962 Cheshire and East Lancashire had a two week trial, and again in late October 1963 to late March 1964. Liverpool had a trial from late September 1963 for six months. By September 1964, the government was looking at a law change. Manchester and Glasgow had joined by late 1965.

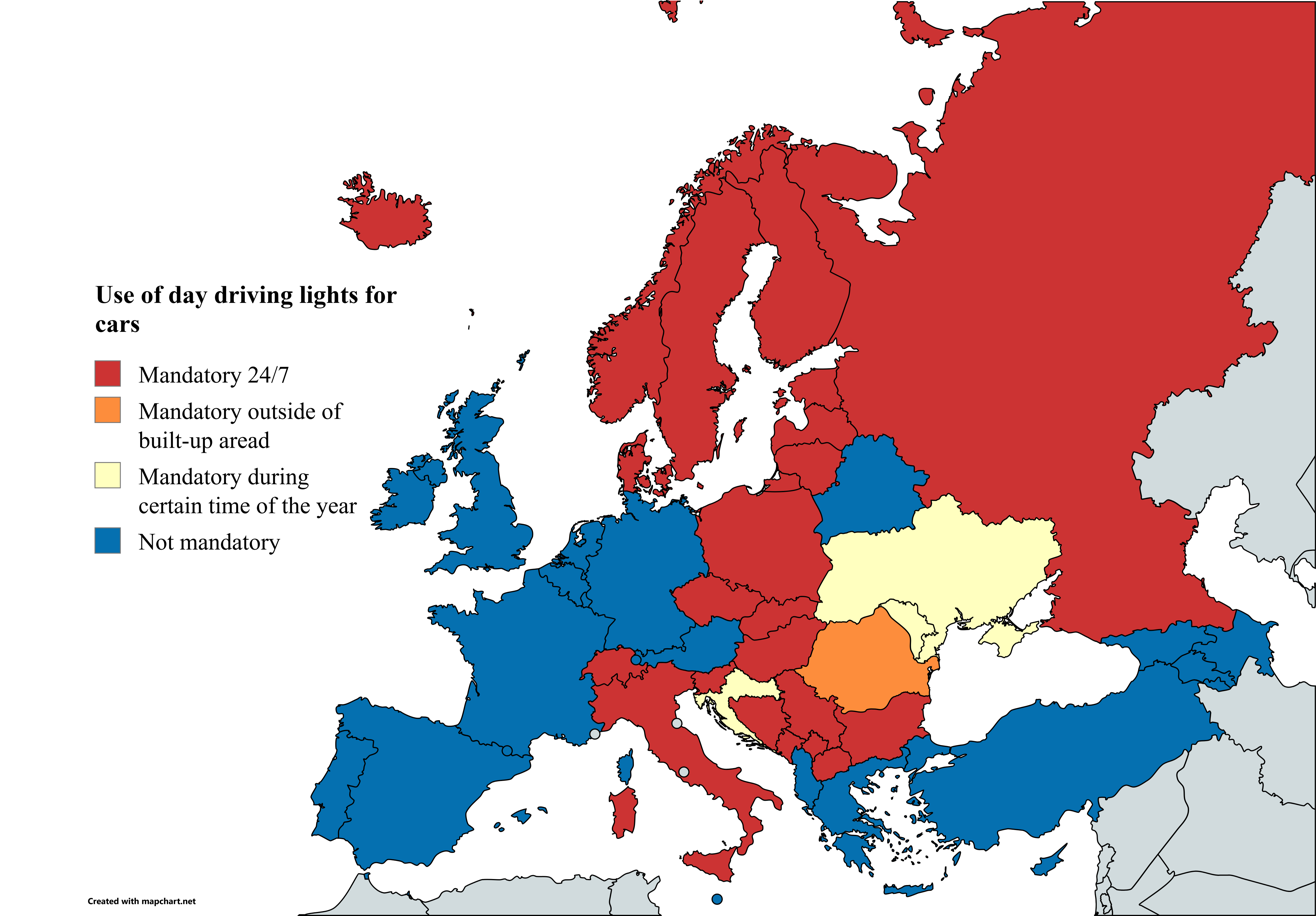
Daytime running lights across Europe

By mid-May 1967 a government report looked at dipped lights; it found that one-third of drivers did not drive with dipped lights, but it did not advise dipped lights. Sweden had drivers who drove with dipped lights in the day. In July 1968, dipped headlights were to be compulsory from late 1968. From 1975, new Volvo cars in the UK drove with lights always on.

In late October John Gilbert, Baron Gilbert wanted to make dipped lights compulsory from November 17 1975, although it was withdrawn, but by 1981 it was law for drivers to have dipped headlights in low visibility. In December 1983, from 1986 there was to be no sidelights only. But in July 1988, the European Court of Justice overturned this rule.

== Lane discipline ==
Drivers on multilane roads are legally required to use the left-most lane unless overtaking other vehicles on the road, unless signs or road markings indicate that the left-most lane(s) is only for traffic leaving at the next junction. Drivers who wish to overtake a slower vehicle are thus expected to move out from their lane (having used the indicator lights to warn other road-users of their intention to do so), pass the slower vehicle and return to the left-most lane. This enables faster traffic to overtake unhindered if it wishes to do so. On the UK's busiest roads, where there may be four or more lanes in each direction, there is often a situation where overtaking becomes continual as each successive lane moves at a slightly faster speed than that to its left.

On some motorways a lane is provided on the left hand side referred to as the 'hard shoulder', which should only be used when a vehicle has broken down. It is illegal to drive in this lane unless indicated otherwise, for example Dynamic Hard Shoulder Running (DHSR) Smart Motorways allow motorists to use the hard shoulder at peak times.

The action of undertaking, where the driver moves to the left of a slower moving vehicle to get past it is, although not illegal, discouraged on motorways under Highway Code 268. This rule allows for undertaking to occur in conditions that cause the left-hand lane to move faster than the right-hand lane and for traffic to keep up with the flow of the lane.

== Pedestrian crossings ==
There are two broad categories of pedestrian crossing to aid the safe passage across major roads by those travelling on foot. There are no laws against jaywalking in the UK.

- Traffic Light Controlled Crossings: Traffic is controlled by traffic light signals.
- Uncontrolled Crossings: Zebra and Parallel crossings give Pedestrians & cyclists in addition at Parallel crossings priority over traffic. These are marked using Black and white stripes are painted on the road and flashing amber Belisha beacons are on each side of the road. Drivers must give way to pedestrians & cyclists on the crossing.

== Driving licence ==
Driving licences may be obtained by any UK resident over the age of 17, subject to certain conditions. Initially, a provisional licence is issued, which restricts the holder to driving whilst accompanied by a driver who is at least 21 years old, who has held a full licence in the category of vehicle they are supervising the learner driver in for at least three years, The provisional licence may be exchanged for a full licence after the holder has passed the practical driving test. Upon reaching the age of 70, drivers may apply to have their licences renewed with their doctors' permission.

Many foreign driving licences permit one to drive in the UK, but must be exchanged for British licences after a year. Drivers from the USA, however, must take a British test if they wish to drive in the UK for more than a year after arriving in the country (with the exception of US military personnel stationed in the UK for a set period of time are allowed to drive on their US licence After completing their third Air Force licence training course.). This is because US driver licensing is carried out by individual states, but the US Constitution does not permit individual states to enter bilateral treaties with other sovereign governments. However driving licences from the European Union, Norway, Iceland, Liechtenstein and Switzerland are valid in the United Kingdom.

== Enforcement ==
Some of the rules of the road should be enforced by the police, others are enforced by council wardens. Speed cameras are common. Red-light and bus lane cameras are also used. Motorists convicted of certain traffic, and certain non-traffic offences may have "points" added to their licences: some traffic offences such as exceeding the speed limit by a small amount, typically warrant three points, and motorists with twelve points face a driving ban, although this is six points for new drivers. Normally the points for a speeding offence, driving through a red light or in a bus lane will be punished with points from 3-6 whilst driving using a mobile phone is 6.

== See also ==
- Highway Code
- Motorways
- Roundabouts
- Driving Standards Agency
- European Driving Licence
