= Lada Riva =

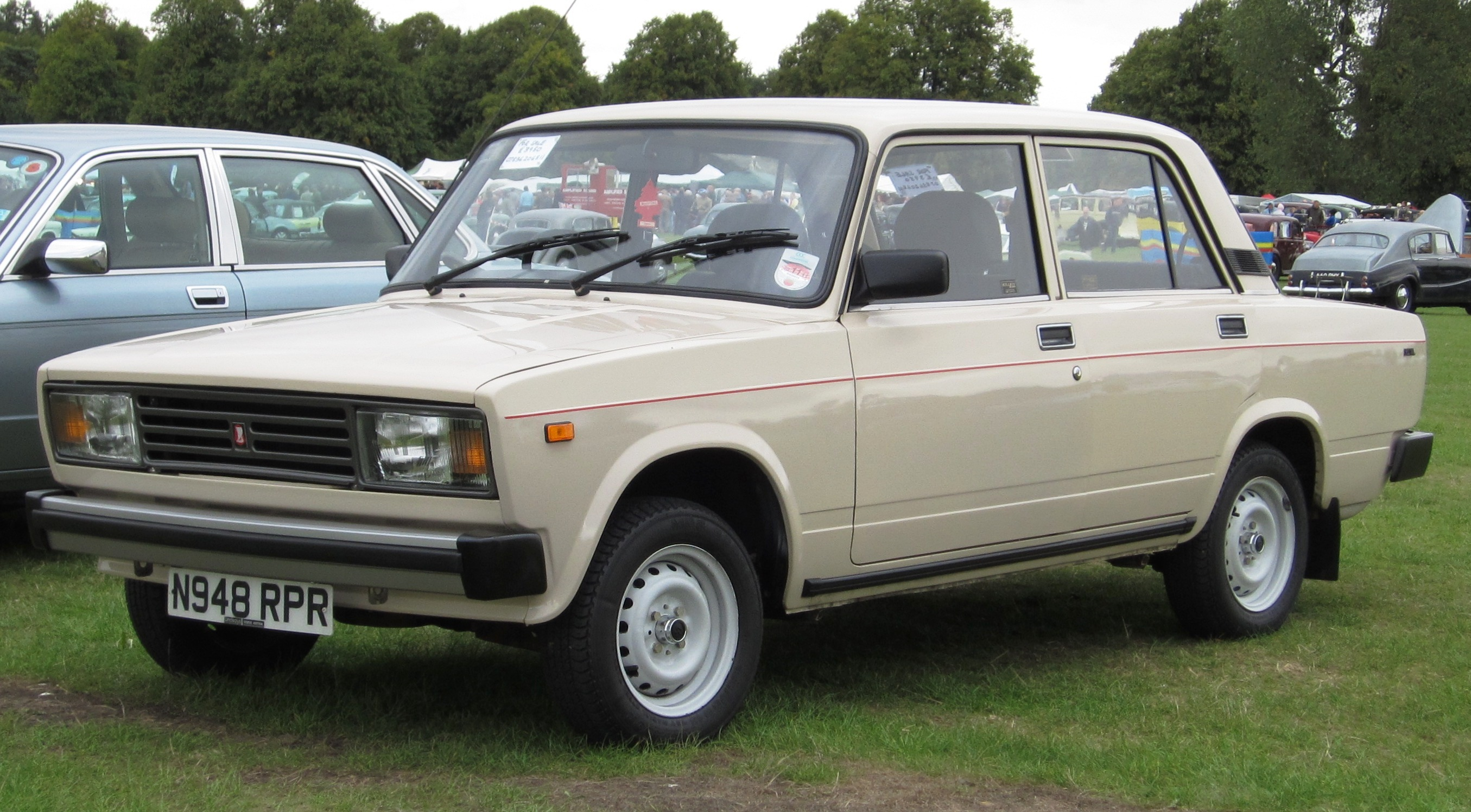
- Lada Riva (VAZ 2105)

Overview
- Manufacturer: AvtoVAZ
- Also called: Dennis / Lada Signet (Canada); Lada 1500 (Colombia, Canada); Lada 2104 / VAZ 2104; Lada 2105 / VAZ 2105; Lada 2107 / VAZ 2107; Lada Classic; Lada Clásico (Ecuador); Lada Nova (Denmark & West Germany); Lada Kalinka (France, East Germany, Portugal, Spain); Lada Laika (Argentina & Brazil); Lada Riva (Yugoslavia, UK, NZ); Lada Sputnik (Cuba)
- Production: 2105: 1980–December 2010; 2107: 1982–September 2012 (until 2015 in Egypt); 2104: 1984–September 2012
- Assembly: Russia: Tolyatti (AvtoVAZ); Russia: Izhevsk (IzhAvto); Russia: Argun (Chechen Avto); Egypt: 6th of October City; Egypt: Cairo (Alamal Group: 2002–2015); Kazakhstan: Ust-Kamenogorsk (Azia Avto); Ukraine: Cherkasy, Ukraine (Bogdan); Ukraine: Kherson (Anto-Rus); Ukraine: Kremenchuk (KrASZ); Ukraine: Lutsk (LuAZ); Ukraine: Zaporizhia (ZAZ)

Body and chassis
- Class: Compact car
- Body style: 2-door pickup; 4-door saloon; 5-door estate
- Layout: Front-engine, rear-wheel-drive
- Related: Bohse Eurostar; Fiat 124; Izh 27175; SEAT 124; VIS-234500

Powertrain
- Engine: petrol: 1.2 L VAZ-2101 I4; 1.3 L VAZ-2105 I4; 1.5 L VAZ-2103/2104 I4; 1.6 L VAZ-2106 I4; 1.7 L VAZ-2107 I4; diesel: 1.5 L VAZ-341 I4
- Transmission: 4/5-speed manual; 4-speed automatic

Dimensions
- Wheelbase: 2,424 mm (95.4 in)
- Length: 4,145 mm (163.2 in)
- Width: 1,620 mm (63.8 in)
- Height: 1,435 mm (56.5 in)

Chronology
- Predecessor: VAZ-2101; VAZ-2102; VAZ-2106
- Successor: VAZ-2109; VAZ-2110; VAZ-2111

The Lada / VAZ-2105, 2104 and 2107, collectively marketed as Lada Riva for right-hand drive models (in the United Kingdom and New Zealand), the Lada Nova in Germany, and by multiple other names and markets, are a series of compact sedans of the Zhiguli line-up (Fiat 124-based cars), built by Russian car manufacturer AvtoVAZ (formerly VAZ). Introduced in 1979 in the Soviet Union, and progressively introduced to Western European and global markets from the early 1980s, under the Lada brand, they were sold as saloons (2105 and 2107), and station wagon (2104) versions.

Today they are generally referred to as the Lada Classic series, being derived from the original Fiat 124 platform which has been the now-iconic mainstay of the AvtoVAZ lineup since the company's foundation in the late 1960s. Russian production at the company's main plant at Tolyatti ended in September 2012.

Along with the other Fiat 124 derivatives, it is the world's third best selling, single generation automobile platform, after the Volkswagen Beetle and the Ford Model T, and one of the longest production run platforms alongside the Volkswagen Beetle, the Hindustan Ambassador, the Volkswagen (Type 2) Bus, the Toyota 70 Series, and the Mercedes-Benz G-Class.

== History ==
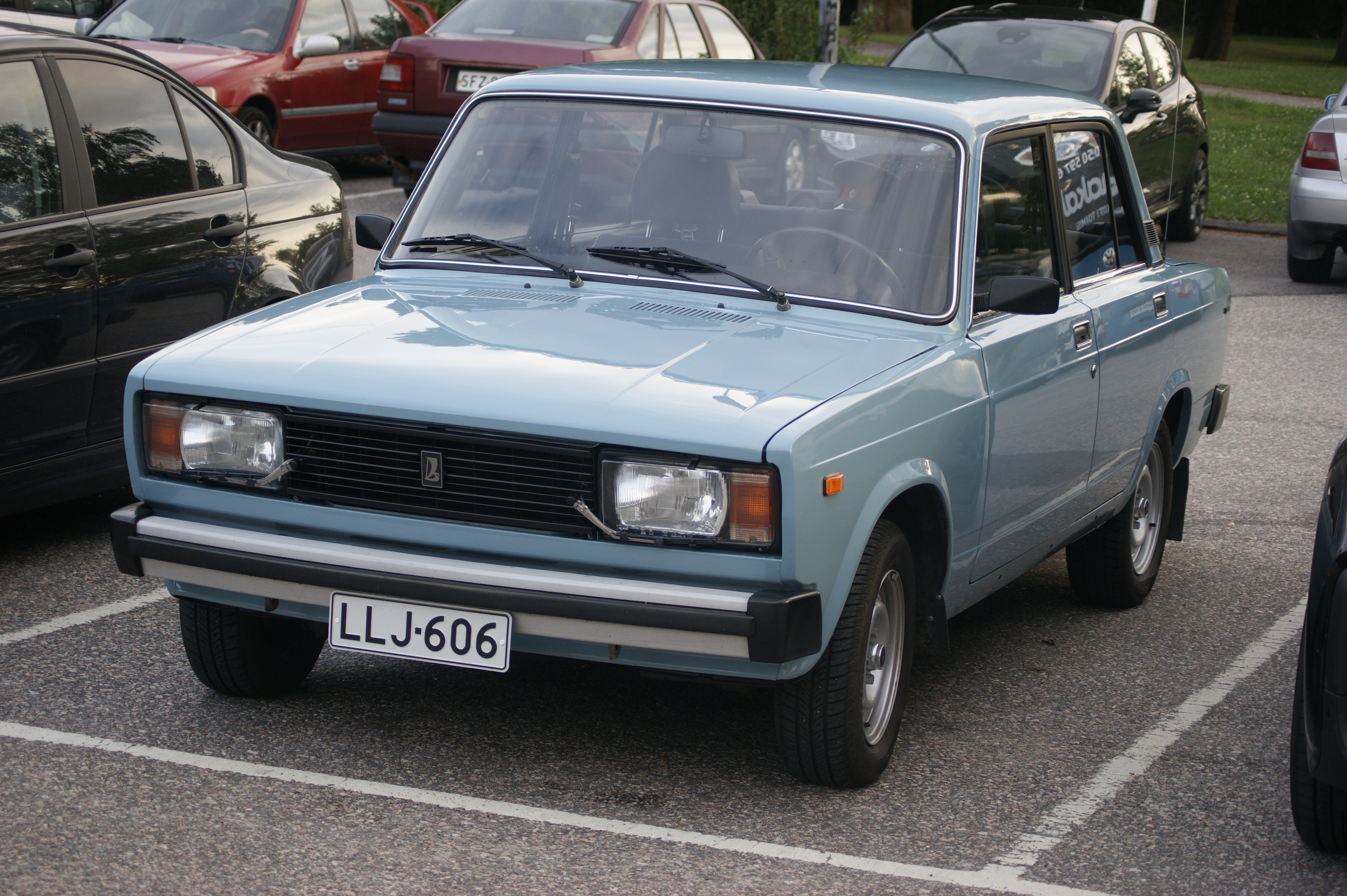
VAZ 2105 (Lada Riva 1300)

Although introduced in 1979 and first produced in quantity in 1980, the Riva's origins are older: it is a modernised and restyled version of the original Lada type VAZ-2101 Zhiguli saloon, which was introduced in 1970 as a modified license copy of the Fiat 124. VAZ began development work on the facelift version as early as 1975, and the first prototypes were built in 1977, although it would not be until 1983 – three years after its release in the Soviet Union – that the car was made available in Western European markets, and like its predecessors - aimed squarely at the budget end of the market.

The Riva itself is officially designated – and known in the home market – as VAZ-2105 (base saloon [sedan]), VAZ-2104 (station wagon), and VAZ-2107 (deluxe saloon identified by the large chromed grille). In Russia, VAZ-2105, VAZ-2104, and VAZ-2107 are considered to be different cars rather than variants but nonetheless all of them are part of a single "Klassika" ("Classic") family along with older models such as the VAZ-2101. They are popularly known as Pyatyorka ("the five"), Chetvyorka ("the four") and Semyorka ("the seven").

Mechanically, the car is virtually identical to the first-generation VAZ-2101, featuring the Fiat-derived manual transmissions, coil spring suspension all round, and aluminium alloy drum brakes with cast iron brake shoes on the rear wheels. The smaller-engined variant, the 66 PS (48 kW; 65 hp) 1,294 cc (79.0 cu in) version (VAZ-2105) had a revamp of its inline four-cylinder compared to the original VAZ-2101 (Lada 1200). The old OHC design had its camshaft driven by chain, while the new one had a toothed belt drive. Some modifications of the Riva's larger-engined version (VAZ-2107) carried on with the 1,452 cc (88.6 cu in) chain-driven OHC engine coming over from the original Lada 1500 (VAZ-2103), while others had a later 1,569 cc (95.7 cu in) 1,6L VAZ-2106/21067 engine. Another change was made to the engine in 1992, when single point fuel injection and catalytic converters were specified to keep up with emissions legislation.

The 2107 was announced in 1982, offered as the luxury version (and the most expensive), with improved interior (including front headrests), a new instrument panel, and a chrome grille; it came with either 1,294 cc (79.0 cu in) (21072) or 1,570 cc (96 cu in) (21074) engines. (The 21079 was a Wankel engined version.)

The first 2104 station wagon appeared in 1984, in three models: the 2104 with 1,294 cc (79.0 cu in); the 21041 with 1,198 cc (73.1 cu in); and the 21043 with 1,452 cc (88.6 cu in) (VAZ-2103) engine.

Western European exports had mostly dried up by 1997, but it remained in production at the AvtoVAZ factory in the Russian Federation and was sold as the Lada Classic. It was one of the cheapest automobiles available in the Russian market and remains the most popular second-hand car in Russia even after its production ceased.

In 2002, production of the wagon model was taken over by Izh, before assembly was also started at the Bogdan Group's LuAZ plant, and later in Cherkasy, Ukraine. The 2107 model was produced also at the ZAZ factory in Ukraine and at Suzuki's factory in Egypt. In August 2011, Russian production of the 2107 was moved to Izh. After about thirty years of production, the 2105 was discontinued in 2010, followed by the 2104 and 2107 in 2012.

== Export markets ==
Export sales proved to be very good in Eastern Europe. In the West, Rivas had limited presence in such countries as the United Kingdom, the Netherlands, New Zealand (where it served as a taxi), and Canada. In Finland, they had much larger sales due to the fact that Finland had closer economic ties with the Soviet Union. Canada was the only market to offer whitewall tires. Canadian 2107s were "briefly sold as the Dennis Signet", after the importer, Peter Dennis Motor Corporation. The Riva family was also exported in significant numbers to Jamaica, where it became very popular as a taxi cab, replacing that country's old fleet of Morris Oxfords. These were paid for in bauxite ore under a barter agreement between Jamaica and the Soviet Union.

Tightening safety and emissions legislation combined with the economic instability in the former Soviet Union during the 1990s led to the Riva being withdrawn from most Western European markets by 1997, although it remained in production until 2012. Canadian sales ended on 4 July 1997.

=== United Kingdom ===
The British market first received the Riva as the 1300GL in July 1983, and the 21051 (Riva 1200L) had the 1,198 cc (73.1 cu in). British sales were based heavily on low sales price and durability. In 1986, more than 20,000 Ladas were sold in Britain, almost all of them Rivas, before peaking at more than 30,000 in 1988, by which time the Samara had been added to the range. British imports of the older VAZ-2101/2102/2106 ended soon after the Riva's introduction, although they remained available in the Soviet Union and much of the old Eastern Bloc for several years afterwards.

In a review of the new economy car, the British automobile magazine Autocar noted its low price of only £3,158 (£10,736.82 in 2020), improved road performance and an "impressive list of standard equipment", which included "height-adjustable headlamps, internally adjustable driver's door mirror, velour-covered seats, heated rear window, illumination lights for bonnet and boot", and a 21-piece toolkit. However, its spartan interiors and ageing design meant that it was never aimed at buyers of market leaders' similar-sized but more expensive products, such as the Ford Sierra, Vauxhall Cavalier and Austin Montego. Nonetheless, the Riva was still selling well in the United Kingdom and many other Western markets in the early 1990s, but the next few years saw a raft of new models come from budget competitors such as Daewoo, Hyundai, Kia and Proton, pushing Riva sales into terminal decline. This, combined with the economic hardships and much-needed investment to adapt cars to stricter European Union emissions requirements not being available, resulted in the decision to withdraw Lada from the UK (and some other European markets) and Canada on 4 July 1997. Riva sales had in fact finished several months earlier. They had cheaply tried to produce catalytic converter equipped cars (EU mandated from 1992) using carburettors, when all other car makers changed to fuel injection to more accurately control fuel/air ratios. However the catalysts were quickly destroyed as a result and most cars failed their first MOT test (at three years old) as a result.

Despite Lada's withdrawal in 1997 from the British market, most of the surviving Rivas on UK roads were not initially scrapped. Over the next few years, the vast majority were re-exported back to Russia due to a shortage of used examples in their homeland and the export specification was considered superior to those that were available domestically. Even in 2021, many ex-UK right hand drive Rivas are still operating in Russia and the former Soviet states.

=== New Zealand ===
The car was also sold in New Zealand, where it was distributed by the New Zealand Dairy Board. The Dairy Board received the cars in lieu of cash payments for deliveries of mutton and butter to the Soviet Union. The last such trade was carried out in 1990.

== Models ==
=== 2105 ===
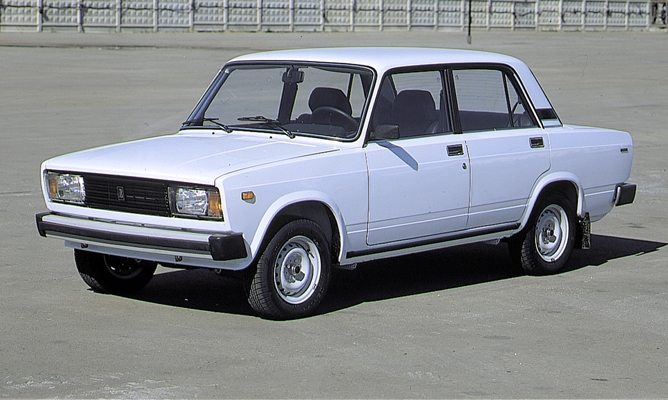
VAZ 2105 (Lada Riva 1300)

- VAZ-2105 (1980–1994) — base model with 1.3L (1,294cc) VAZ-2105 69hp engine (same index as the car; identical to VAZ-21011 engine, but with timing belt instead of timing chain). After the VAZ-2105 engine was discontinued in late 1992, it used the VAZ-21011 engine instead. Discontinued in April 1994 along with other 1.2L and 1.3L VAZ models.
- VAZ-21051 (1980–1994) — variant with 1.2L (1,198cc) VAZ-2101 engine (64hp). Discontinued in April 1994 along with other 1.2L and 1.3L VAZ models.
- VAZ-21053 (1980–2007) — variant with 1.5L (1,452cc) VAZ-2103 engine (75hp). After 1994, it became the sole base model, remaining in production as the cheapest model of the VAZ-2105/2107/2104 family. Discontinued in December 2007 due to switch to Euro-3 emission standards.
  - VAZ-21053-20 (2004–2007) — 1.5L variant with Euro-2 compliant fuel injection (engine index VAZ-2104).
- VAZ-21054 — small-scale variant with 1.6L VAZ-2106 engine, equipped with an additional fuel tank and battery, exclusive to traffic police, MVD and FSB. Certified for production in 1994, discontinued presumably at some point in early 2000s.
  - VAZ-21054-30 (2006-2010) — 1.6L variant with Euro-3 compliant fuel injection (engine index VAZ-21067). For Euro-3, the VAZ-2105 had to switch to larger displacement, as the 1.5L engine had to be detuned too heavily to comply with the new standards. Unrelated to the law enforcement VAZ-21054, beyond sharing the "4" in the index and the engine displacement. Discontinued in December 2010 as the last VAZ-2105 variant in production.
- VAZ-21055 — small-scale variant with 1.5L VAZ-341 diesel engine (50hp), manufactured by BTM in Barnaul. Built through 2003-2004, when VAZ-2104 became temporarily unavailable due to the transfer of its production line to Izhevsk.
- VAZ-21056 — right-hand drive variant of the base 1.3L VAZ-2105. Sold in the UK as "Lada Riva 1300 GL" from May 1983 to May 1986, and then as "Lada Riva 1300 L" from October 1989 to April 1992.
- VAZ-21057 — right-hand drive variant of the 1.5L VAZ-21053. Sold in the UK as "Lada Riva 1500" from April 1992 to autumn 1996.
- VAZ-21058 — right-hand drive variant of the 1.2L VAZ-21051. Sold in the UK as "Lada Riva 1200 L" from May 1984 to October 1989.
- VAZ-21059 — variant with 1.3L VAZ-411 Wankel engine (120hp) with four-speed manual transmission, capable of achieving of 180 km/h (112 mph) and 0–97 km/h (0–60 mph) in nine seconds. Entered small scale production in June 1986, presumably continuing until early 1990s. It was available exclusively for traffic police, KGB and MVD, it was never sold to private citizens and its existence was kept in secrecy, omitted from publicly available documentation.

=== 2107 ===
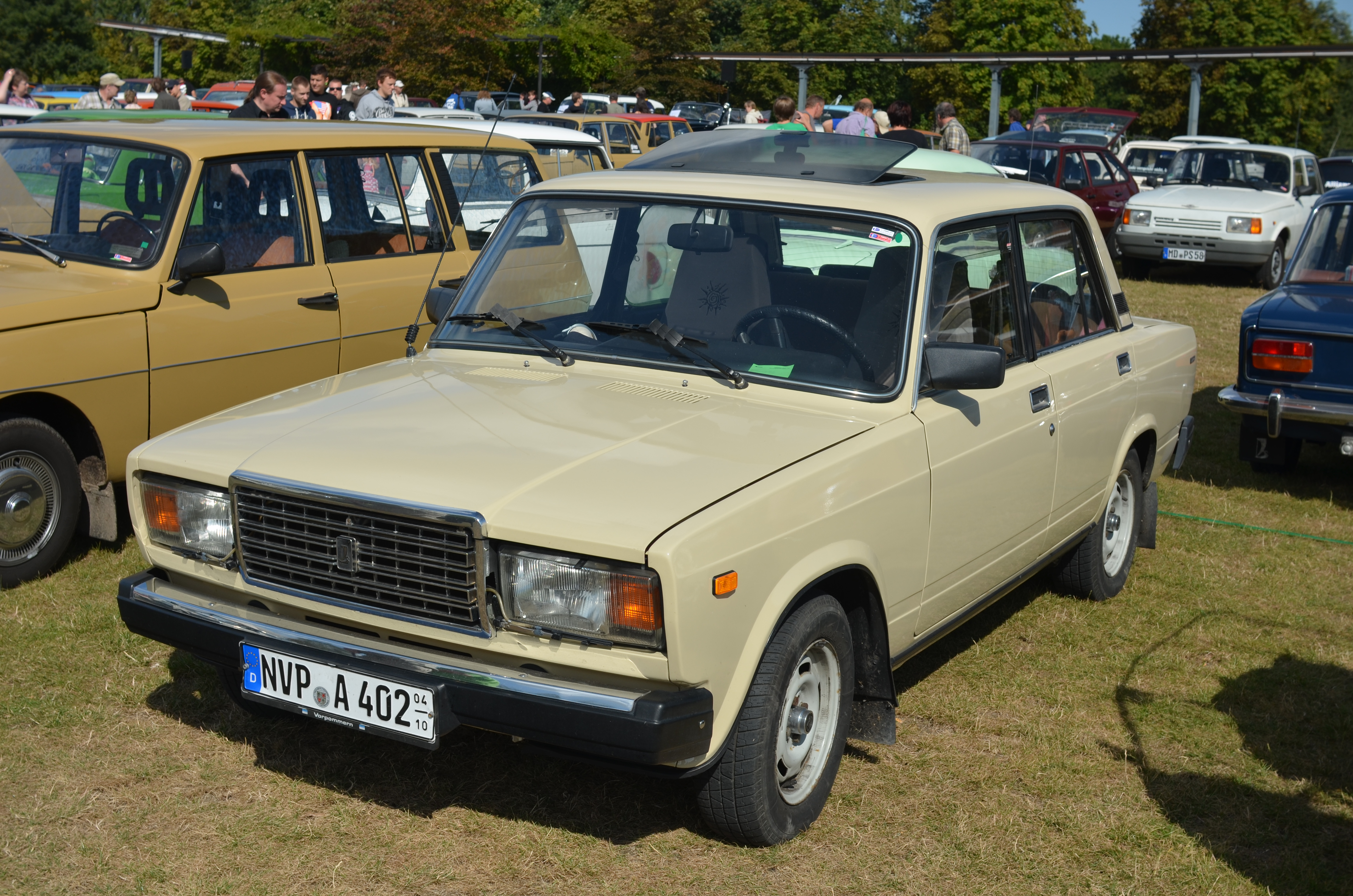
Lada 2107

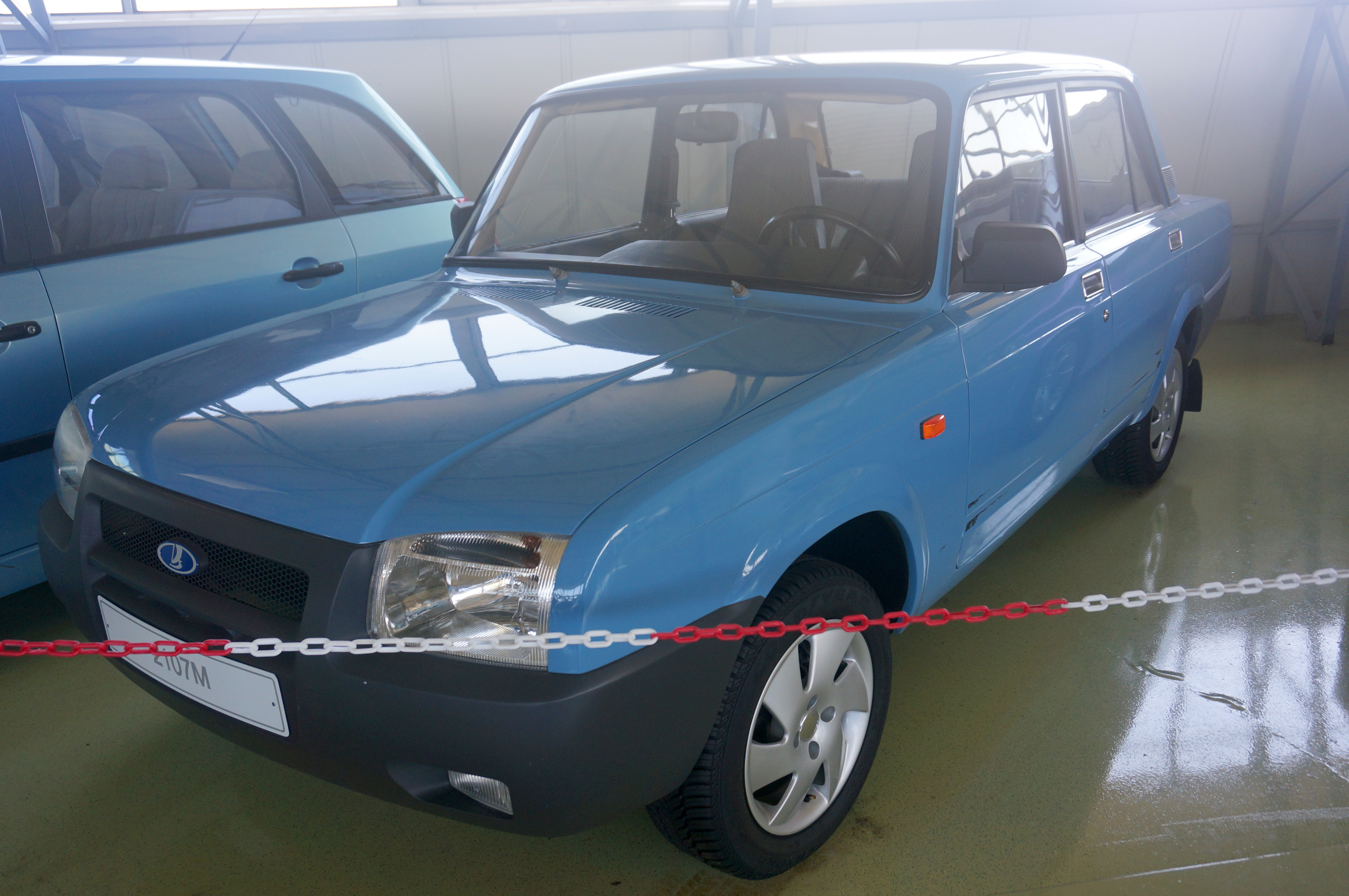
Classic-2 (2107M) prototype from 2007

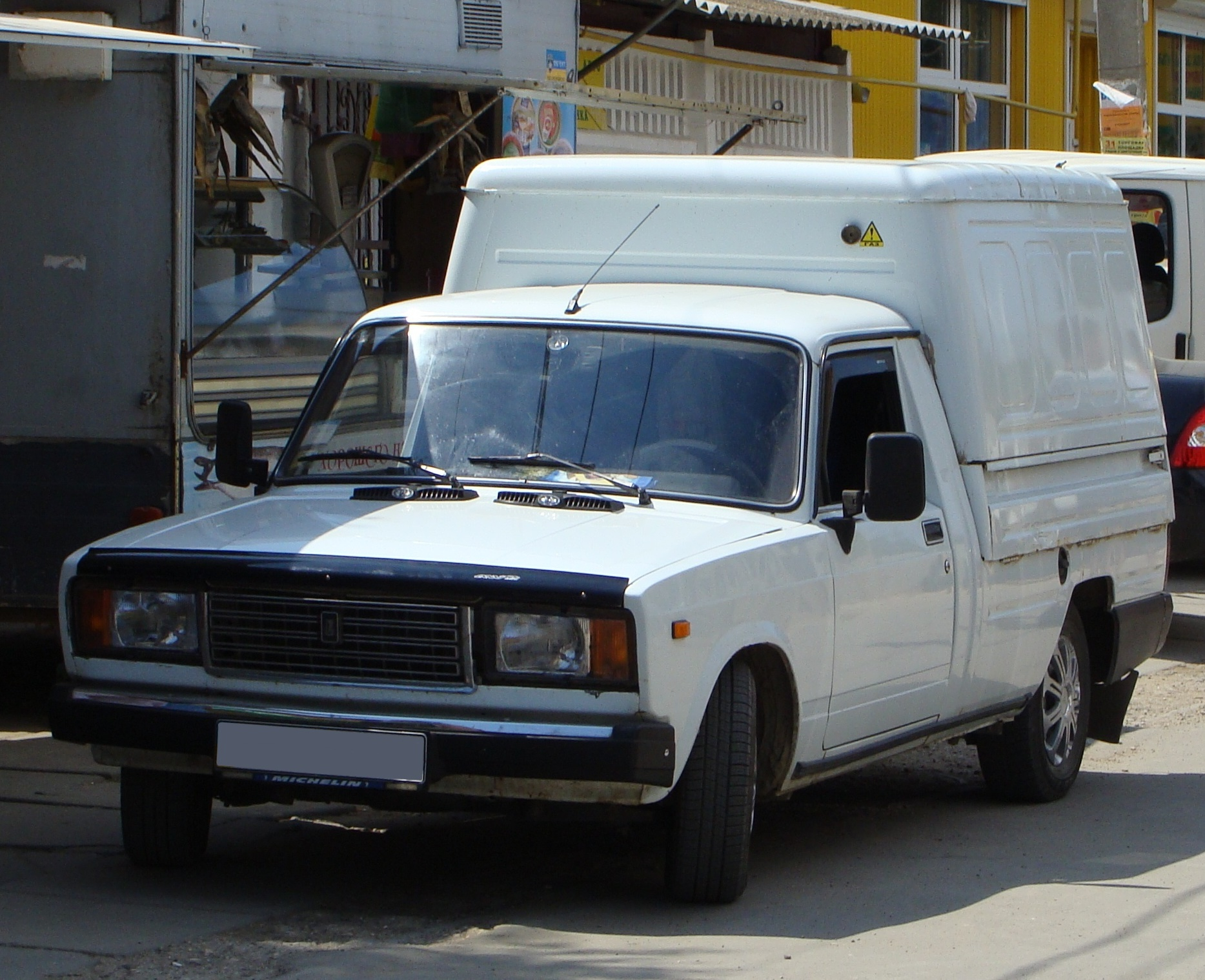
Izh 27175, pick-up model derived from the VAZ (Lada) 2104

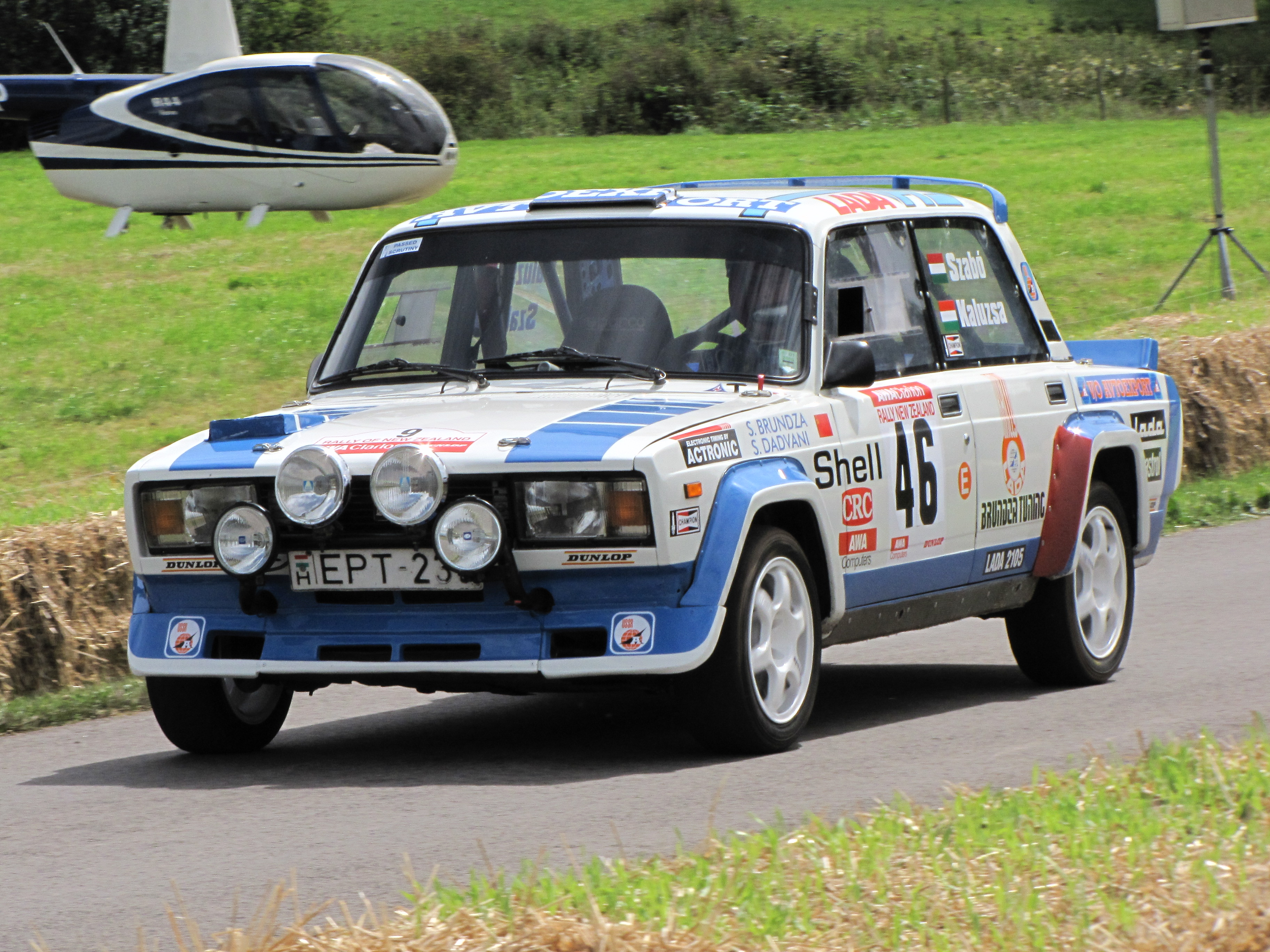
Rally car

- VAZ-2107 (1982–2009) — base model with 1.5L (1,452cc) VAZ-2103 engine (75hp). From the 2000s onwards, it has also been officially referred to as "VAZ-21070", to distinguish it from its namesake family.
  - VAZ-21070-20 (2004–2009) — 1.5L variant with Euro-2 compliant fuel injection (engine index VAZ-2104). Discontinued in Russia in 2006, in Ukraine in 2009.
- VAZ-21072 (1982–1994) — variant with 1.3L (1,294cc) VAZ-2105 engine (69hp). Less common than the other VAZ-2107 variants, it wascontinued in April 1994 along with other 1.2L and 1.3L VAZ models.
- VAZ-21074 (1982–2012) — variant with 1.6L (1,568cc) VAZ-2106 engine (80hp). Originally it was an export-only model, domestic sales started only after the dissolution of the USSR.
  - VAZ-21074-20 (2004–2007) — 1.6L variant with Euro-2 compliant fuel injection (engine index VAZ-21067). Discontinued in Russia in 2007 after the switch to Euro-3, never sold in Ukraine.
  - VAZ-21074-30 (2006–2012) — 1.6L variant with Euro-3 compliant fuel injection (engine index VAZ-21067). Discontinued in April 2012 as the last VAZ-2107 model sold in the former Soviet states.
- VAZ-21073 (1994–2003) — variant with 1.7L (1690cc) VAZ-21213 engine (85hp) and Euro-1 compliant fuel injection. The first injection variant of the VAZ-2105/2107/2104 family, it was sold exclusively in the Western/Central European markets and never available in any of the former Soviet states.
- VAZ-21076 — right-hand drive variant of the base 1.5L VAZ-2107. Sold in the UK as "Lada Riva 1500 GLX" from April 1984 to May 1986.
- VAZ-21077 — right-hand drive variant of the 1.3L VAZ-21072. Sold in the UK as "Lada Riva 1300 SL" from May 1986 to April 1990.
- VAZ-21078 — right-hand drive variant of the 1.6L VAZ-21051. Sold in the UK as "Lada Riva 1600 SLX" from May 1986 to April 1992.
- VAZ-21079 — variant with 1.3L VAZ-4132 Wankel engine (140hp). Entered small scale production in late 1991, presumably continuing through the 1990s. As with its predecessors, it was available exclusively for the law enforcement.
- VAZ-2107-71 — variant for the Chinese market with 1.4L VAZ-21033 engine for low-grade A-76 gasoline (normally the entire VAZ-2101-2107 family used AI-93 gasoline). Very little is documented about it, nothing is known regarding its production history.

=== 2104 ===
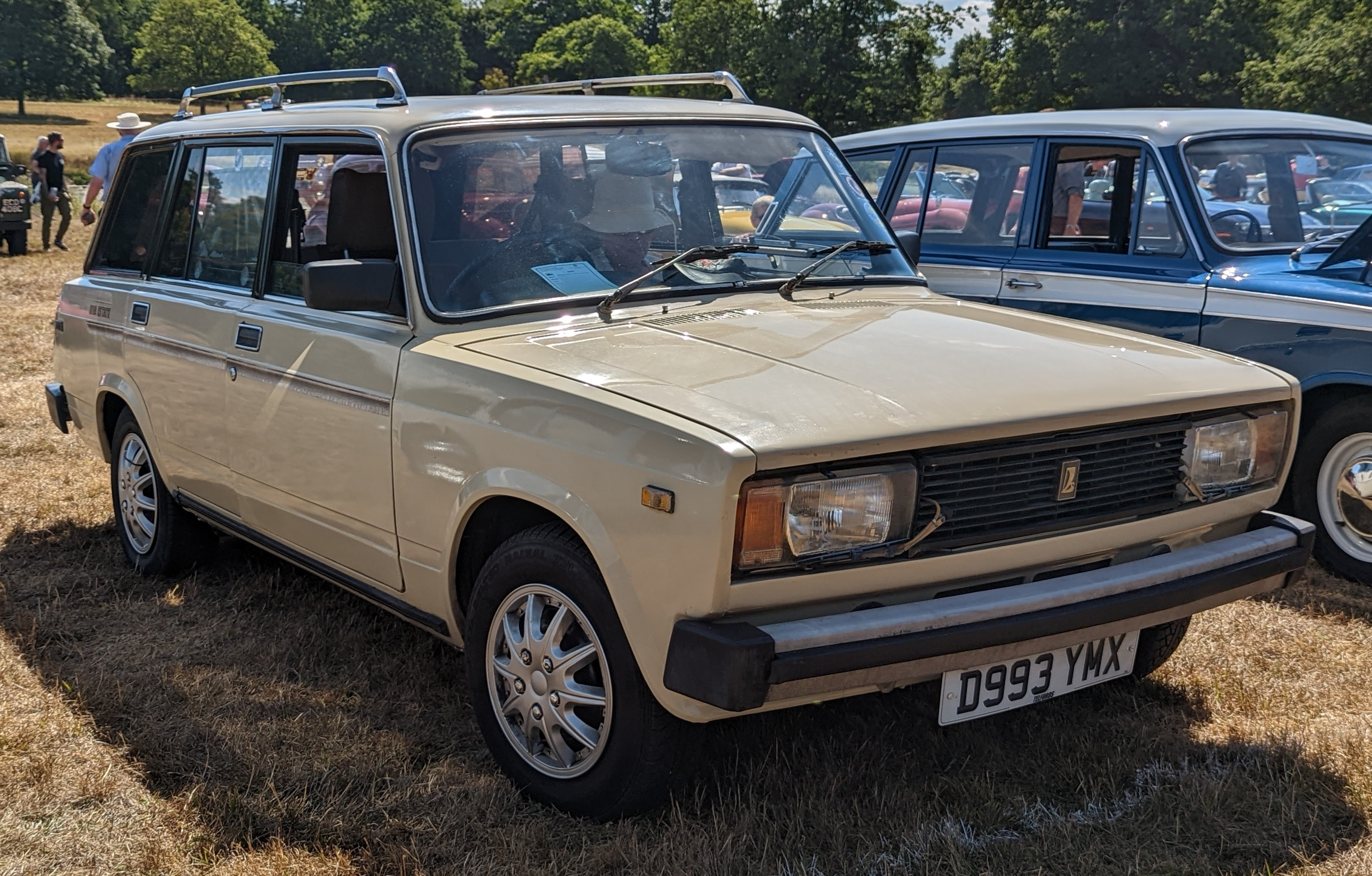
VAZ-21043

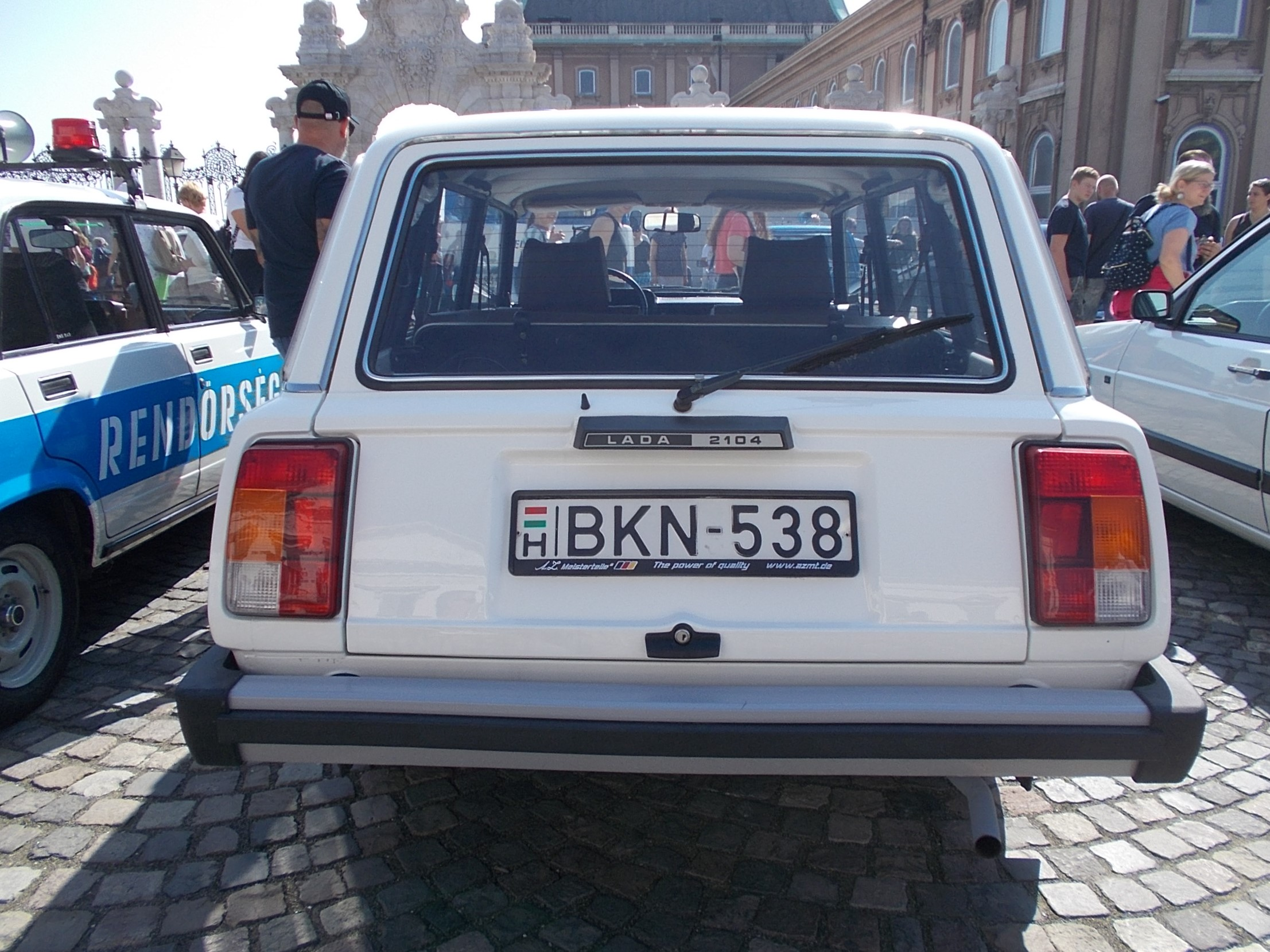
VAZ-21043 (rear view)

- VAZ-2104 (1984–1994) — base model with 1.3L (1,294cc) VAZ-2105 engine (69hp). Discontinued in April 1994 along with other 1.2L and 1.3L VAZ models.
- VAZ-21043 (1984–2009) — variant with 1.5L (1,452cc) VAZ-2103 engine (75hp). Originally it was an export-only model, domestic sales started only after the dissolution of the USSR; with the demise of the base 2104, it became the new base model of the VAZ-2104 family. In August 2003, its production line was transferred to IzhAvto, where the VAZ-2106 was already in production. Through the 2000s, the VAZ-21043 had its seats, dashboard, other interior components, and later the front clip replaced with that of the VAZ-2107; this variant was sometimes referred to in advertising and other press materials as "VAZ-21047" to differentiate it from the regular VAZ-2104, even though this index actually belonged to a right-hand-drive variant and the cars were still registered as "VAZ-21043".
  - VAZ-21043-20 (2004–2009) — 1.5L variant with Euro-2 compliant fuel injection (engine index VAZ-2104). Discontinued in Russia in 2006, in Ukraine in 2009.
- VAZ-21041 (2006–2012) — variant with 1.6L (1,568cc) VAZ-21067 engine (80hp) with fuel injection, introduced to unify the engines between the VAZ-2104 and the already 1.6L-powered Izh-27175. Strictly saying, a base "21401" was never built, since it already started out with injection suffixes. As with the VAZ-21043, it incorporated various VAZ-2107 components through its production, and was occasionally marketed as "VAZ-21047". Never sold in Ukraine.
  - VAZ-21041-20 (2006–2007) — 1.6L variant with Euro-2 compliant fuel injection (engine index VAZ-21067). Discontinued in Russia in 2007 after the switch to Euro-3.
  - VAZ-21041-30 (2007–2012) — 1.6L variant with Euro-3 compliant fuel injection (engine index VAZ-21067). Discontinued in September 2012 as the last VAZ-2104 model sold in the former Soviet states.
- VAZ-21044 (1994–2003) — variant with 1.7L (1690cc) VAZ-21213 engine (85hp) and Euro-1 compliant fuel injection. As with the VAZ-21073, it was sold exclusively in the Western/Central European markets and never available in any of the former Soviet states.
- VAZ-21045 (2002–2003) — small-scale variant with 1.5L VAZ-341 diesel engine (50hp), manufactured by BTM in Barnaul.
- VAZ-21048 (2002) — prototype with 1.7L VAZ-343 diesel engine (64hp), never entered production.
- VAZ-21046 — right-hand drive variant of the base 1.3L VAZ-2104. Sold in the UK as "Lada Riva 1300 Estate" from October 1985 to April 1992.
- VAZ-21047 — right-hand drive variant of the 1.5L VAZ-21043. Sold in the UK as "Lada Riva 1500 Estate" from October 1985 to autumn 1996.

Commercial derivatives

- VAZ-21043-33 (1993-1997) — the first production vehicle of VIS, a crude pickup variant of the VAZ-21043 made by cutting off the side panels and the roof of the car past the B-pillar. Built in small numbers, replaced by proper commercial variants soon thereafter.
- VIS-2345 (1997–2012) — commercial truck-like derivative of the VAZ-21043, with the rear half of its body replaced by an exposed frame to mount a flatbed, a container or any other appliance; this layout was shared by the majority of the following VIS models based on different VAZ car components. Switched to Euro-2 injection in 2004, Euro-3 (1.6L) and VAZ-2107 front clip in 2006, discontinued in 2012.
- Izh-27175 (2005–2012) — high-roof panel van variant of the VAZ-21043, incorporating the cargo compartment of the Izh-2126-derived Izh-2717, the final model of the "pirozhok" lineage started by the Izh-2715. Unlike the VIS-2345, it used the 1.6L VAZ-2106 (and later VAZ-21067) engine since its debut. The upper canopy was removable, so the car could function as a panel van and a pickup truck simultaneously. Switched to Euro-2 injection in 2006, Euro-3 and VAZ-2107 front clip in 2007, discontinued in 2012.

== Other variants ==
Model variants included the Riva Signet, Riva 1200, Riva 1300, Riva 1500, and Riva 1600, with trim levels "E" and "L". A Turbo charged model Lada 2107 Turbo was sold in Finland, made by the Finnish Lada importer.

Small numbers of Lada rally cars were built with 150 PS (110 kW) Wankel engines, fitted with a pair of Weber DCOE twin-choke carburettors.

=== Production at Suzuki Egypt ===
In Egypt, the Amal Foreign Trade Company and Lada's parent company AvtoVAZ signed a joint venture agreement to assemble Ladas for the North African market in 2000. However, as they did not have their own factory, space was found at a local Suzuki plant in Cairo to assemble the 2107 version of the Riva. As of 2006, production continued at Suzuki until 2015 with an additional model, the 2110, being produced.

== Safety ==
In the early 1980s, when it was put into production, the car complied with UNECE car safety standards and GOST technical standards.

In 2001, the 2107 version of the Riva scored 0 points out of 16 in a frontal crash test conducted by the modern Russian ARCAP safety assessment program, and was awarded zero stars out of four. The reviewers noted that the result of the test was easily predictable and couldn't be positive, as they were dealing with an old car having an outdated construction of the body and designed at a time when safety tests were different from those of 2001.

In 2002 Za Rulyom magazine performed crash tests on two Lada 21053 models, a new car from 2002 and a used one from 1994. The magazine's experts noted that the newer model complied with UNECE car safety standards 12-03 and 33, but the older and used one failed the latter standard. The story also expressed doubt that the 2002 model could meet the stricter safety requirements that would be imposed in October of the same year.

== End of production ==
In the 2010s, the sales of the Lada Classics remained strong in the car's native Russia and some of the former Eastern Bloc nations. However, production of the 2105 ceased at AvtoVAZ's Togliatti plant at the end of 2010 after a 30-year production run and nearly 3,000,000 units, with production of the other variants being fully moved to the IzhAvto plant near Izhevsk.

The 2107 made the transition to the IzhAvto plant in August 2011, thus marking the end of production of the original Fiat 124 derived models at Togliatti after a 41-year production run and over 14 million units.

In September 2012, the history of the saloon model in Russia was over, when the last 2104 came off the IzhAvto assembly lines. The last unit of the Lada Classic series, a 2104 model, was produced by IzhAvto on 17 September 2012. Starting from the same month, production at the Izhevsk factory was replaced with the Lada Granta. However, as of 2014, the 2107 model was still in production in Egypt.
