= Vehicle Certification Agency =

Executive agency in the United Kingdom

- Type: Government agency
- Region served: United Kingdom
- Parent organisation: Department for Transport
- Website: vehicle-certification-agency.gov.uk

The Vehicle Certification Agency (VCA) is an executive agency of the United Kingdom Department for Transport, and is the UK's type approval authority.

== History ==
VCA has been supporting the automotive industry since the early 1970s, with offices in the UK, North America, Brazil, Japan (Asia Pacific), Korea, China, Italy, India and Australia.

== Services ==
The services that VCA provide include type approval testing and certification for all road-going vehicles, including cars, trucks, motorcycles, agricultural vehicles, buses and coaches, ambulances, fire engines and motor caravans, and replacement part systems and components.

VCA are also responsible for the production of the new car fuel consumption and emission figures. This information is made available through an online database containing the latest fuel consumption and emissions data for new cars. The site also includes tools to help users to calculate vehicle tax.
