= Sir Vival =

Concept car

The Sir Vival was a concept car created by Walter C. Jerome of Worcester, Massachusetts in 1958. Jerome created what he termed a "revolutionary vehicle" due to concern about what he saw as 1950s Detroit's lack of concern for safety and focus on planned obsolescence. While never produced commercially, the Sir Vival featured many innovative car safety concepts that would later become standard such as seat belts, a roll cage, sliding side doors, rubber bumpers, and side lights. The car's most distinctive features were a two-part construction that separates the engine and front wheels from the main passenger cab via an articulated universal joint and the driver's turret, an elevated seat where the driver commands near-360 degree visibility thanks to a cylindrical glass enclosure. Along with the 1957 Aurora it is one of the earliest experimental safety vehicles ever made.

== History ==
Creating the Sir Vival prototype was a 10-year mission of Walter Jerome, a graduate of Northeastern University's College of Engineering. He created it from a 1948 Hudson, purchased from a Hudson dealer in Bellingham, Massachusetts. He drew up blueprints and enlisted students of his at the Worcester Boys' Trade School. The actual Sir Vival bears little resemblance to the original Hudson.

== Features ==
According to the marketing pamphlet written by Jerome entitled "Sir Vival. An Adventure in Safe Motoring" the prominent features of the car were:

- Two-piece engine and cab. Perhaps the most noticeable design element of the Sir Vival is the two-part segmented chassis. The engine and front wheels sit in a separate section which in turn is connected to the passenger cab by an articulated joint. The rationale was that in a front or side collision the sections would articulate around the vertical axis and absorb the critical shock of the collision.
- Driver turret. The driver of the Sir Vival sat in a single elevated seat about 3 feet above the level of the rear passenger seat. To increase visibility, the Sir Vival "windshield" was a cylinder of glass about one foot high and four feet in circumference.

== Marketing and reception ==
It was Jerome's belief that the safety of the American motoring public had for too long been ignored by the Detroit manufacturers and that he could lure the safety conscious auto-buyer by stressing safety and the "breathtaking design" of his car. He intended to produce 10-12 cars a year at a retail price of $10,000. This was not an inconsequential price tag given that a Series 62 Cadillac started at around $5,000 at that time.

To market the Sir Vival Jerome created the Hollow Boring Corporation of Worcester and spent many years looking for purchasers and financing. In the process he displayed the vehicle at automotive and popular events such as the International Auto Show, the 1964 New York World's Fair, the Springfield Exposition, and the 1959 Foreign and Sports Car Show in Boston. The Sir Vival received publicity in Life magazine and automotive focused publications such as Mechanix Illustrated and Motor Trend magazines. It was covered in many foreign publications as well. The publications were generally neutral on the viability of the car but stressed the safety features and the technological advancements.

Despite the press and the showings at high-profile venues, Jerome never garnered the funding needed to manufacture another Sir Vival, and so the prototype remains the only version ever produced.

== Fate ==
Sir Vival hasn't been operational since showing at the 1964 World's Fair. After Jerome's death in the early 1970s, the Moore family, owner of Bellingham Auto Sales which provided the original Hudson, took possession and stored it there. With that business shutting down, current owner Ed Moore sold the car in 2022 to Lane Motor Museum which plans to restore it.

== See also ==
- L'Œuf électrique
