= Fiat 124 =

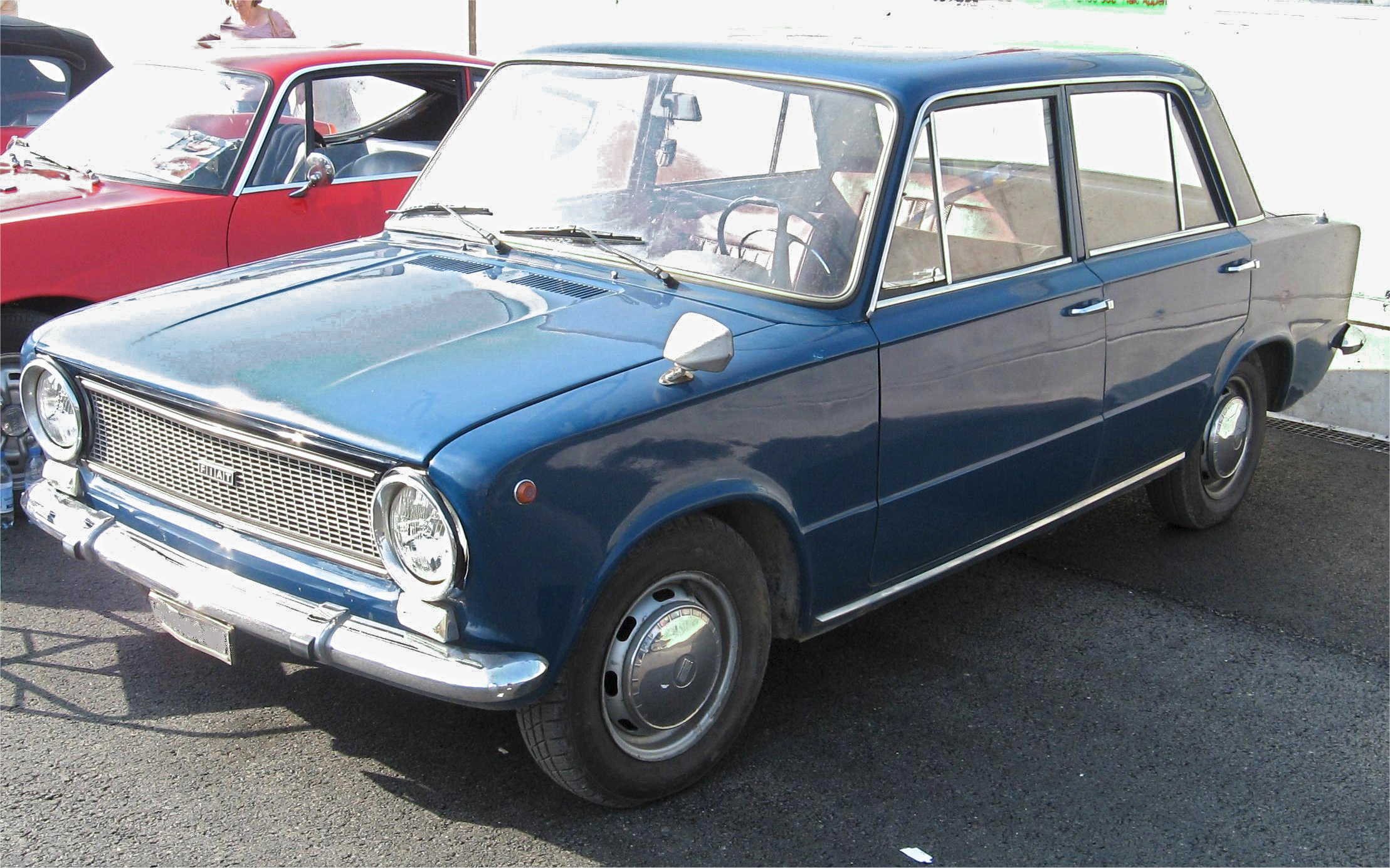

Overview
- Manufacturer: Fiat
- Also called: SEAT 124; Tofaş Murat 124
- Production: 1966–1974
- Assembly: Italy: Comprensorio di Mirafiori, Turin; Bulgaria: Lovech (Pirin-Fiat); Malaysia: Johor Bahru (KPKK); Morocco: Casablanca (Somaca); South Korea: Hwaseong (Kia Motors)

Body and chassis
- Class: Small family car
- Body style: 4-door saloon; 5-door estate; 2-door coupé (124 Sport Coupé); 2-door spider (124 Sport Spider)
- Layout: FR layout
- Related: Fiat 125; SEAT 124; VAZ-2101 (Lada 1200); VAZ-2103 (Lada 1500); VAZ-2105 / VAZ-2107 (Lada Riva); Murat 124/Tofaş Serçe; Premier 118NE

Powertrain
- Engine: 1,197 cc OHV I4; 1,438 cc OHV I4; 1,438 cc DOHC I4; 1,592 cc DOHC I4; 1,756 cc DOHC I4
- Transmission: 4-speed manual 5-speed manual (Special T)

Dimensions
- Wheelbase: 2,420 mm (95.3 in)
- Length: 4,030–4,053 mm (158.7–159.6 in) (saloon); 4,045 mm (159.3 in) (station wagon)
- Width: 1,625 mm (64.0 in)
- Height: 1,420 mm (55.9 in) (saloon); 1,440 mm (56.7 in) (station wagon)
- Kerb weight: 855–950 kg (1,885–2,094 lb)

Chronology
- Predecessor: Fiat 1300 and 1500
- Successor: Fiat 131

The Fiat 124 is a small family car manufactured and marketed by Italian company Fiat between 1966 and 1974. The saloon superseded the Fiat 1300 and spawned station wagon, four-seater coupé (124 Sport Coupé), and two-seater convertible (124 Sport Spider) variants.

Fiat licensed numerous variants of the 124 for worldwide manufacture, including the Russian-built VAZ-2101 "Zhiguli" and its many derivatives. Known as the Lada outside the Soviet Union, these Russian variants constituted the vast majority of 124 derived production, making it the fifth best selling automotive platform in history.

The 124 was superseded in its home market by the Fiat 131, launched in 1974.

== History ==
As a clean-sheet design by Oscar Montabone, the chief engineer responsible for its development, the 124 used only the all-synchromesh gear box from the Fiat 1500. The 124 featured a spacious interior, advanced coil spring rear suspension, disc brakes on all wheels and lightweight construction.

A 5-door station wagon variant (named 124 Familiare on its home market) as well as the 124 Sport Spider variants debuted at the 48th Turin Motor show in November 1966. A few months later, at the March 1967 Geneva Motor Show, the 124 Sport Coupé completed the range. The two Sport models were powered by an all-new 1.4-litre dual overhead camshaft engine producing 90 DIN-rated PS (66 kW; 89 hp) at 6,500 rpm.

Following its introduction in 1966 with a publicity stunt, where a 124 was dropped by parachute from a plane, the 124 won the 1967 European Car of the Year award.

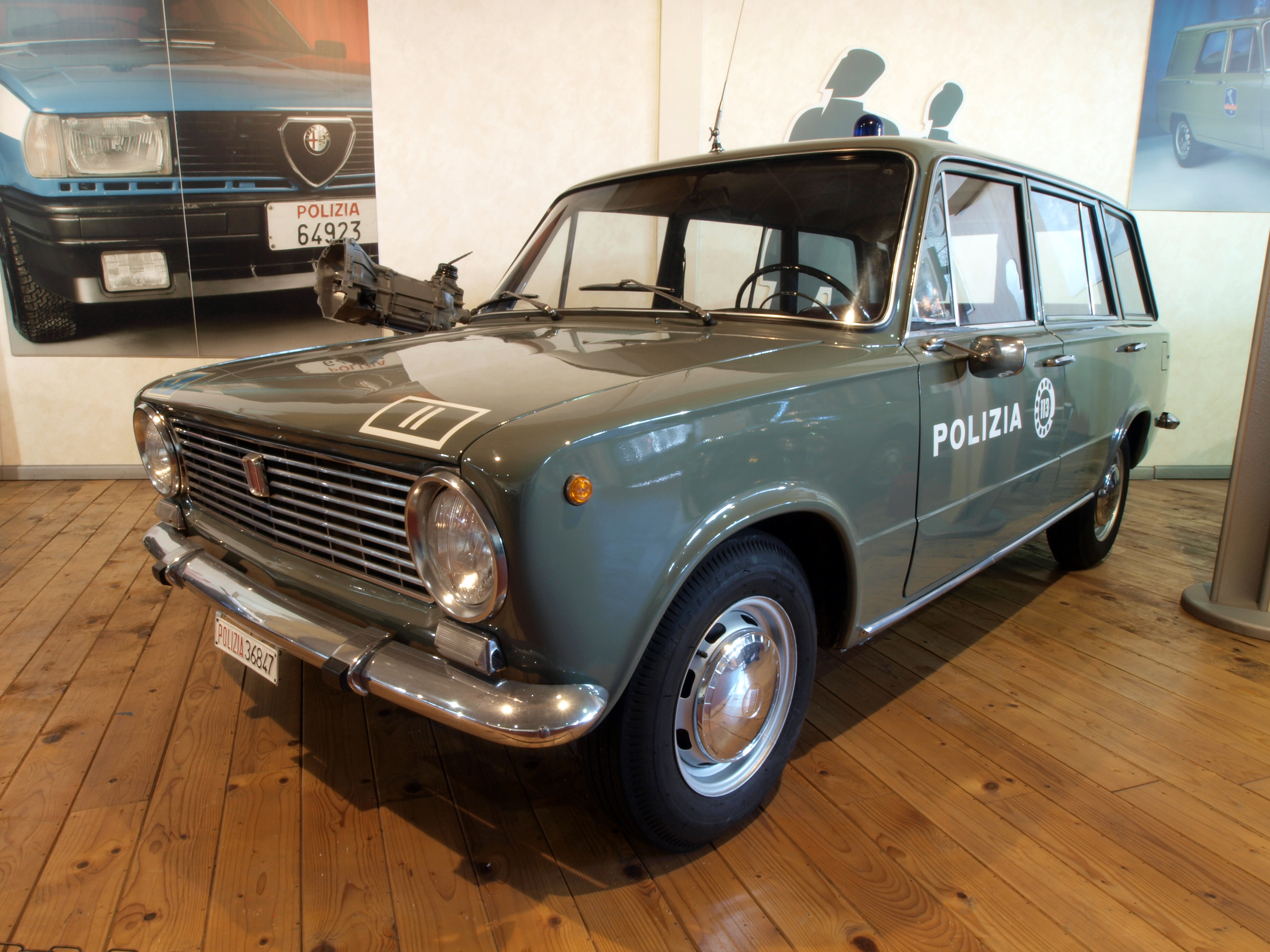
Fiat 124 Familiare

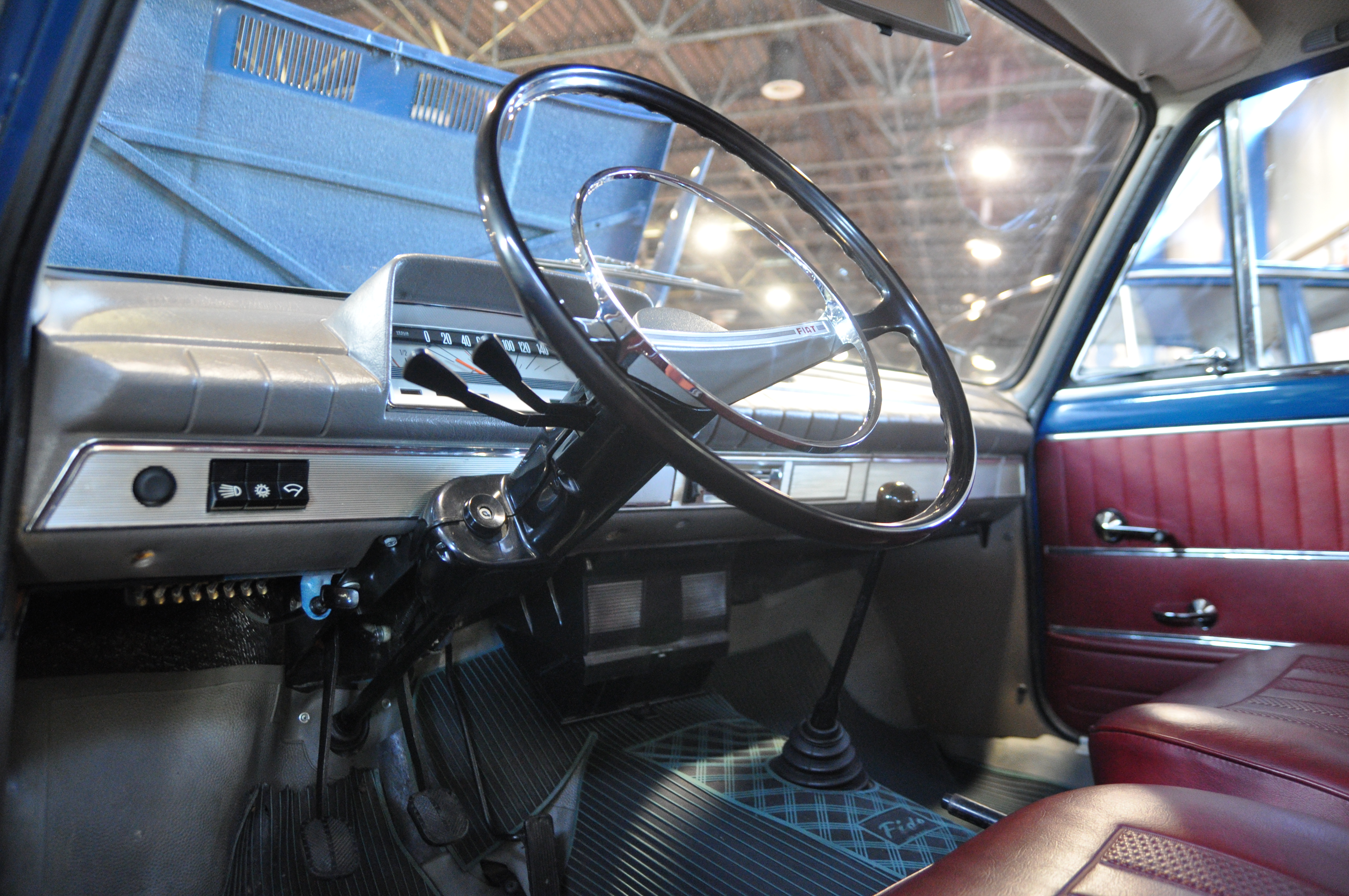
Fiat 124 sedan interior

=== The 124 Special ===
In October 1968, Fiat launched the 124 Special. Like Fiat's first Special version, the 850 Special that was introduced in spring that year, it was an upmarket, better appointed and higher performance variant of the standard saloon. A month after, in November, it was displayed at the 50th Turin Motor Show alongside its larger sibling, the also new 125 Special. In addition to a 1.4-litre overhead valve engine, the 124 Special notably introduced all-new 5-link (four longitudinal, one transverse) solid axle rear suspension in place of the original 3-link design. Starting from late 1968 the same improved rear axle was adopted by both Sport models.

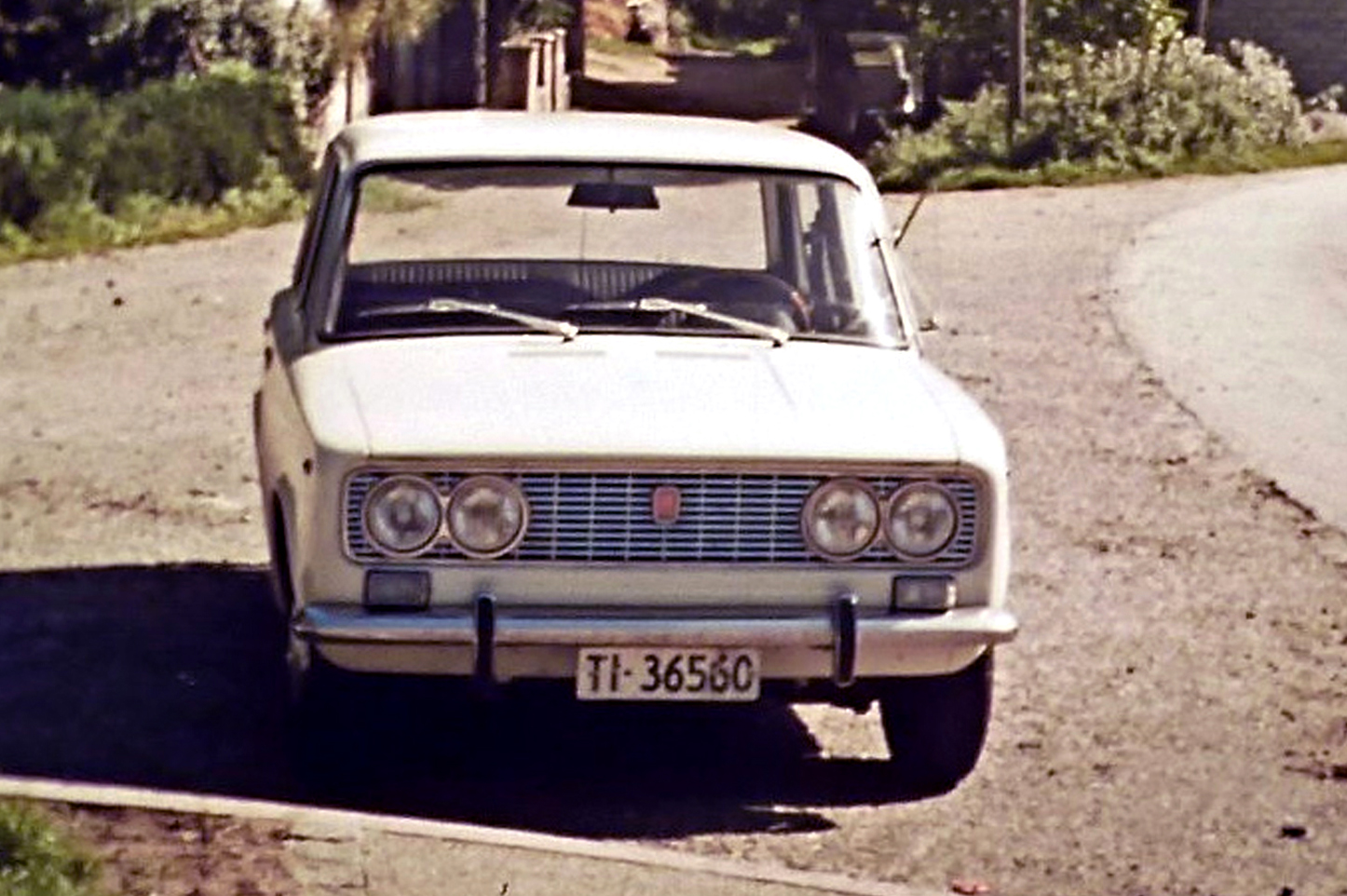
Fiat 124 S

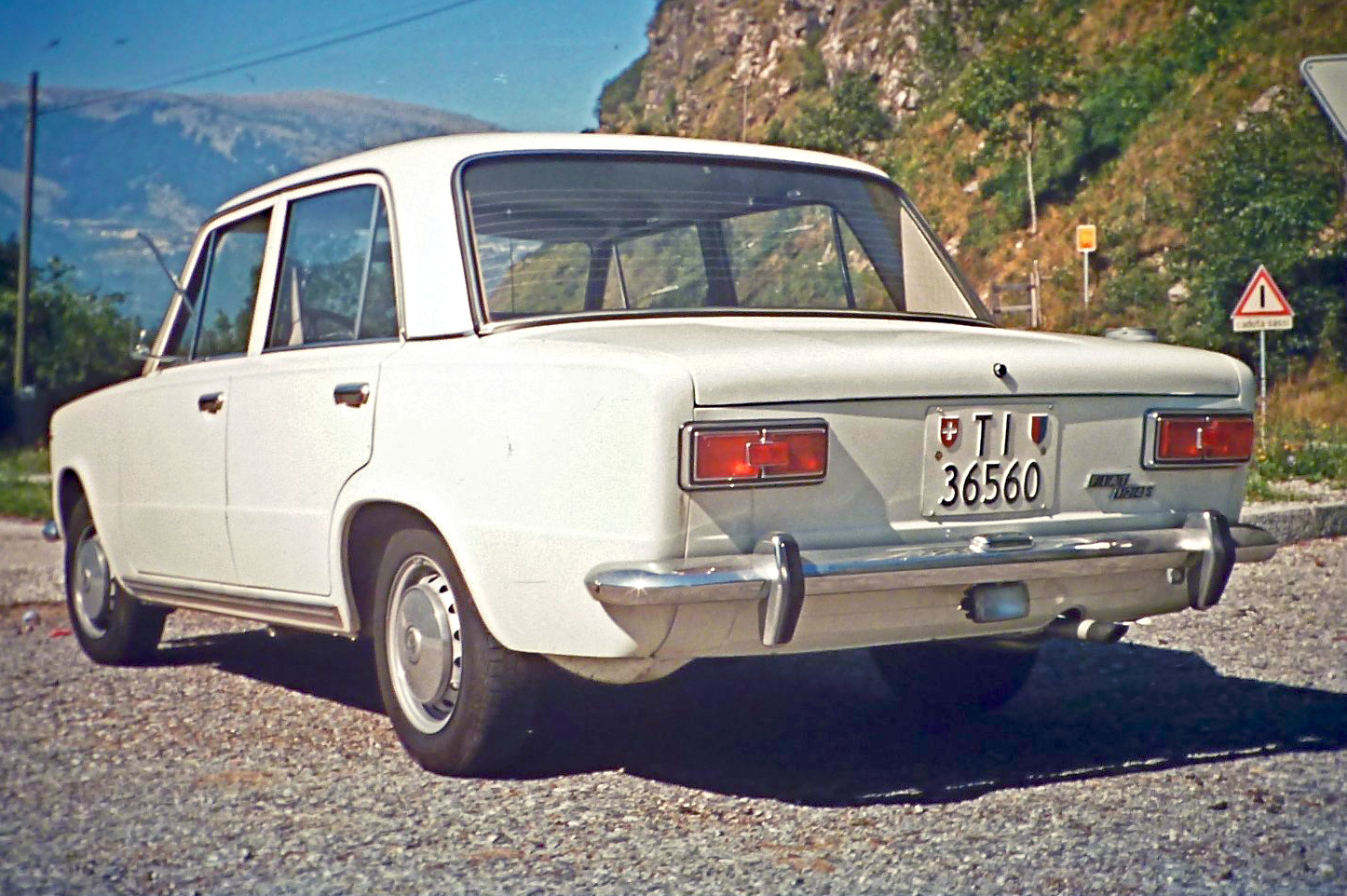
Rear view

In detail the Special's 1,438 cc type 124 A2 engine had the same bore and stroke of the Sport Coupé and Sport Spider engines (80 × 71.5 mm), but eschewed the dual overhead camshafts of the two sportscars in favour of the more conventional overhead valve setup from the 124 saloon. With a downdraught (instead of the 1.2's sidedraught) twin-choke Weber 32 DHS or Solex C32 EIES carburettor and a 9.0:1 compression ratio, engine output was 70 DIN-rated metric horsepower (51 kW; 69 hp) at 5,400 rpm and 110 DIN-rated newton-metres (81 lb⋅ft) of torque at 3,300 rpm. Fiat advertised a top speed of over 150 km/h (93 mph). Besides engine and rear axle, notable mechanical changes from the regular 124 were an alternator replacing the dynamo, an uprated clutch, standard radial tyres, and the addition of a vacuum servo to the all-disc braking system.

Visually the Special could be immediately distinguished from the standard model by its new, rectangular grille with four inset round headlamps. Less evident differences were larger vertical bumper over-riders, wheels with round ventilation holes as on the Sport models, new flush door handles, different tail lamps with integrated reflectors, and a central back-up light. The interior featured a redesigned padded dashboard with an oval binnacle housing two round instruments and a car radio console, a steering wheel without horn ring, new door cards, and more supportive seats.

=== 1970 revisions and the 124 Special T ===
At the November 1970 Turin Motor Show, Fiat introduced a round of updates for the entire saloon and estate 124 range, as well as a new model variant—the 124 Special T.

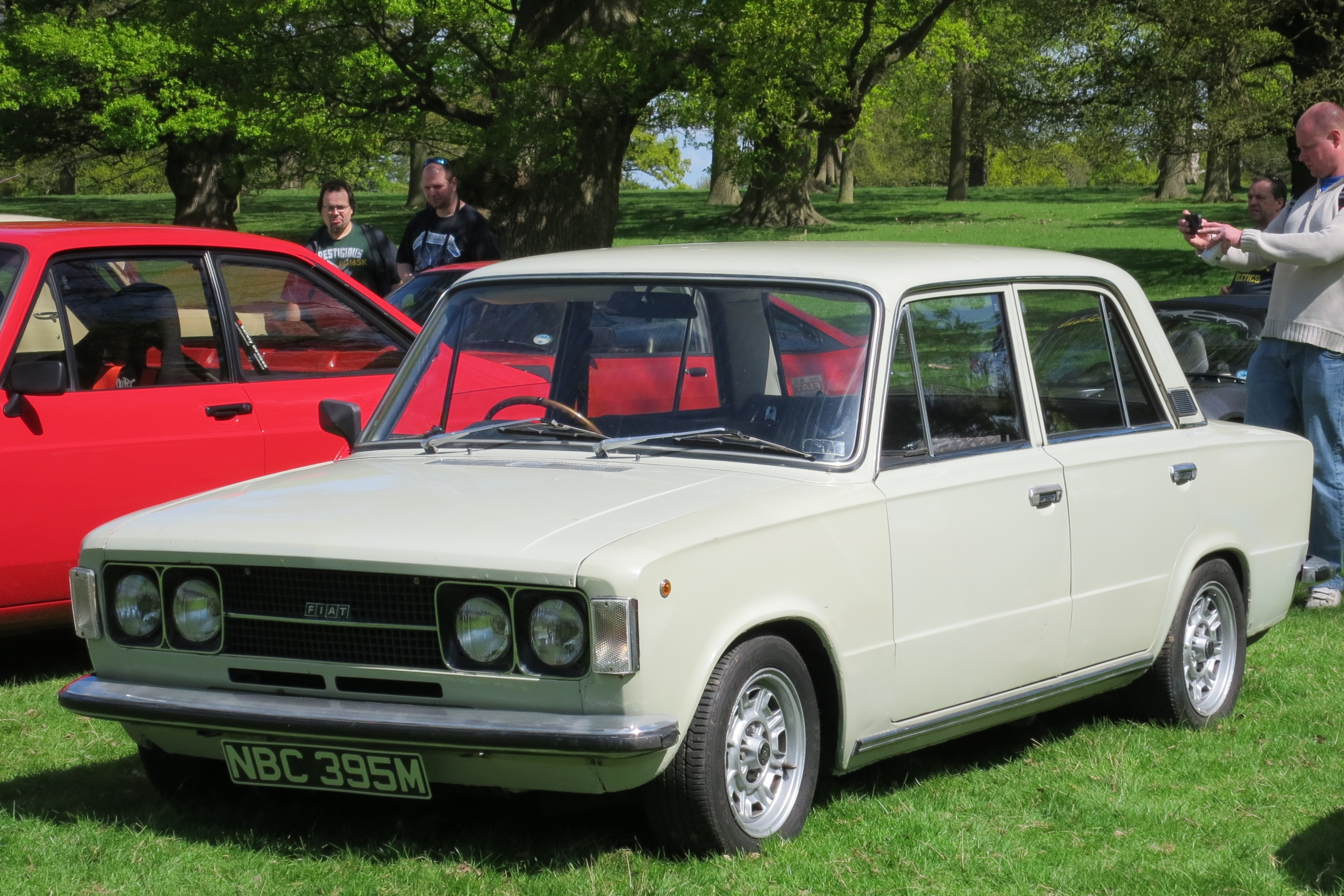
Fiat 124 Special T 1600

All models had gained air outlets added to the C-pillar for better ventilation, and a split brake circuit; while some features previously exclusive to the 124 Special such as servo-assisted brakes, back-up light and an alternator were made standard across the range. Berlina and Familiare both had a new grille with alternated chrome and black horizontal bars, and larger bumper over-riders. Additionally the Berlina had large, nearly square tail lamps made up by two stacked rectangular elements.

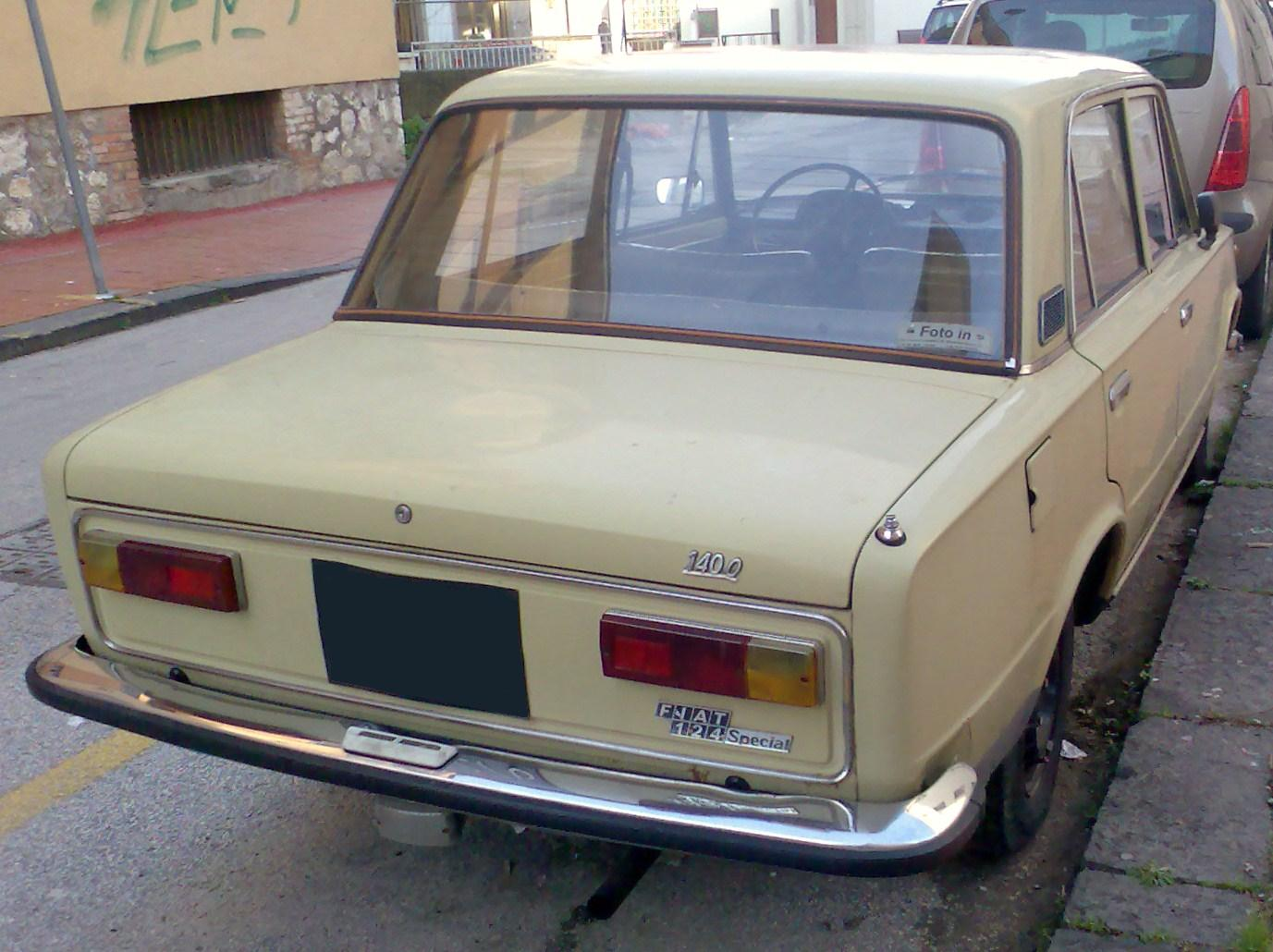
Fiat 124 Special 1400

The renewed Special sported a completely redesigned front end. A black, square-mesh radiator grille was crossed by a horizontal bright bar joining the dual headlamps; each of the four round lamps was set in its own square, bright-edged housing. The grille-headlamps assembly was flanked by the turn indicators. Front and rear the bumpers had lost their over-riders, replaced by full-width rubber strips. At the rear the lamps were also new—still horizontal and rectangular in shape unlike the ones used on the standard saloon—and the whole tail panel was surrounded by a chromed profile. Inside there was a new dashboard with imitation wood inserts, carpets instead of rubber mats, and cloth upholstery. The "T" in 124 Special T stood for twin cam, hinting at the car's 1,438 cc dual overhead camshaft engine, derived from the Sport Coupé and Spider but in a milder state of tune. Coded 124 AC.300, this engine had revised valve timing and fuel system and produced 80 DIN-rated PS (59 kW; 79 hp) at 5,800 rpm and 112 DIN-rated N⋅m (83 lb⋅ft) of torque at 4,000 rpm. According to the manufacturer top speed was 160 km/h (99 mph). Externally the Special T was identical to the Special, save for model badging at the rear.

=== 3rd Series ===
In 1972, Fiat made a number of alterations to the 124 saloon and stationwagon, visually, mechanically and value-wise. The standard model gained 5 horsepower, with the 1.2L engine now delivering 65 DIN-rated PS (48 kW; 64 hp) and raising the saloon's top speed to 150 km/h (93 mph). This version can be distinguished by a new grille in matte black and the flush door handles already known from the Special. Inside, the dashboard received a strip of wood veneer, dark dial backgrounds, a water temperature gauge and a spot to install a radio. Instead of rubber floor mats, there was a bouclé carpet. The speedometer scale went from 0 to 170 km/h (106 mph) rather than 160 km/h (99 mph). Also the 1.4L engine in the 124 Special gained 5 PS (3.7 kW), raising its top speed to 155 km/h (96 mph). The 124 Special T was now also available with the 1.6L twin cam engine from the Fiat 132 saloon and 124 sports models, producing 95 PS (70 kW; 94 hp) and a top speed of 170 km/h (106 mph). A 5-speed gearbox was available as an option on the 124 Special T. These 124 Special and Special T versions can be recognized by two horizontal air intakes between the grille and front bumper.

== Engines ==
Power came from a 1.2 L (1,197 cc) Fiat OHV inline-four engine. Also, there were the 124 Special with a 1,438 cc OHV engine and the 124 Special T with 1,438 cc and 1,592 cc twin cam OHC engines. The twin cams are connected to a four-speed and five-speed gearbox.

- 1200 (1,197 cc) – 60–65 PS (44–48 kW; 59–64 hp) (1966–1974)
- 1400 (1,438 cc) – 70–75 PS (51–55 kW; 69–74 hp) (1968–1974)
- 1400 Special T (1,438 cc) Twin cam – 80 PS (59 kW; 79 hp) (1970–1972)
- 1600 Special T (1,592 cc) Twin cam – 95 PS (70 kW; 94 hp) (1973–1974)

== Foreign production ==
Throughout the 1960s and 1970s, Fiat sought to extend its worldwide reach by licensing the 124 design following its discontinuation in mainstream Western European markets, including the widely known and most produced derivative, the Soviet-built Lada, which sold over 15 million units.

=== Soviet Union/Russia ===
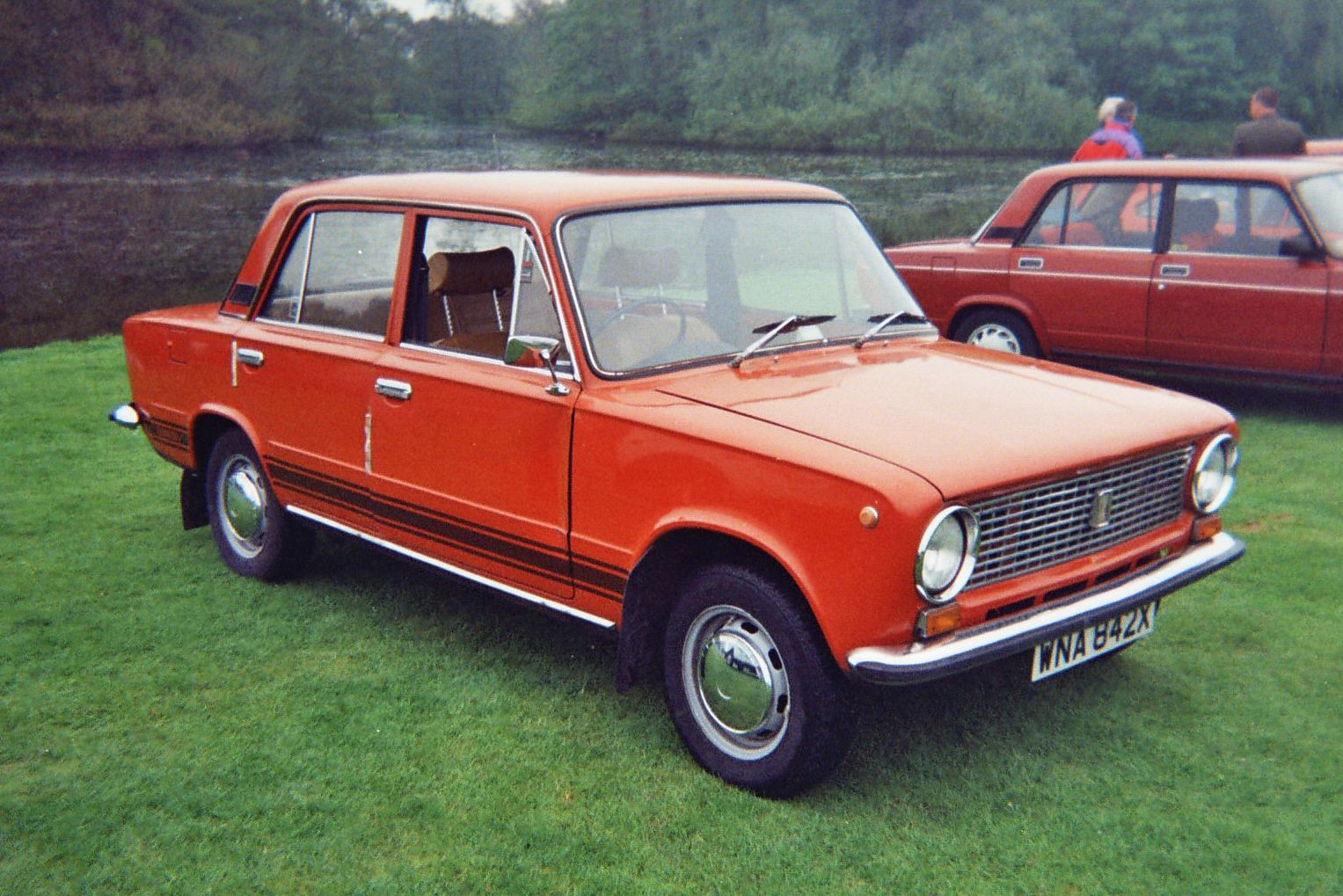
VAZ-2101

In 1966, Fiat entered into a collaborative agreement with the Soviet government to establish car manufacture in the Samara region of Russia. Fiat was contracted to take part in the creation of the massive VAZ plant in the newly created town of Togliatti, named after the Italian communist leader of the same name. The factory produced an adapted version 124R of the 124, known as the VAZ-2101 "Zhiguli" (sold as the Lada 1200/1300 in export markets), until 1982, and 1200s until 1987. Based on the 124, they were modified at more than 800 points, the major modifications having an entirely different OHC engine, hydraulic clutch, drum brakes at the rear, modified suspensions, etc. Early modifications include the VAZ-2102 (station wagon), 2103 (Lada 1500), 2106 (Lada 1600) and 21011 (Lada 1300). The updated and restyled versions of the 124-based design were produced until September 2012, as the VAZ-2104, 2105 and 2107 – marketed as the Lada Riva in UK markets. Production of this line reached 17,332,954 cars, this being the third largest production volume for a car in automotive history.

=== Spain ===
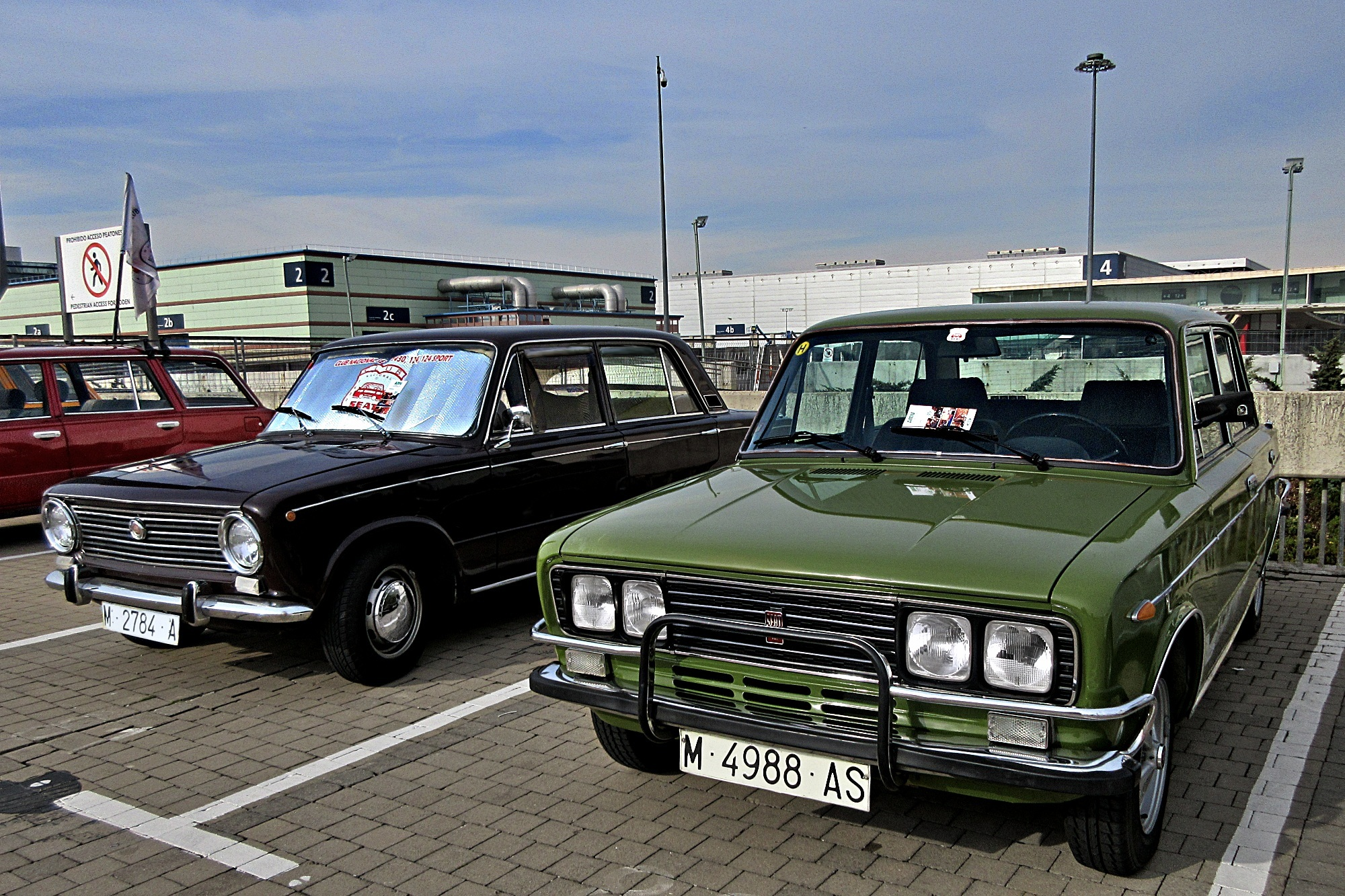
SEAT 124 (left) & SEAT 1430 (right)

In the frame of the licence agreement between Fiat and SEAT, it was produced and sold in Spain with the name SEAT 124 from 1968 to 1975. Also a clone from the 124 Special with some elements from Fiat 125 was produced from 1969 to 1975 with the 1438 cc engine along with the twin-cams known as the "FUs" 1,600 cc (1970–72), and 1,800 cc (1972–75) branded as SEAT 1430.

In 1975 when Fiat stopped production of the Fiat 124, the SEAT 124 had a minor facelift done by Giorgetto Giugiaro changing the aesthetics of the car by changing the round headlamps to rectangular design and integrating taillights into the body. This car was known as the SEAT 124D and remained in production until 1980 with the Sport versions now codenamed the "FLs", FL-40/45 1,600 cc 90HP, FL-80/82 1,800 cc 114HP and FL-90 1,919 cc 114HP.

The 124 was very successful in Spain, and was sold in both the four-door and station wagon versions.

=== India ===
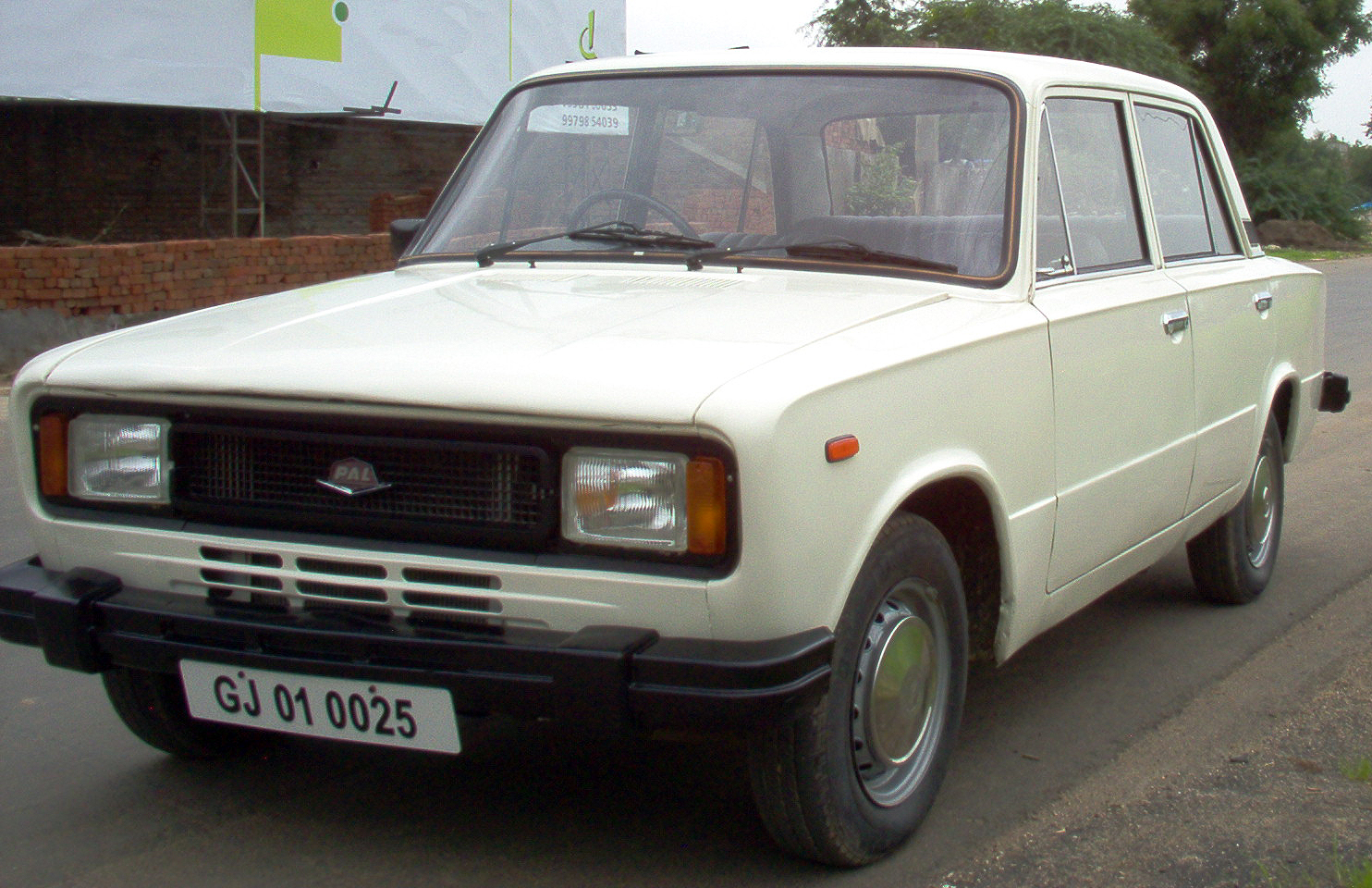
1989 Premier 118NE

The Fiat 124 was also introduced in India by Premier Automobiles Limited. In 1981 Premier began the process of acquiring the production tooling for the facelifted SEAT 124 D after authorisation from Fiat. The model was released in the autumn of 1985 as the Premier 118NE. The car was similar to the 1975 face-lifted version of SEAT 124. However, Premier incorporated the Nissan A12 (1,171 cc and 52 bhp) powertrain instead of the original Fiat engine along with a Nissan manual gearbox. Added in 1996, there was also a version called the 1.38D which sported a diesel engine, built under license from Fratelli Negri Macchine Diesel Sud of Italy.

Near the end of production an improved model called Viceroy was released in collaboration with Peugeot. Production ended in 2001.

=== Turkey ===
The Fiat 124 was also produced by Tofaş under the names "Murat 124" between 1971–1977 and "Serçe" ("sparrow" in Turkish) between 1984 and 1994, in Bursa, Turkey. 134,867 Murat 124s were produced between 1971 and 1994. Tofaş concurrently produced the Fiat 131 series under the name Murat 131 between 1976 and 2002. Today, the company manufactures bona fide Fiat models.

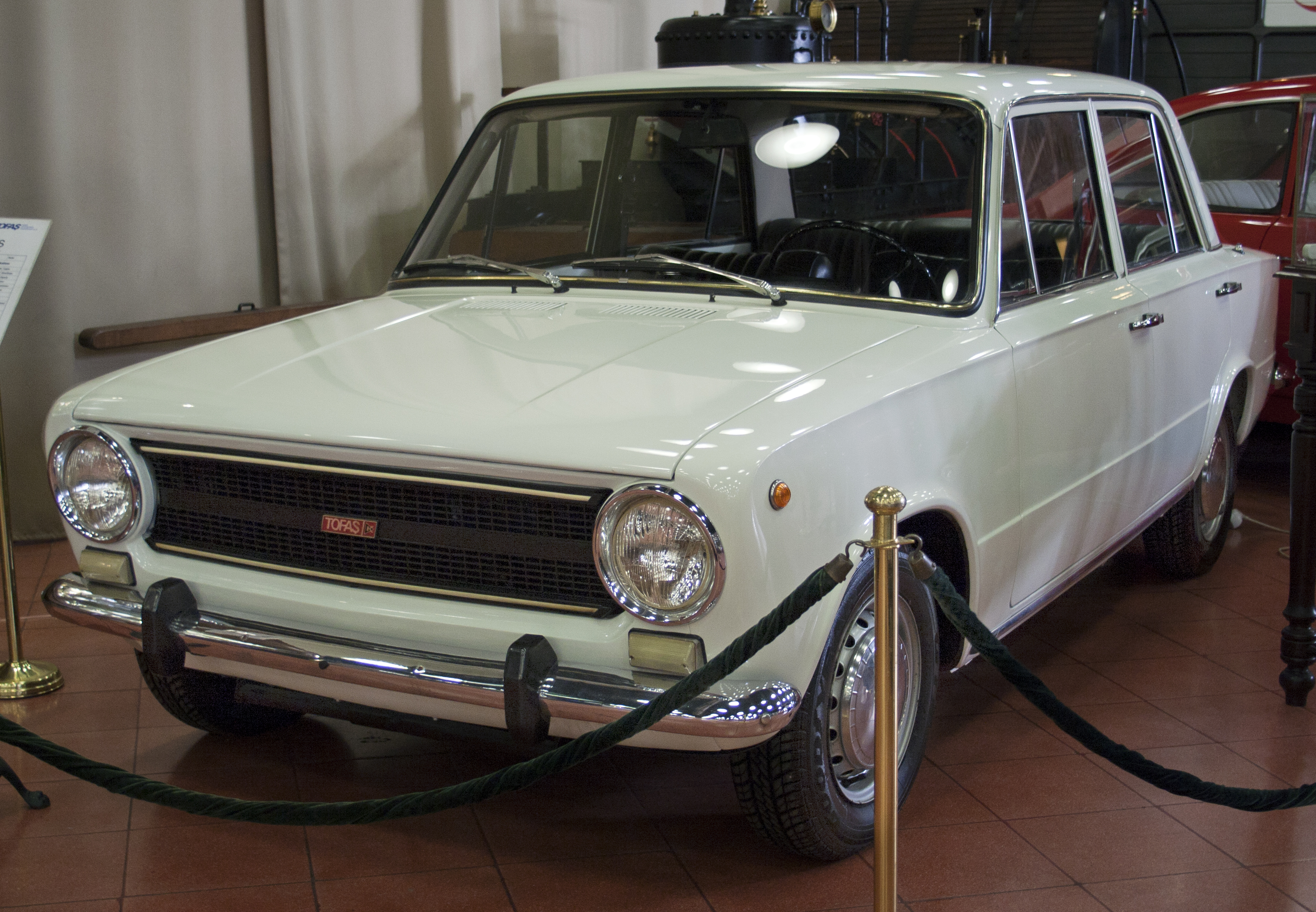
Tofaş Murat 124

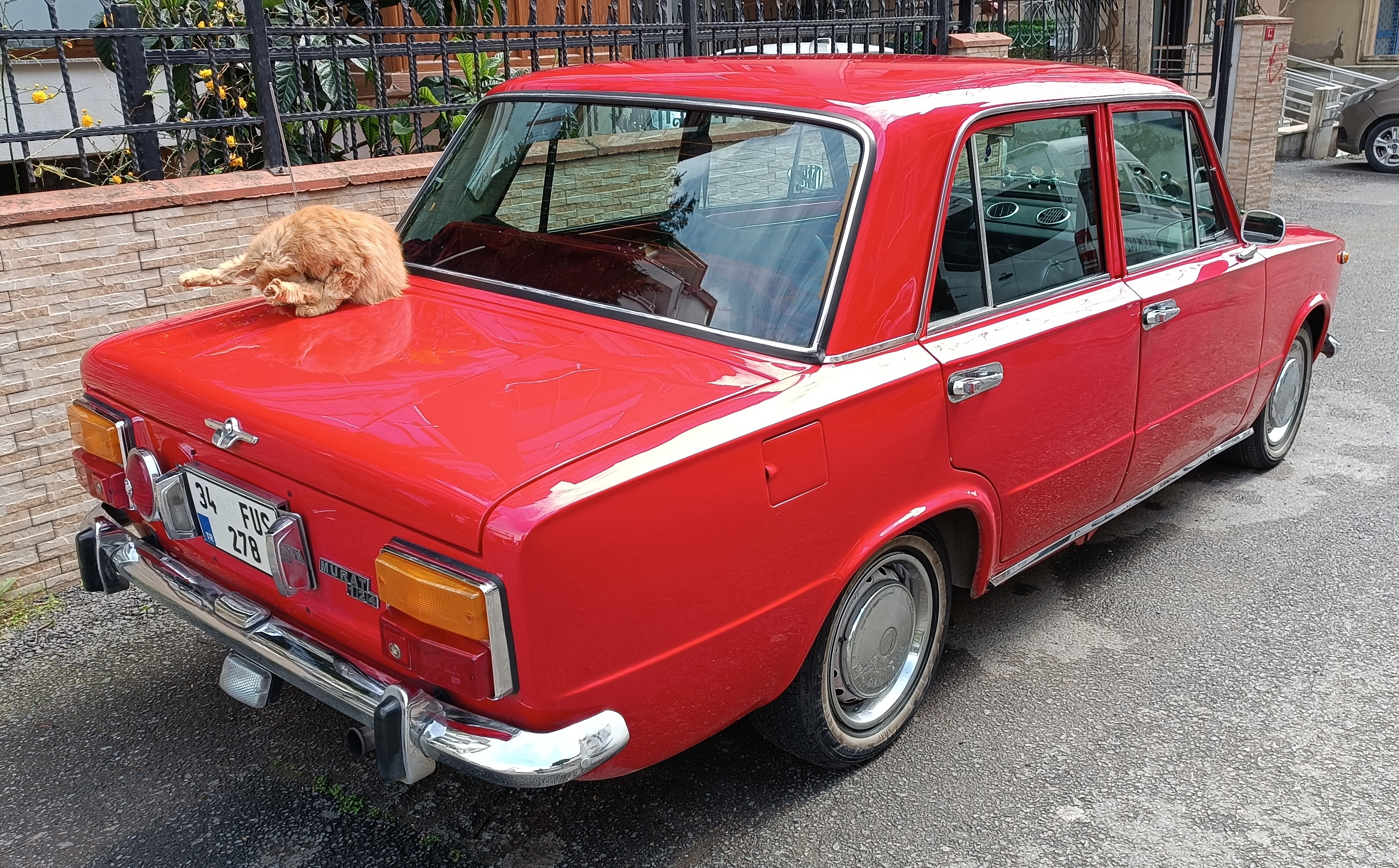
Tofaş Murat 124 (rear view)

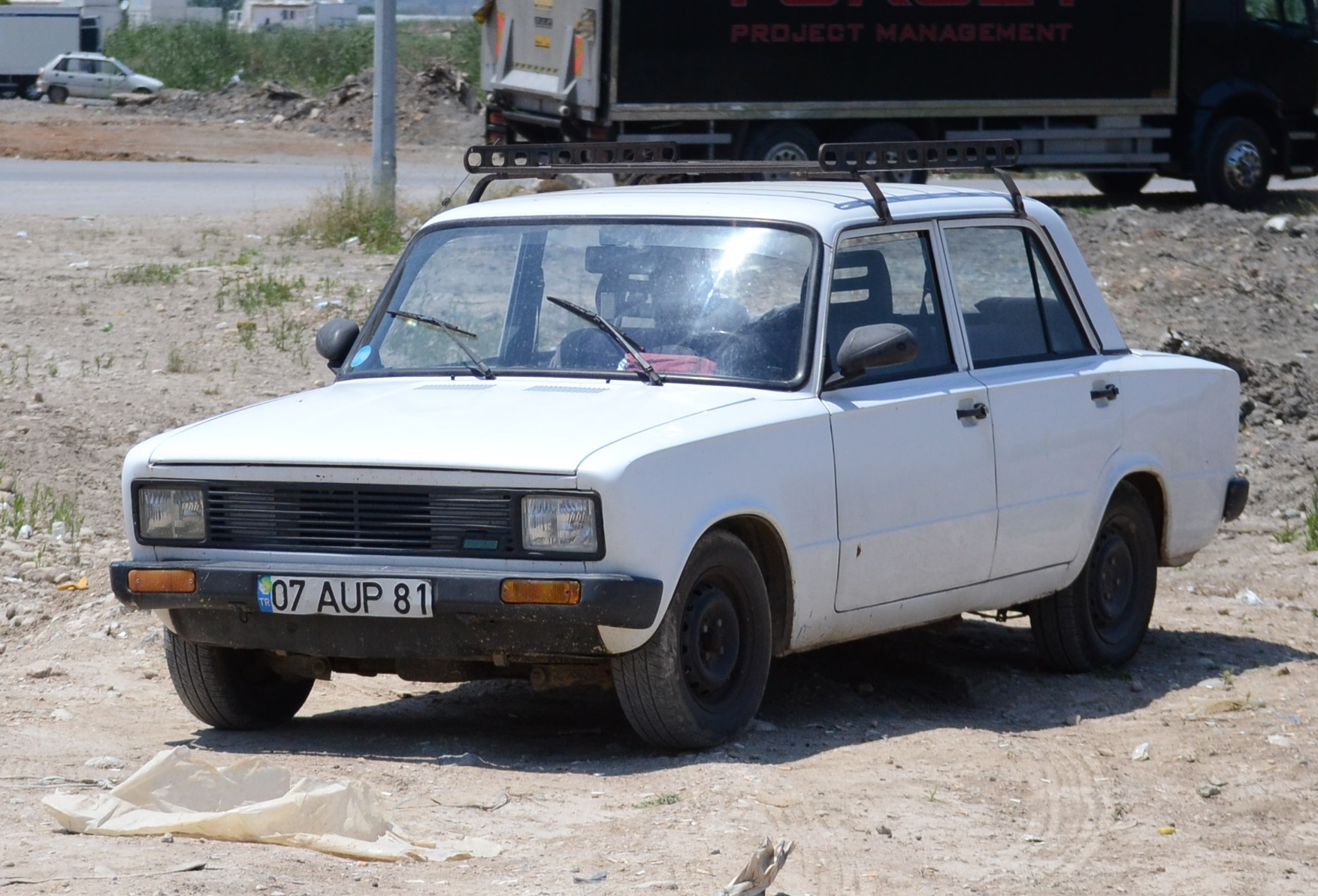
Tofaş Serçe

Tofaş Serçe (rear view)

=== Egypt ===
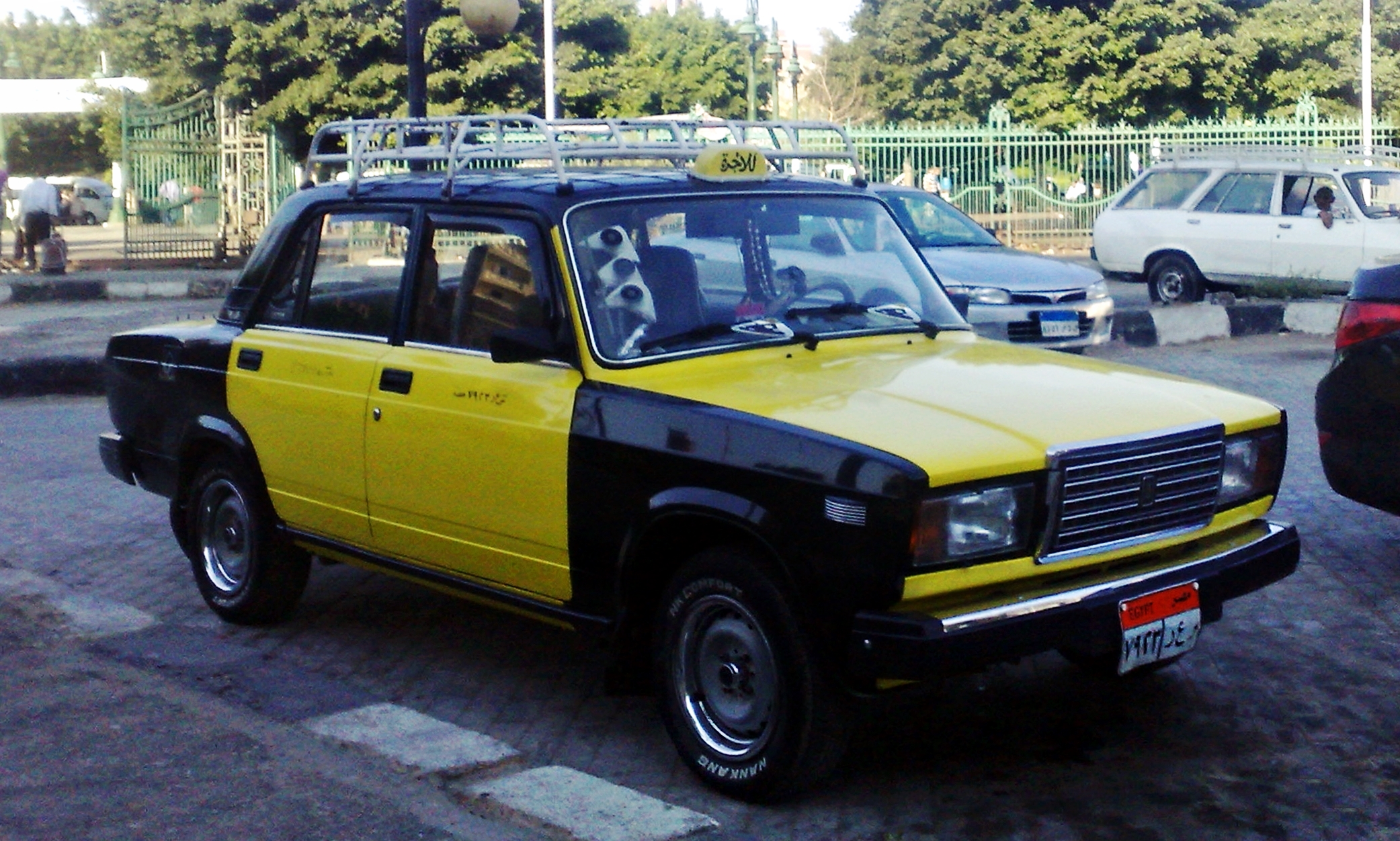
Lada 2107 as a taxi in Alexandria

From 2002 to 2007, Lada-Egypt company built at least 9,000 cars (2,200 in 2006) in the shell of VAZ-2107 (Riva), and it continues in 2012.

=== Malaysia ===
The 124 was also built at the Kilang Pembena Kereta-Kereta (KPKK) factory in Tampoi, Johor, since the latter half of 1967. The cars were distributed by Sharikat Fiat Distributors. Originally only available with the 1.2-litre engine with 60 hp (44 kW), in late 1969 the sportier 124 Special joined the lineup. This version has twin headlamps, and the larger, pushrod 1.4-litre engine with 70 hp (51 kW). In late 1971, about a year after its introduction in Italy, the twin-cam 124 Special T also joined the Malaysian production line.

=== Bulgaria ===
The Fiat 124 was also produced under the name Pirin-Fiat in Lovech, Bulgaria, on the basis of complete knockdown (CKD) kits between 1967 and 1971.

=== Korea ===
The Fiat 124 was also produced under the name Fiat-KIA 124 by Asia Motors in South Korea, between 1970 and 1975. In total 6775 units were assembled.

== Related models ==
=== Fiat 124 Sport Coupé ===
A two-door, four-seater notchback coupé based on the Fiat 124 was produced in three generations between 1967 and 1975.

=== Fiat 124 Sport Spider ===
A convertible sports car based on the Fiat 124 was produced for model years 1966–1982 and by Pininfarina for 1982–1985 model years.

=== Fiat 124 Cabriolet ===
At Salone dell'Automobile of Torino in 1966, Carrozzeria Touring presented a convertible version of Fiat 124 saloon. It was the last car built by Touring. Only one example was made. Reactions were positive, but the Fiat CEO terminated this project in favour of the Pininfarina-styled 124 Sport Spider.

=== Fiat ESV 2500 ===
The ESV 2500 is an Experimental Safety Vehicle that Fiat developed in 1972 based on its 124 model. It had a totally new 5-door three-box design, with an extra strong passenger cell, but used the mechanicals of the standard 124 with 1438 cm3 engine. The ESV 2500's weight was 43 % higher than that of the original 124.

=== Moretti Fiat 124 Coupé ===
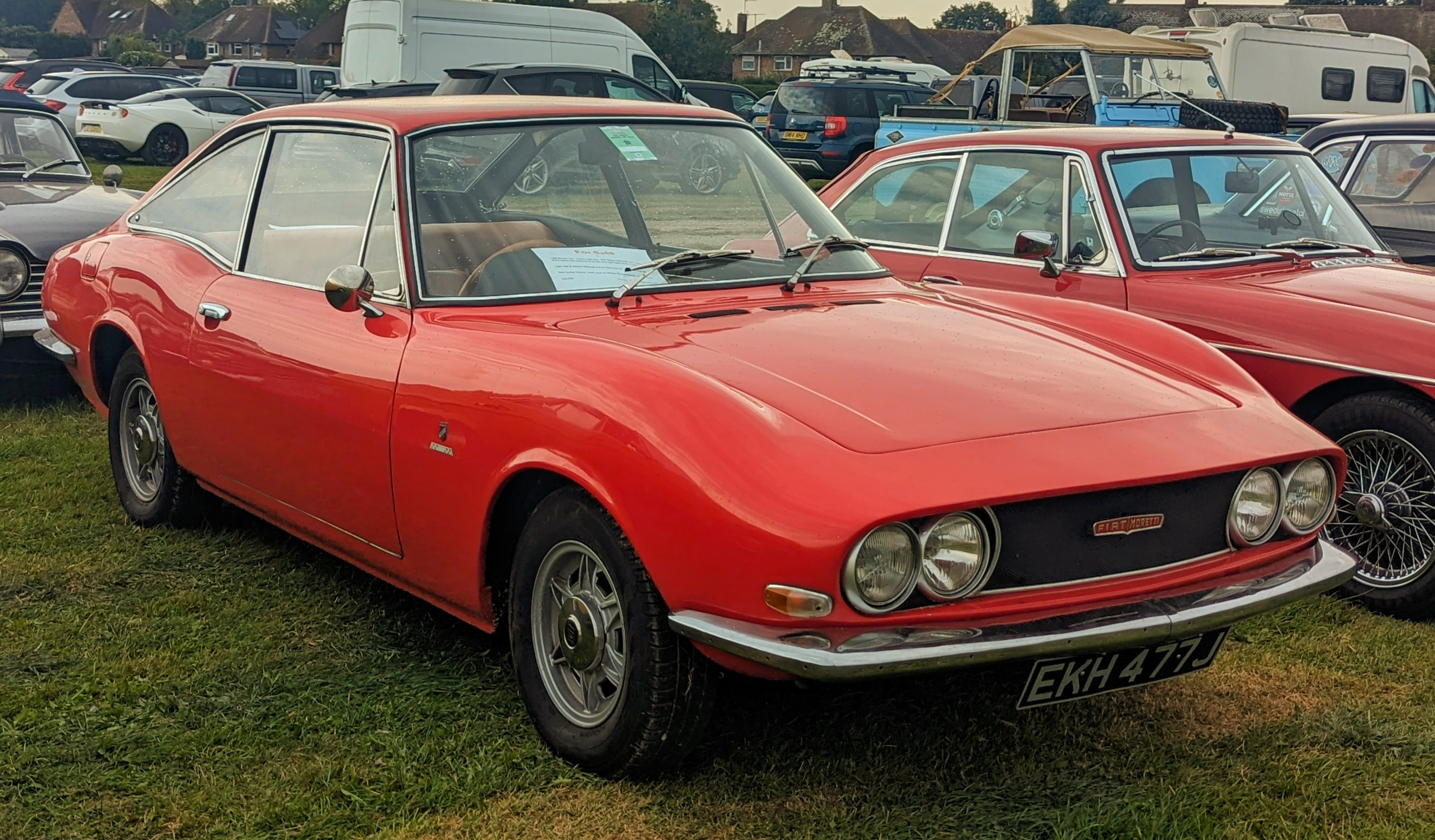
Moretti Fiat 124 Coupé

The Moretti Motor Company presented at the Turin Motor Show in March 1967 a coupé based on the Fiat 124. Moretti updated the coupe in 1968 by fitting the 1.4-litre engine of the 124S. The 2 versions of the Moretti Coupé (± 60 units) were marketed by the Fiat network in Italy.
