= RSV =

RSV may refer to:

== Biology and medicine ==
- Respiratory syncytial virus, causing respiratory disease
- Rous sarcoma virus, causing cancer in chickens

== Organisations ==
- Royal Society of Victoria, a scientific society in Australia
- Rijn-Schelde-Verolme, a former Dutch shipbuilder

== Transportation ==
- Minicar RSV, a US safety concept car
- RSV, a prefix for several Aprilia motorcycles
- Renard, Stampe & Vertongen, a prefix for several Stampe et Vertongen aircraft
- Research Survey Vessel (ship prefix)
  - USV RSV (Marine Tech), a French unmanned remote survey vehicle

== Other uses ==
- Revised Standard Version, an English Bible translation
