= Volvo SCC =

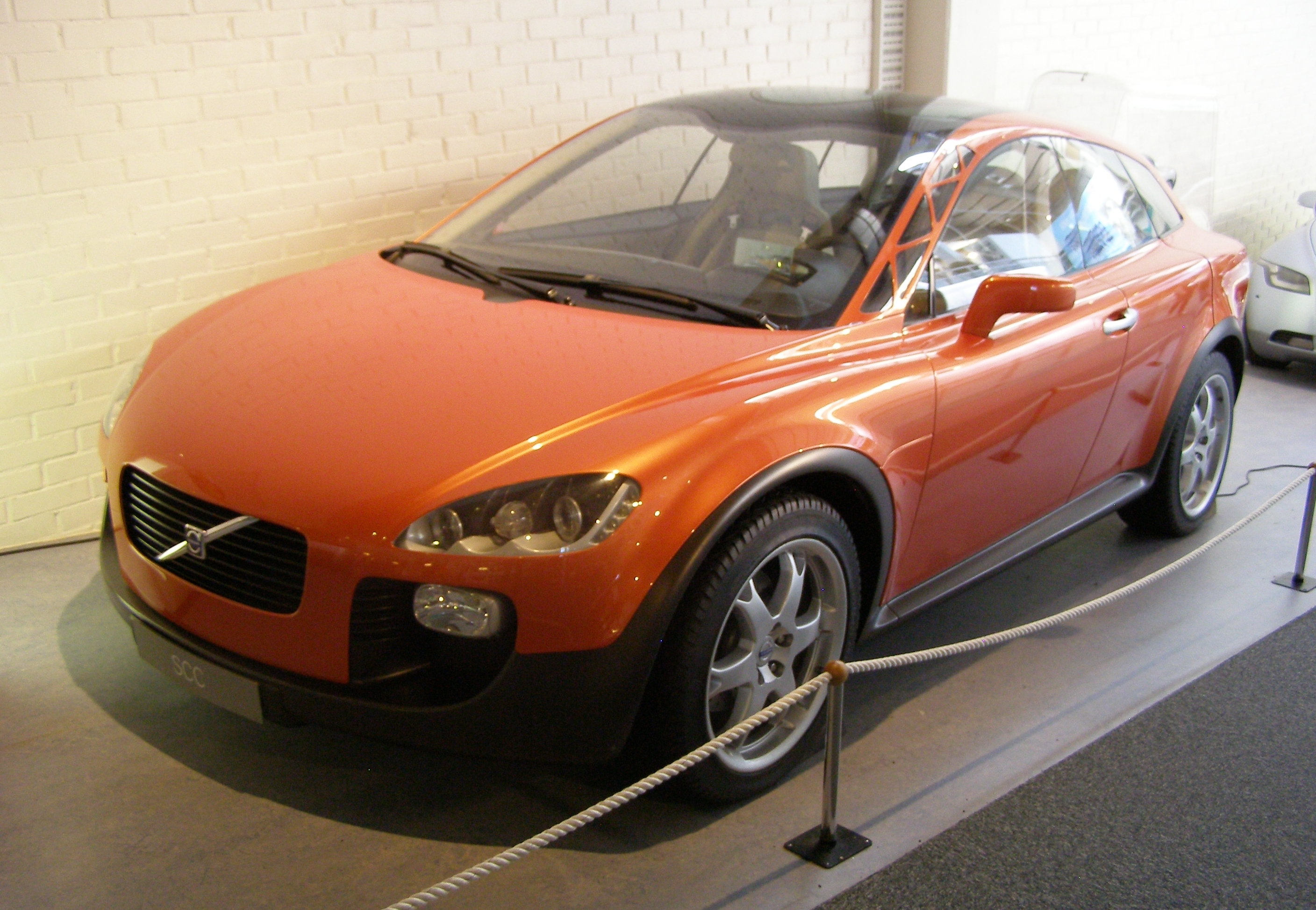

Overview
- Manufacturer: Volvo Cars
- Also called: Volvo Safety Concept Car
- Production: 2001 (Concept car)
- Designer: Stefan Jansson

Body and chassis
- Class: Small family car (C)
- Body style: 5-door hatchback coupe
- Layout: Front engine rear-wheel-drive
- Related: Volvo C30

The Volvo Safety Concept Car (SCC) is an ESV concept car. The SCC incorporates the rear hatch design from Volvo P1800ES and the glass hatch from Volvo 480ES. The interior design is similar to the S40 and V50; the majority of parts including the instrument panel, 'floating' centre stack and steering wheel are shared by the three cars. Its doors open in a manner of front conventional doors and rear small sliding doors.

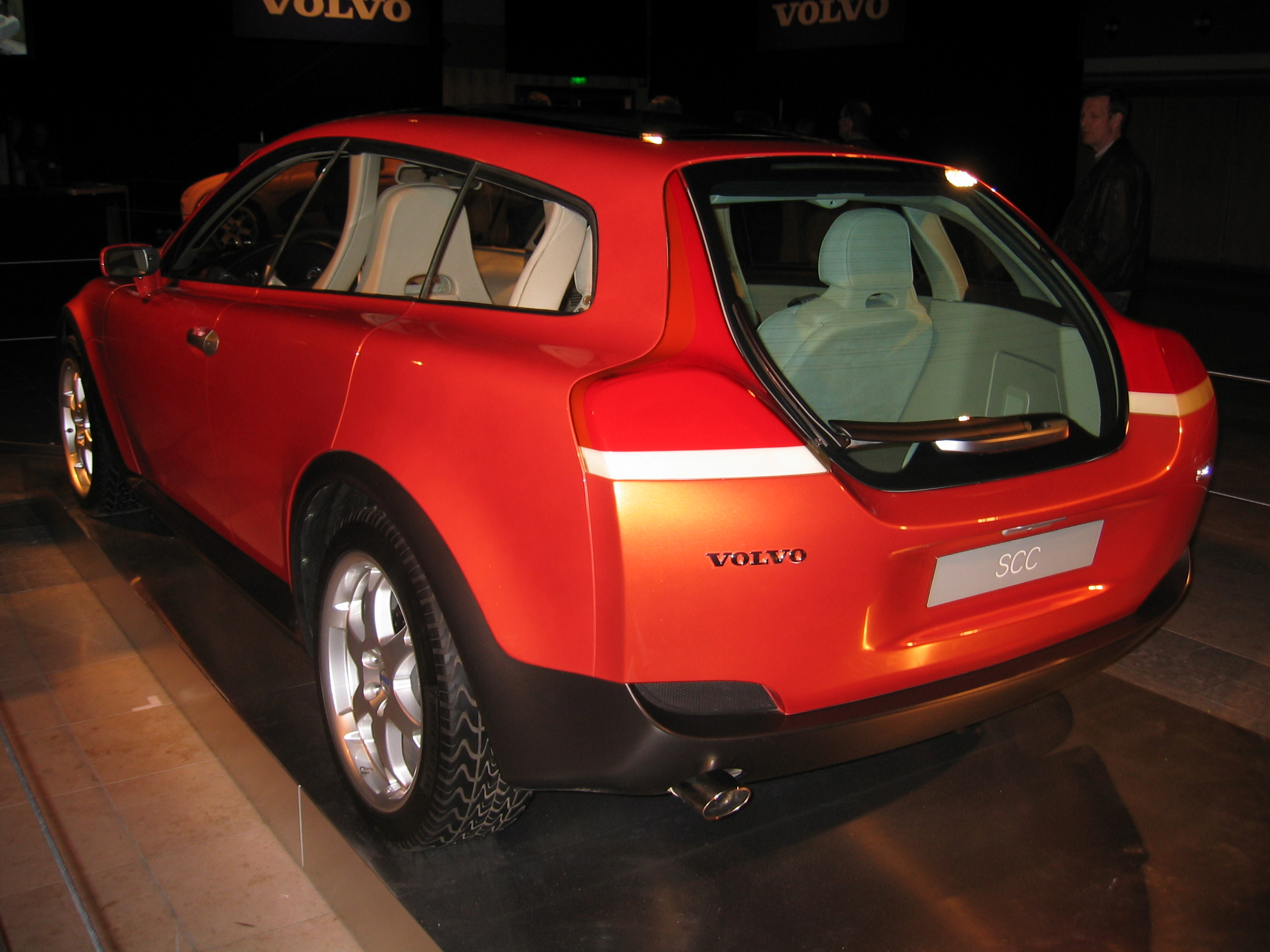
Volvo SCC (rear view).

The vehicle was unveiled in the 2001 Detroit Auto Show, and later in Seville International Airport in southern Spain in Autumn. Production model of C30 was planned in 2002. The car was the first and, to date, the only car to have an experimental criss cross seatbelt. Design elements from the car were later used in the Volvo C30, which went into production in the end of 2006.

== Safety features ==
Safety features include:

- Forward collision warning.
- Information projected on the windscreen.
- Technology that monitors vehicles in the "blind spot" and alerts the driver.
- Warning system to alert the driver to the risk of straying from the lane.
- Cruise control that maintains a set distance behind the vehicle in front.
- Flashing brake lights during hard braking.
- Safety cameras.
- Advanced headlights that follow the curvature of the road as the car turns.
- Further developed HMI (Human Machine Interface)
- See through A-pillars for increased front view visibility
- Height adjustable rear seat.
- Protection for pedestrians.
- Steering wheel adjustable for height and reach.
- Passive unlocking and engine starting.
- Communication with the car via mobile phone.
- Doors in manner with front conventional doors and rear small sliding doors.
