= Fiat ESVs =

1970s series of safety research vehicles

Fiat ESVs (Experimental Safety Vehicle) are a small series of prototypes built by Fiat in the early 1970s, intended for research on passive safety features.

== History ==
In Spring 1971, Fiat starts a project to research passive safety of small (up to 1,200 lb, 540 kg) and middle class cars (up to 1,800 lb, 820 kg). In that year, the Fiat 500 has a 23.3% market share in Italy, and thus is an important factor in the safety on the Italian roads. In the same year, the American organization NHSB - National Highway Safety Bureau (later known as National Highway Traffic Safety Administration, NHTSA) launches a competition reserved for American manufacturers, for the construction of an entirely new vehicle, intended to guarantee maximum passive safety.

At the end of 1971, only two American manufacturers, which do not even produce automobiles, have applied to the NHSB competition. Given the lack of interest, it is decided to extend the offer to all global manufacturers. In 1972, the American manufacturers Ford and General Motors as well as Fiat, Daimler-Benz, Volkswagen, Nissan and Honda join this initiative.

These ESV cars are designed on the basis of the specifications established during the various conferences held around the world: January 1971 in Paris, France; September 1971 in Sindelfingen, Germany; July 1972 in Washington DC; March 1973 in Kyoto, Japan and June 1974, in London, England.

Fiat is the only manufacturer in the NHSB project to present one model each in three different weight categories. They stand out with very visible black protection of the front and rear of the cars, and have the ESV logo and a number indicating the weight of the vehicle in pounds, as prescribed in the American specifications.

The main safety test requirements of this project are protection of the passengers in:

- a frontal or rear collision against a barrier at 80 km/h (50 mph)
- a collision against a pole, frontal or at the rear, at 80 km/h (50 mph)
- a lateral collision against a pole at a speed of 24 km/h (15 mph)
- case of a rollover

As main differences with the standard cars they are based on, the three Fiat ESVs have in common: a reinforced inner skeleton, big polyurethane bumpers (in two versions: one developed by Pirelli with air chambers, the other filled with foam) at both ends with matching side protection strips, and a padded interior. The weight increase varies between 43% for the largest model and 50% for the smallest model. Also the production cost goes up, between 37% and 43%. Due to the higher weight, the cars all need a larger engine than standard, and the fuel consumption increases. Also the suspension is enforced and the wheels and tires are a size bigger than standard.

In all, Fiat produces 47 ESV vehicles between 1972 and 1974, at a total cost of 4.5 billion Lire (40-50 million euros). None of the experimental models designed by Fiat (or the other companies participating in this automotive safety experiment) makes it to mass production, but many elements can be seen on production models in the years to follow. Examples of the Fiat ESVs are the shock absorbing bumpers, fuel tank behind the rear seat and reinforced passenger cell with side impact protection bars in the doors of the Fiat 131, introduced in 1974 for Europe and in 1975 for the USA.

Most of the Fiat ESVs are scrapped, but three are kept and are on display at the Heritage HUB in Turin, Italy.

== Fiat ESV 1500 ==
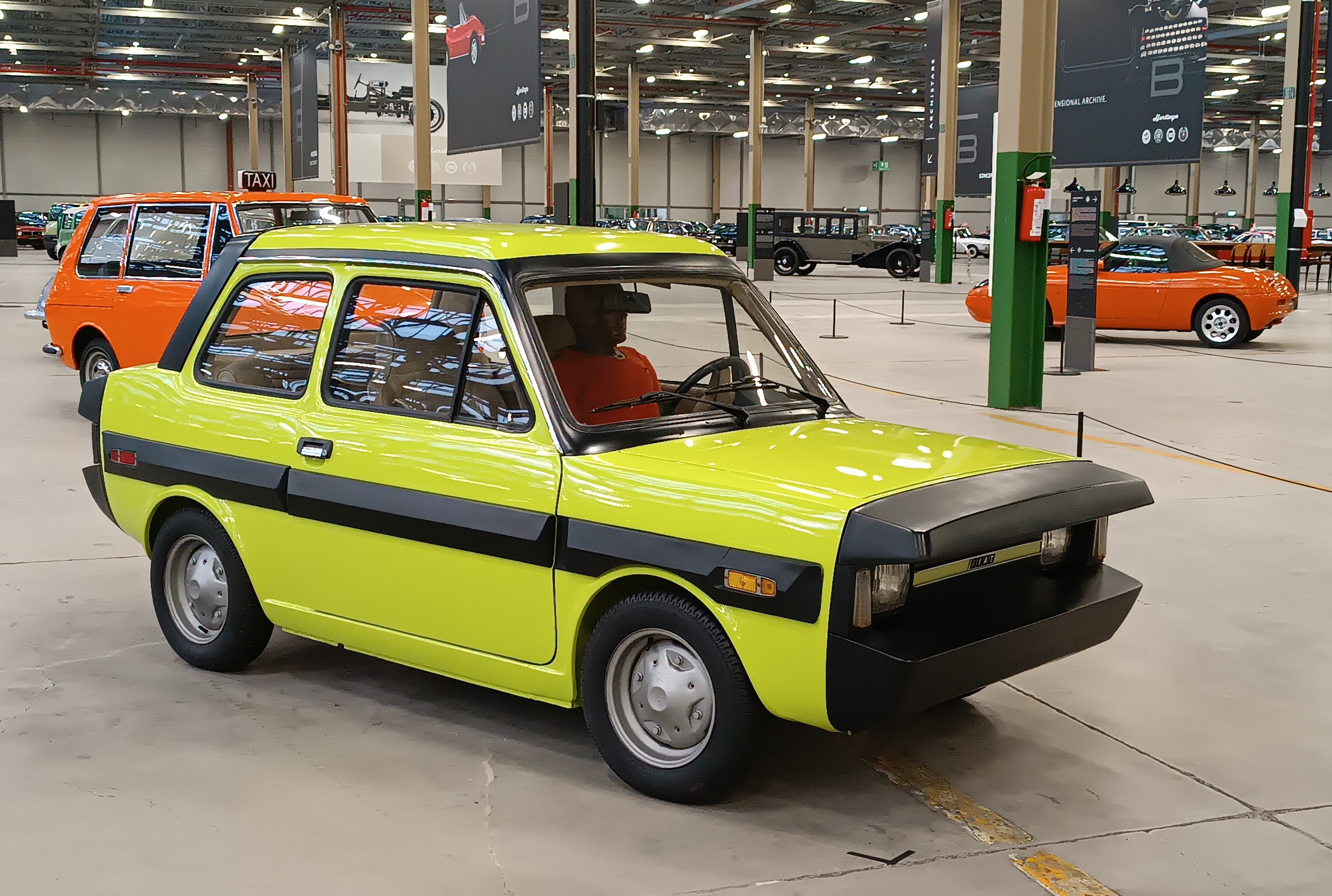
Fiat ESV 1500

The ESV 1500 project commences before the NHSB invitation to join the program. It is derived from the Fiat 500, with rear engine and rear-wheel drive, and is presented at the 1972 convention in Washington DC. Originally, it weighs no more than the targeted 680 kg (1,500 lb), with styling done by the engineers, who borrow certain elements from the yet-to-be-released Fiat 126. After the presentation, Fiat updates the experimental model for the 1973 presentation in Kyoto as the first versions would not pass the frontal pole collision test.

The extra reinforcements mean that the eventual prototype weighs 780 kg (1,720 lb). This means it is above the target of 1,500 lb (680 kg). Because of its weight, it is fitted with an enlarged engine: 600 cc instead of 500 cc. One of the safety features that Fiat also tests in the ESV 1500, is the use of airbags, among other restraint systems. The conclusion is that at that time, there is no satisfactory restraint system for speeds of 50 mph (80 km/h) for a car of this size, including airbags. In total, thirteen ESV 1500 prototypes are built.

== Fiat ESV 2000 ==
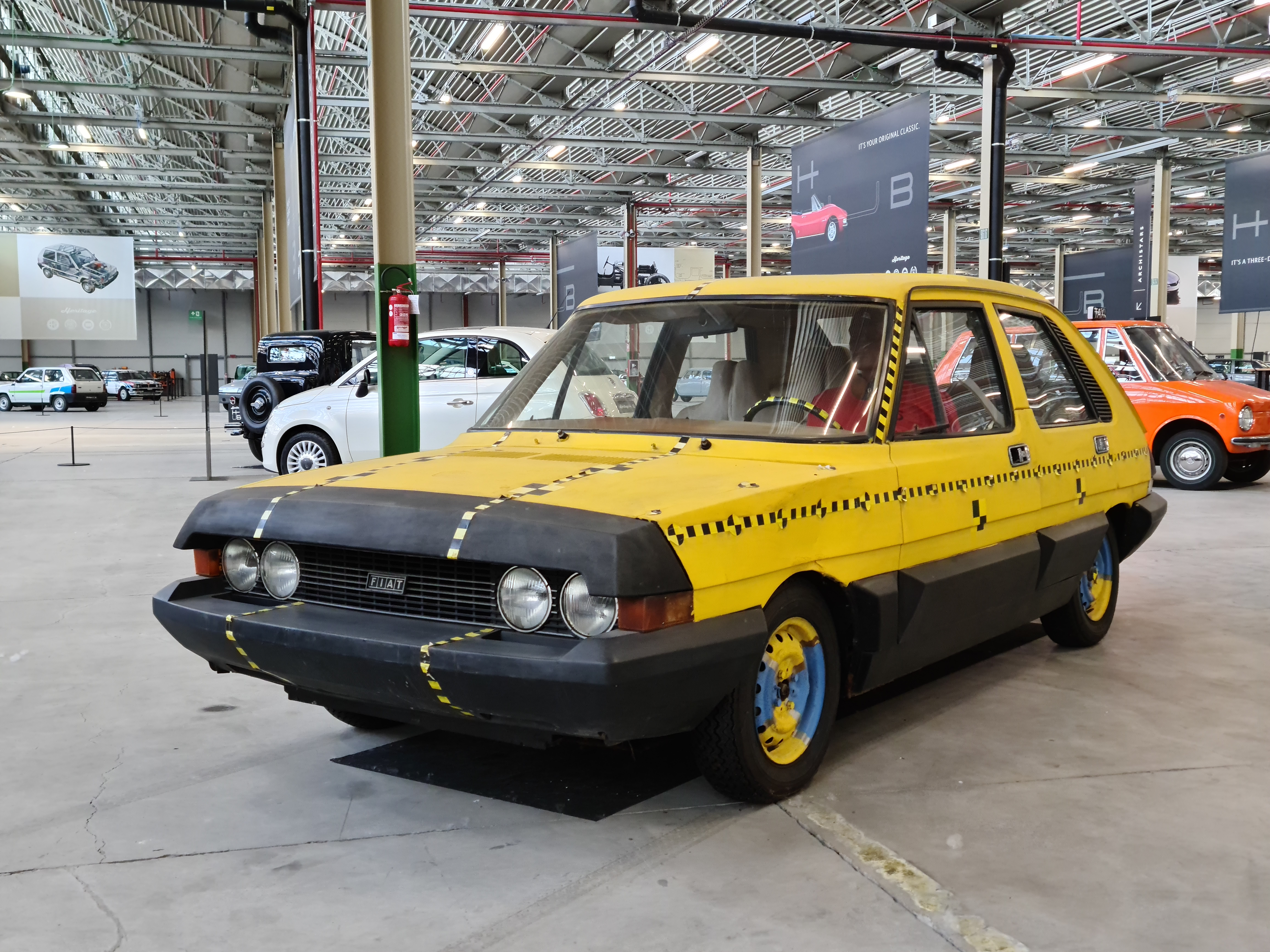
Fiat ESV 2000

The ESV 2000 is first presented in 1973, in Kyoto. It has five doors and front wheel drive; it is derived from the 128. The engine displacement is 1300 cc instead of 1100 cc, because the car weighs 360 kg (794 lb) more than the standard model. For the styling of this car, Fiat Centro Stile is asked to make the proposals. While the original Fiat 128 is not marketed with five doors Fiat decides to add a tailgate for the ESV 2000 to provide an additional emergency exit.

Also, the windshield is deeply curved so it sits further from the front occupants' heads than in the 128, without any change in the position and rake of the original A-pillars. The roof is slightly raised from the B-pillar aft, to allow for an extra strong roll-over bar. Finally, the spare wheel is moved from the engine bay to the trunk and the fuel tank is moved forward from below the trunk to right behind the passenger compartment. In testing, the concessions to the styling of the car that the Centro Stile wanted, turn out to have negative consequences for the crash test results. Twenty examples of the ESV 2000 are built.

== Fiat ESV 2500 ==
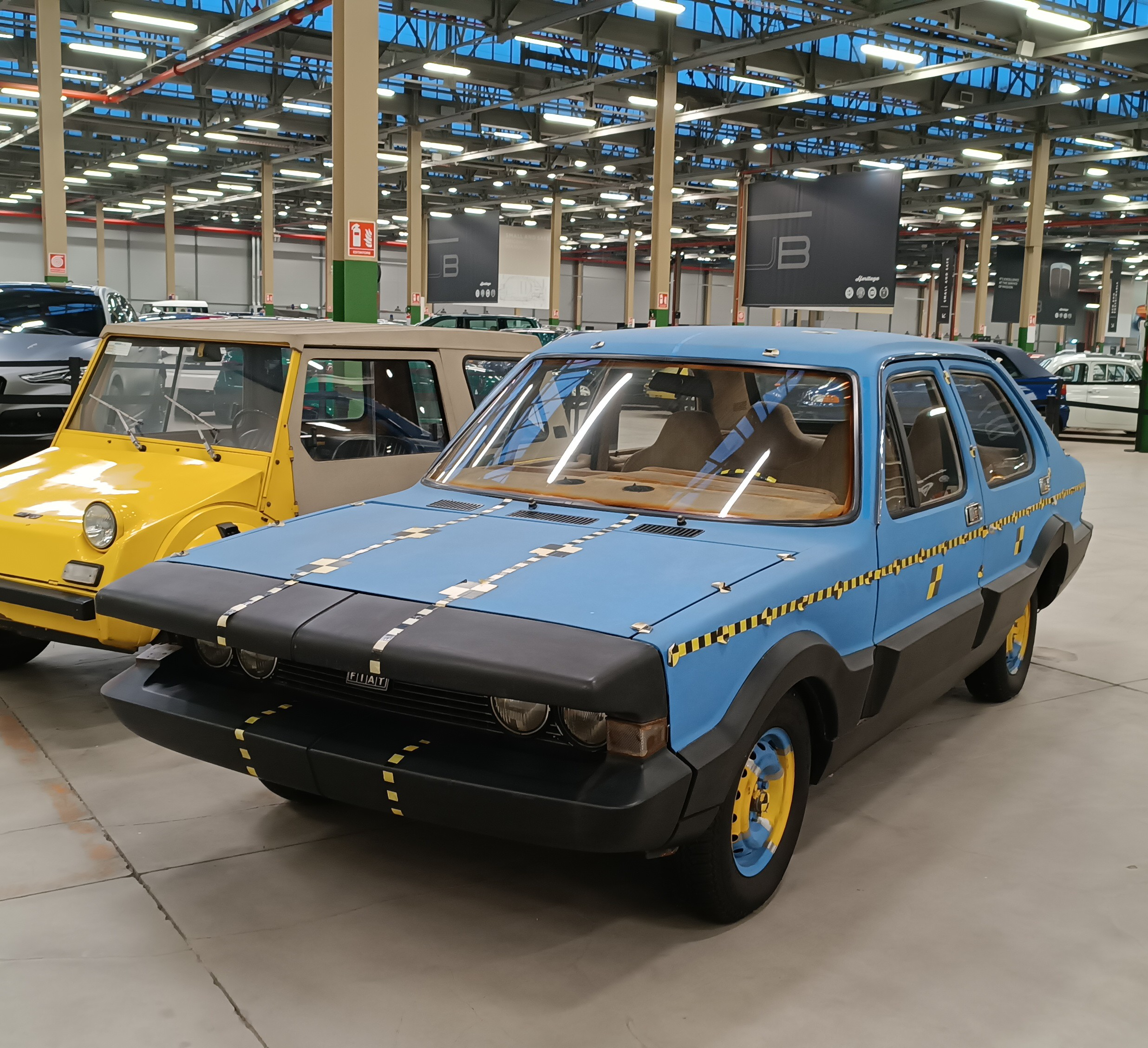
Fiat ESV 2500

The ESV 2500 is based on the Fiat 124 and has a front engine with rear wheel drive. In terms of weight, it is almost twice the 124, and it would also cost much more, thus making it unviable on the market. Although the shape of the car remains that of a three box sedan, the ESV 2500 gets a tailgate like the ESV 2000. Also here the windshield is curved compared to the original, and the fuel tank is moved to a safer position right behind the passenger compartment.
