= Aurora (1957 automobile) =

Cover of magazine featuring Aurora safety car

The Aurora was an American automobile prototype manufactured by Father Alfred A. Juliano, a Catholic priest, from 1957 to 1958. The Aurora is arguably the first Experimental Safety Vehicle ever made, even before the coinage of the ESV initialism. This safety car was to be available with a Chrysler, Cadillac, or Lincoln engine, built on a Buick chassis. However, the Aurora Motor Company of Branford, Connecticut, partially funded by Juliano's congregation, went out of business after producing just one $30,000 prototype.

Juliano had studied art before entering the priesthood, and expressed a lifelong interest in automotive design. His family said that he had won a coveted scholarship from General Motors to study with Harley Earl, which arrived only after he had already been ordained. He maintained his interest in automotive design, however, which he combined with a belief that there was much which could be done to make current automobiles safer.

Conceived, invented and built by Juliano, the Aurora was an 18-foot (5.49 m) long fibreglass-bodied car that was two years on the drawing board and required three years to build. The high quality of the workmanship was "astounding", particularly in the fibreglass body and the plastic windows. At a retail price of $12,000.00, it would have been priced just under the most costly car in the U.S., the $13,000.00 Cadillac Eldorado Brougham. The body, said to be dent, rust, and corrosion proof, was specifically designed for long distance highway travel. The vehicle had a tinted, transparent, plastic "astrodome" roof with adjustable interior metal shades. Dashboard controlled hydraulic jacks mounted in the frame assisted in tire changing. The spare tire, located under the front end, was mounted on a platform which would lower the tire to the ground without manual contact.

The vehicle had many car safety-related features, novel at the time, some now routine. These features included seatbelts, a roll cage, a padded instrument panel, side-impact bars, and a collapsible steering column. The placement of the spare tire under the front end served to absorb impacts. The most innovative safety feature, which has not been incorporated into other cars, was the ability to swivel the seats to face rearwards should a collision seem imminent.

The Aurora is mainly remembered for its appearance, however, and is often cited in lists of the ugliest cars ever, frequently as the single ugliest car. This assessment is largely due to two factors, in addition to the general overwrought "swoopiness" of the car typical of the "futuristic" styling of the time: the gaping front end and the bulbous windshield, both dictated by safety considerations. The bulging windshield was designed to eliminate impact with occupants' heads, in the era prior to air bags, while the scoop-like front end served as a large, foam filled bumper, designed to scoop up not only air, but also pedestrians without injury.

The prototype had a fiberglass body over a largely wooden structure built on the salvaged chassis of a 1953 Buick, which was not adequately tested before the scheduled public unveiling in 1957 and broke down 15 times on the way to the press conference, requiring towing to 7 different garages; mainly due to clogging of the fuel system, which had sat unused for the previous four years. After the inauspicious beginning of arriving hours late for its own unveiling, the car did not inspire the public due to its appearance, lack of performance, and high price, and there were no advance orders.

The company's finances were called into question; Juliano stated that that had been instigated by General Motors, and compared himself to Preston Tucker. He was investigated by the IRS, accused by the Catholic Church of misappropriating parishioners' donations, and forced to leave the Order of the Holy Ghost. But in fact, he himself had gone deeply into personal debt financing the company, and eventually declared bankruptcy, forfeiting the prototype to a repair shop as collateral for unpaid repair bills. It passed through several hands before finally being abandoned behind a Cheshire auto body shop in 1967. Juliano died of a brain hemorrhage in 1989.

In 1993, the car was discovered by British car enthusiast Andy Saunders of Poole, Dorset, in a sketch in a book about dream cars; "It was so ugly it was unreal. I said straightaway, 'I've got to own that.'" After several years of searching, he eventually tracked the car down by the name of the garage in the background of a photograph of the car, purchased it sight unseen for $1,500, and had it shipped to Britain for another $2,000. The fiberglass and wood structure of the car proved to have deteriorated terribly from exposure, as well as the interior and plastic windshield. Restoration was further complicated by a lack of adequate documentation or even photographs of the car, the absence of the late Father Juliano to assist as a consultant, and the lack of replacement parts for a prototype vehicle. However, restoration was completed in early 2005, and the car was exhibited at the Goodwood Festival of Speed. It was recently acquired by the Lane Motor Museum in Nashville, TN and is now on display.
