= Experimental safety vehicle =

Concept cars which are used to test car safety ideas

Experimental safety vehicle (ESV) is the designation for experimental concept cars which are used to test car safety ideas.

In 1973, the U.S. DOT announced its ESV project, the aim of which was to obtain safer vehicles by 1981. A car produced by this effort was known as the Minicar RSV.

In 1991, the ESV abbreviation was backronymed to enhanced safety of vehicles.

== Some ESVs ==
- Aurora (1957), created by Father Alfred A. Juliano
- Austin Metro PSC1 – Pedestrian Safety Car One – (1985)

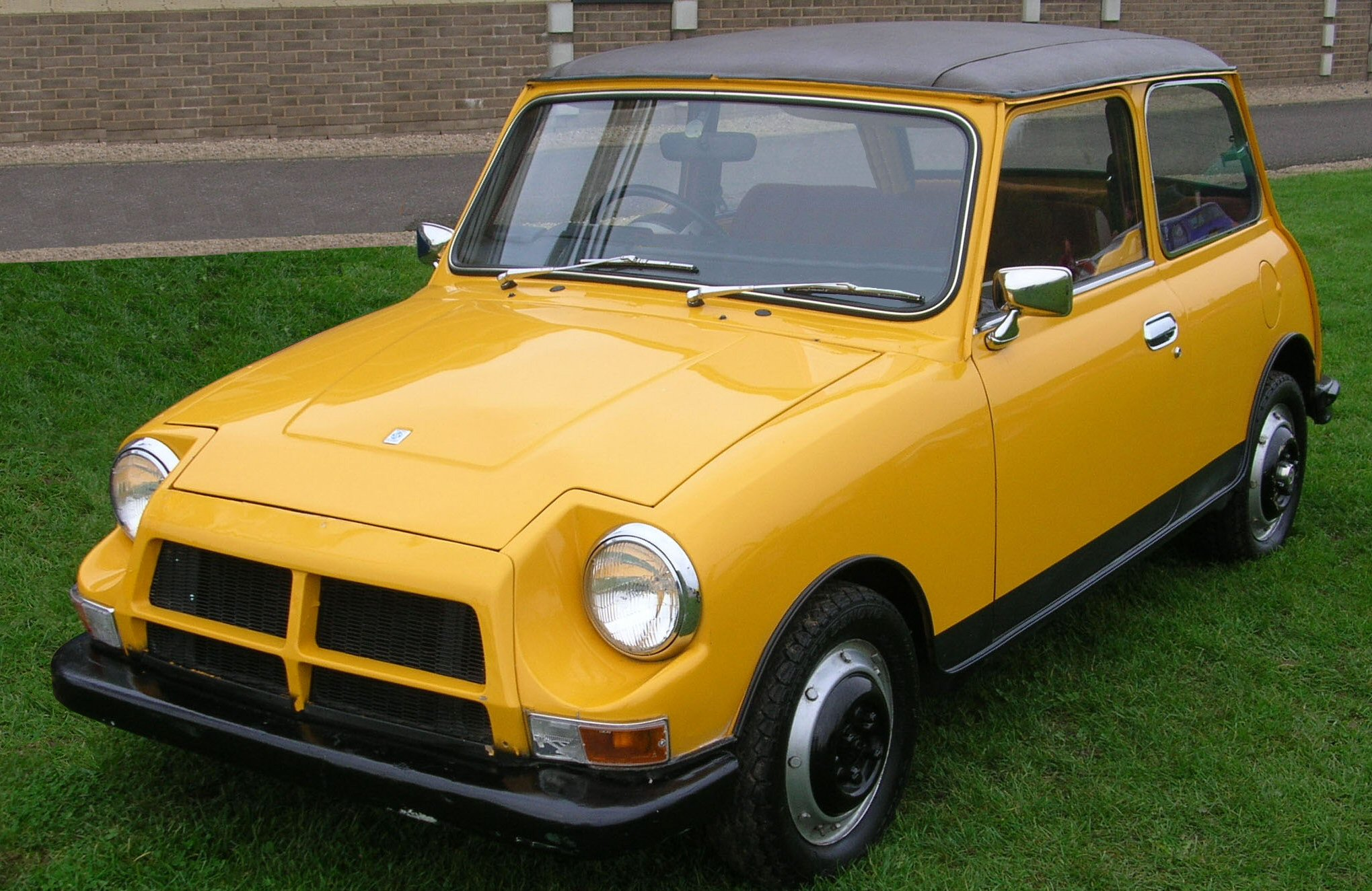
Mini SRV4 (1974)

- BLMC SSV – Safety Systems Vehicle – series
  - SSV1 based on the MGB GT (1972)
  - SRV2 based on the Morris Marina (1974)
  - SRV3 based on the BMC ADO 17 Austin 1800 badge engineered family
  - SRV4 based on the Mini
  - SRV5 based on the BMC ADO 16 Austin/Morris 1300, featuring an innovative spring-loaded pedestrian-catching bar
- Chrysler RSV – Research Safety Vehicle – based on the Simca 1307
- Cornell-Liberty Safety Car (1957), built by the Automotive Crash Injury Research Center
- Datsun ESV (1973), based on the Nissan Bluebird
- Fairchild Republic ESV (1973)
- Fiat ESVs 1500 libbre, 2000 libbre and 2500 libbre (libbre meaning 'pounds' in Italian) (1971)

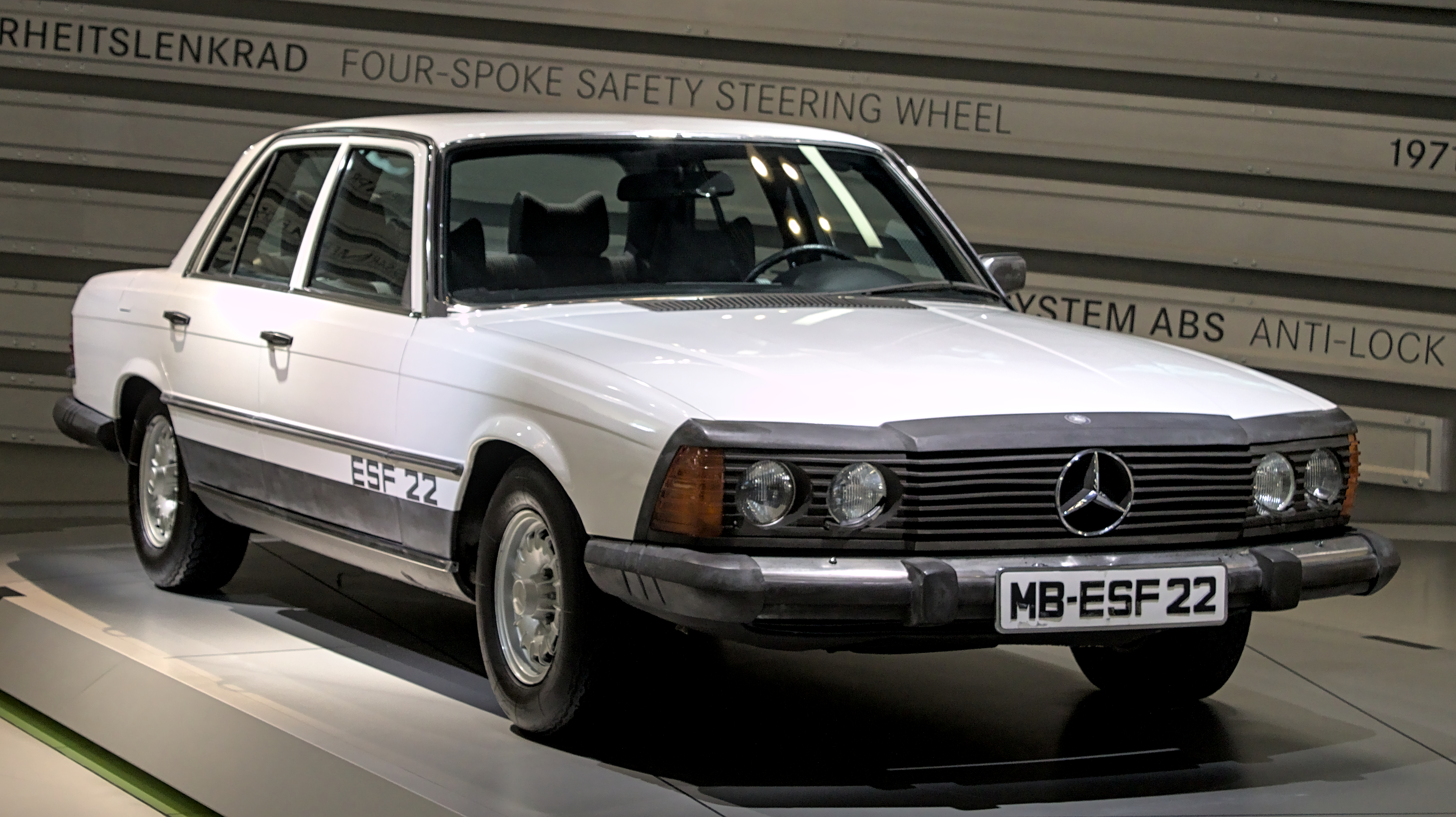
Mercedes-Benz ESF22 (1973)

- Mercedes-Benz ESV24 (1974)

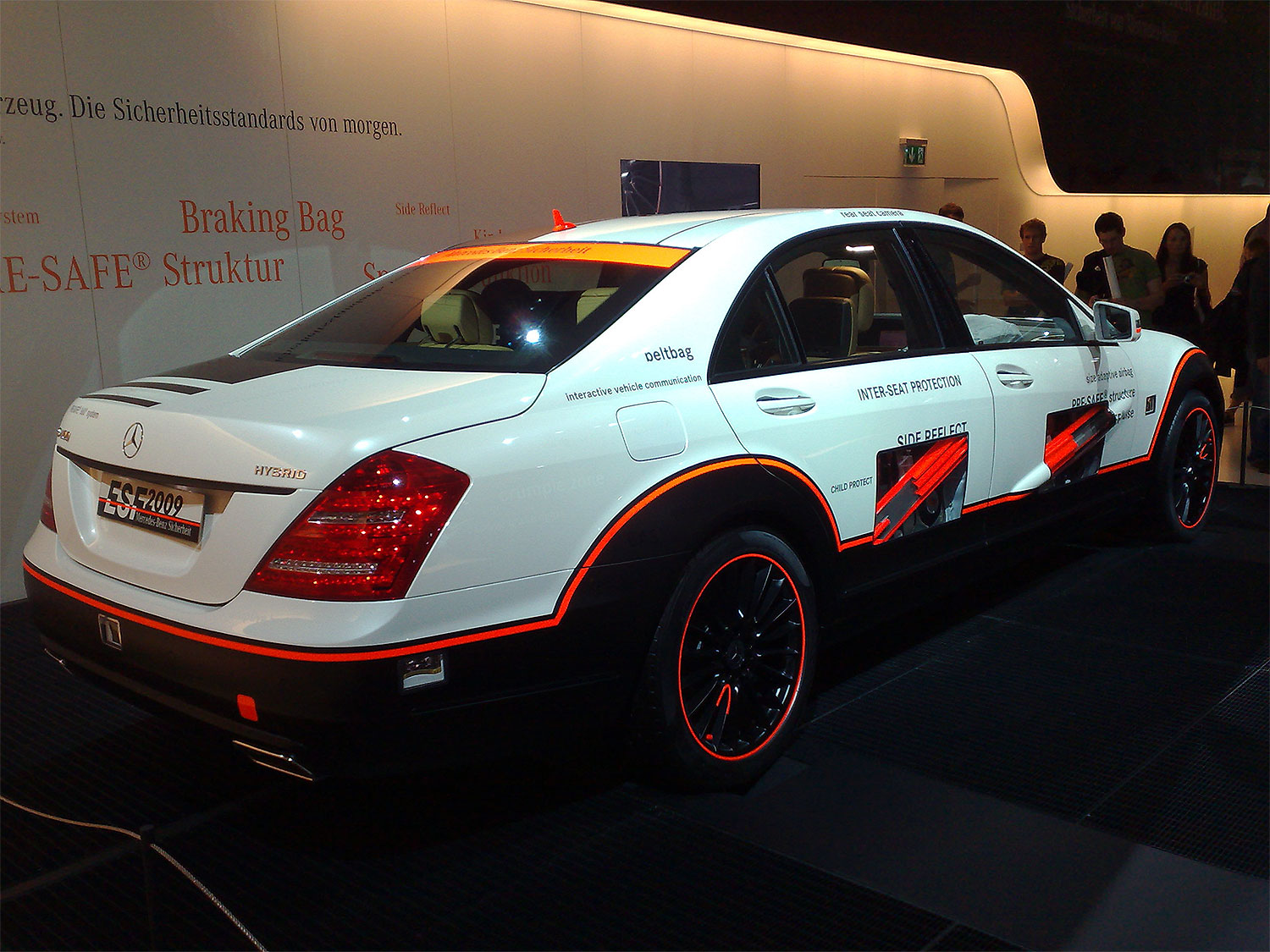
Mercedes-Benz ESF 2009 Experimental Safety Vehicle

- Mercedes-Benz ESF 2009 Experimental Safety Vehicle
- Nissan 216X (1971)
- Pininfarina PF Sigma (1963)
- Pininfarina Sigma (1969), a Ferrari-based Formula One ESV
- Pininfarina Nido (2004), featuring a sled-mounted survival cell with interior crumple zones
- Renault BRV – Basic Research Vehicle – (1974)
- Renault Epure, based on the Renault 5 (1979)
- Sir Vival, (1958), created by Walter C. Jerome
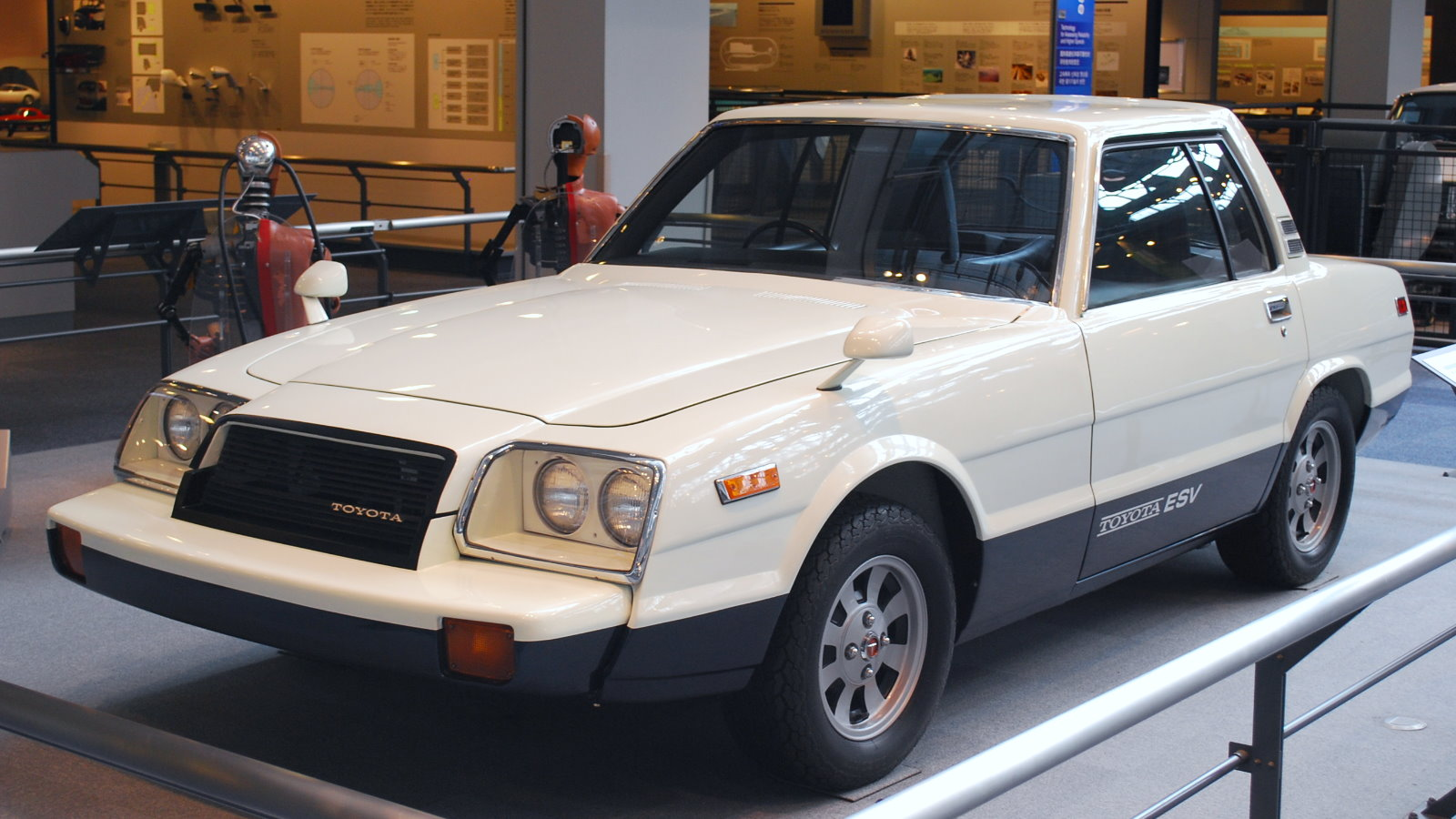
  Toyota ESV (1973)
- Toyota ESV (1972–1973)
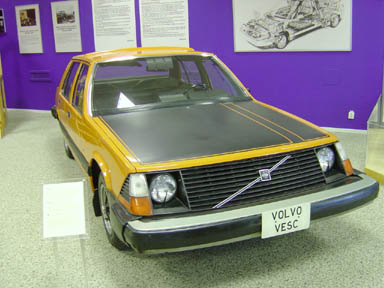
  Volvo VESC (1972)
- Volvo VESC (1972)
- Volvo SCC (2001)
- Volkswagen ESVW1 (1972)
