= Helicron (automobile) =

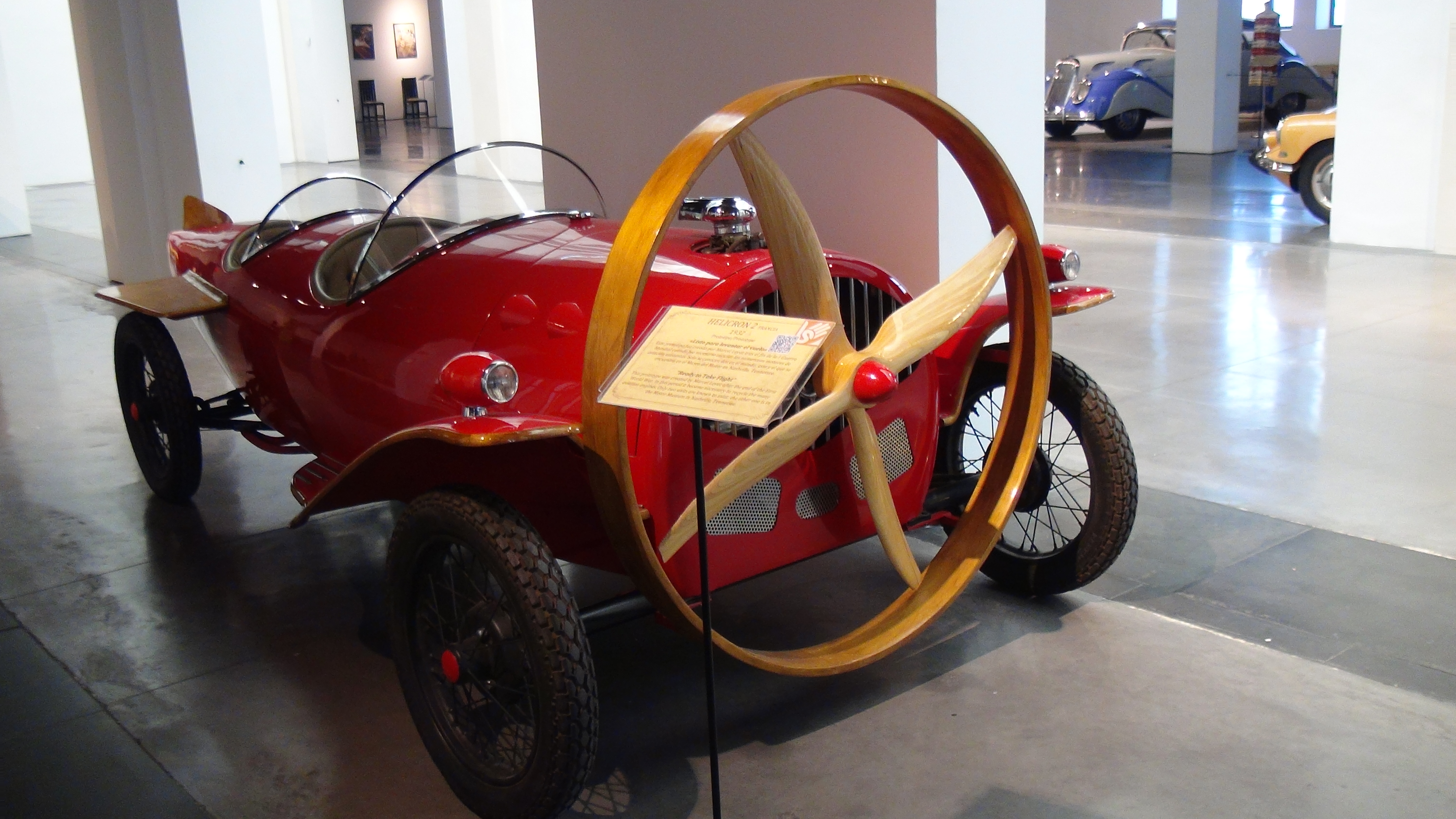

Overview
- Manufacturer: Helicron
- Production: 1932 (one prototype)

Body and chassis
- Class: Propeller car
- Body style: Open-wheel car
- Platform: Rosengart chassis

Powertrain
- Engine: Four-stroke two-cylinder (original engine became lost, used GS flat-4 after barn find)
- Transmission: Non-existent

Dimensions
- Curb weight: 454 kg (1,000 lb)

The Helicron is an open-wheel car that used a propeller as its drive. The Helicron was abandoned in the late 1930s, but was restored after its barn find in 2000. In the same year, the car was permitted by the French government to drive on the French roads.

The car currently resides in the Lane Motor Museum and is on display, as a concept car. It is also possible to find one Helicron in the Automobile and Fashion Museum of Málaga, Spain.

== Restoration ==
The car was found at a barn in 2000, and was sent to restoration, the wood frame was sandblasted and treated to mint condition, the steering gear was rebuilt, and the interior was upholstered. Every part that was damaged were replaced with the same original ones. However, the engine was searched for by the people who found the barn, but were unsuccessful, and ultimately decided to use a Citroën GS flat-four engine as the motor for the propeller.

== Design ==
The car's design was completely distinctive. The car's Rosengart chassis was flipped 180 degrees, which meant significant modifications were required. This also meant the steering was at the rear wheels. The throttle pedal is non-existent, but instead is in the form of a lever, where you have to pull down to increase the RPM of the engine, and pull up to slow the engine. The lever is free, which means the lever can be at any position, and the RPM will be at a certain level. The lever was placed on the left, beside the steering wheel. The emergency brake was placed on the left side, where the sideskirt was. The car still has a brake pedal. The propeller is placed in front of the car.

== Specifications ==
The Helicron uses a 1980-spec Citroën GS flat-four engine to power the front propeller. The amount of horsepower and torque the engine produces is unknown. This engine took the original four-stroke two-cylinder engine's place, as it was lost in the barn the car was placed in. The Helicron also uses no transmission, and only uses a throttle to power the engine.

Because of the simple build, the car weighed only 454 kg (1,001 lb).

With the GS engine, the Helicron is able to do 75 mph (121 km/h).

== Reception ==
Jason Torchinsky of Jalopnik reviewed the car in September 15, 2016, and gave the video title the "car that can mulch pedestrians", referencing the Helicron's large front propeller.

In the good side of things, he mentioned the car was a great way of making complicated vehicle construction much simpler, like having no transmission and just a throttle. Another thing he mentioned was that the propeller helped with decrease in tire wear, and the entire build helped with the mechanical layout. At the opposing spectrum, he mentioned that at any speed you're in, it always feels dangerous, and that hitting pedestrians up front and center with the propeller will kill them. He also mentioned that the experience feels much worse in an urban city.

Torchinsky demonstrated hitting a pedestrian by letting a Jalopnik employee throw sausages towards the propeller. The result was shreds of meat, and a mess of them everywhere on the car and driver. Because of the result, he jokingly said you can eat your food if you were to be a professional thrower.
