= Minicar RSV =

Concept Automobile

The Minicar RSV was a concept automobile created in the United States and funded by the National Highway Traffic Safety Administration (NHTSA) to find ways to decrease highway fatalities. A contract was awarded in 1975 to independent firms Calspan & Minicars, after rejecting unsuitable concepts presented by much larger automakers, including Ford and Volkswagen. The car itself was completed sometime between 1976 & 1980: at least 10 were produced & demonstrated on television & at county fairs. The program was terminated in January 1981, at the start of the Reagan Administration, and most of the test vehicles were destroyed by 1991. In the late 2000s, two vehicles were found, and NHTSA paid to bring one to semi-usable status for further study.

== Specifications ==
- Doors: 2 gull wing doors
- Features: airbags; run-flat tires; did not have seat belts in the front
- Frame: plastic-composite and steel mix
- Mileage: 32 mpg est.
- Powerplant: 1.6-liter Honda EF
- Seating: 4 passengers
