= Lane Motor Museum =

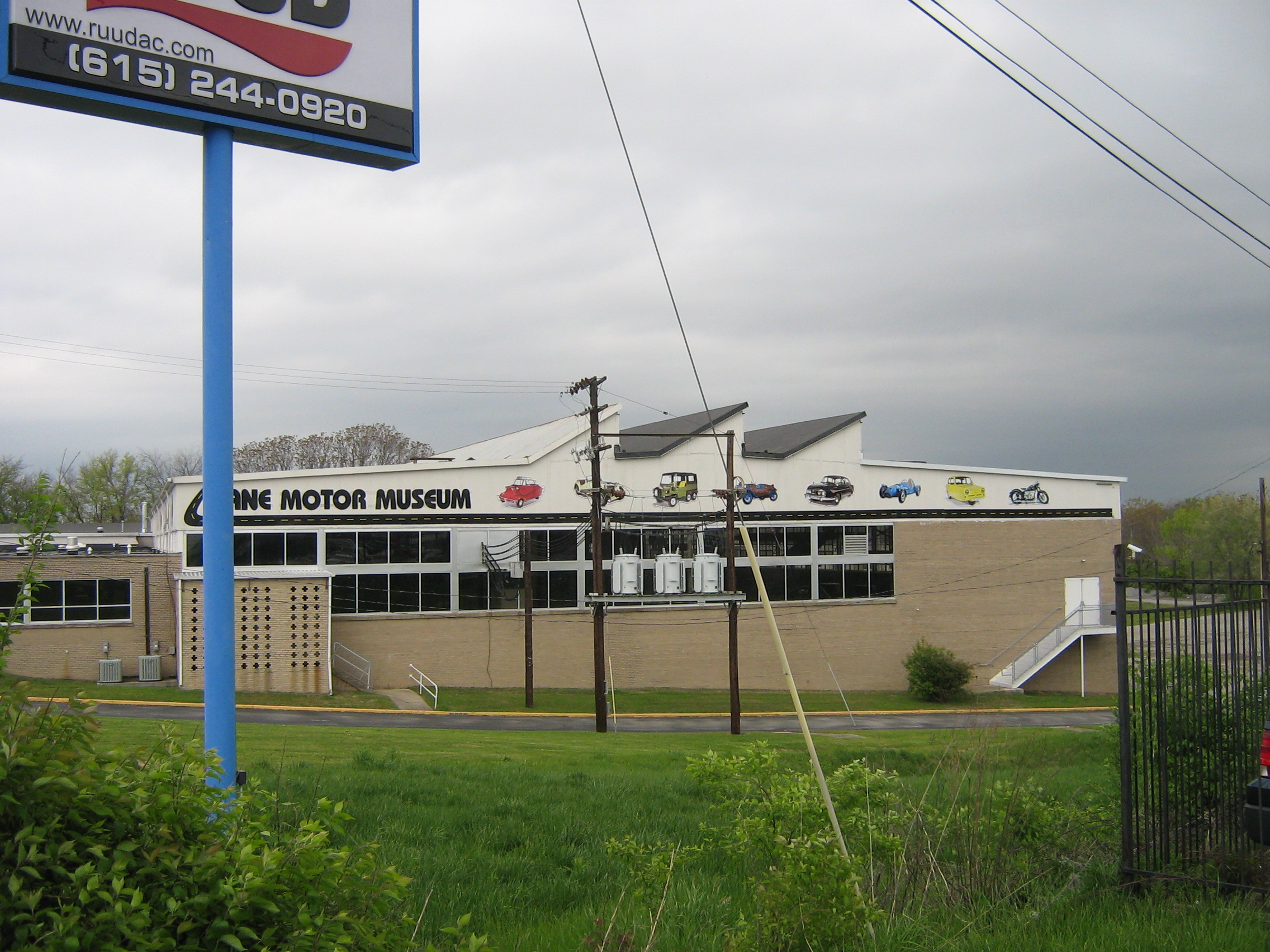
- The Lane Motor Museum

- Location within Tennessee Lane Motor Museum (the United States)
- Established: October 2002; 23 years ago
- Location: Nashville, Tennessee
- Coordinates: 36°8′24.95″N 86°44′3.17″W
- Type: Automobile museum
- Collection size: 500+ automobiles 60+ motorcycles Related art and memorabilia
- Visitors: 60,000 (2024)
- Director: Chris Brewer
- Curator: Chris Hastings
- Public transit access: WeGo Public Transit Route 15
- Website: www.lanemotormuseum.org

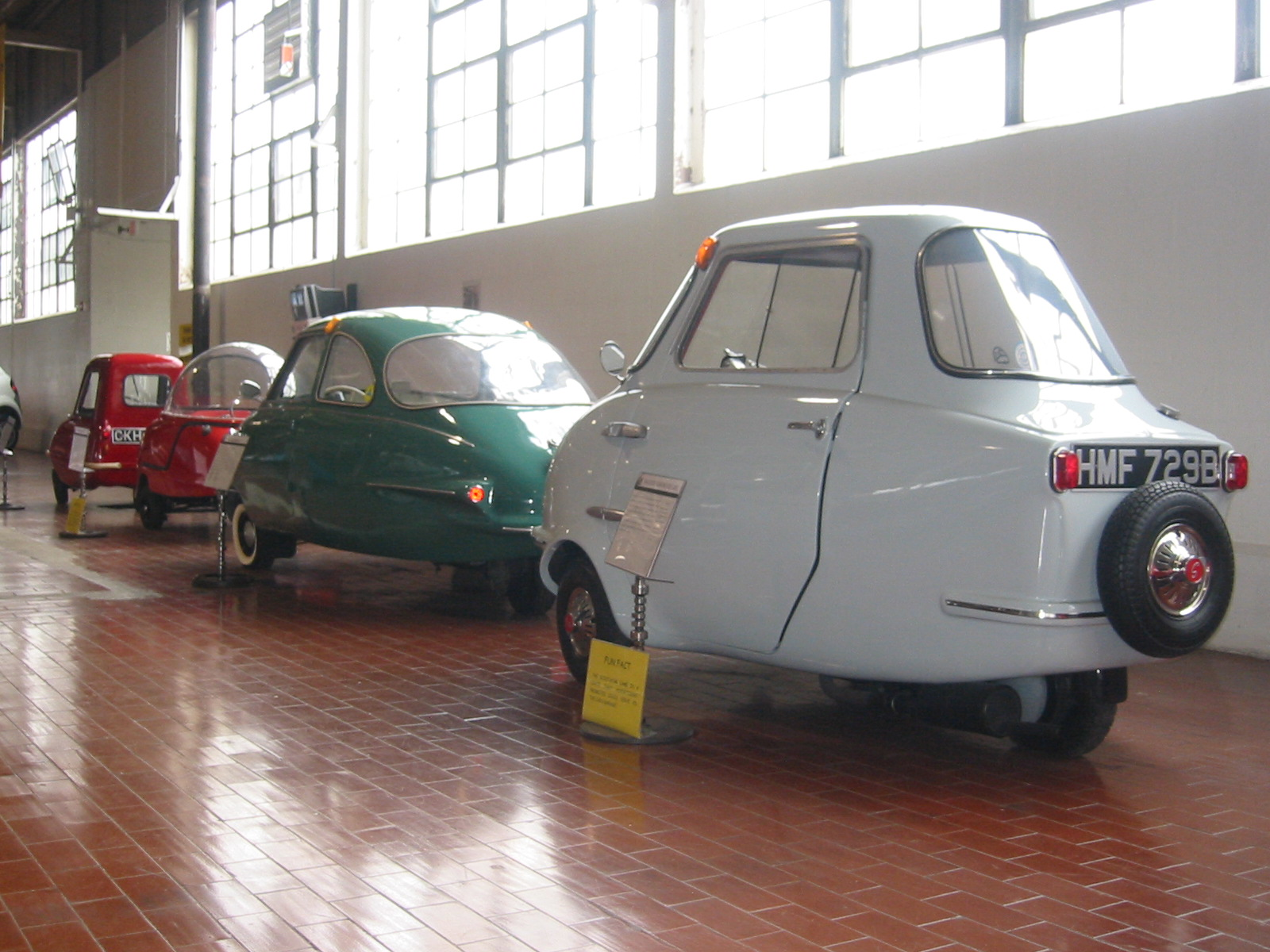
Micro cars on display at the Lane Motor Museum

Lane Motor Museum is an automobile museum in Nashville, Tennessee holding a collection of over 500 mostly European automobiles, with 150 vehicles displayed on any given day.

== Museum ==
The museum was established as a non-profit 501(c)(3) organization in October 2002 by Jeff Lane, beginning with his personal collection of 70–80 vehicles in Nashville's former American Bread Company bakery (1951-1994). The collection also includes automobile art and memorabilia. The museum features European, American, and Asian cars of unusual design, propeller-driven vehicles, microcars, three-wheeled cars, amphibious vehicles, alternative fuel vehicles, military vehicles, competition cars, one-off vehicles, prototypes — and 23 Tatras.

In 2010 the museum began to host an annual fundraiser where donors were able to drive a museum car on a nearby rural route, which continued at least through present day.

When not on display, the rest of the collection is stored in the basement of the building. Tours of the basement storage area (otherwise known as the "Vault") are offered on weekends.

The museum expanded its exhibition space into the renovated garage space in June 2026.
