= SEAT 1430 =

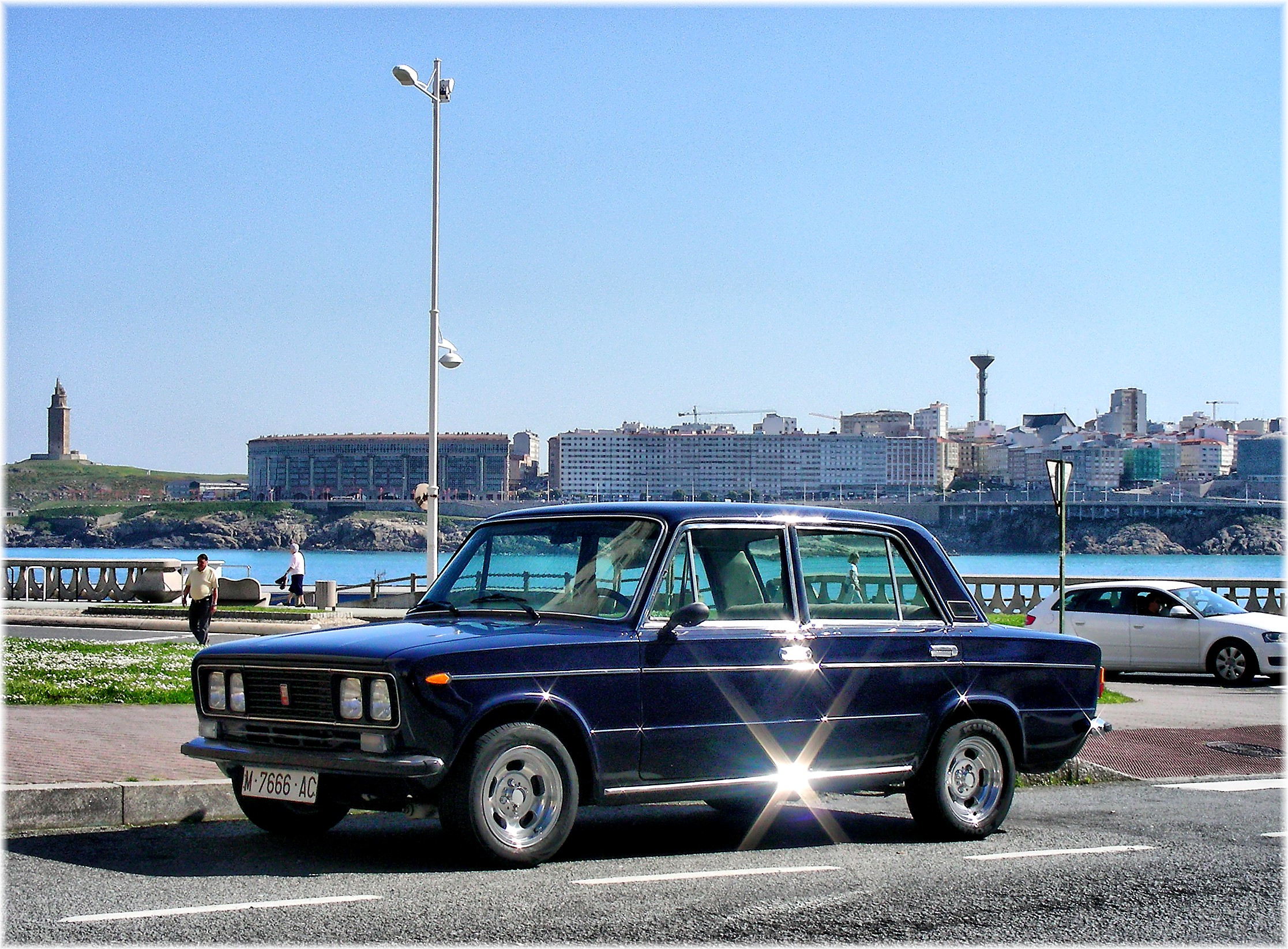
- 1969 SEAT 1430

Overview
- Manufacturer: SEAT
- Production: 1969–1975; 255,414 built
- Assembly: Spain: Barcelona (Zona Franca)

Body and chassis
- Class: Small family car (C)
- Body style: 4-door saloon 5-door estate
- Layout: FR layout
- Related: SEAT 124; Fiat 124 Special; Fiat 125; VAZ-2103; VAZ-2106; VAZ-2107

Powertrain
- Engine: 1438 cc (52 kW); 1592 cc (71 kW); 1756 cc (78 kW)
- Transmission: 5 speed manual

Dimensions
- Wheelbase: 2,420 mm (95 in)
- Length: 4,030 mm (159 in)
- Width: 1,625 mm (64.0 in)
- Curb weight: 855 kg (1,885 lb)

Chronology
- Successor: SEAT 124 D Especial; SEAT 131

The SEAT 1430 is a small family car produced by the Spanish manufacturer SEAT. The model was conceived as a more powerful and luxurious version of the SEAT 124; and was offered in a four-door sedan and five-door station wagon (named Familiar) configuration. The car was based on the Fiat 124 Special, but the front lights were the square ones from the Fiat 125 instead of round.

A total of 255,414 built between 1969 and 1975. It was superseded by the SEAT 131, while the SEAT 124 continued in its base form until 1980.

== Overview ==
The SEAT 1430 was presented at the 1969 Barcelona International Motor Show. It was based entirely on the Special version of the Fiat 124, adapted for the Spanish market by adopting cosmetic elements from the large Fiat 125. For example, the front lights and the cockpit was almost identical to the Italian 125.

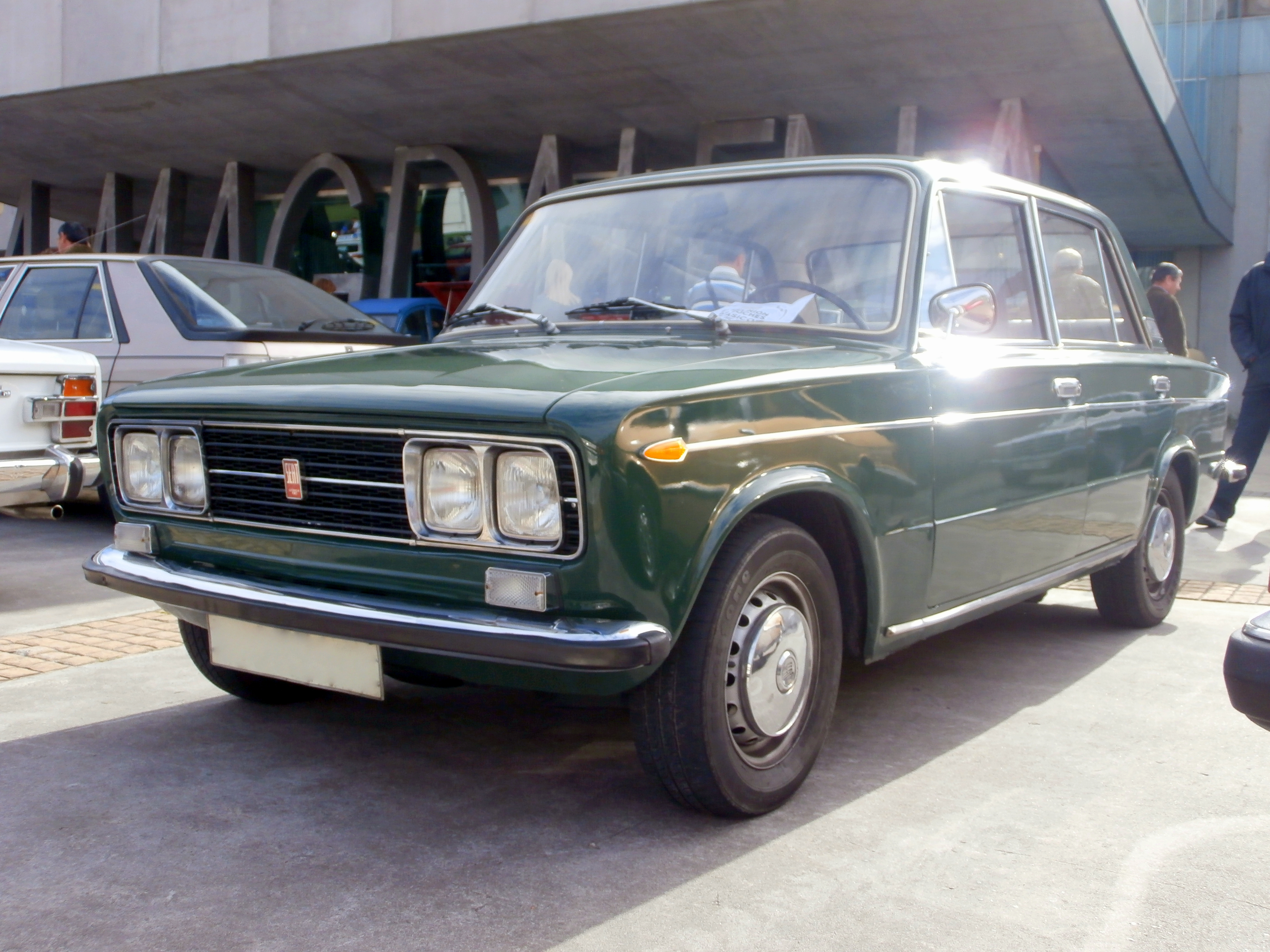
1971 SEAT 1430

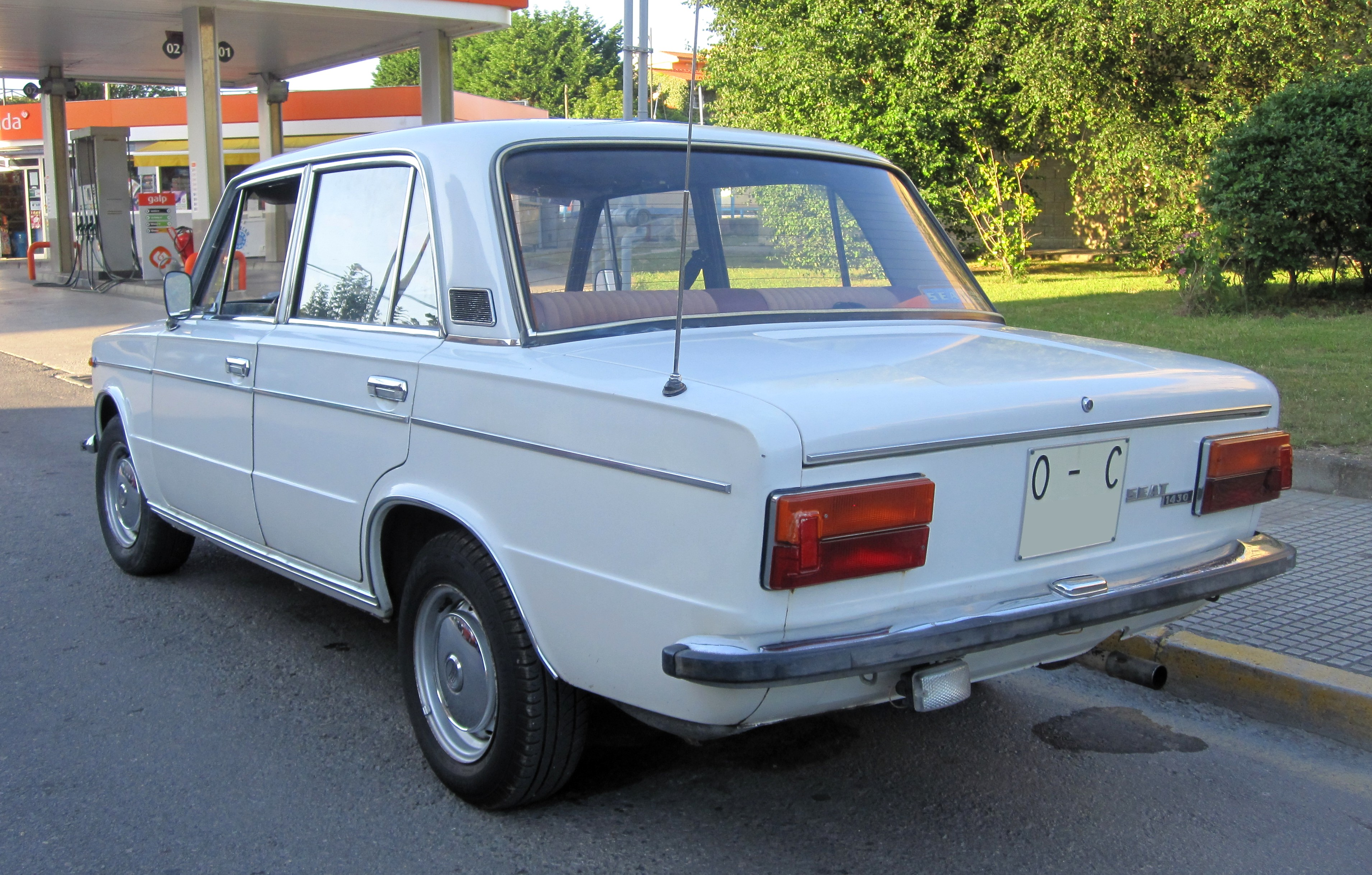
Rear view

In Spain, the 1430 marked the first appearance of a relatively affordable model with very modern features such as a four-link rear suspension, twin-cam engines, and optional five-speed gearboxes, along with a much higher level of equipment compared to the original 124.

The 1430, known popularly as Catorcetreinta (Fourteen-Thirty), was considered in the SEAT line as a distinct model from the 124; positioning itself as an aspirational product within the SEAT range. The combination of finish and performance, particularly in its 1,600cc and 1,800cc "Special" versions, allowed it to enjoy a privileged position for several years among the enthusiasts.

In 1973, the GTI version of the SEAT 1430 was introduced as the 1430 Especial 1600 model, popularly known as "FU".

Unlike its Italian counterpart, where the Fiat 131 was launched in 1974 as a successor of the 124, in Spain the SEAT 131 did not mean the end of the SEAT 124's sales. It remained as a complement to the 131, sharing many mechanical components with it, while the 131 and the more powerful variants of the facelifted 124 (known as the SEAT 124 D Especial) initially took the place of the SEAT 1430, derived from the 124 Special but considered a different - more upmarket - model from the 124 in Spain. The spanish 124 was replaced instead in 1980 by the more modern SEAT Ritmo.

== Motorsport ==
=== Rallying ===
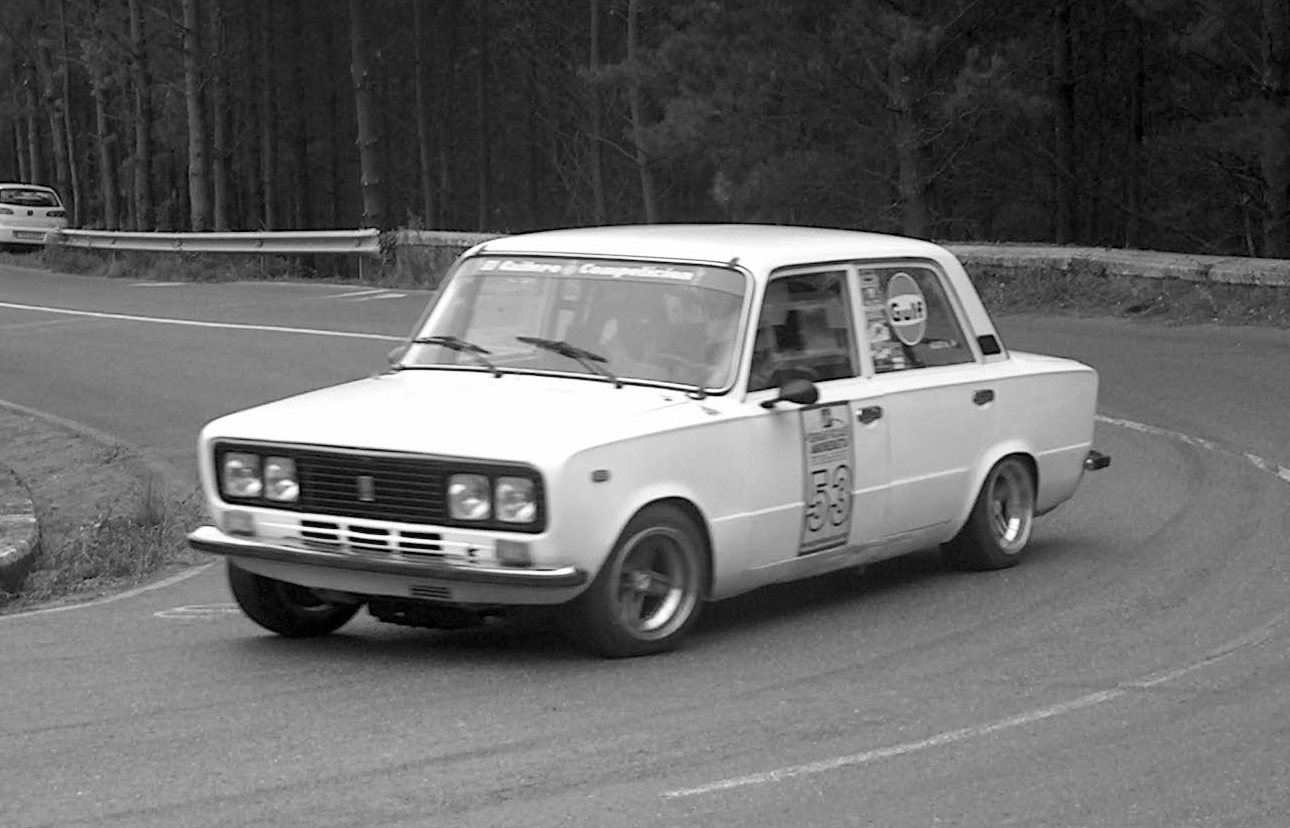
A SEAT 1430 modified for racing

SEAT's first serious attempt at a World Rally Championship (WRC) was in the 1977 season when SEAT took part with its SEAT 1430/124D Especial 1800 race car, and in its debut rallying event at the Montecarlo Rally, the SEAT team finished in the third and fourth places with the official 1430-1800 cars being driven by Antonio Zanini and Salvador Cañellas.

=== Formula ===
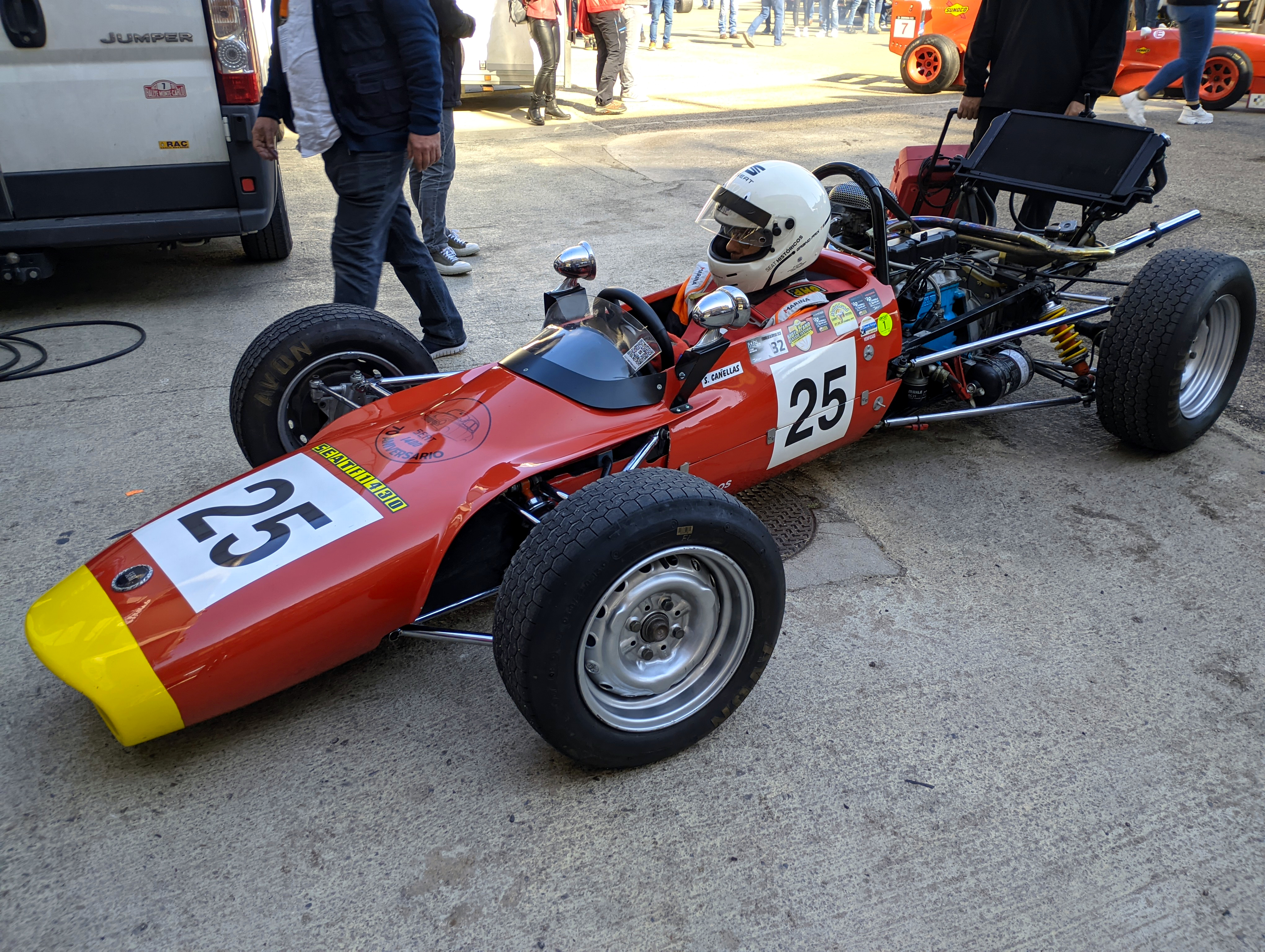
Salvador Cañellas driving a SEAT Formula 1430

In 1970 SEAT set up the 'Fórmula Nacional' series in Spain, a year later to be known as Formula 1430. The single-seater formula cars, which took part driven by young Spanish drivers, were equipped under support from SEAT with engines of the 1430 model and 6700 gearboxes. The first race of the 'Fórmula Nacional' series took place at the Jarama circuit in Madrid.

== Related models ==
=== SEAT 1430 Sport Coupé ===
In 1977, the SEAT 1200 Sport was introduced as the SEAT 1430 Sport Coupé, using the same body of the 1200 Sport, but with a retuned version of the engine from the SEAT 1430. In this application, the 1,438-cc engine provided a power output of 77 PS (57 kW) and a top speed of 164 km/h (102 mph).

=== Auto Replica MG 50 ===
The SEAT 1430 also provided the engine and other underpinnings for the "Auto Replica MG 50", a Spanish-made replica of the MG TD.
