= SEAT 124 =

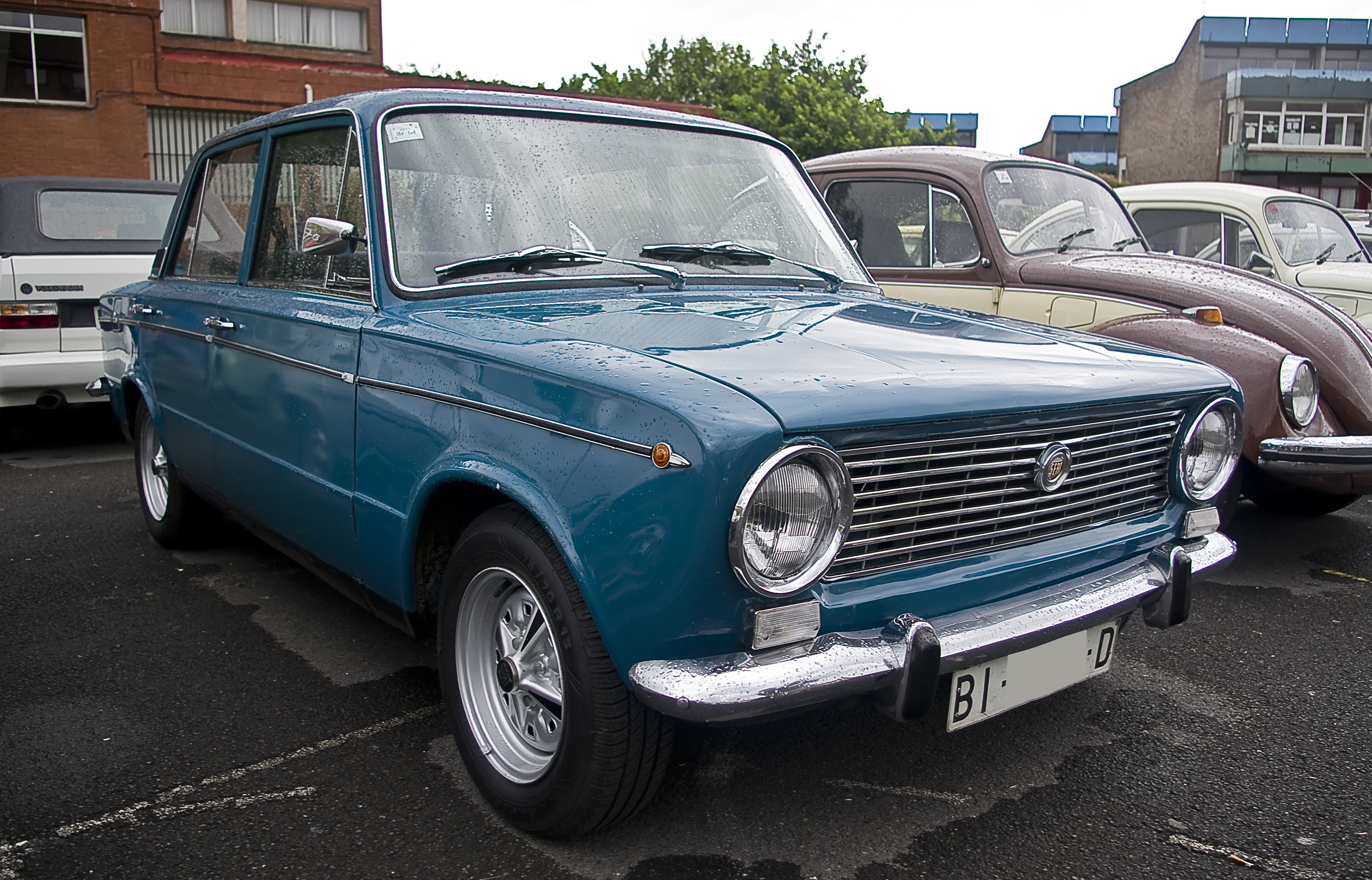
- 1973 SEAT 124 D (first series)

Overview
- Manufacturer: SEAT
- Production: 1968–1980; 896,136 built
- Assembly: Spain: Zona Franca, Barcelona (1968–1975); Spain: Pamplona, Navarra (1976–1980)
- Designer: Oscar Montabone (sedan); Mario Boano (sport coupe); Giorgetto Giugiaro (1975 facelift)

Body and chassis
- Class: Small family car (C)
- Body style: 2-door coupé 4-door saloon 5-door estate
- Layout: FR layout
- Related: SEAT 1430; Fiat 124; VAZ-2101 (Lada 1200); VAZ-2105 (Lada Riva); Tofaş Murat 124; Premier 118NE

Dimensions
- Wheelbase: 242 cm (95.3 in)
- Length: 404 cm (159.1 in)
- Width: 162.5 cm (64.0 in)
- Height: 142 cm (55.9 in)

Chronology
- Successor: SEAT Ritmo

The SEAT 124 is a small family car produced by the Spanish manufacturer SEAT in its Zona Franca, Barcelona and Landaben, Pamplona plants between 1968 and 1980. The SEAT 124 was produced in four-door, five-door station wagon (Familiar) and two-door coupé (Sport) versions under various engines and trim levels; including a special, more powerful variant, called SEAT 1430.

The car was very successful in Spain having sold 896,136 units.

== History ==
=== First series (1968–1974) ===
Due to the social and economic development that took place in Spain during the 1960s, SEAT decided to manufacture under license a local version of the Fiat 124 presented in 1966. Aimed at the middle class, the objective was to fill the gap in the range between both SEAT 600 and 850 city cars, and the large 1500 sedan. The 124 represented a great step forward for the automotive era in Spain when it was introduced.

The range consisted of the SEAT 124 four-door sedan and five-door station wagon (named Familiar), equivalent to the standard Italian model, and the SEAT 1430, identical to the Fiat 124 "special" except for some styling details borrowed from the large Fiat 125, the last one equipped with the more powerful engines. Like its Italian counterpart, the 124 was only available with the basic 1,197cc engine, a water-cooled, five-bearing, inline four-cylinder fed by a two-barrel carburetor and coupled to a four-speed gearbox. Initially, it produced a maximum power of 60 hp (DIN), but in 1973, with the introduction of the SEAT 124 LS, a 65 hp (DIN) variant was offered. The equipment and presentation varied throughout production, with numerous elements taken from the Seat 1430 and the Italians Fiat 124 Special and 125 that made it different from the original Fiat 124.

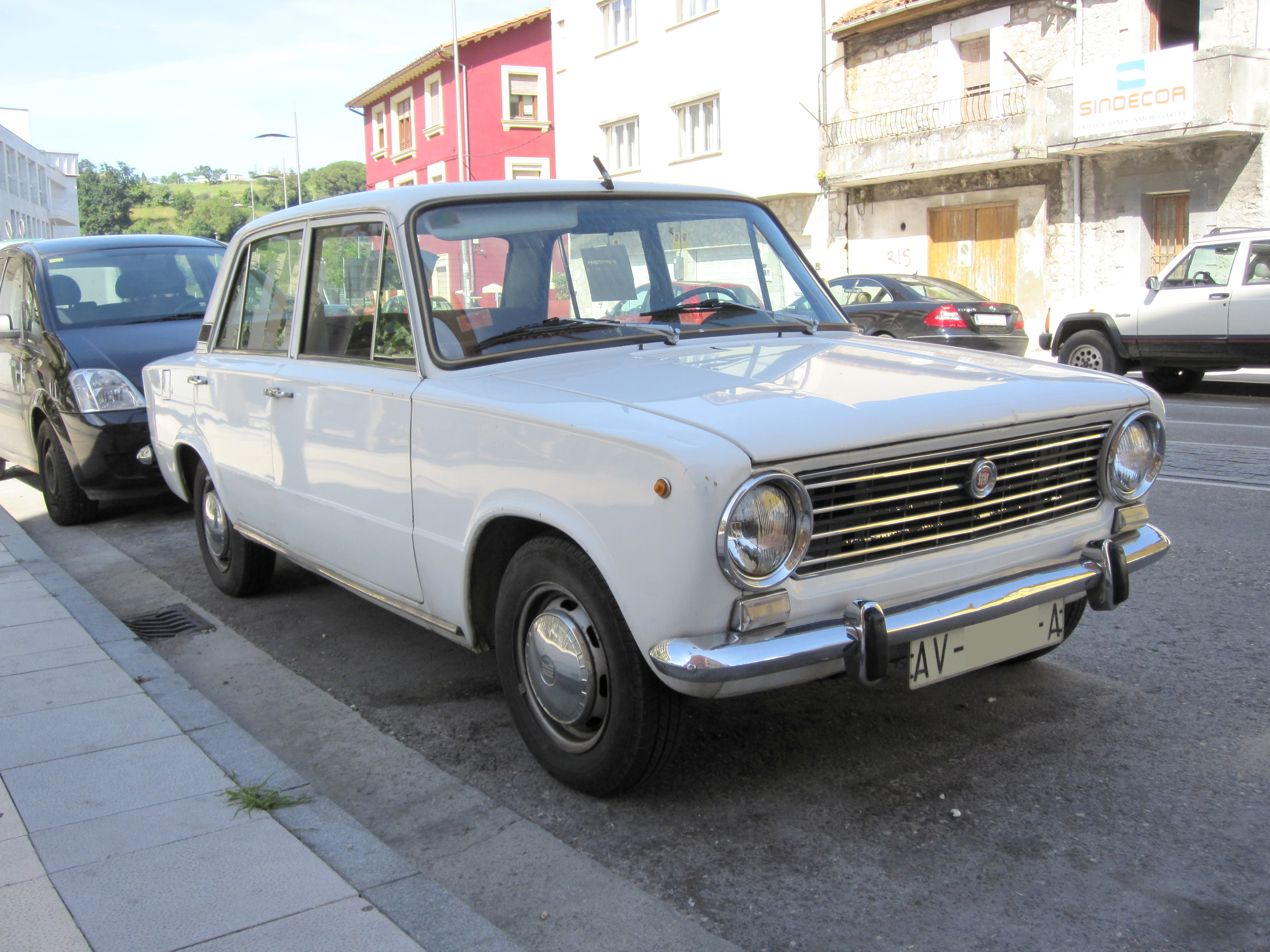
1975 SEAT 124 D

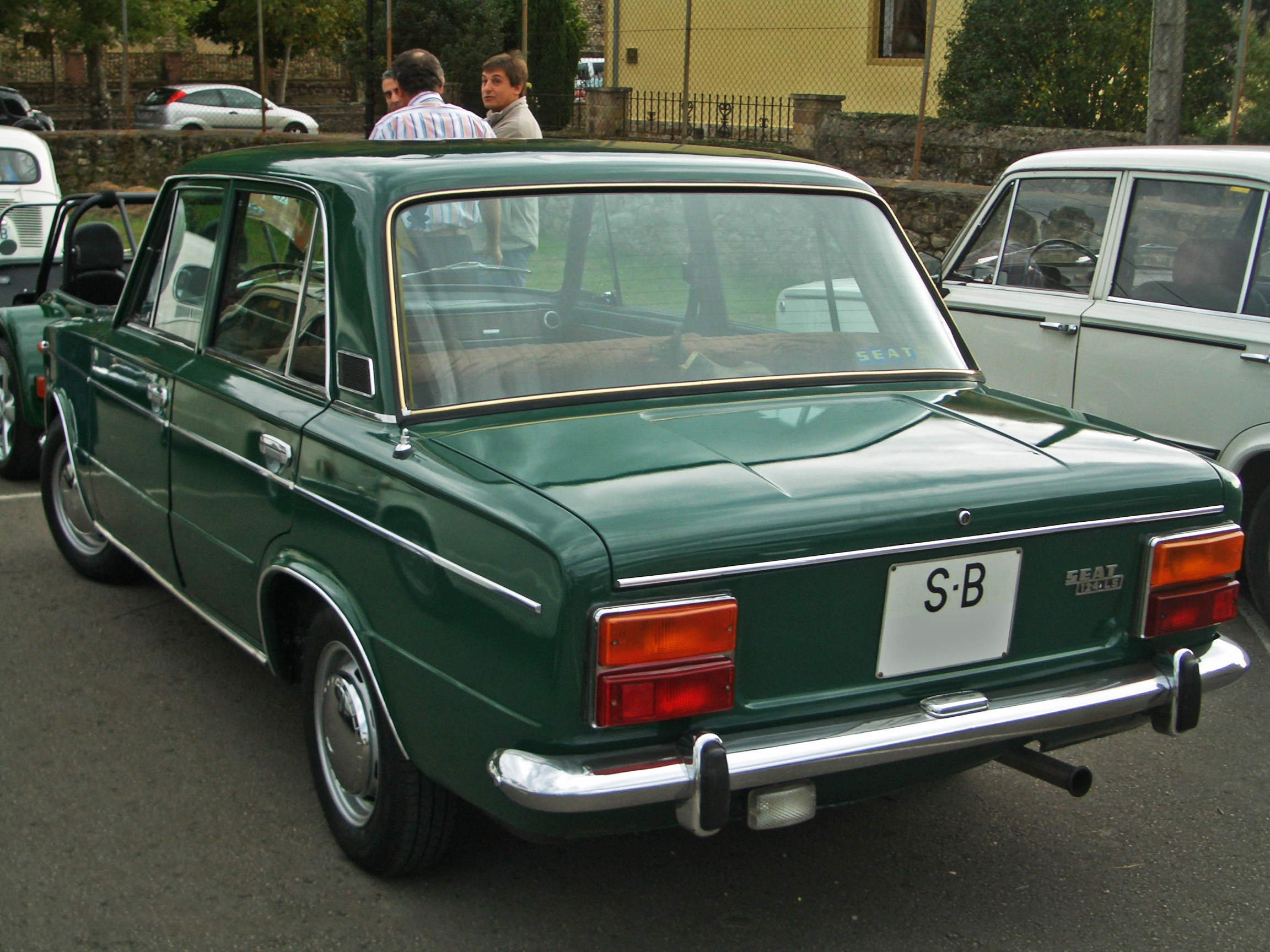
Rear view

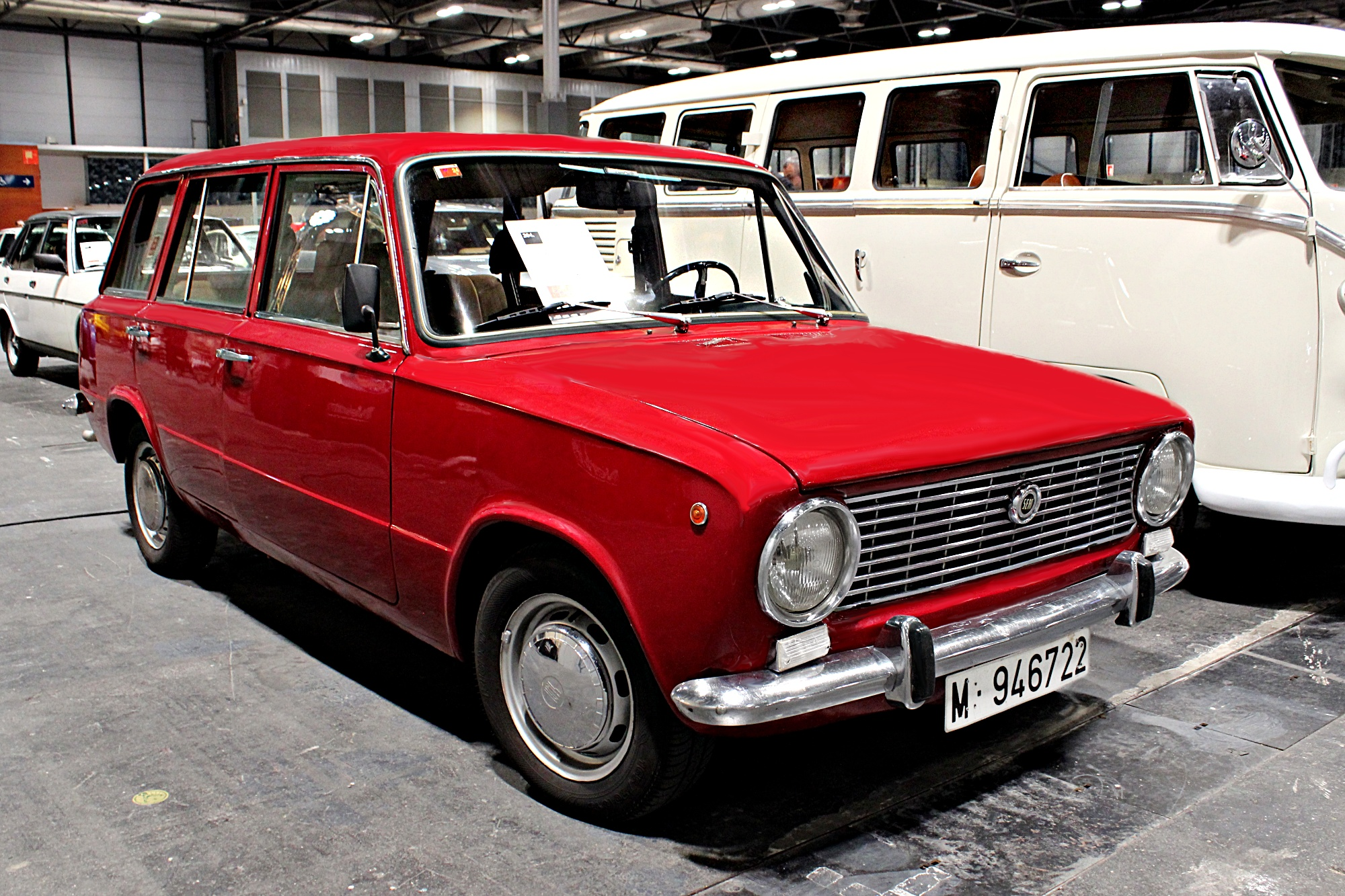
1971 SEAT 124 D Familiar

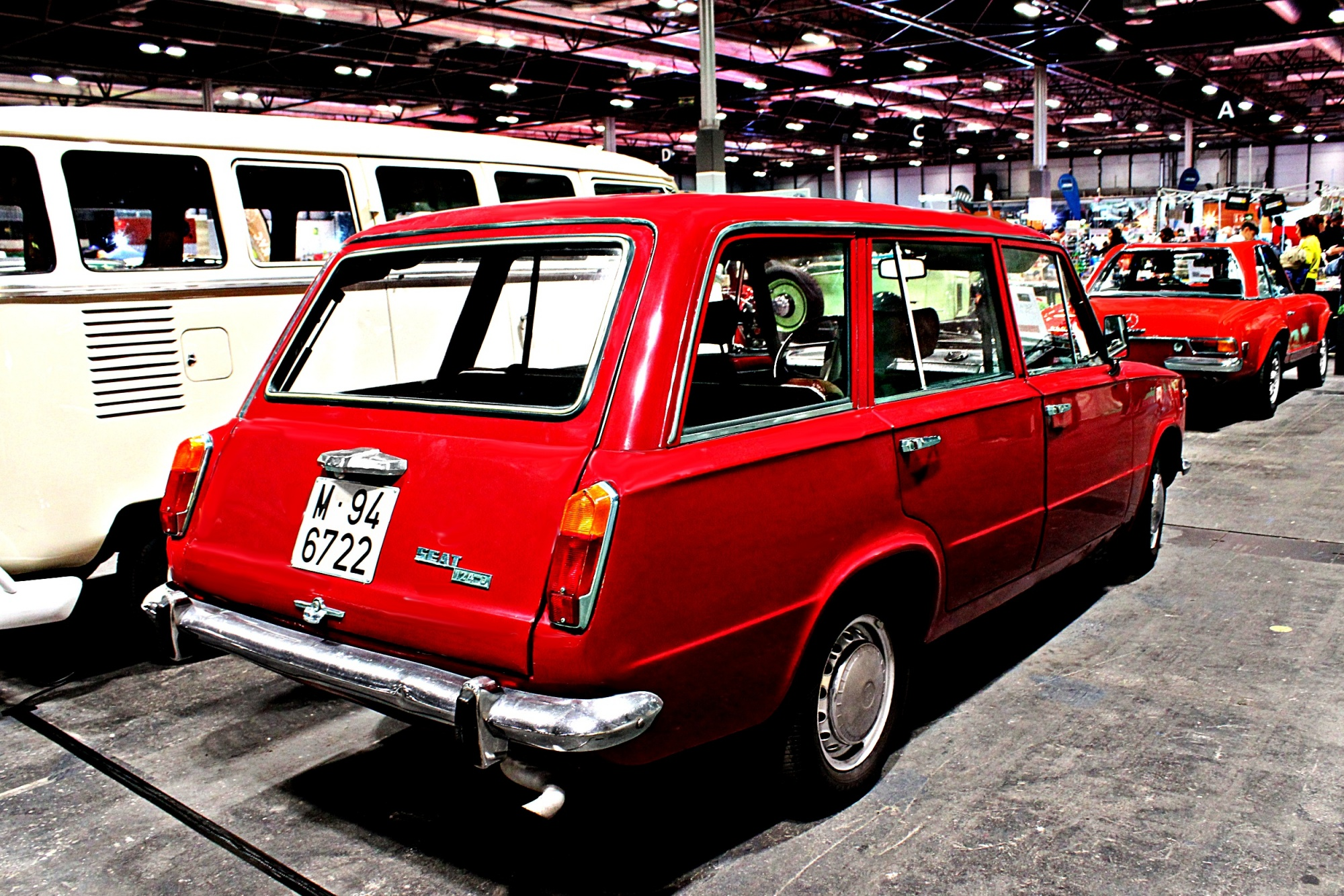
Rear view

=== Second series (1975–1980) ===
In 1975 the model underwent a facelift by Giorgetto Giugiaro; the circular front headlights were replaced by rectangular ones and its rear was altered amid several modifications, while the SEAT 124 and SEAT 1430 ranges were unified under a single model officially named SEAT 124D versión 75. In 1976 production of the car was transferred from the Zona Franca to the Landaben plant in Pamplona, newly acquired from Authi, resulting in the elimination of the '124 Familiar' five-door station wagon versions.

The four-cylinder twin-barrel carburetted 1197 cc motor originally delivered 60 CV (DIN), however in 1973 a new derivative was implemented with the introduction of the SEAT 124 LS which offered 65 CV (DIN).

The variants equipped with the Twin Cam motor, victorious for decades in all-type competition, were generally known as FL which had been the internal code name used by the brand.

Its engine soon became famous for its nerve and offered high performance in many circumstances: either as a taxi cab, a police car, an ambulance, a hearse, or even a fire truck. As a race car, it won numerous competitions and trophies driven by pilots like Salvador Cañellas and Antonio Zanini amid others. Modified for this purpose in order to be used in rallies, its engine displacement was raised to reach as much as 2090 cc. In the 1977 Monte Carlo Rally, where Zanini finished third, the 124s were fitted with the same 1.8-liter 16-valve engine as the Fiat 131 Abarths.

More Sport versions were made with 1600 cc (1970–72), 1800 cc (1972–75) and 2000 cc (1978–79).

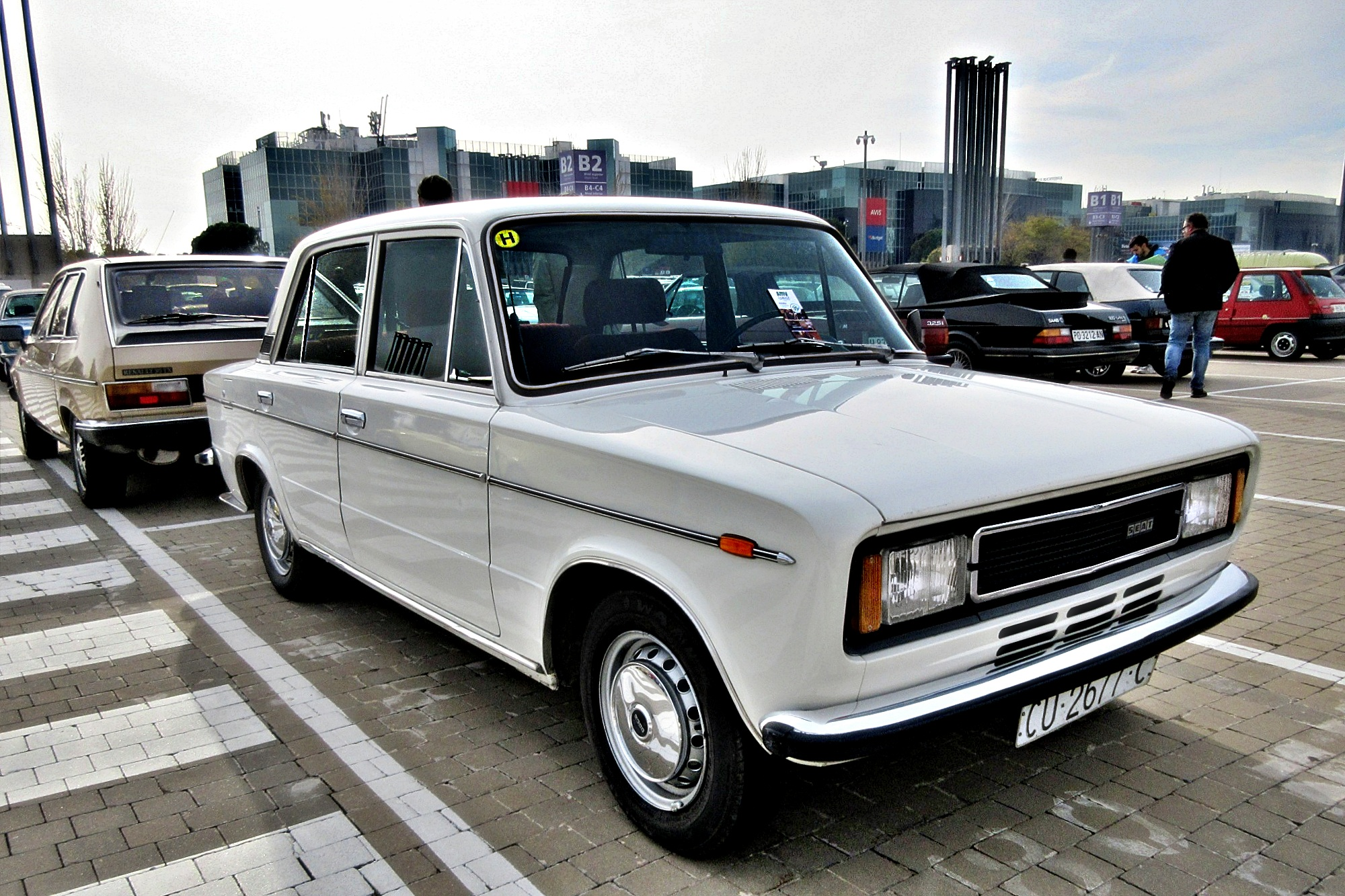
1980 SEAT 124 D especial (facelift)

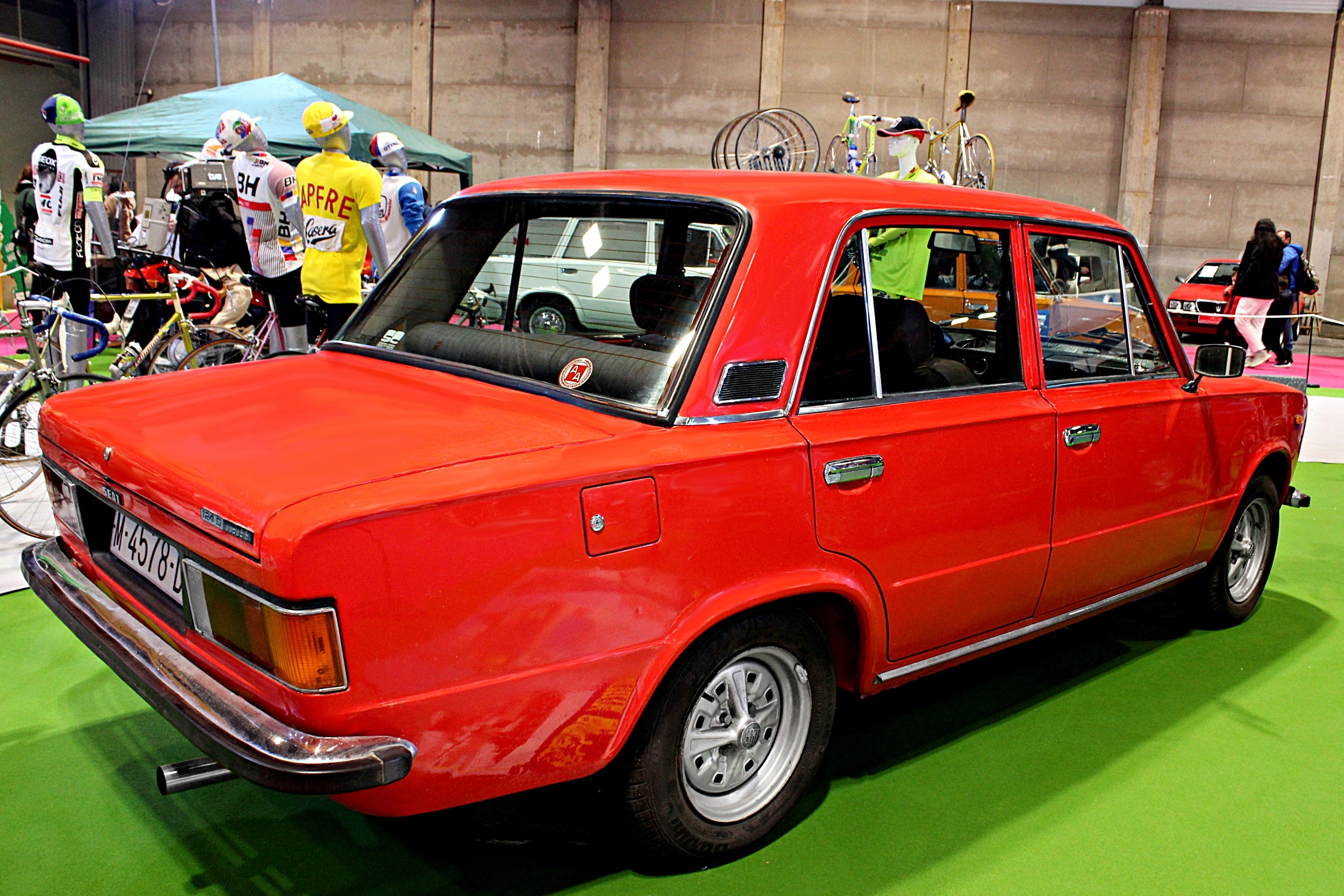
Rear view

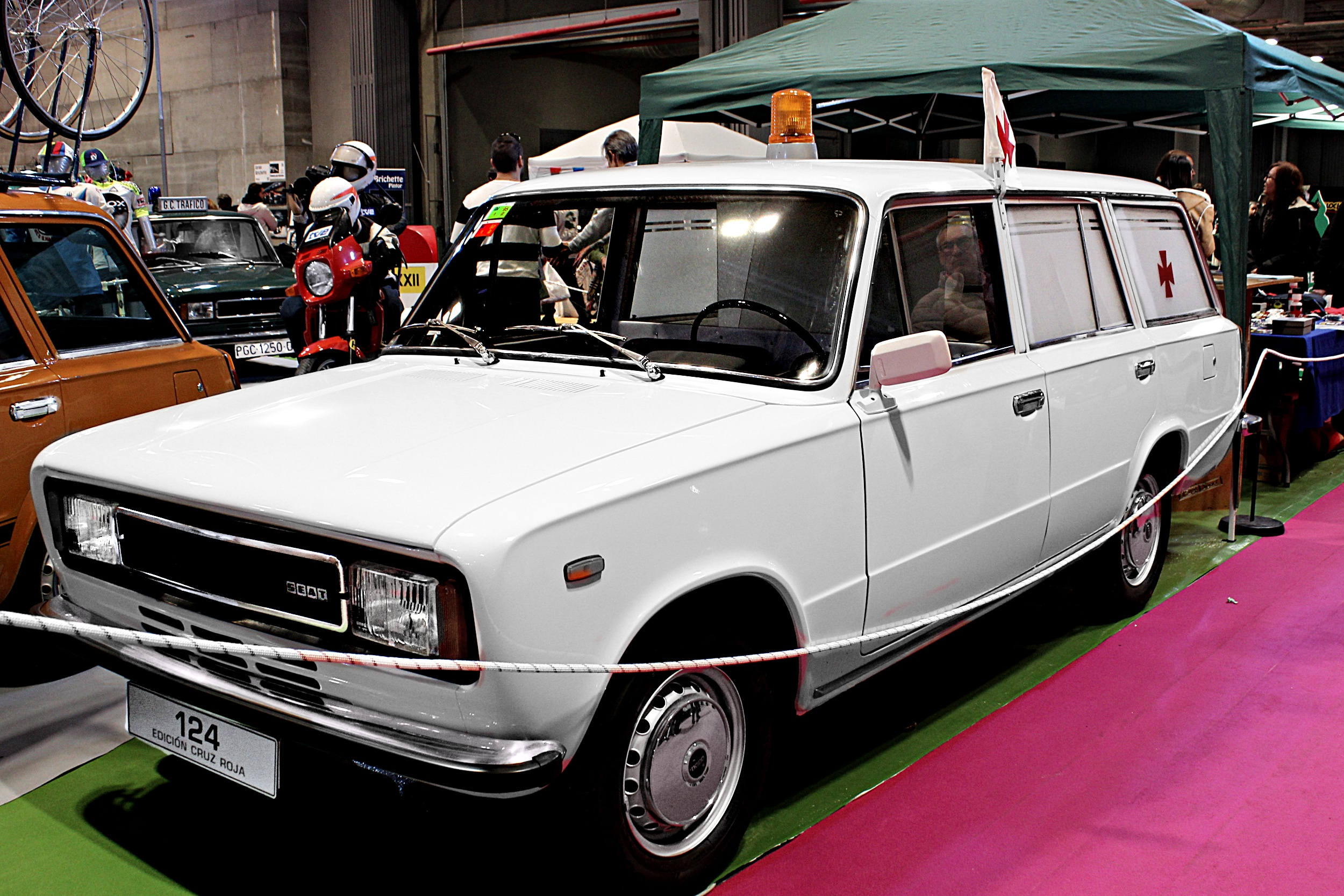
SEAT 124 Familiar (facelift)

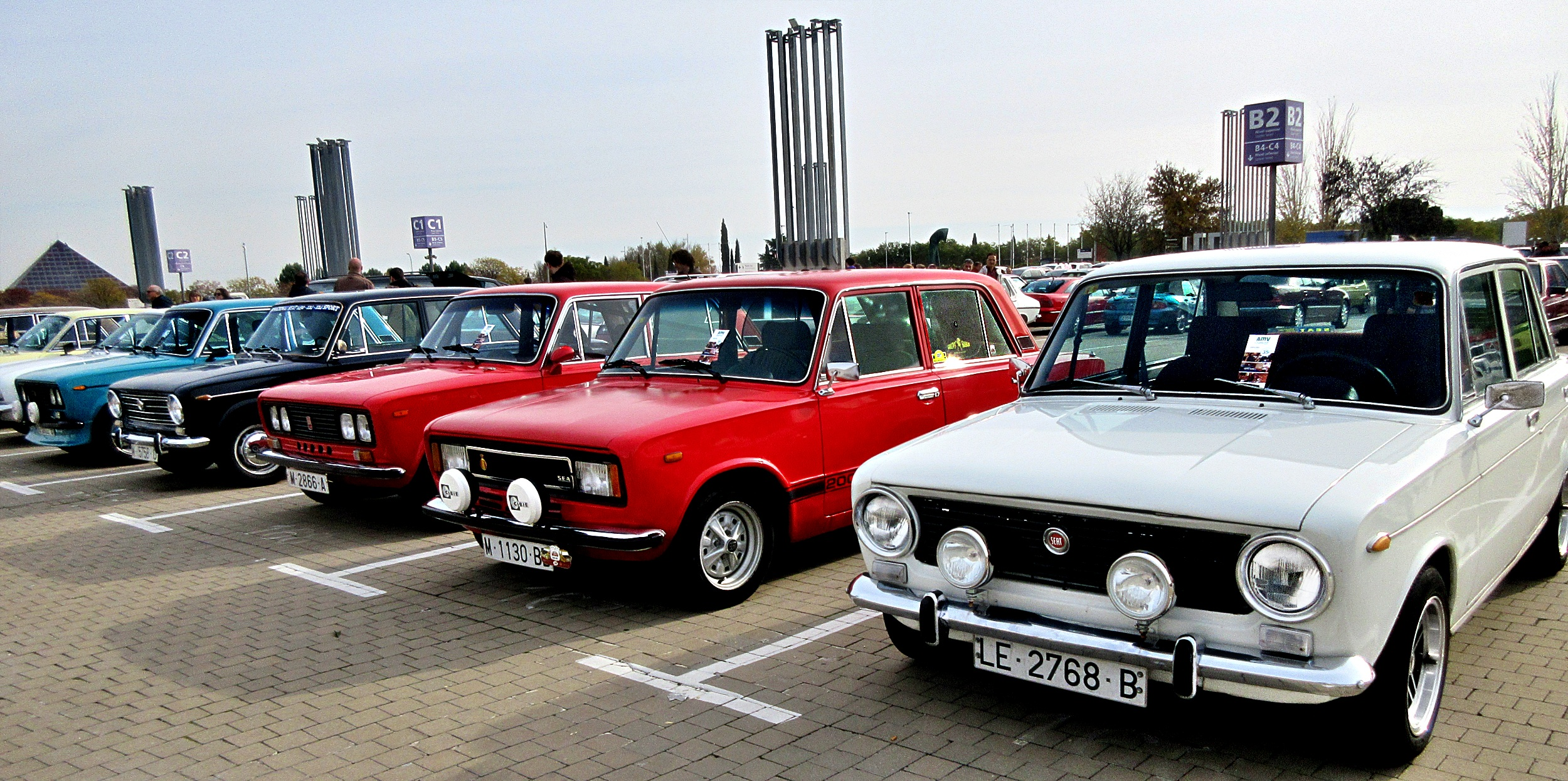
(From left to right) SEAT 1430, SEAT 124 second series & SEAT 124 first series

Unlike its Italian counterpart, where the Fiat 131 was launched in 1974 as a successor of the 124, in Spain the SEAT 131 did not mean the end of the SEAT 124's sales. It remained as a complement to the 131, sharing many mechanical components with it, while the 131 initially took the place of the SEAT 1430, derived from the 124 Special but considered a different - more upmarket - model from the 124 in Spain. The spanish 124 was replaced by the more modern SEAT Ritmo in 1980, however.

== Versions ==
- 1: SEAT 124 (FA) — 1968–1971
- 2: SEAT 124 Lujo (FB) and SEAT 124 L (FB-02) — 1968–1971
- 3: SEAT 124 D (FA-03) — 1971–1975
- 4: SEAT 124 D Lujo (FB-03) — 1971–1973
- 5: SEAT 124 LS (FB-05) — 1973–1974
- 6: SEAT 124 D "Extras" (FB-11) — 1974–1975
- 7: SEAT 124 D Versión ´75 (FL-00) — 1975–1980
- 8: SEAT 124 D Versión ´75 LS (FL-03...) — 1975–1980
- 9: SEAT 124 D Versión ´75 Especial 1430 ( FL-10/11/12) — 1975–1980
- 10: SEAT 124 D Versión ´75 Especial 1600 (FL-40/45) — 1976–1979
- 11: SEAT 124 D Versión ´75 Especial 1800 (FL-80/82) — 1976–1978
- 12: SEAT 124 D Versión ´75 Especial 2000 (FL-90) — 1978–1979
- 13: SEAT 124 5p (FJ) / SEAT 124 D 5p (FJ-02) / SEAT 124 D Versión ´75 5p (FN) — 1969–1976

== Motorsport ==
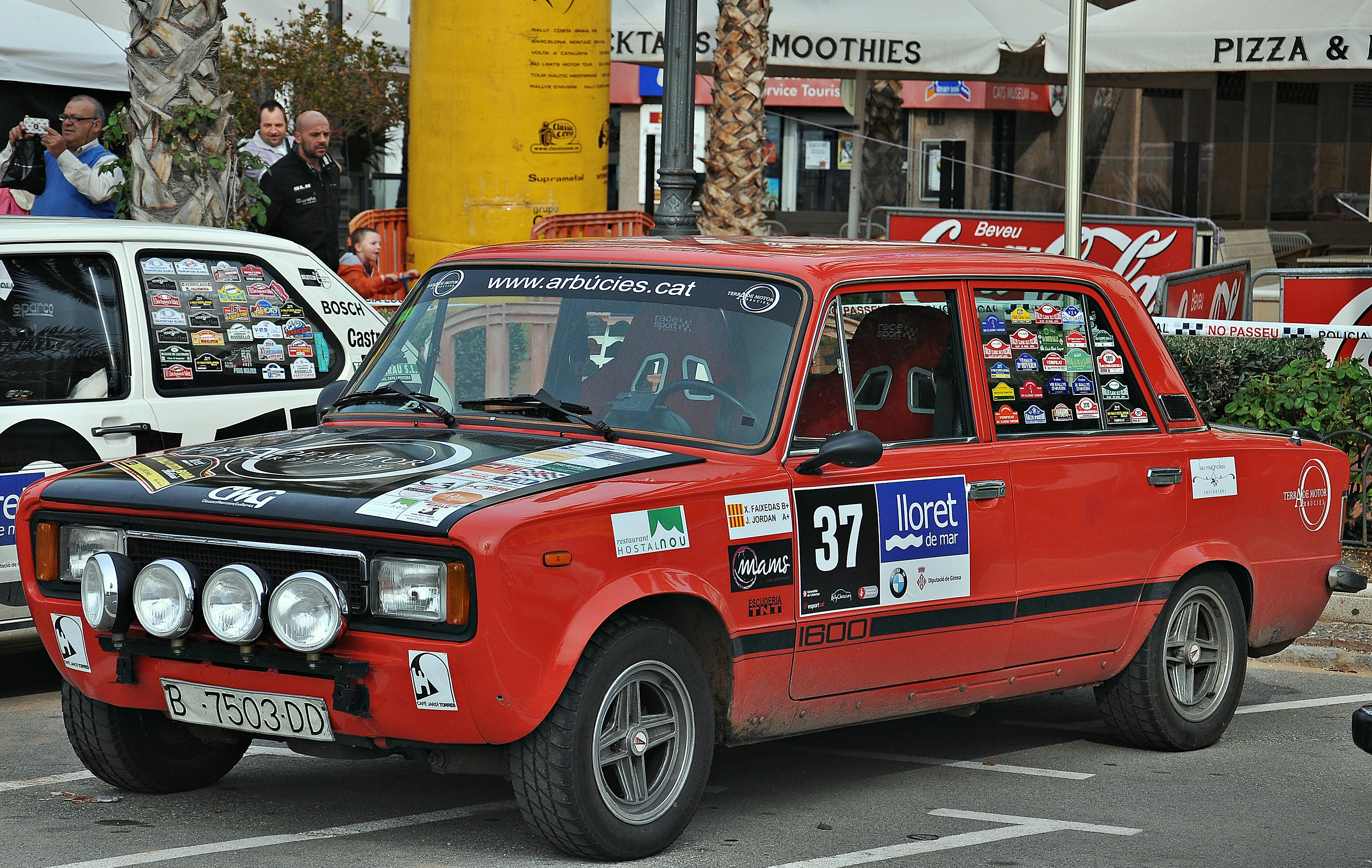
A SEAT 124 D modified for rally

SEAT's first serious attempt at a World Rally Championship (WRC) was in the 1977 season when SEAT took part with its SEAT 1430/124D Especial 1800 race car, and in its debut rallying event at the Montecarlo Rally, the SEAT team finished in the third and fourth places with the official 1430-1800 cars being driven by Antonio Zanini and Salvador Cañellas.

== License production ==
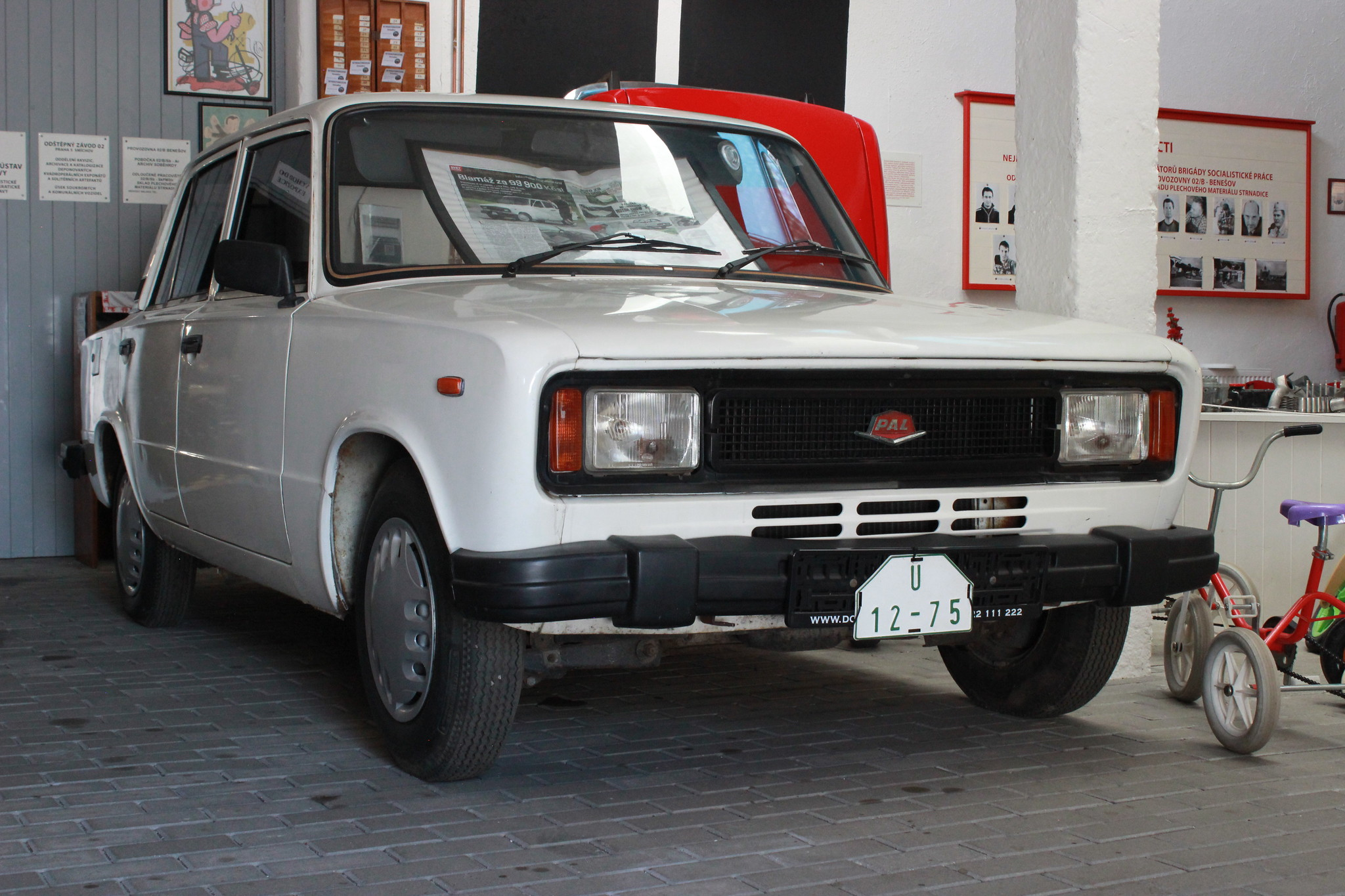
Premier 118NE

A license version of the facelifted SEAT 124 D was produced in India between 1985 and 2001 by Premier Automobiles Limited as the Premier 118NE. However, Premier incorporated the Nissan A12 (1,171 cc and 52 bhp) powertrain instead of the original Fiat engine along with a Nissan manual gearbox.

== Related models ==
=== SEAT 124 Sport Coupé ===
SEAT also built its own version of the 124 coupe named as the SEAT 124 Sport Coupé. The SEAT derivative was presented for the first time at the 1970 Barcelona Motor Show and it was built in Spain under license from Fiat. Identical to the Fiat 124 Sport Coupé second (1600) and third series (1800), it was launched in order to meet the rising local market demand for sports cars next to offerings coming not only from other car makers – like the Authi Mini C 1275, the Alpine A110, the Renault 8TS and the Simca 1000 Rallye GT – but also SEAT itself with the SEAT 850 Sport Coupé and Spider models.

Power was provided by double camshaft (biárbol) engines, with a displacement of either 1,608 cc (1600, FC-00) or 1,756 cc (1800, FC-02). Both engine variants were linked to a 5-speed gearbox, a transmission introduced for the first time in a model on the Spanish market. The first series produced from 1970 to 1973 was equivalent to the BC series of Fiat's version, and used 1608 cc engines provided by Fiat itself. The second series from 1973 onwards was a direct copy of the CC model, offered only with the larger, less stressed 1756 cc engine.

A total of 23,611 units of the 124 Sport were built between 1970 and 1974. At the 1972 Barcelona show, Catalan coachbuilder Pedro Serra presented a Cabriolet version of the 124 Sport; a handful were built.

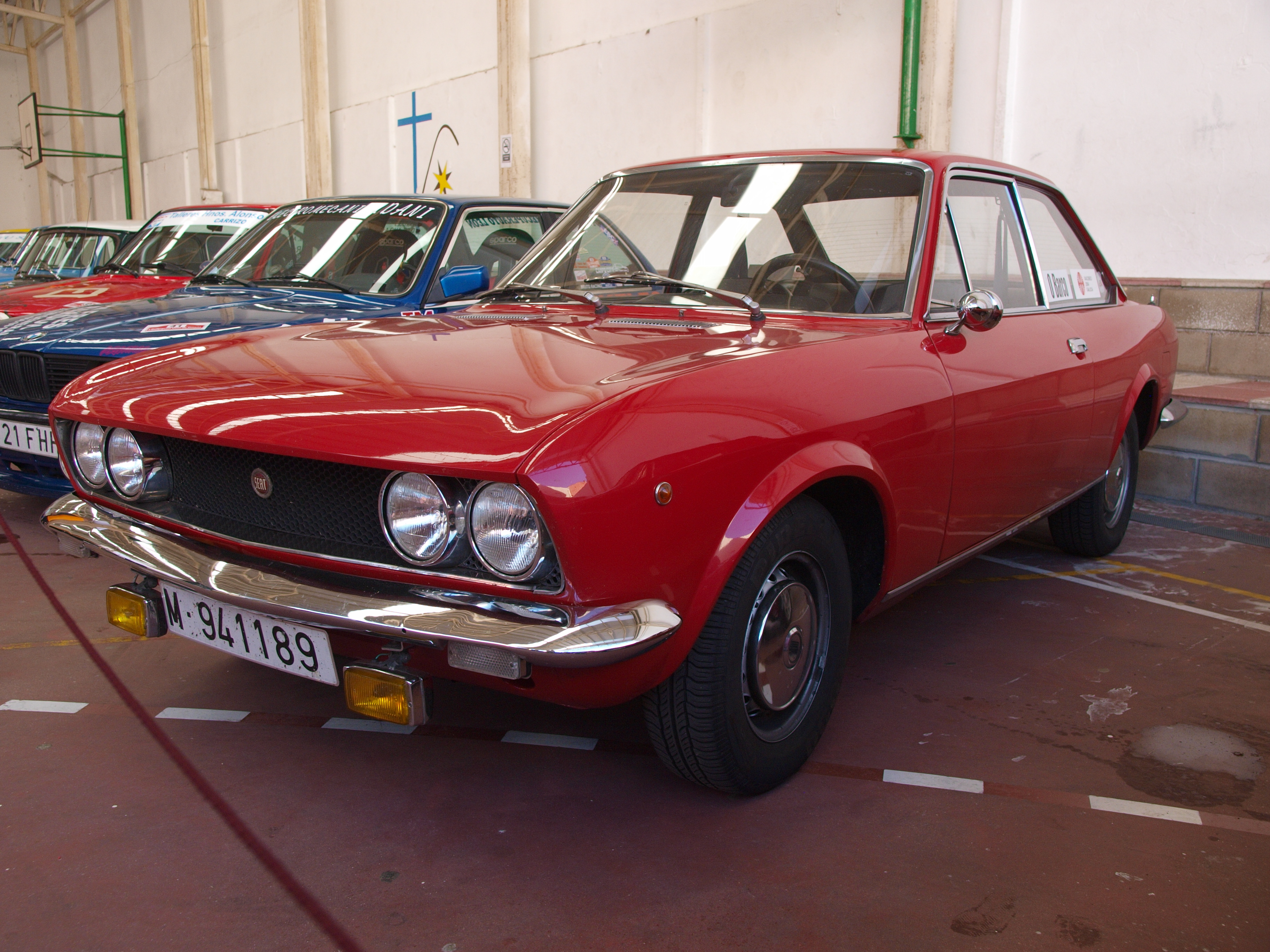
1971 Seat 124 Sport SC 1600 (pre-facelift)

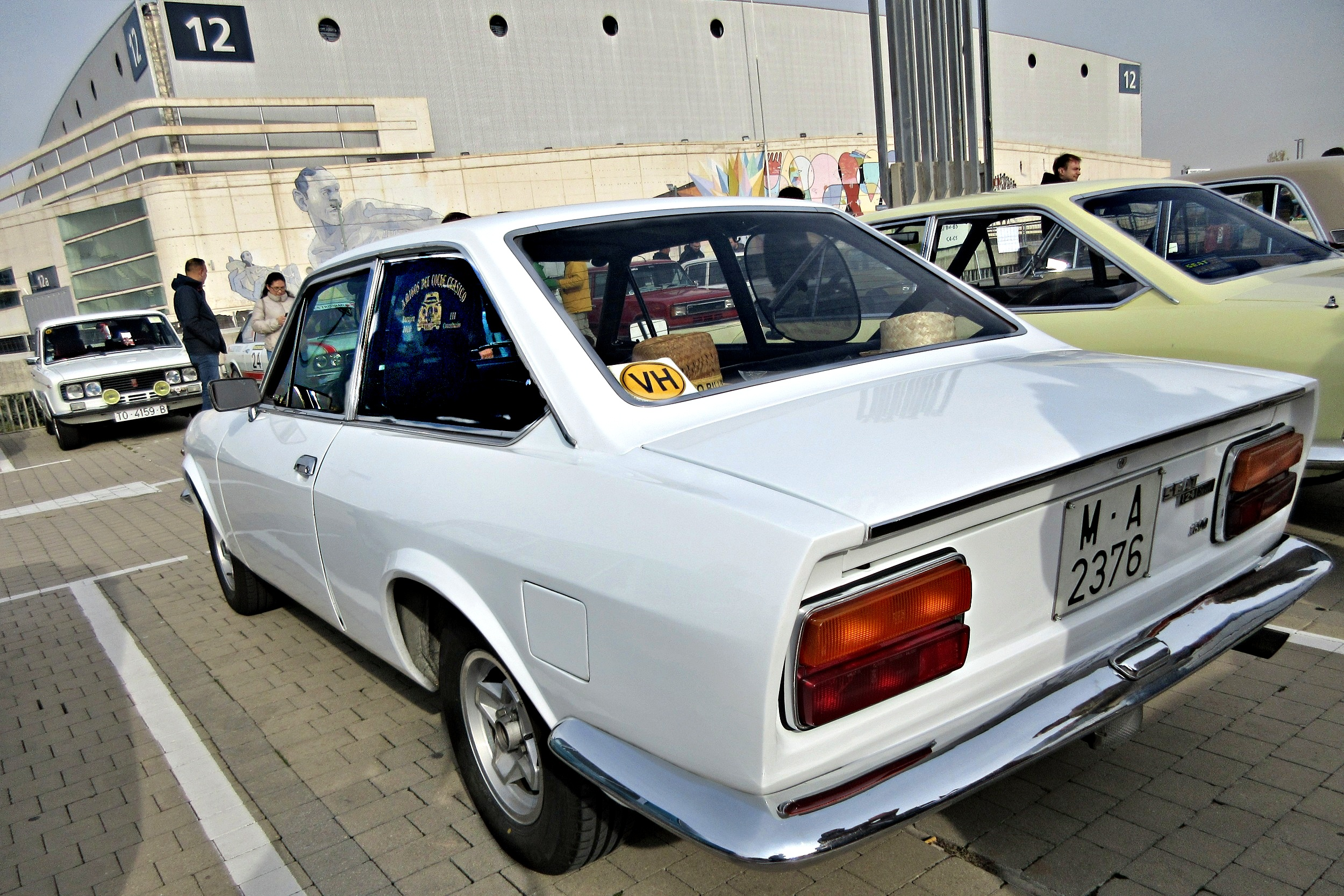
Rear view (pre-facelift)

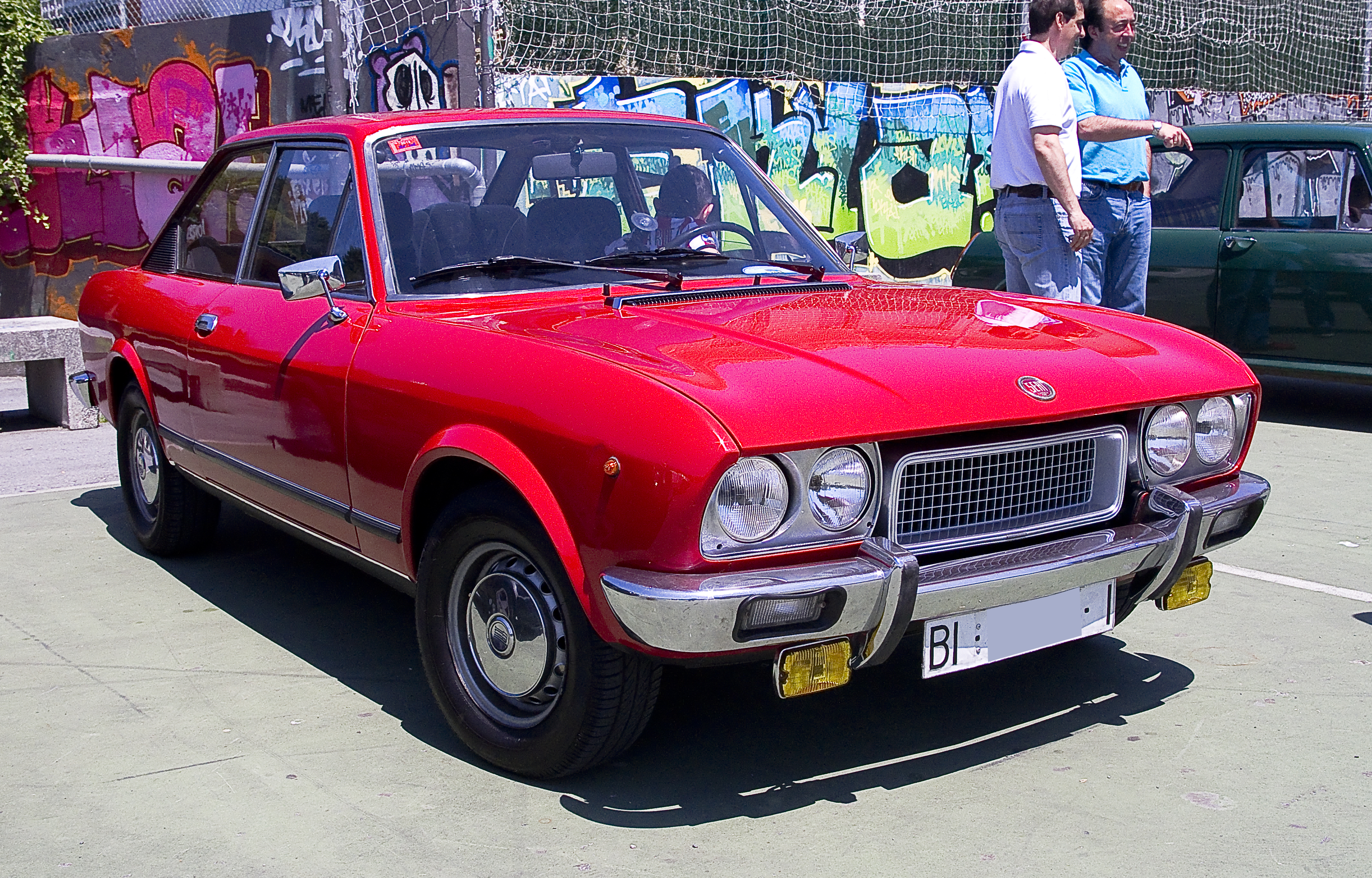
1975 SEAT 124 Sport 1800 (facelift)

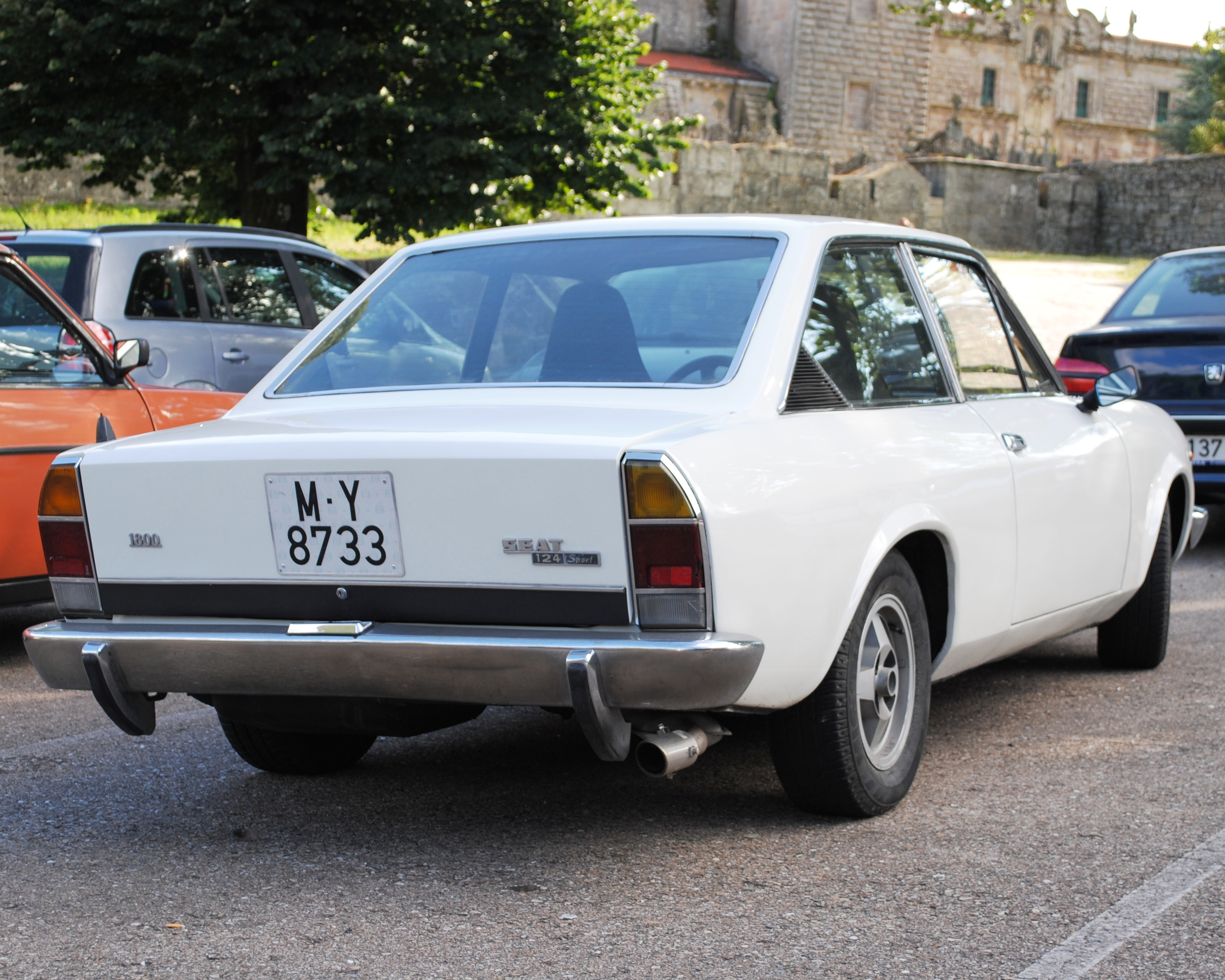
Rear view (facelift)

=== SEAT 1430 ===
A special, more upmarket variant of the 124 was offered as the SEAT 1430. Available as a sedan and a five-door station wagon, it was based on the Fiat 124 Special, from which it differed mainly in aesthetic details, such as its distinctive grille and twin square headlights, among other features borrowed from the higher-class Fiat 125.
