= SEAT 131 =

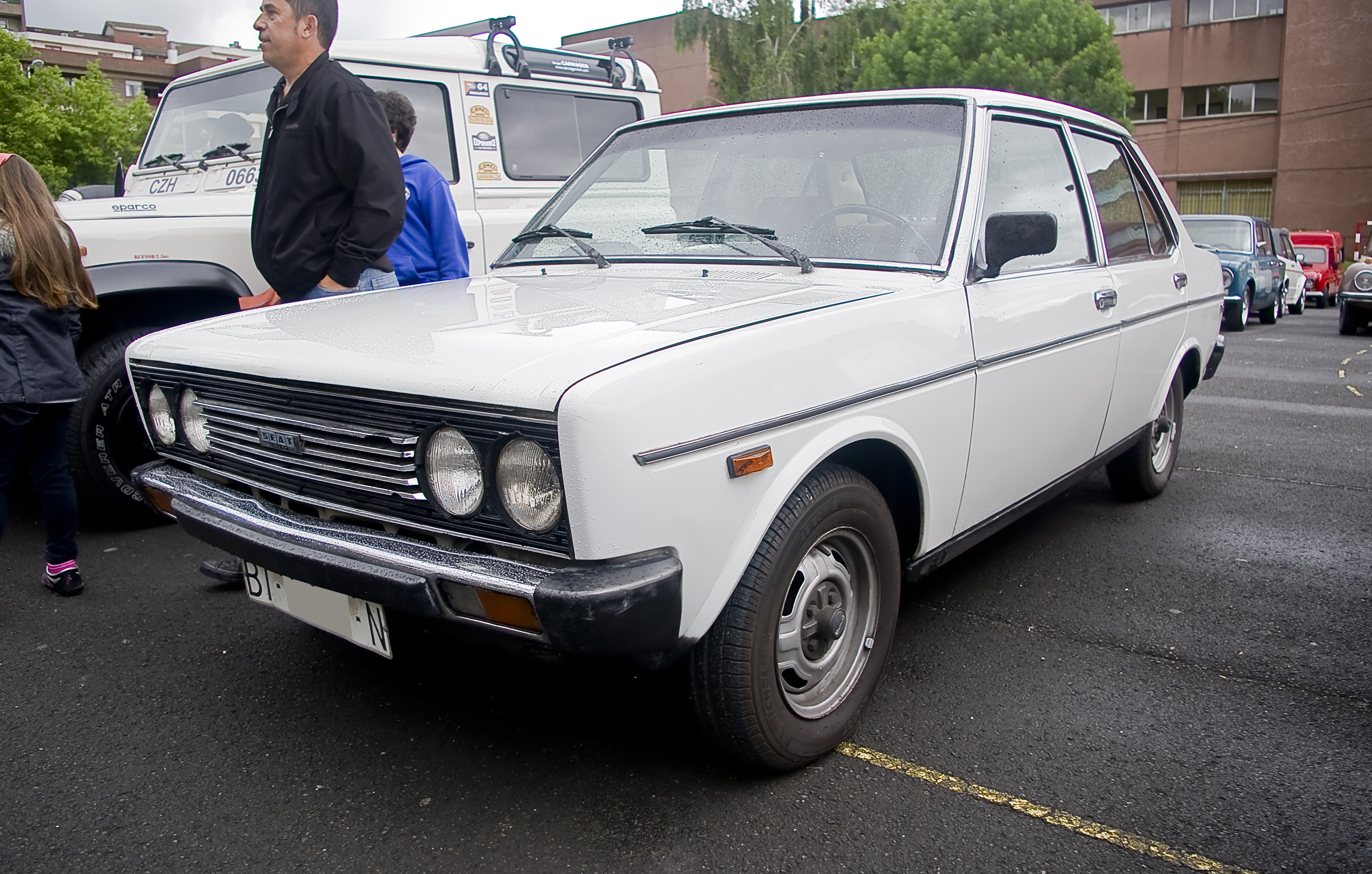
- 1977 SEAT 131 E (First series)

Overview
- Manufacturer: SEAT
- Production: 1975–1984
- Assembly: Spain: Barcelona (Zona Franca)

Body and chassis
- Class: Small family car (C)
- Body style: 4-door saloon 5-door estate (Familiar)
- Related: Fiat 131; Tofaş Şahin; Tofaş Murat 131; Tofaş Dogan; Tofaş Kartal (estate)

Powertrain
- Engine: 1.4–1.9L I4 (Gasoline); 2.0–2.4L I4 (Diesel)
- Transmission: 4 and 5-speed manual 3-speed automatic

Dimensions
- Wheelbase: 2,490 mm (98.0 in)
- Length: 4,230 mm (166.5 in)
- Width: 1,630 mm (64.2 in)
- Height: 1,380 mm (54.3 in)
- Kerb weight: 970 kg (2,140 lb) to 1,035 kg (2,282 lb)

Chronology
- Predecessor: SEAT 1430
- Successor: SEAT Málaga

The SEAT 131 is a mid-size family car produced by the Spanish car manufacturer SEAT from 1975 to the middle of 1984. The SEAT 131 was presented in May 1975 in the Barcelona Motor Show.

With SEAT having formed a partnership with Fiat, the SEAT 131 was a rebadged version of the Fiat 131, which had been presented nine months earlier in Turin. It received a few locally produced engines and other concessions to the Spanish market and was only offered with a 4-door sedan and five-door station wagon configuration.

The SEAT 131 entered production in early 1975 in Barcelona and up to the end of its production life cycle 412,948 units were produced.

== Versions ==
=== First series (1975–1977) ===
Unlike its Italian counterpart, where the 131 was launched as a successor of the 124, in Spain the 131 did not mean the end of the SEAT 124's sales. It remained as a complement to the 131, sharing many mechanical components with it, while the 131 initially took the place of the SEAT 1430, derived from the 124 Special but considered a different - more upmarket - model from the 124 in Spain.

Two sedan versions were offered: the SEAT 131 L, featuring rectangular front lamps, 1438 cc OHC engine and four-speed gearbox, and the SEAT 131 E which featured four round headlamps, a 1592 cc DOHC engine, and a five-speed gearbox.

The range grew up in the spring of 1976 with the SEAT 131 5 puertas unofficially known as the SEAT 131 Familiar, which was the estate version offered with both engines. In 1977 the 131 Automatico (Automatic gearbox) was released and the following year a very short production of the SEAT 131 CLX 1800 was offered.

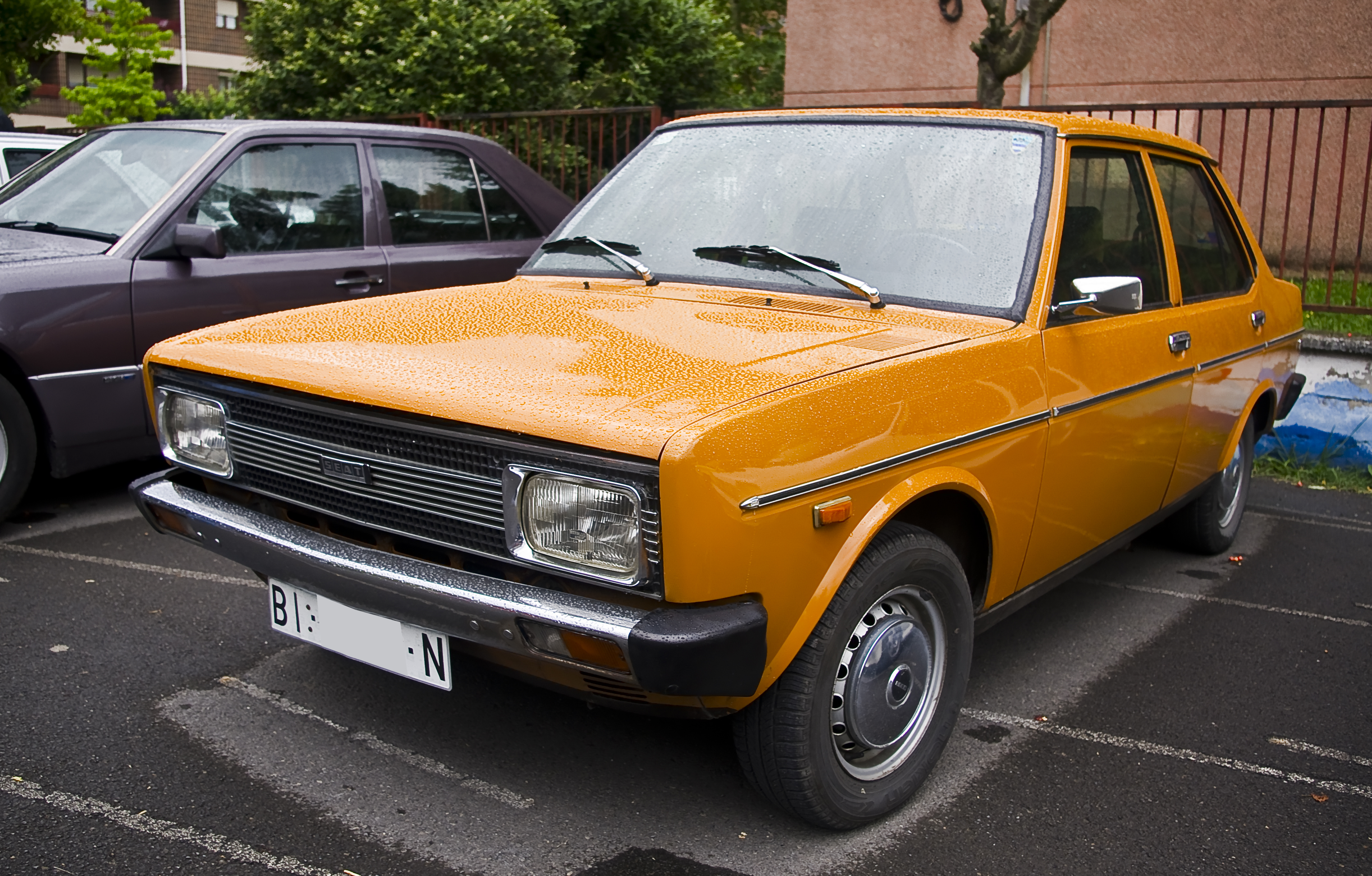
1977 SEAT 131 L 1430

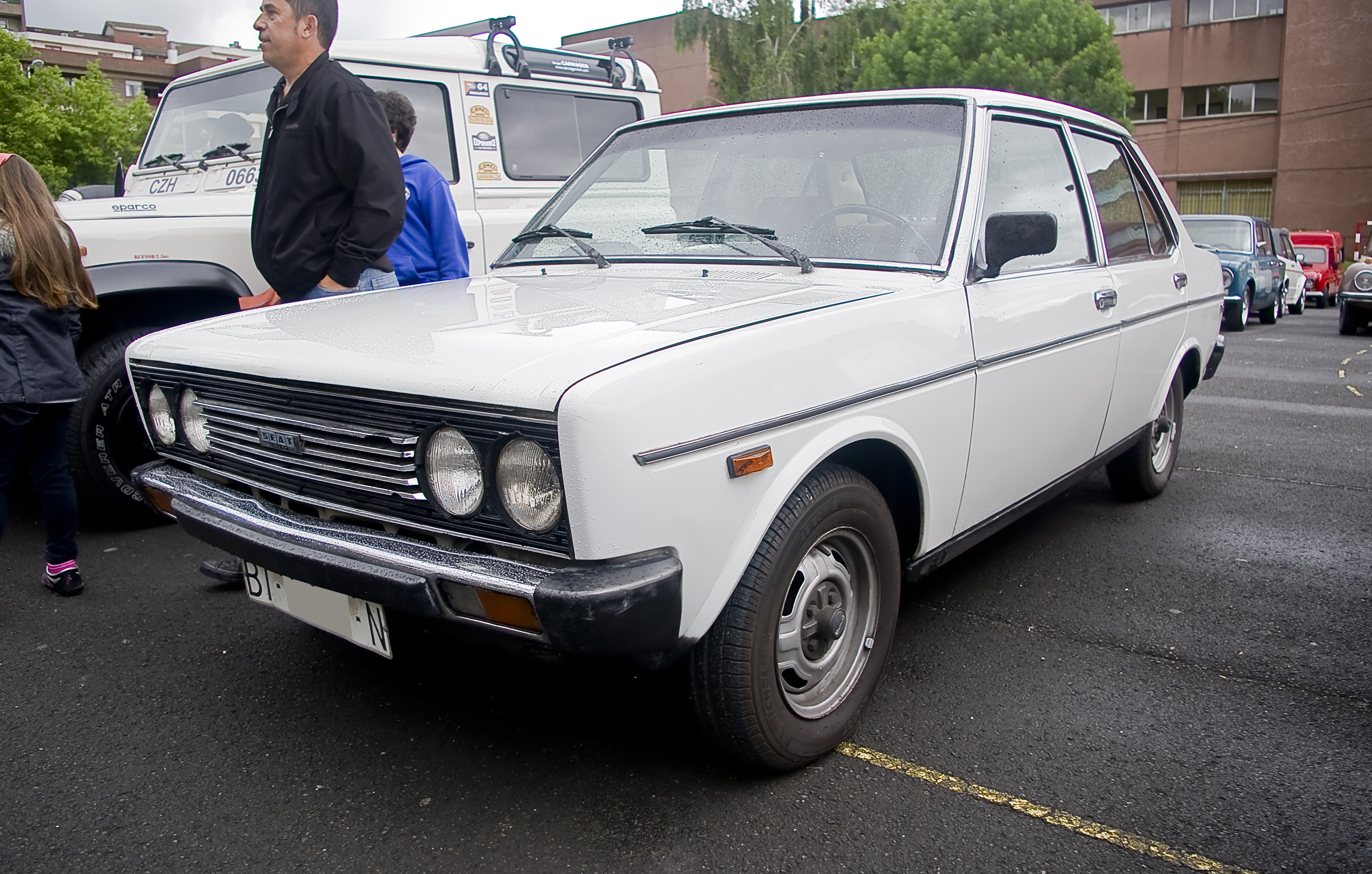
1977 SEAT 131 E 1600

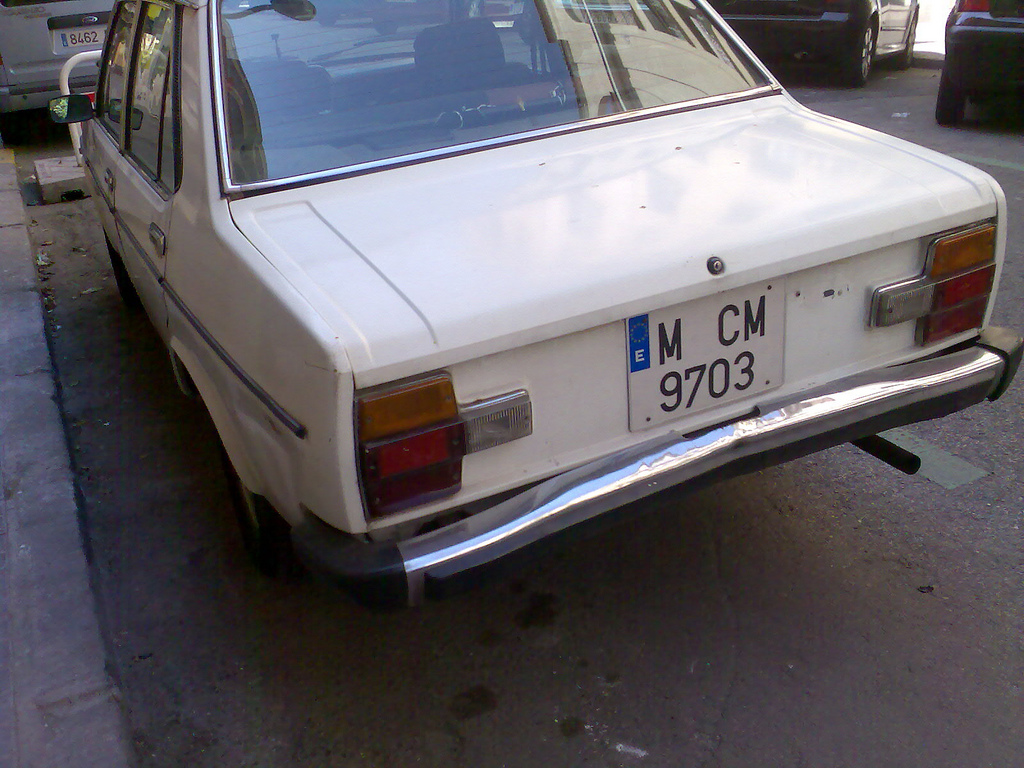
First series SEAT 131 (rear view)

=== Second series (1978–1981) ===
In 1978, the SEAT 131 evolves into the SEAT 131 Mirafiori/Supermirafiori (Panorama for the estate versions), with the same changes as seen on its Italian cousin. The engines remained largely the same, but a 1.8 liter diesel Perkins 4.108 engine was also available from 1979. In 1981, the Diesel version was developed with a new Sofim engine. This 2500 cc engine was much more powerful than the Perkins version (72 hp against only 49 hp) and was one of the most successful taxis in Spain during the early 1980s.

A new CLX edition was launched in 1980. Available only in metallic silver or metallic bronze colours, this 131 CLX had a 1919 cc engine, developing 114 PS (84 kW) at 5800 rpm.

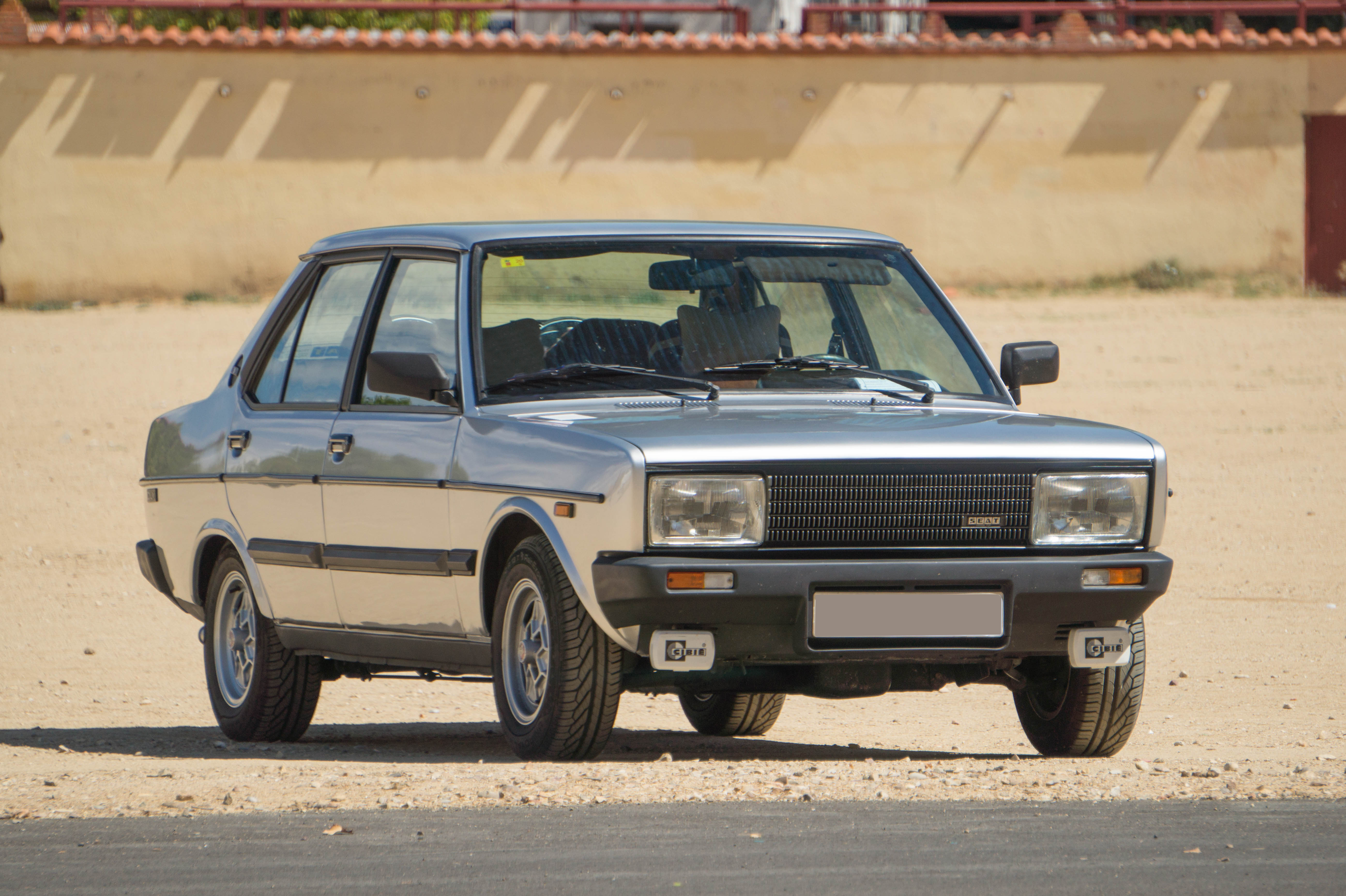
1980 SEAT 131 Supermirafiori CLX 2000

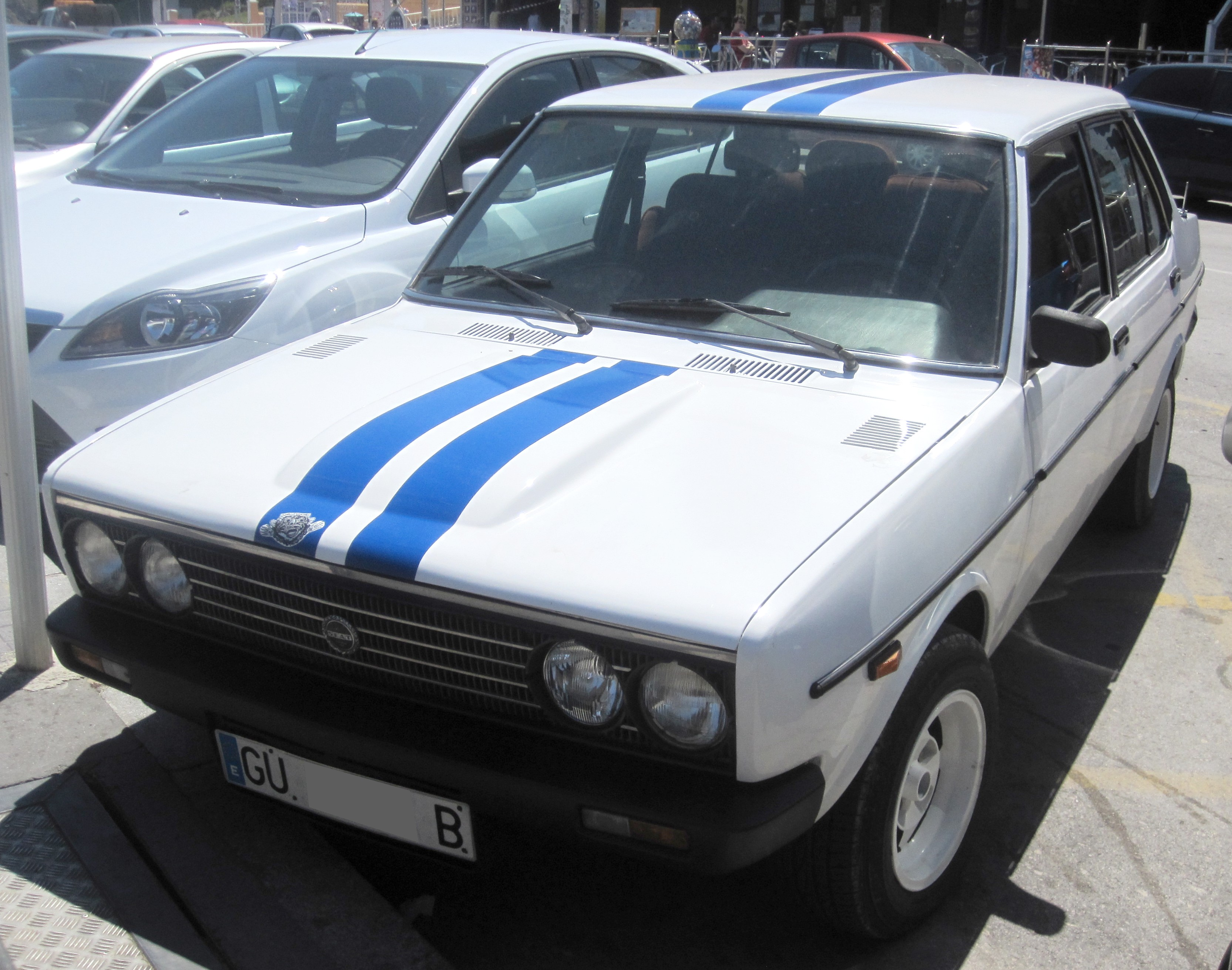
1979 Seat 131 Supermirafiori (diesel)

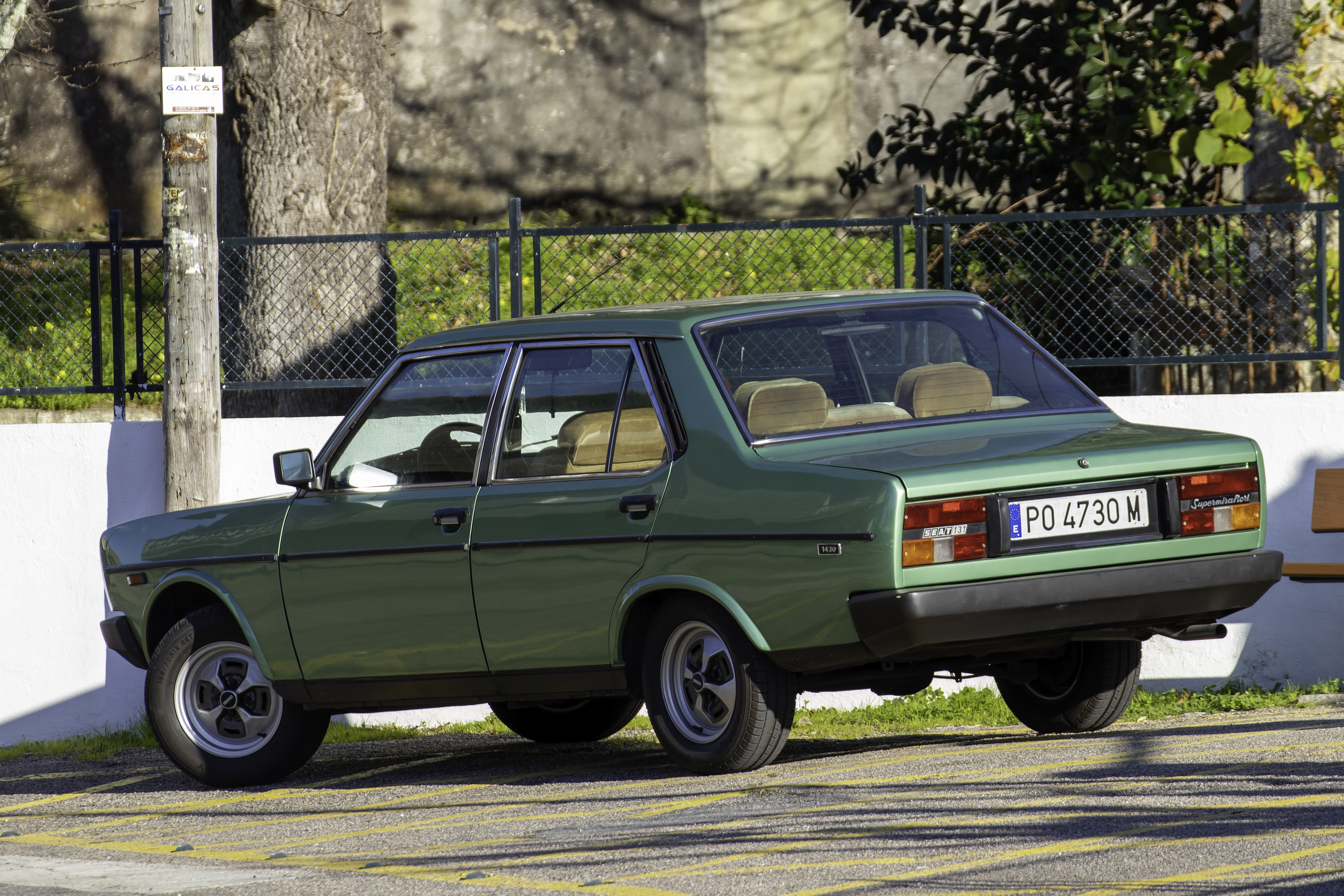
SEAT 131 Supermirafiori 1430 (rear view)

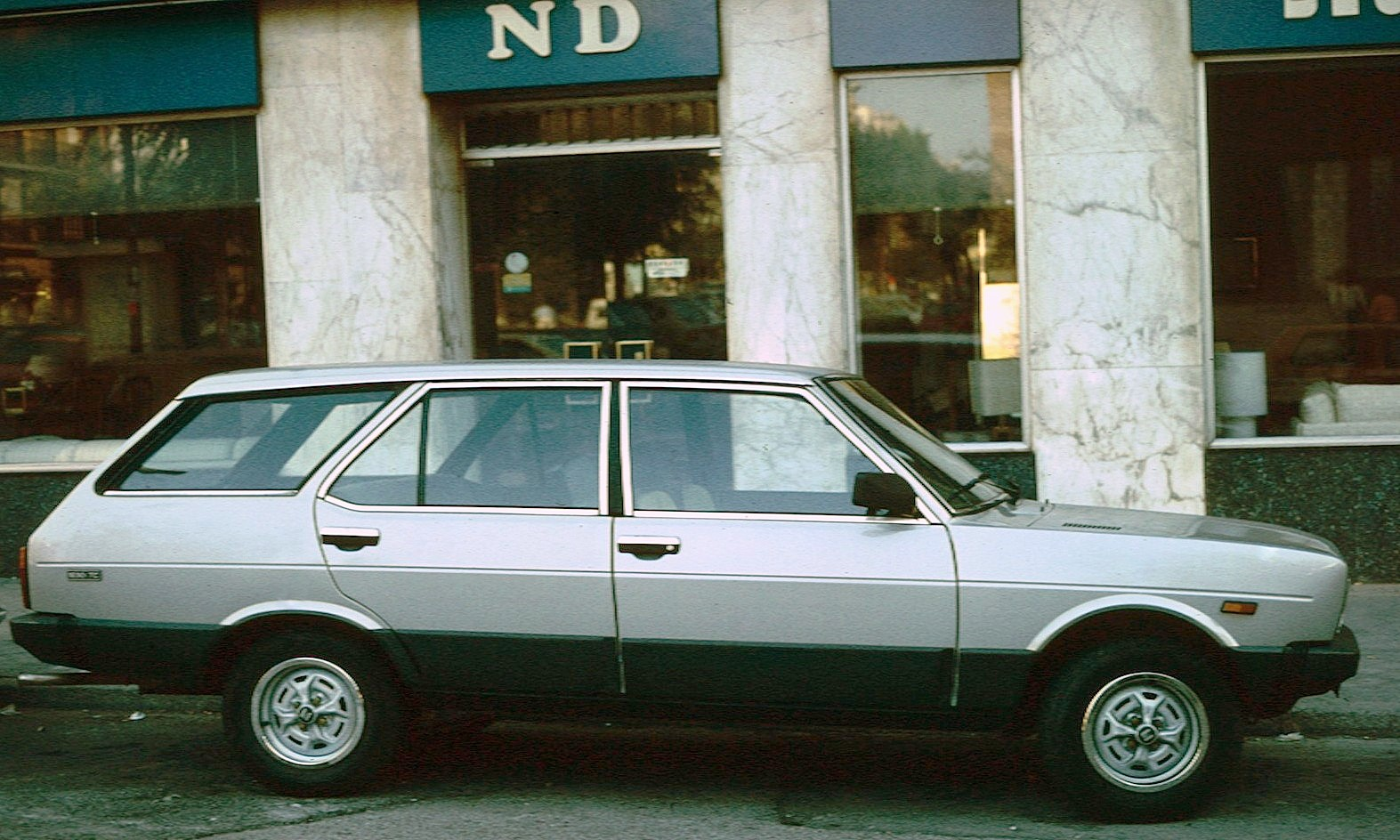
1979 SEAT 131 Panorama

=== Third series (1982–1984) ===
In 1982, the SEAT 131 changed again, gathering all the body changes seen on the Fiat 131 series 3. The 131 was now available in CL, Supermirafiori and Diplomatic versions. The Diplomatic was the top of the range, with a 1,995 cc engine and features such as power steering, power windows or air conditioning. The Panorama versions were the cars chosen by the "Cuerpo Nacional de Policia" (Spanish Police force) as patrol cars.

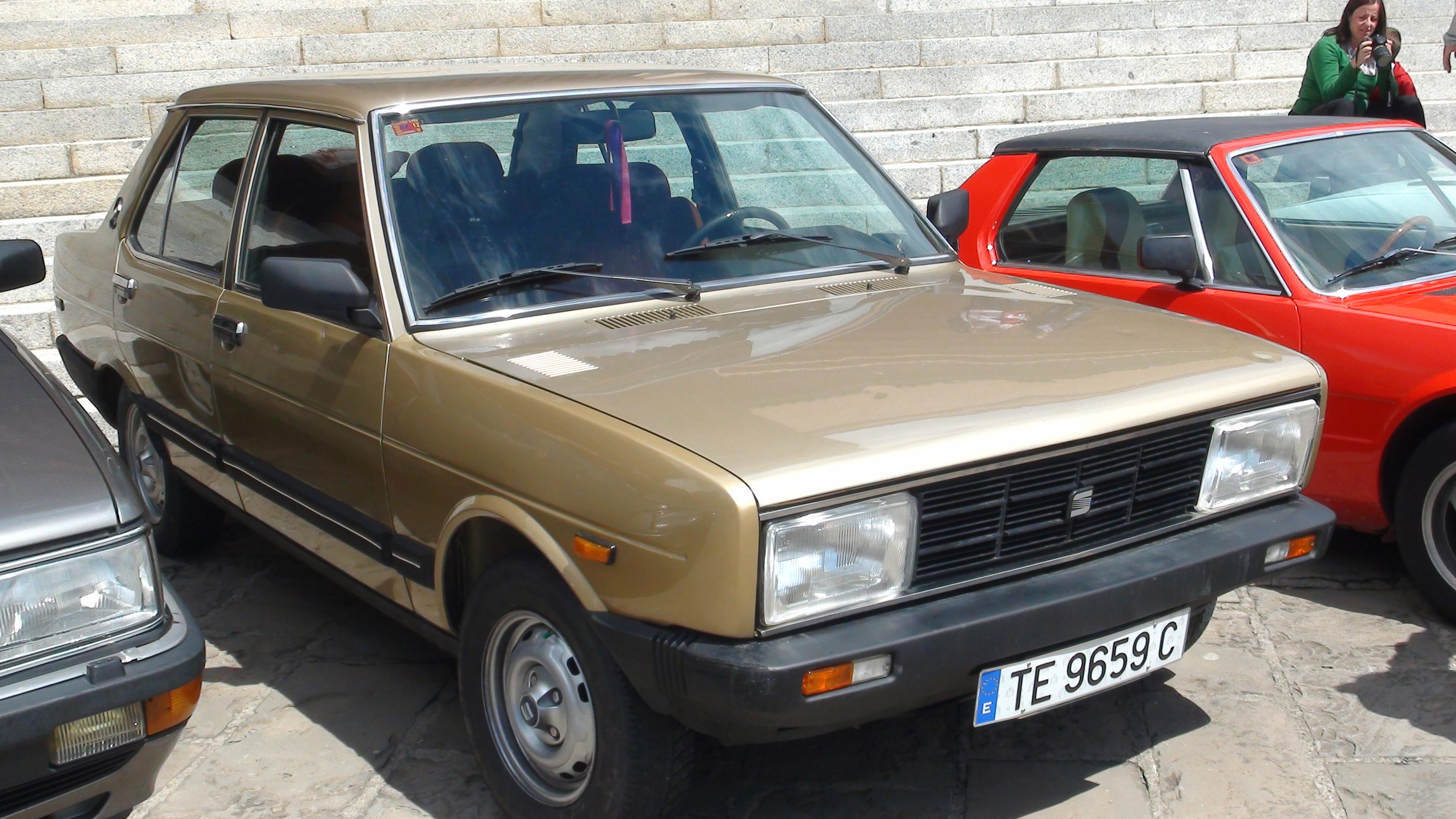
SEAT 131 FL

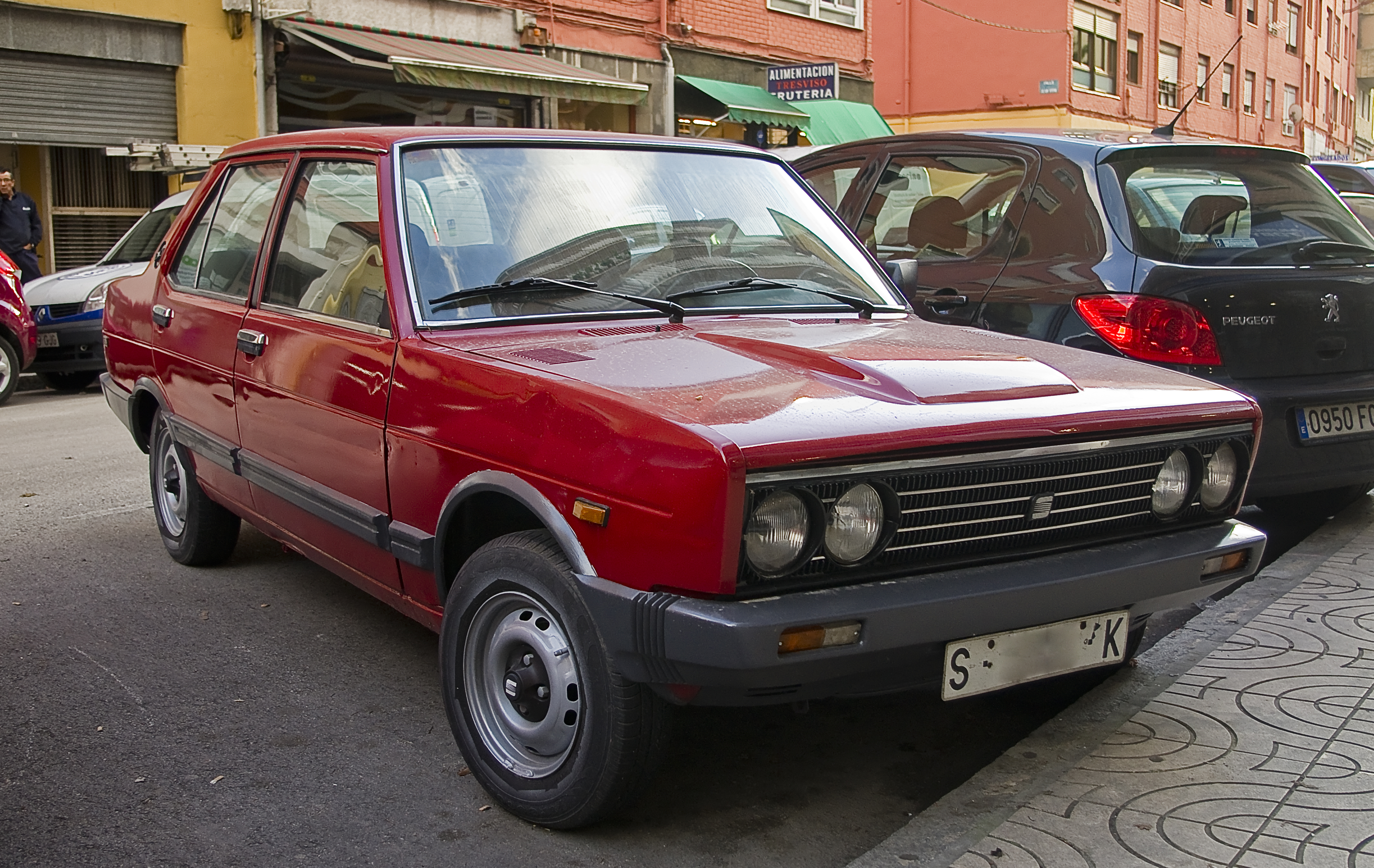
1983 Seat 131 Mirafiori CLD (diesel)

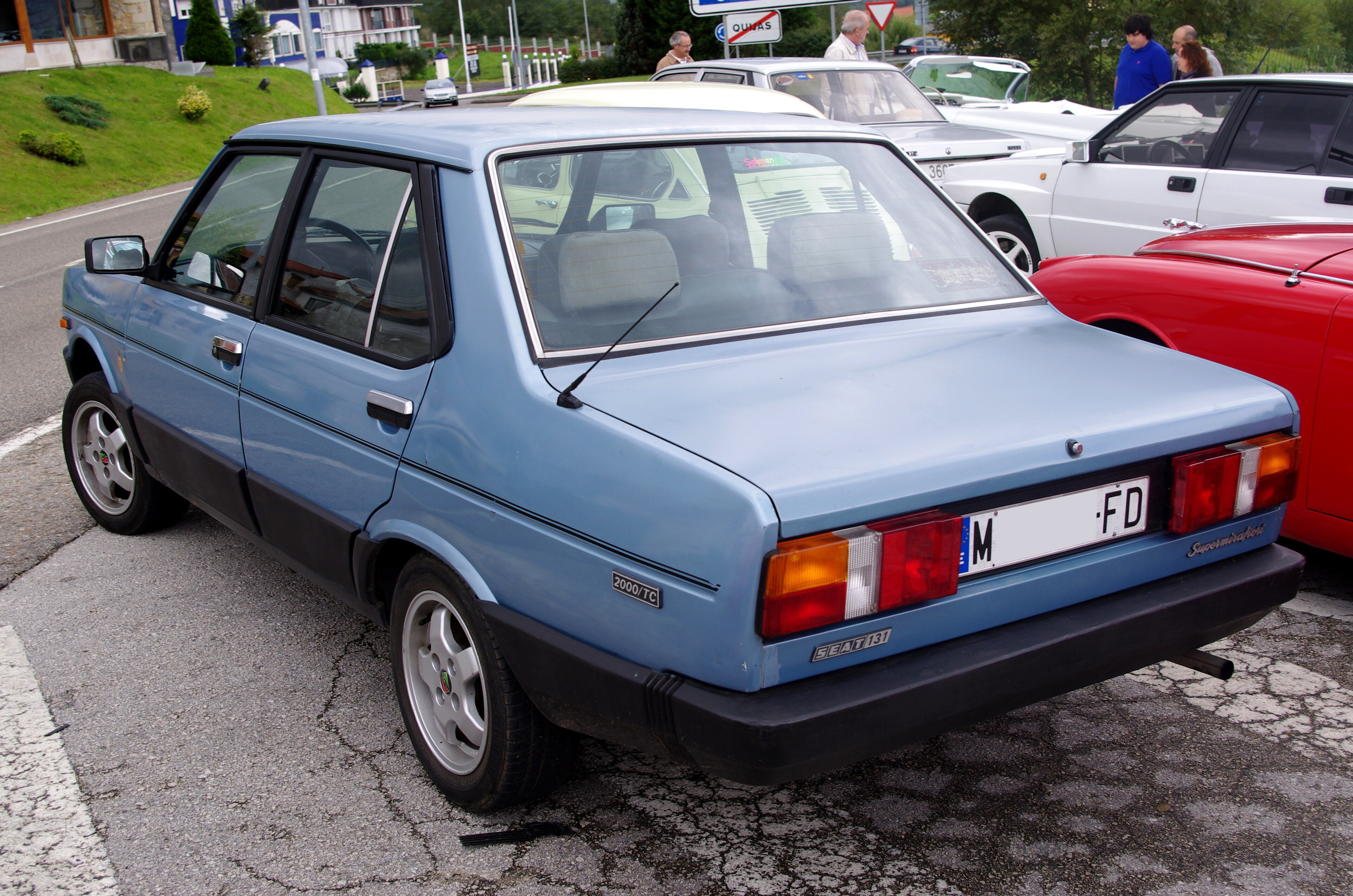
1983 SEAT 131 Supermirafiori (rear view)

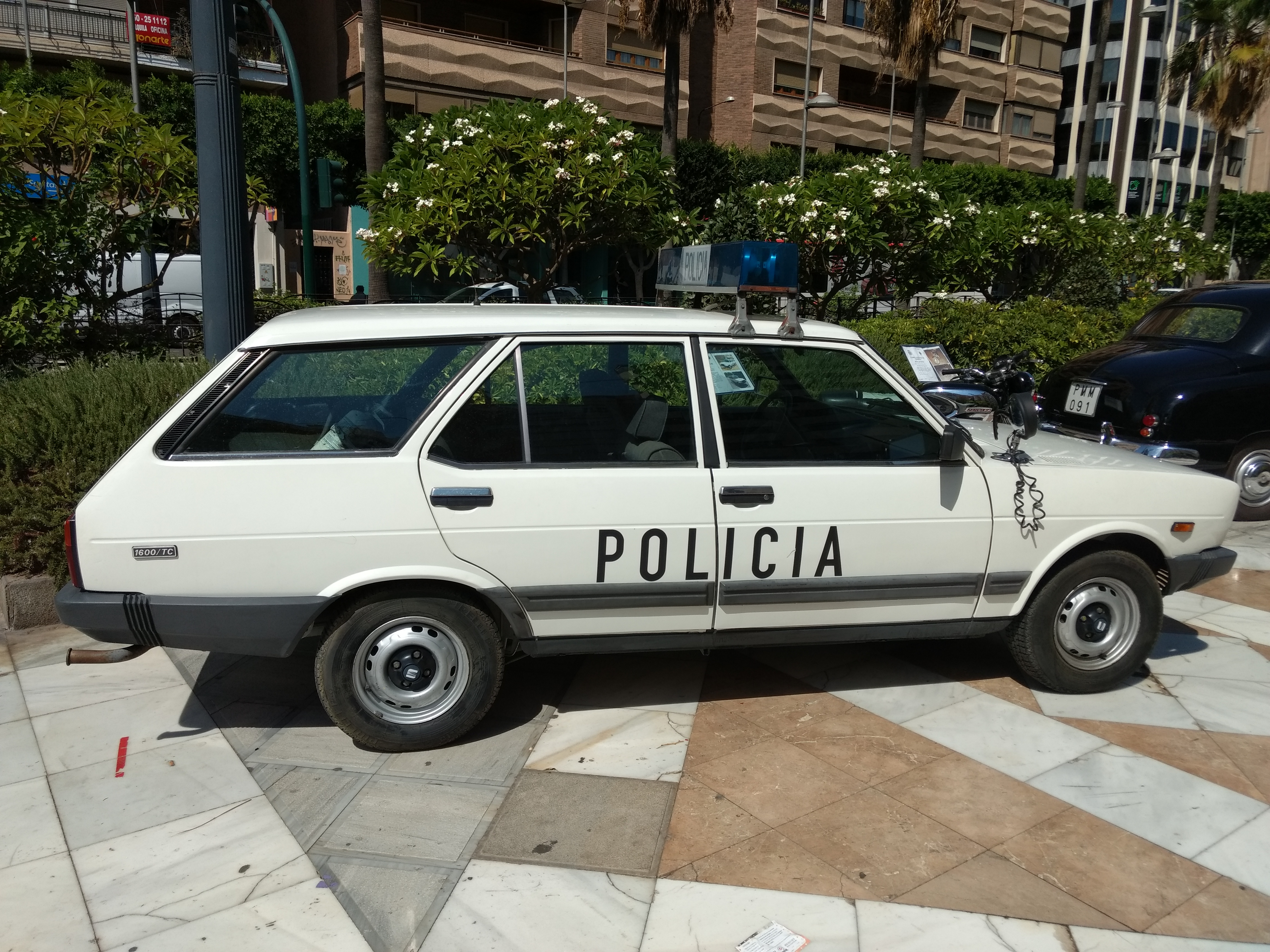
SEAT 131 Panorama Cuerpo Nacional de Policía

In 1984, the whole SEAT 131 range was phased out, without a direct substitute. The brand new Ronda-based SEAT Málaga took its place in 1985.

== Curiosities ==
The implementation of the diesel engines in the SEAT 131 range took place almost four years after its launch. This would practically exclude the use of the SEAT 131 in the taxi fleet, in spite of its significant performance in both comfort and roominess. In the meantime however, for a great number of Spanish taxi owners and other professionals who were opting for the SEAT 131 as their taxicab of choice, a very common practice was the after-market replacement with a diesel engine of a newly purchased gasoline-powered SEAT 131. Engines that were widely used for this purpose were derived from Perkins, Barreiros, Mercedes-Benz and Sava, but the most widespread option was the Sava 1,795 cc engine producing 52 hp (38 kW).

== Awards ==
- Car of the Year 1976, from the Spanish newspaper ABC
- Car of the Year 1979, from the Spanish magazine Motorpress

== Technical specifications ==
Technical data SEAT 131
SEAT 131	L/ 1430	E/ 1600	1800	CLX/ 2000	Diesel	2500 Diesel
Engine:	4-cylinder-inline petrol engine				4-cylinder-inline diesel engine	
Displacement:	1,438 cc	1,592 cc	1,756 cc	1,919 cc	1,995 cc	2,445 cc
Bore x Stroke:	80 x 71.5 mm	80 x 79.2 mm	84 x 79.2 mm	84 x 86.6 mm	88 x 82 mm	93 x 90 mm
Max. Power @ rpm:	75 PS (55 kW) @ 5400	95 PS (70 kW) @ 6000	107 PS (79 kW) @ 6000	114 PS (84 kW) @ 5800	60 PS (44 kW) @ 4400	72 PS (53 kW) @ 4200
Compression Ratio:	9.0:1	8.98:1	8.9:1	9.38:1	22.0:1	
Fuel system:	Weber 32 DHS 24/250	Weber 34 DMS 1/250	Weber 34 DMS 2/250	Weber 34 DMS 4/150	Bosch VE (CAV)	
Valvetrain:	OHC, tooth belt	DOHC, tooth belt			OHC, tooth belt	
Cooling:	Water					
Gearbox:	4-speed-manual for L/ 1430; 5-speed manual optional for E/ 1600 - 1800 - CLX/ 2000 - Diesel - 2500 Diesel; 3-speed automatic optional for 131 E/ 1600 rear wheel drive					
Front suspension:	MacPherson struts, coil springs, telescopic shock absorbers, stabilizing bar					
Rear suspension::	Live axle, coil springs, telescopic shock absorbers					
Brakes:	Front disc brakes and rear drum brakes					
Steering:	Rack					
Length x Width x Height:	4,231 mm (166.6 in) (Confort lujo) / 4,264 mm (167.9 in) (Normal, Confort and Break) x 1,651 mm (65.0 in) x 1,381 mm (54.4 in) (4p) / 1,389 mm (54.7 in) (Break) mm					
Weight:	985 kg (2,172 lb)	1,015 kg (2,238 lb)		1,040 kg (2,290 lb)	1,160 kg (2,560 lb)	1,200 kg (2,600 lb)
Top speed:	155 km/h (96 mph) (4p) - 150 km/h (93 mph) (Break)	165 km/h (103 mph) (4p) - 160 km/h (99 mph) (Break)	175 km/h (109 mph)	180 km/h (110 mph)	145 km/h (90 mph)	150 km/h (93 mph)
Average fuel consumption:	8.8 L/100 km (32 mpg_{‑imp}; 27 mpg_{‑US})	9.7 L/100 km (29 mpg_{‑imp}; 24 mpg_{‑US})	10.0 L/100 km (28 mpg_{‑imp}; 24 mpg_{‑US})	10.5 L/100 km (27 mpg_{‑imp}; 22 mpg_{‑US})	8.0 L/100 km (35 mpg_{‑imp}; 29 mpg_{‑US})	8.5 L/100 km (33 mpg_{‑imp}; 28 mpg_{‑US})
