= Hyundai Accent =

Subcompact car produced by Hyundai

- Fifth-generation Accent (HC)

Overview
- Manufacturer: Hyundai
- Production: 1994–present

Body and chassis
- Class: Subcompact car (B)
- Layout: Front-engine, front-wheel-drive

Chronology
- Predecessor: Hyundai Excel

The Hyundai Accent (Korean: 현대 엑센트), or Hyundai Verna (현대 베르나) is a subcompact car produced by Hyundai. In Australia, the first generation models carried over the Hyundai Excel name used by the Accent's predecessor. The Accent was replaced in 2000 by the Hyundai Verna in South Korea, although most international markets, including the US, retained the "Accent" name. The "Accent" name is an acronym of Advanced Compact Car of Epoch-making New Technology.

The Accent is produced for the Chinese market by Beijing Hyundai Co., a joint venture with Beijing Automotive Industry Corp. For the Russian market it was assembled by the TagAZ plant in Taganrog until 2011, and since 2011 it was assembled by the HMMR plant in Saint Petersburg and sold under the new name Hyundai Solaris. In Mexico, the Accent was marketed until 2014 by Chrysler as the Dodge Attitude, previously known as the Verna by Dodge. In Venezuela, Chrysler marketed these models as the Dodge Brisa until 2006. The Brisa was assembled by Mitsubishi Motors at its plant in Barcelona, Venezuela. Since 2002, the Accent had been the longest-running small family car sold in North America. In Puerto Rico, the second and third generations were sold as the Hyundai Brio.

== First generation (X3; 1994) ==
First generation
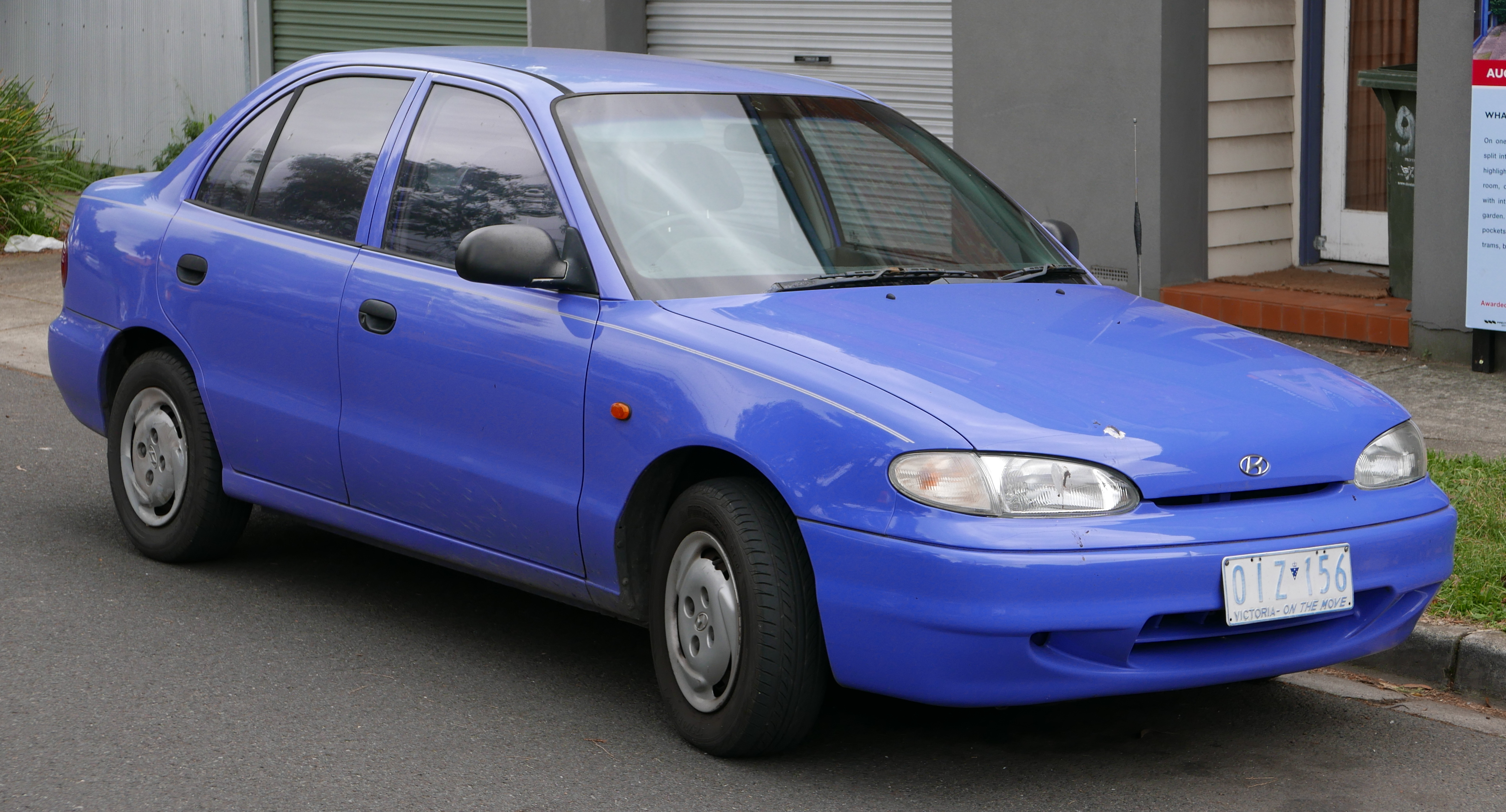
- Pre-facelift Hyundai Excel sedan (Australia)

Overview
- Model code: X3
- Also called: Hyundai Accent Verna; Hyundai Excel; Hyundai Pony (France); Bimantara Cakra (Indonesia); Yueda-Kia Qianlima (China); Dodge Brisa (Venezuela)
- Production: 1994–1999 (South Korea); 1995–2006 (Egypt); 1996–2005 (Indonesia); 2002–2006 (China)
- Model years: 1995–1999 (North America)
- Assembly: South Korea: Ulsan; Turkey: Alikahya, İzmit, Kocaeli Province (HAOS); China: Yancheng, Jiangsu (DYK, Kia Qianlima); Egypt: Cairo (Ghabbour Group); Venezuela: Barcelona (MMC Automoriz); Indonesia: Bekasi (Bimantara/Hyundai Indonesia); Botswana: Gaborone (TMBC)

Body and chassis
- Body style: 4-door sedan 3/5-door liftback

Powertrain
- Engine: Petrol: 1.3 L Alpha SOHC 12V I4; 1.5 L Alpha SOHC 12V I4; 1.5 L Alpha II DOHC 16V I4; 1.6 L Alpha II DOHC 16V I4 (China)
- Transmission: 5-speed M5AF3 manual 4-speed A4AF2 automatic

Dimensions
- Wheelbase: 2,400 mm (94.5 in)
- Length: 4,100 mm (161.4 in) (liftback); 4,117 mm (162.1 in) (sedan)
- Width: 1,620 mm (63.8 in)
- Height: 1,395 mm (54.9 in); 1,410 mm (55.5 in) (Kia Qianlima)
- Curb weight: 2,101–2,150 lb (953–975 kg)

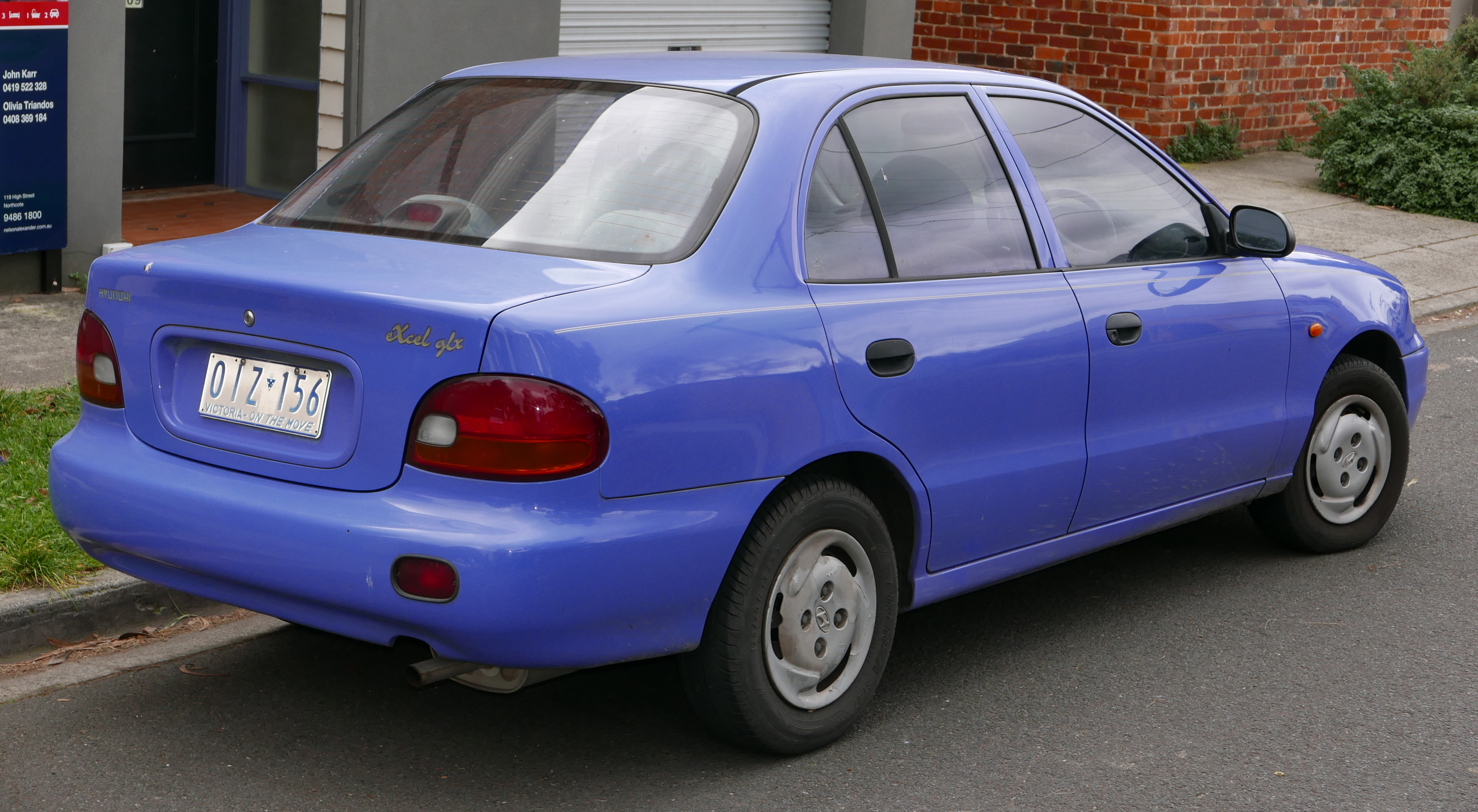
4-door sedan (pre-facelift)

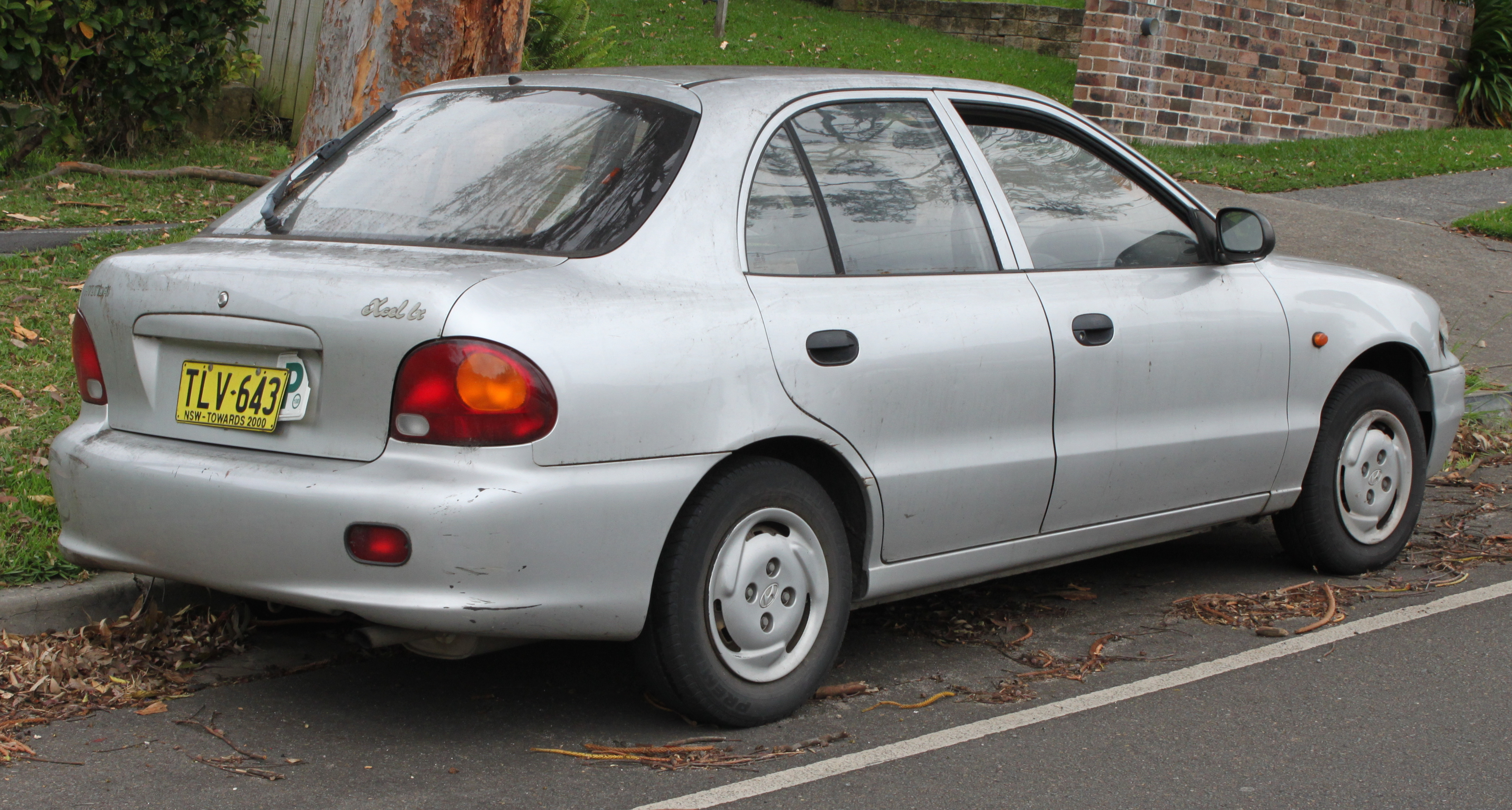
5-door liftback (pre-facelift)

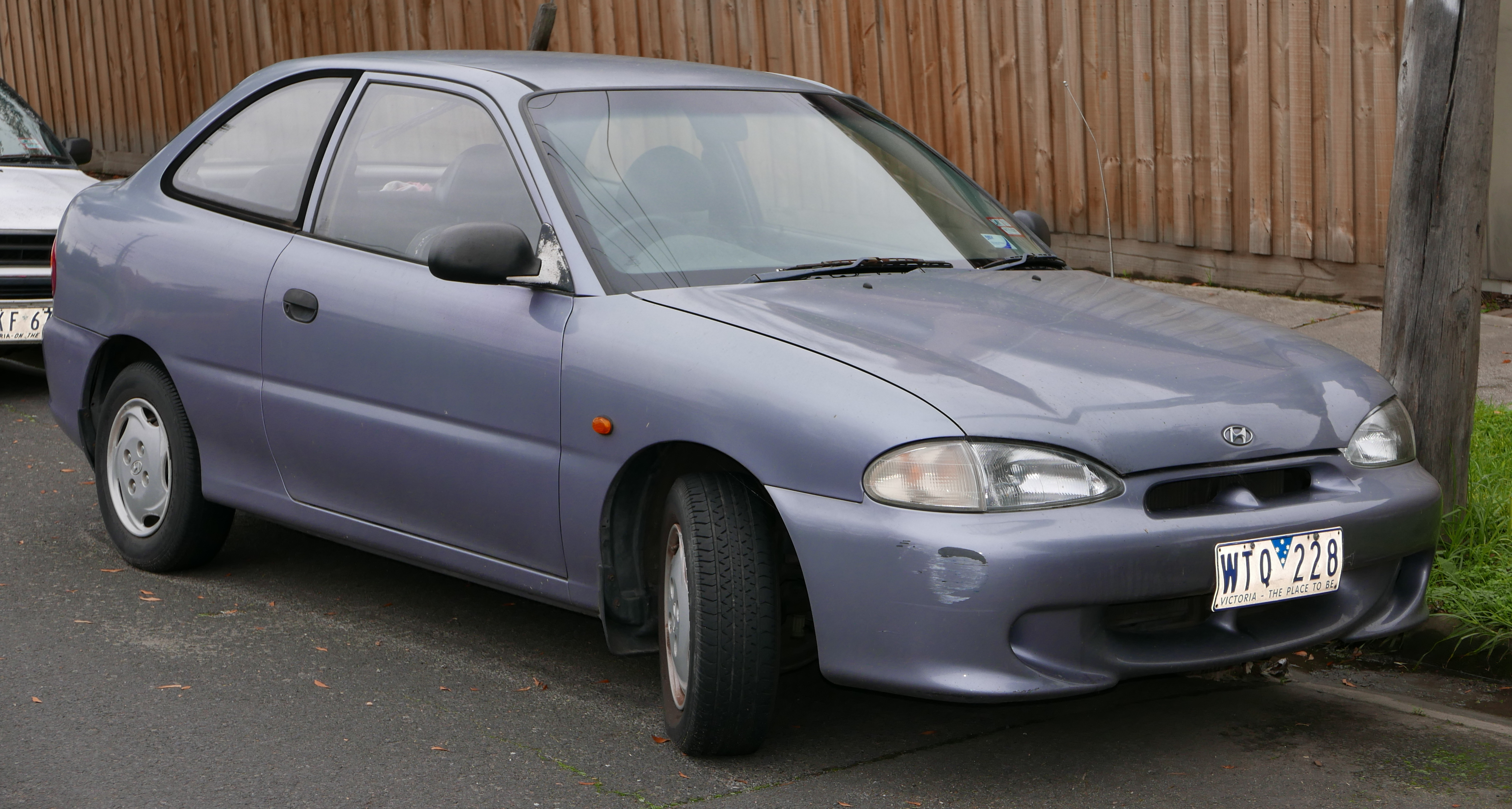

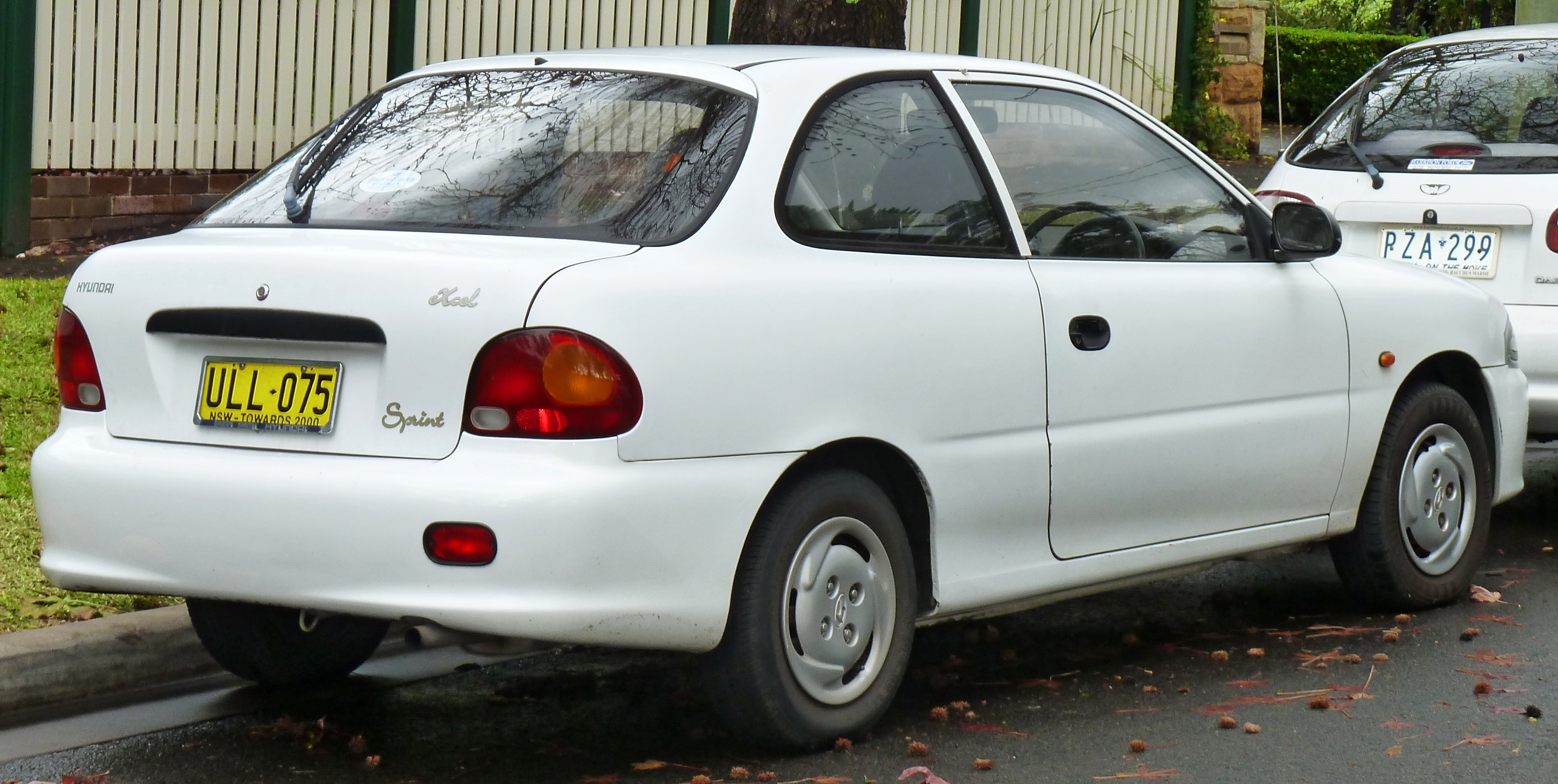
3-door liftback (pre-facelift)

The Hyundai Accent (X3) was introduced as a replacement for the Excel in 1994 for the 1995 model year. It continued to be called Dodge Brisa in Venezuela or Hyundai Excel in some markets, such as the Netherlands, Belgium, Indonesia and Australia. In France, it was called the Hyundai Pony, in Indonesia, the pre-facelift model was called as Bimantara Cakra and in China, it was called the Kia Qianlima.

In 1998, Hyundai created a joint venture with Romanian manufacturer Dacia to produce the Accent in Romania, at Dacia's Mioveni plant. Unfortunately, the deal failed and Dacia was bought by Renault.

=== Markets ===
==== Australia ====
Australian cars were released in November 1994 available in Sprint and GX trims (three-door liftback) or LX and GLX trims (four-door sedan and five-door liftback). The upper-specification models (GX and GLX) had full cloth interior (as opposed to vinyl seat backings), height and lumbar support adjustments on the driver's seat, four-speaker sound system (instead of two), passenger vanity mirror, a tachometer, and power antenna as standard. GX three-doors also had a standard rear spoiler, while power steering was standard on all but the Sprint. There were also some special editions—the Classique sedan in 1995 and 1996 with anti-lock brakes and the Sportz in 1999 and 2000 with alloy wheels and a rear spoiler. The overwhelming majority sold were the Sprint three-door, enticing buyers with free air-conditioning, driveaway pricing and from late 1998, standard power steering.

The facelift arrived in Australia in April 1997 with accompanying trim changes. The engine was a 1.5-litre G4EK SOHC unit with 91 hp (68 kW). From November 1997 onwards, this was upgraded to a twin cam (DOHC) G4FK version with 74 kW (99 hp) at 6000 rpm and torque of 134 N⋅m (99 lb⋅ft) at 4000 rpm. A double overhead cam (DOHC) engine was also available in America in the Accent GT but made a more-powerful 105 hp (78 kW) at 6000 rpm instead. X3s with the DOHC engine are badged "Twin Cam".

In Australia, the X3 proved so popular (due to its reliability and low price) that it was the third best-selling vehicle in the country in both 1996 and 1998. In the latter year, it achieved more than 44,000 sales (a 5.5% share of the total market), a record figure at the time for an imported car. It was the country's top-selling model in June 1998, briefly displacing the Holden Commodore and other large cars that had traditionally dominated the Australian sales charts. Between 1994 and 2000, some 200,000 X3s were sold in Australia, making it arguably the most successful imported vehicle in the country's history.

==== United Kingdom ====
The Accent was sold in saloon (sedan), liftback, and coupé form in the UK, with a choice of three engines for each: a 1.3 12v (85 hp), 1.5 12v (92 hp) and a 1.5 16v (105 hp) petrol. There was no diesel option. A GSi spec car was the top-specification Accent. The MVi-spec coupé version won particular praise for its handling agility in the UK. Although the Accent was cheap to buy and insure, its engines were quite thirsty; the 1.5-litre returned 33 mpg_{‑imp} (8.6 L/100 km; 27 mpg_{‑US}) average according to list figures.

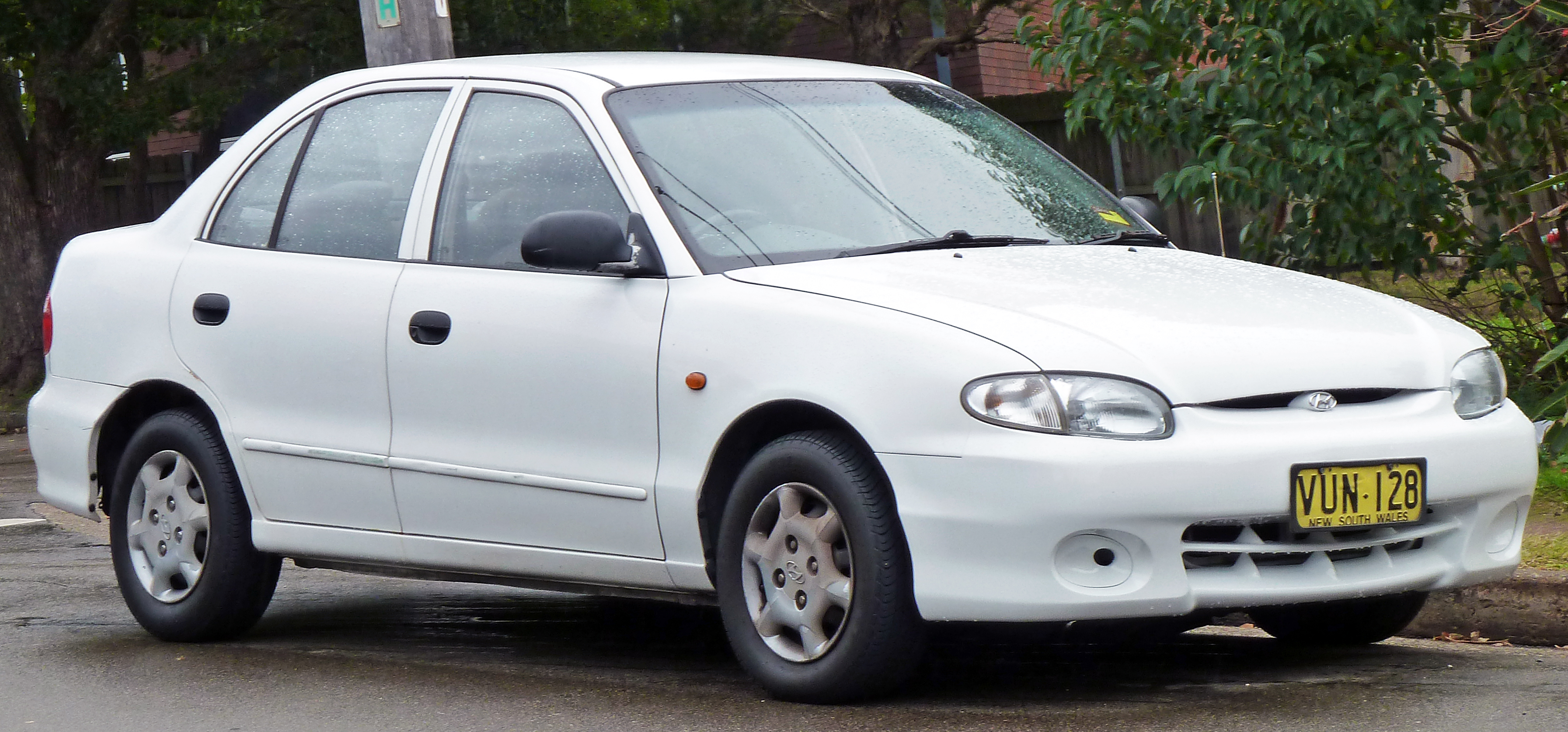

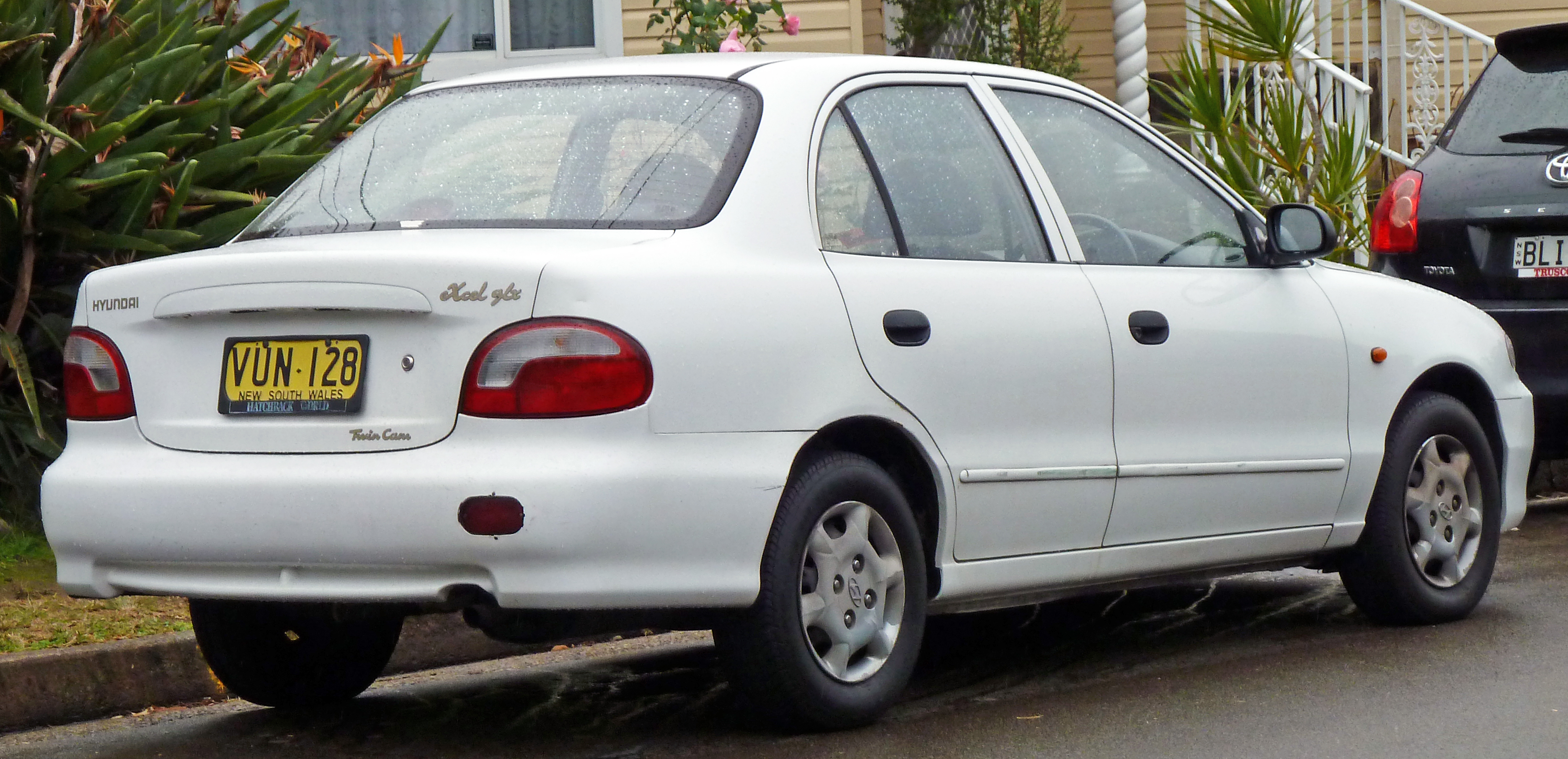
4-door sedan (facelift)

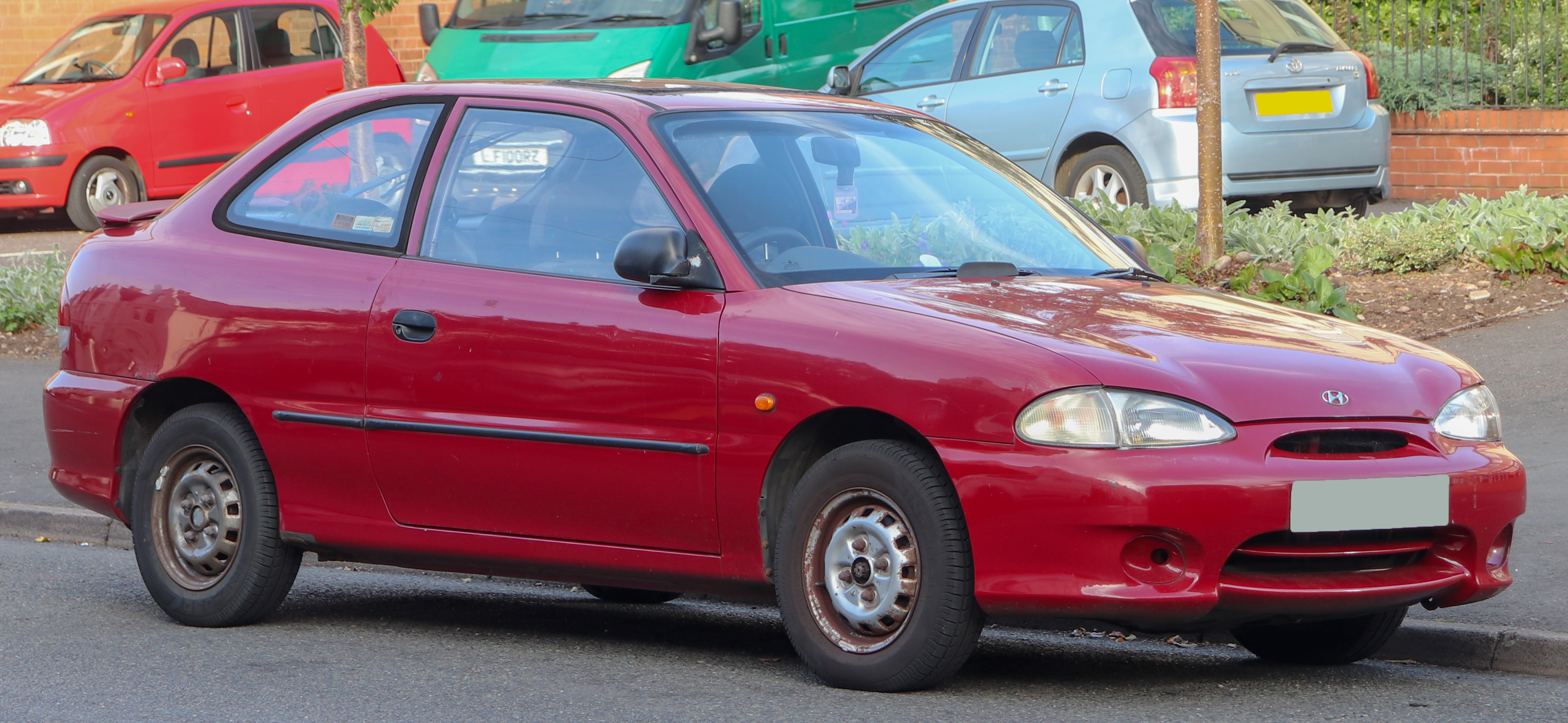

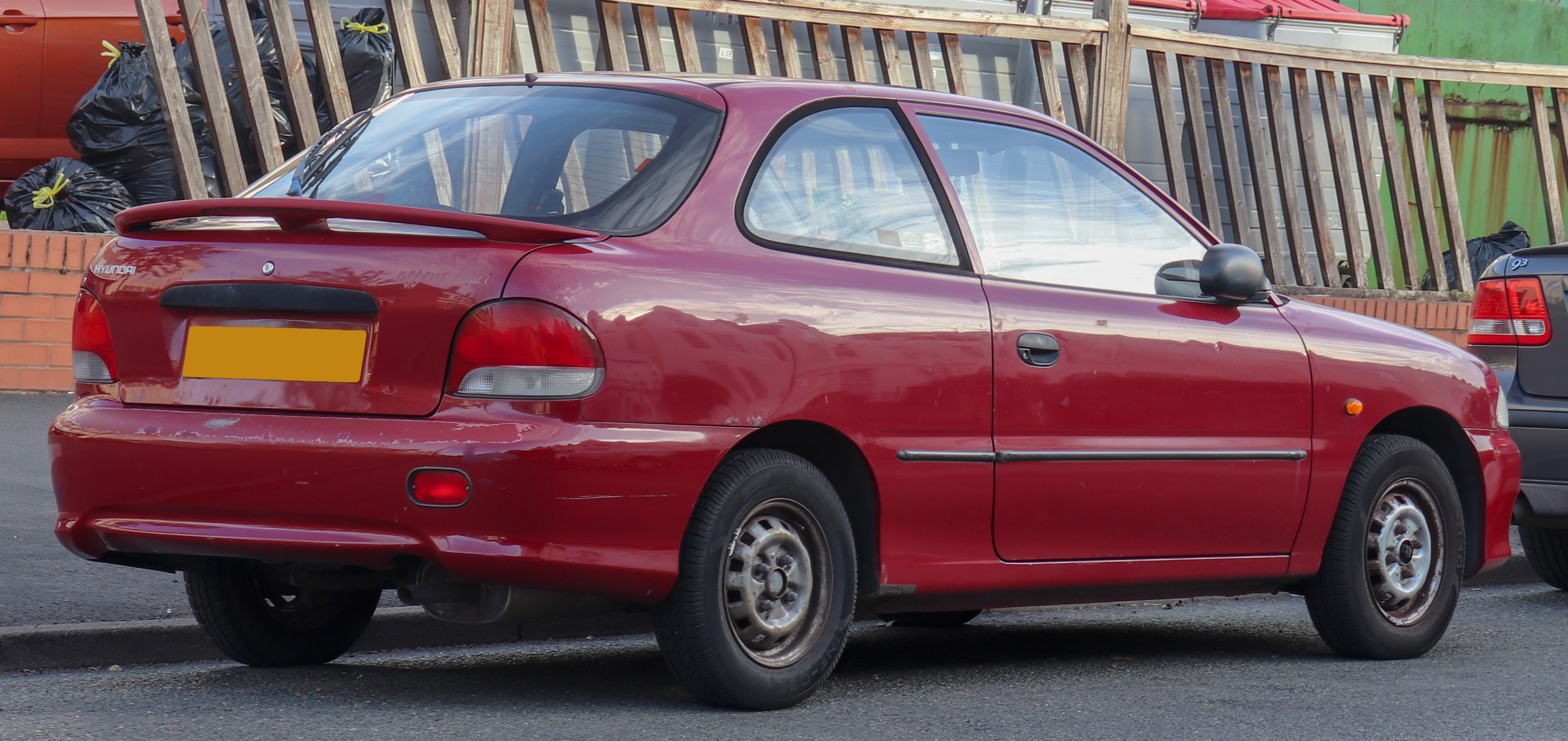
3-door Liftback/coupe (facelift)

==== United States ====
In the US, although manuals exist for Accents before and after 1999, a manual for 1999 Hyundai Accent has not been published. Additionally, owners of the 1999 model were informed by their dealers that the power output of the 1.5-litre engine was in fact rated at 88 horsepower (66 kW). Only the 3-door Liftback and 4-door sedan were offered.

==== Indonesia ====
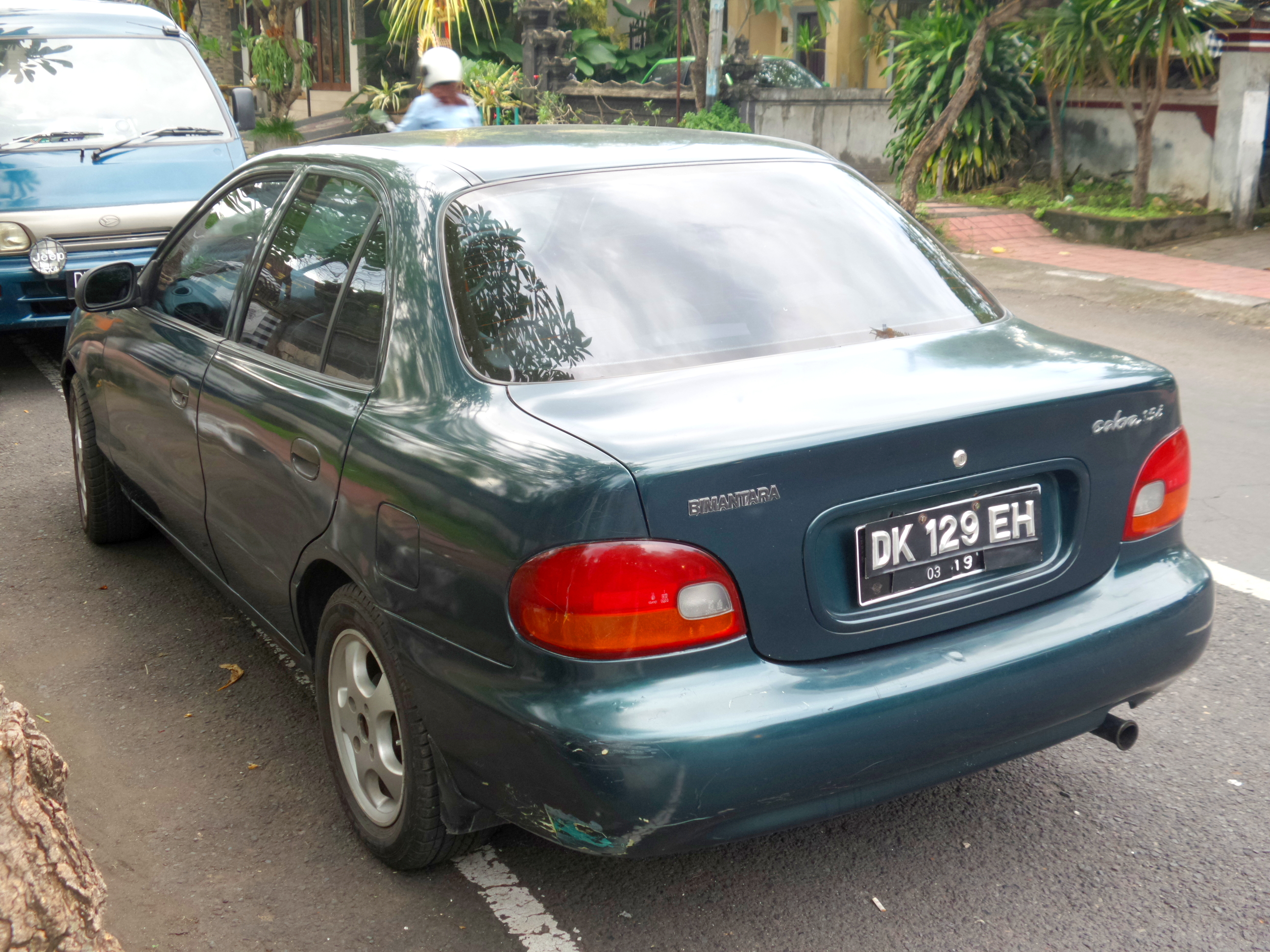
Rear view of Bimantara Cakra

In Indonesia, the Accent was assembled locally and marketed as the Bimantara Cakra from 1996 to 1998 (alongside the Bimantara Nenggala/Hyundai Elantra) and only available as a 4-door sedan and powered by a fuel injected 1.5-litre 12-valve engine, mated to a 5-speed manual transmission. After the 1997 Asian financial crisis that affected Indonesia in 1998, Bimantara went bankrupt and the production facilities were taken over by Hyundai (also the first time Hyundai started selling their cars with their own brand in Indonesia) and reintroduced the Cakra as Accent, still with the same 1.5-litre 12-valve engine but with the facelifted model and an additional 4-speed automatic transmission variant from 1998 to 2001. From 2001 to 2006, the sedan was sold together with the second generation Accent (sold as Hyundai Verna) but as Hyundai Excel, specially for taxi fleets.

==== China ====
In China, the Hyundai Excel was branded as the Kia Qianlima under Dongfeng Yueda Kia. It came with either a 1.3-litre SOHC engine or a 1.6-litre engine DOHC engine. Production ran from December 2002 until November 2006. It had similar styling to the regular Hyundai Excel until it was given a facelift in 2005 featuring a new grille and foglamps. Trim levels included the 1.3 DLX, 1.3L GL (Manual), 1.3L GL (Automatic), 1.6 GLS (Manual) and the 1.6 GLS (Automatic). The only body style available was the 4-door sedan.

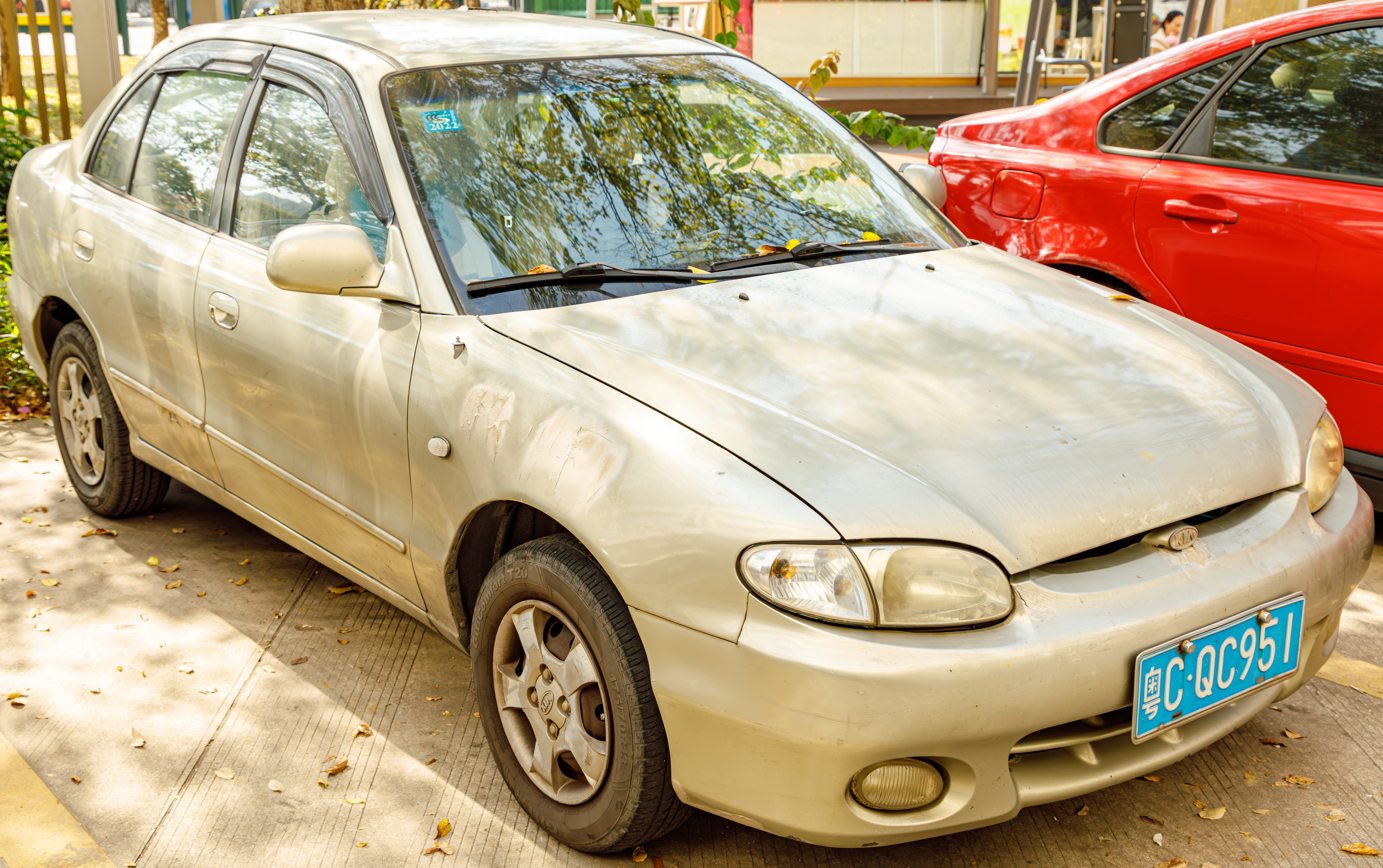

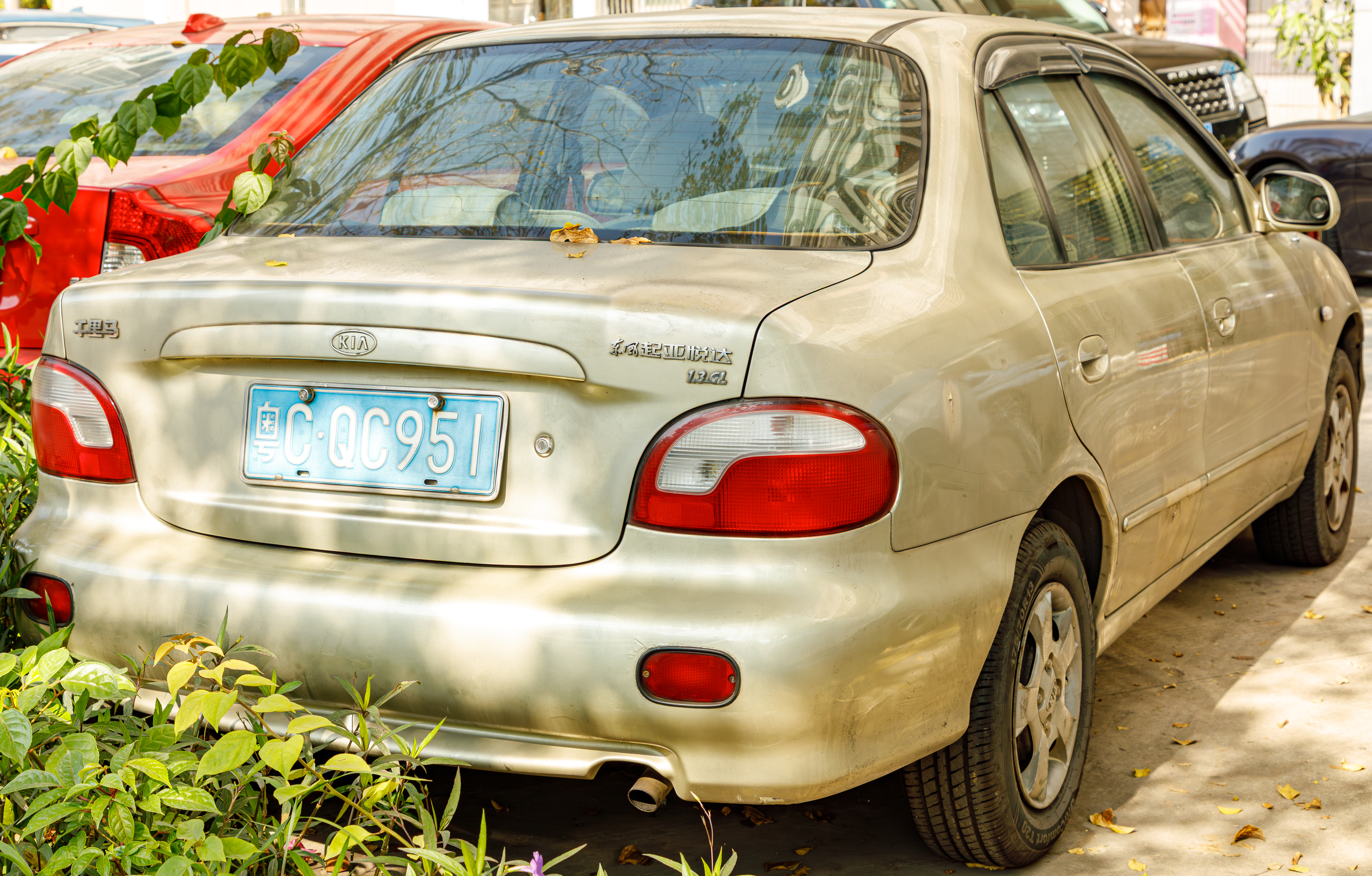
Kia Qianlima (pre-facelift)

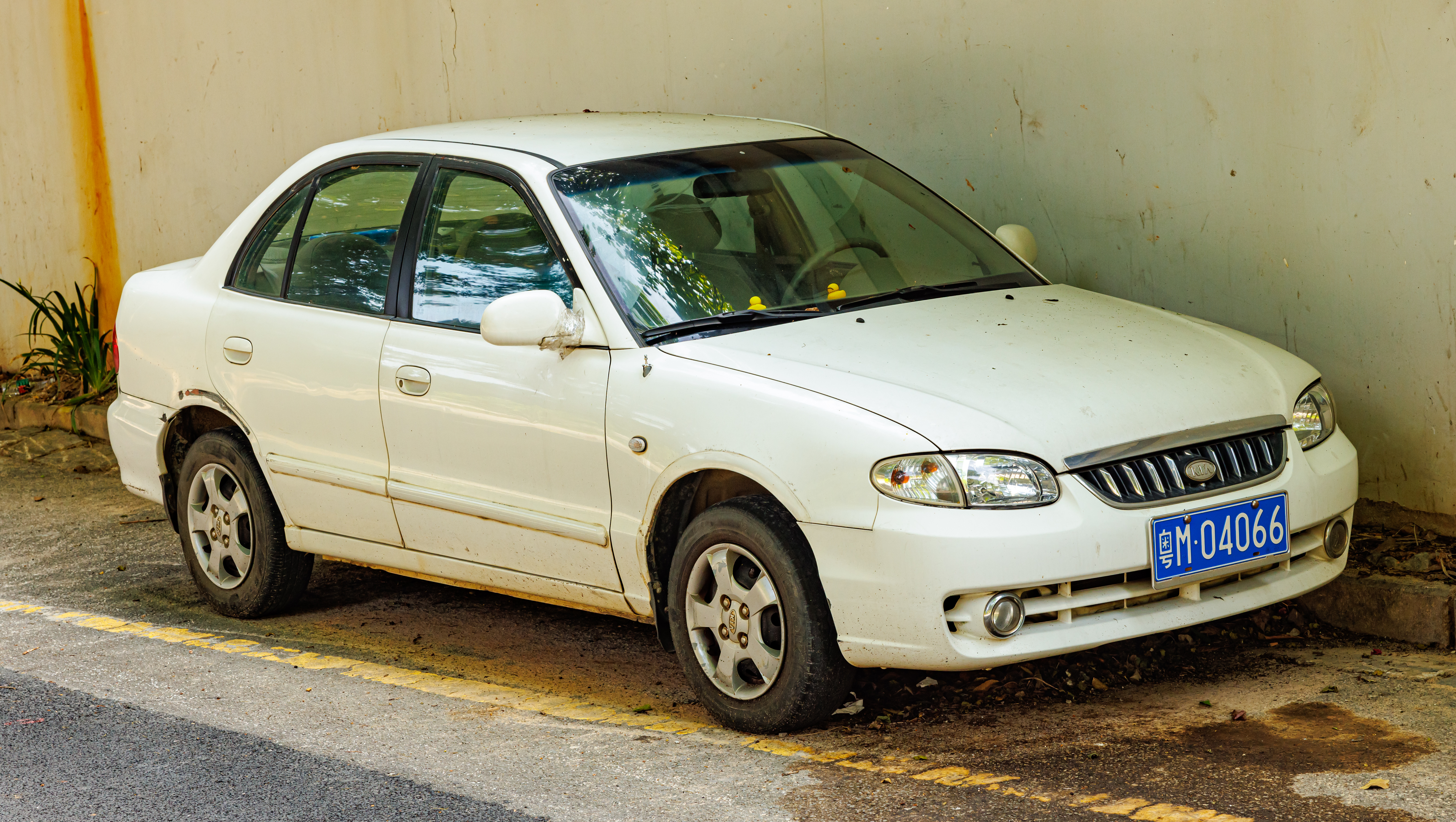

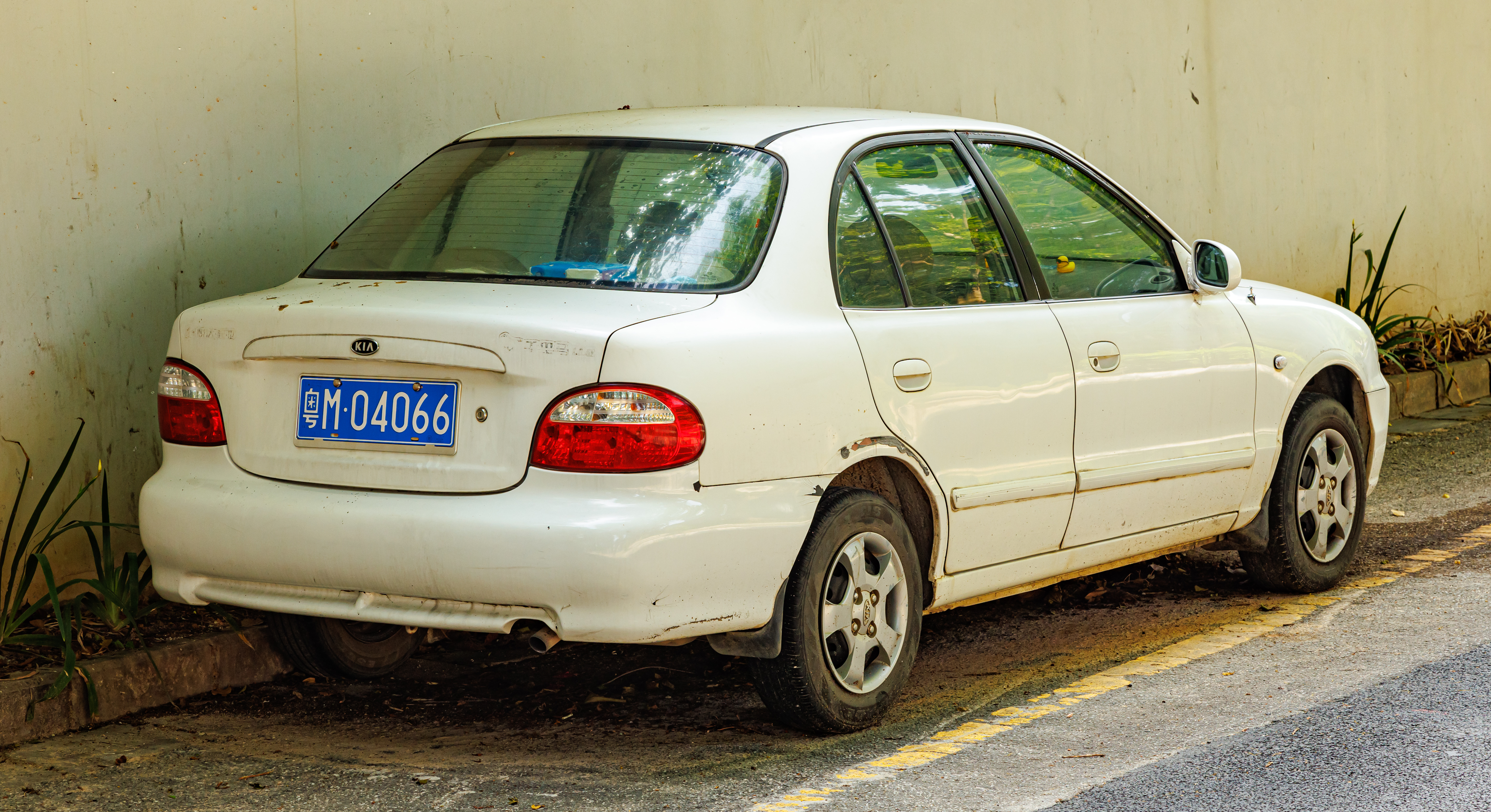
Kia Qianlima (facelift)

=== Safety ===
The 1998 Hyundai Accent was crash-tested by the European New Car Assessment Programme and showed rather poor performance, scoring only 4 points out of 16 for frontal impact, and receiving 2 stars for adult occupants and 2 stars for pedestrians. The passenger compartment became unstable in the crash test.It was determined that there was an unacceptably high risk of chest injury during side impact crash, as a result, the car would not meet the minimum legal requirement in 1999. The Swedish insurance company, Folksam, rates the 1st-gen Accent as one of the safest cars in its weight class.

== Second generation (LC; 1999) ==
Second generation
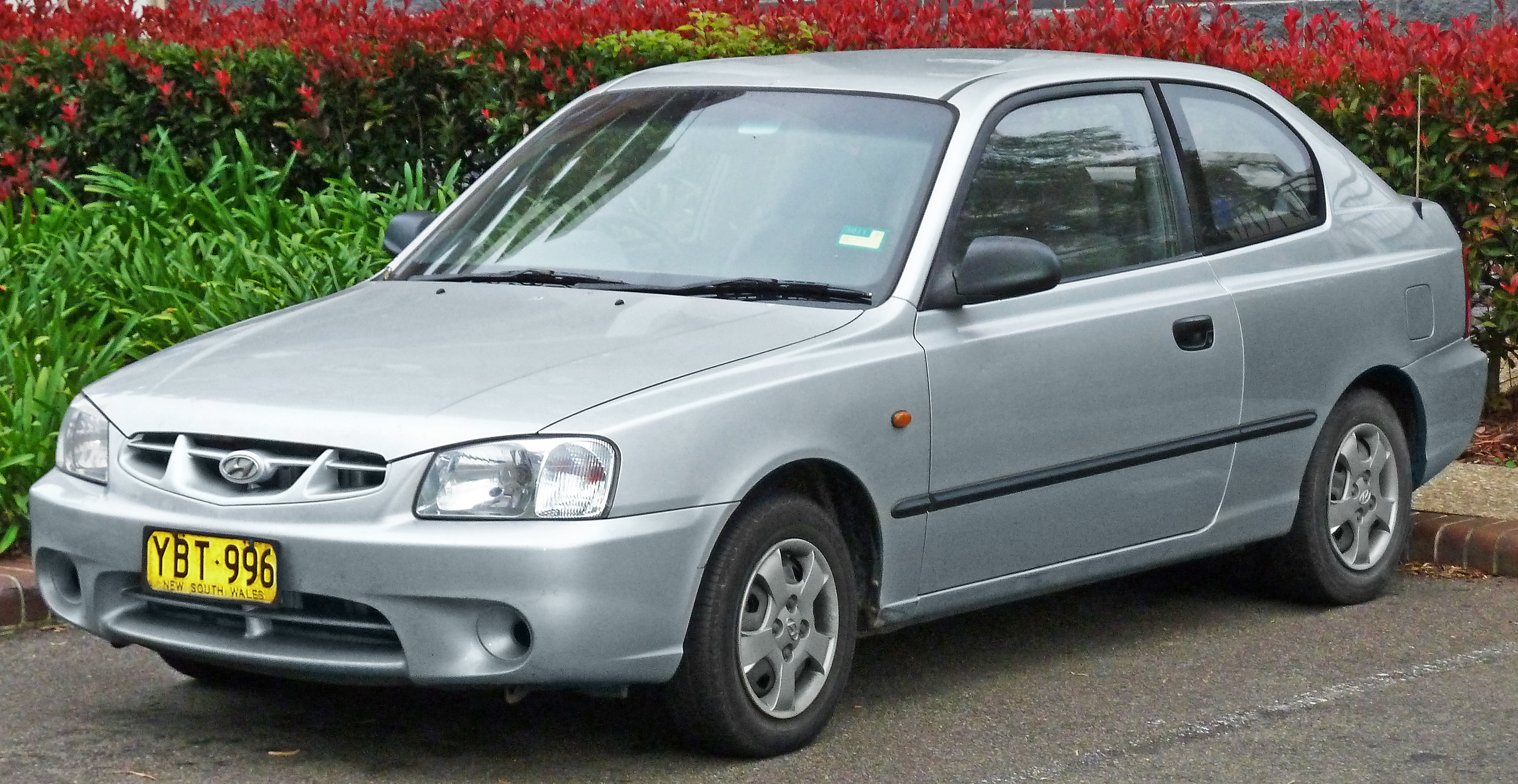
- Pre-facelift Hyundai Accent 3-door (Australia)

Overview
- Model code: LC
- Also called: Hyundai Verna; Hyundai Avega (liftback, Indonesia); Hyundai Excel II (taxi fleet, Indonesia); Hyundai Brio (Puerto Rico); Dodge Verna (Mexico)
- Production: 1999–2005 (South Korea); 1999–2016 (India); 2001–2012 (Russia); 2001–2012 (Indonesia); 2006–2019 (Egypt)
- Model years: 2000–2005 (North America); 2000–2006 (Liftback, Canada)
- Assembly: South Korea: Ulsan, South Korea; Malaysia: Johor Bahru (OSAB); India: Chennai (HMIL); Turkey: Alikahya, İzmit, Kocaeli Province (HAOS); Russia: Taganrog (TagAZ); Egypt: Cairo (Ghabbour Group); Sudan: Khartoum (Giad Auto); Iran: Kerman (RVMCO); Indonesia: Bekasi (HIM)

Body and chassis
- Body style: 4-door sedan 3- and 5-door liftback
- Platform: Hyundai-Kia TB
- Related: Hyundai Getz

Powertrain
- Engine: Petrol: 1.3 L Alpha 12V I4; 1.5 L Alpha 12V I4; 1.5 L Alpha II DOHC 16V I4; 1.6 L Alpha II DOHC 16V I4; Diesel: 1.5 L D 12V I3 CRDi turbo-diesel
- Transmission: 5-speed manual; 4-speed automatic

Dimensions
- Wheelbase: 2,440 mm (96.1 in)
- Length: 4,235 mm (166.7 in) (1999–02 sedan); 4,260 mm (167.7 in) (2002–05 sedan); 4,215 mm (165.9 in) (liftback)
- Width: 1,670 mm (65.7 in) (1999–02); 1,680 mm (66.1 in) (2002–05)
- Height: 1,395 mm (54.9 in)
- Curb weight: 990–1,140 kg (2,183–2,513 lb)

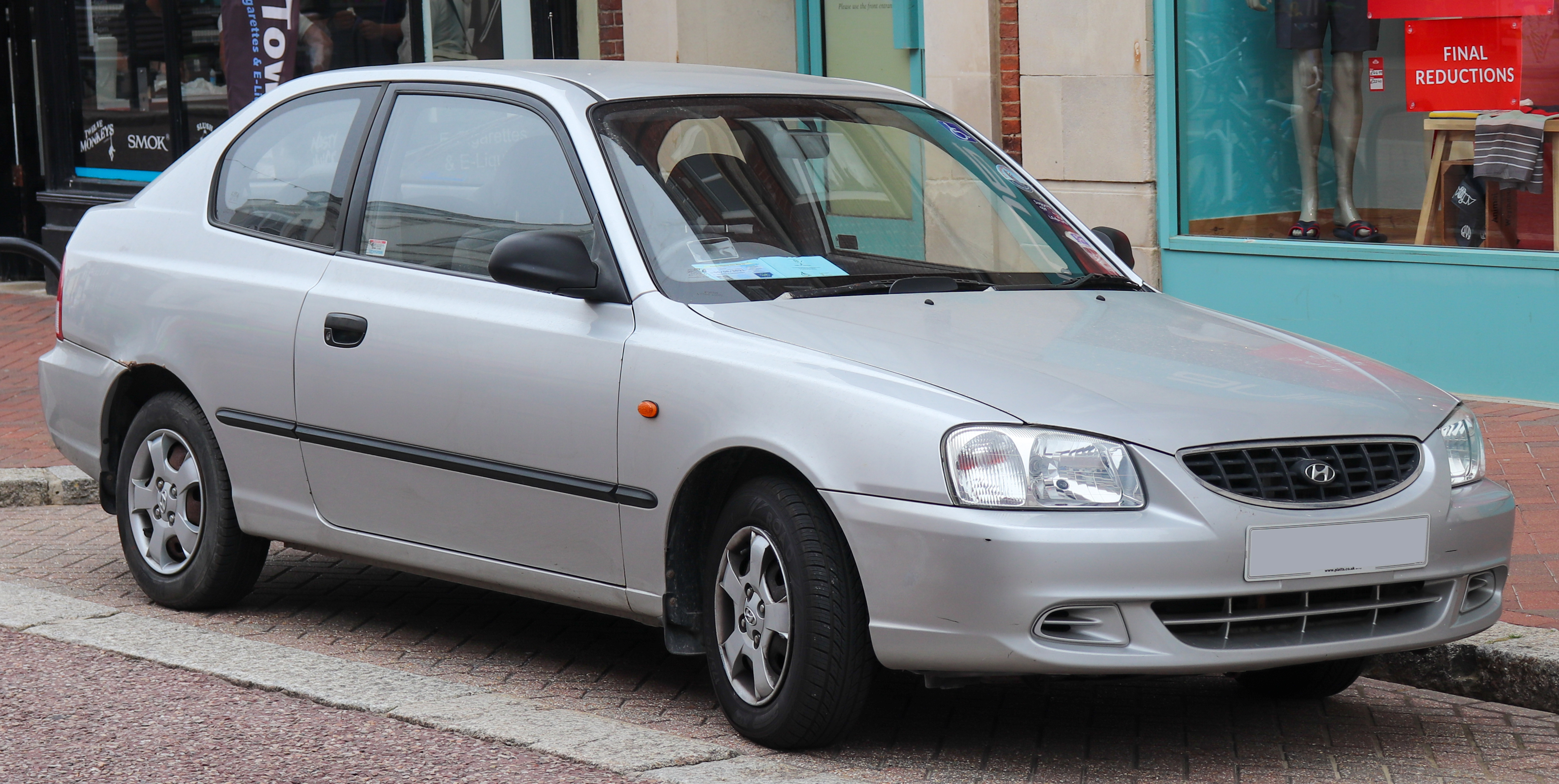

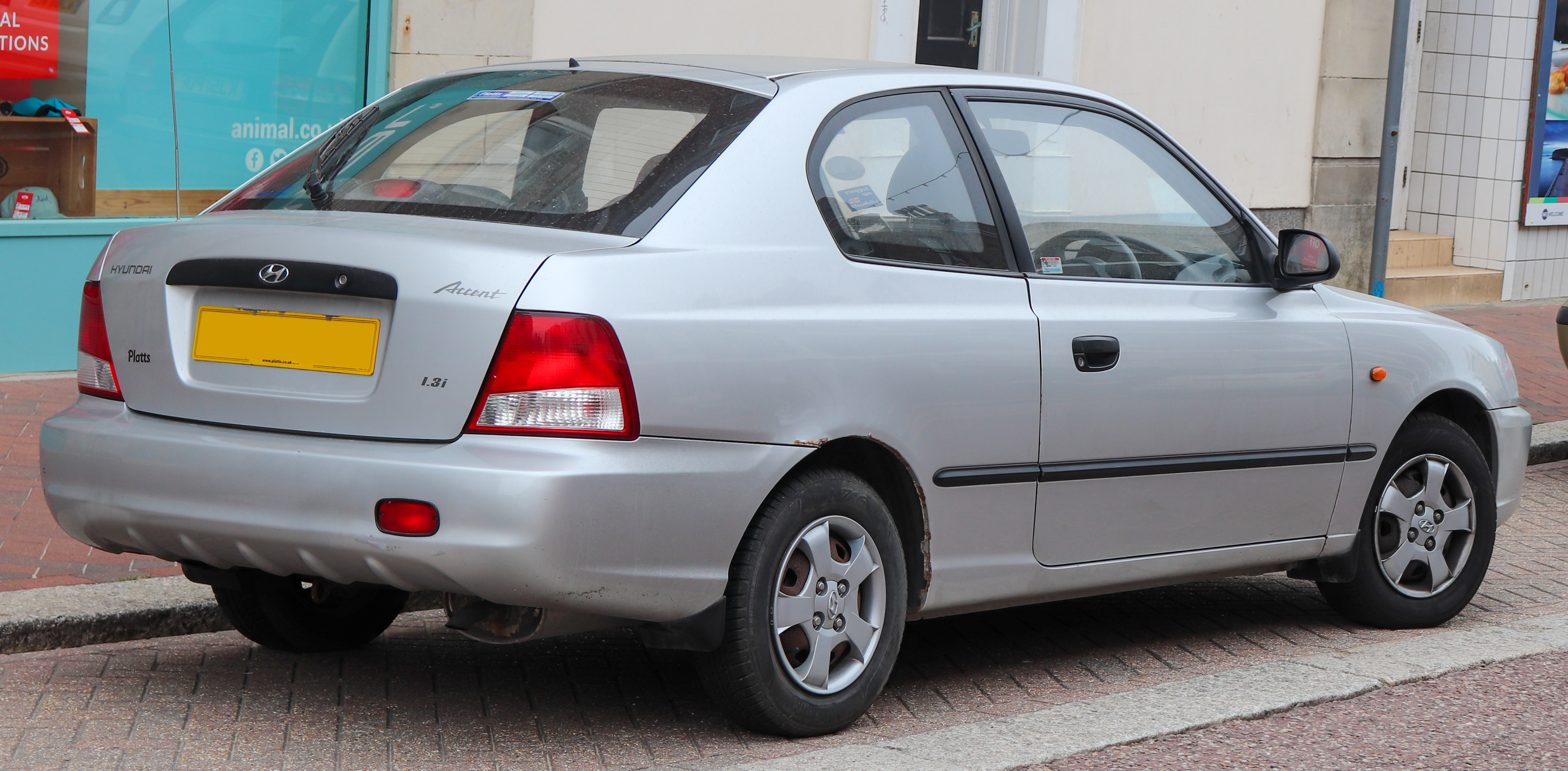
3-door liftback/coupe (UK; pre-facelift)

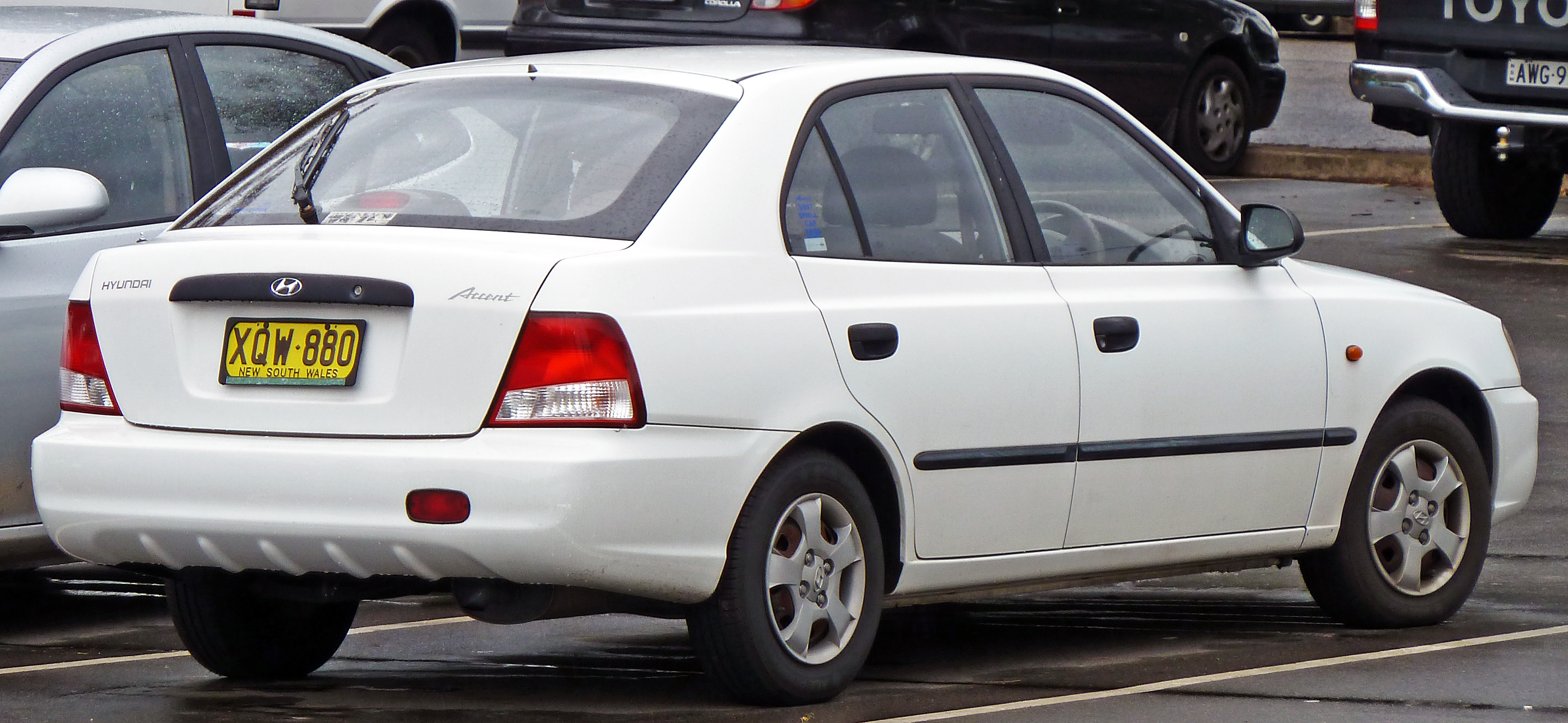
5-door liftback (pre-facelift)

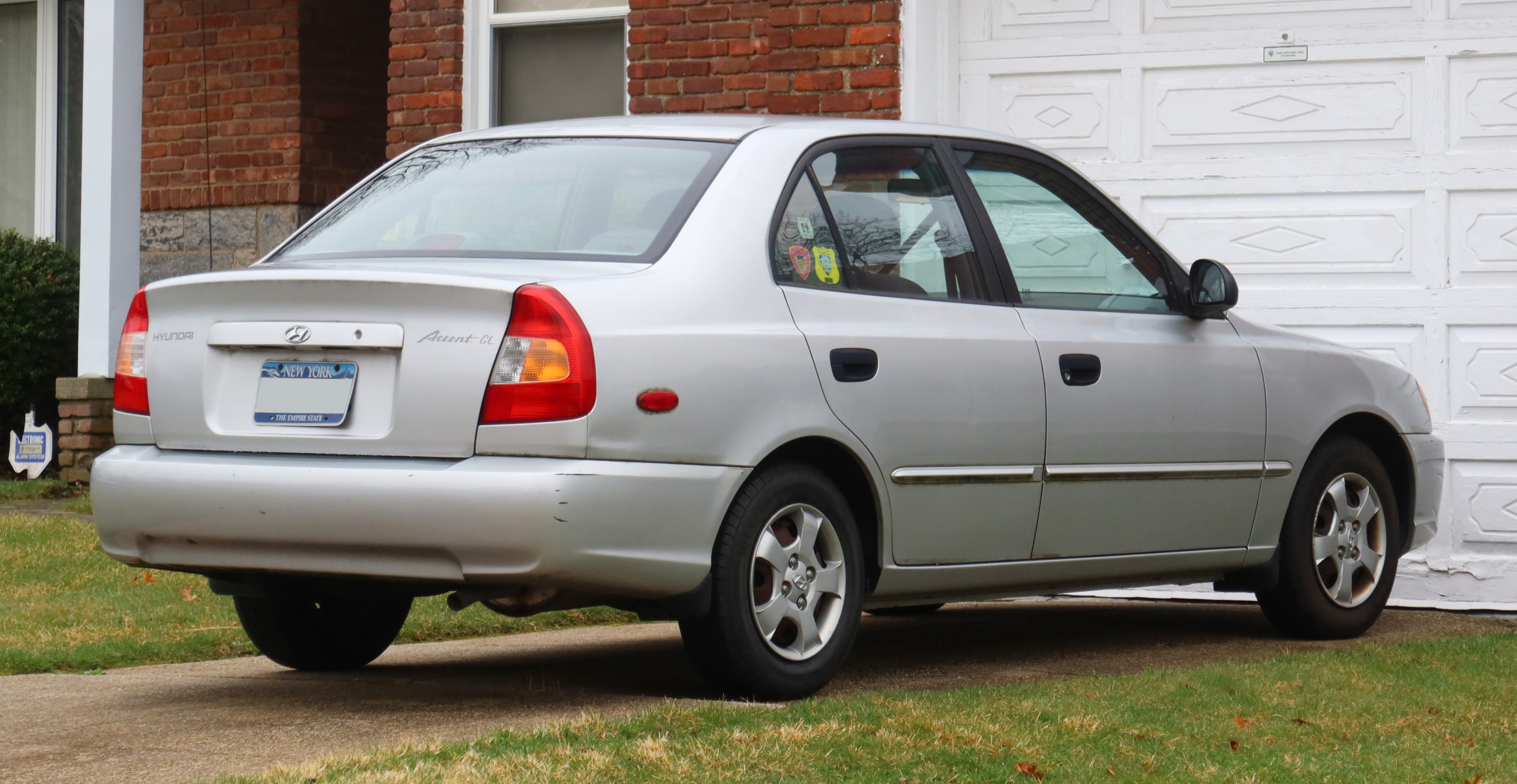
4-door sedan (pre-facelift)

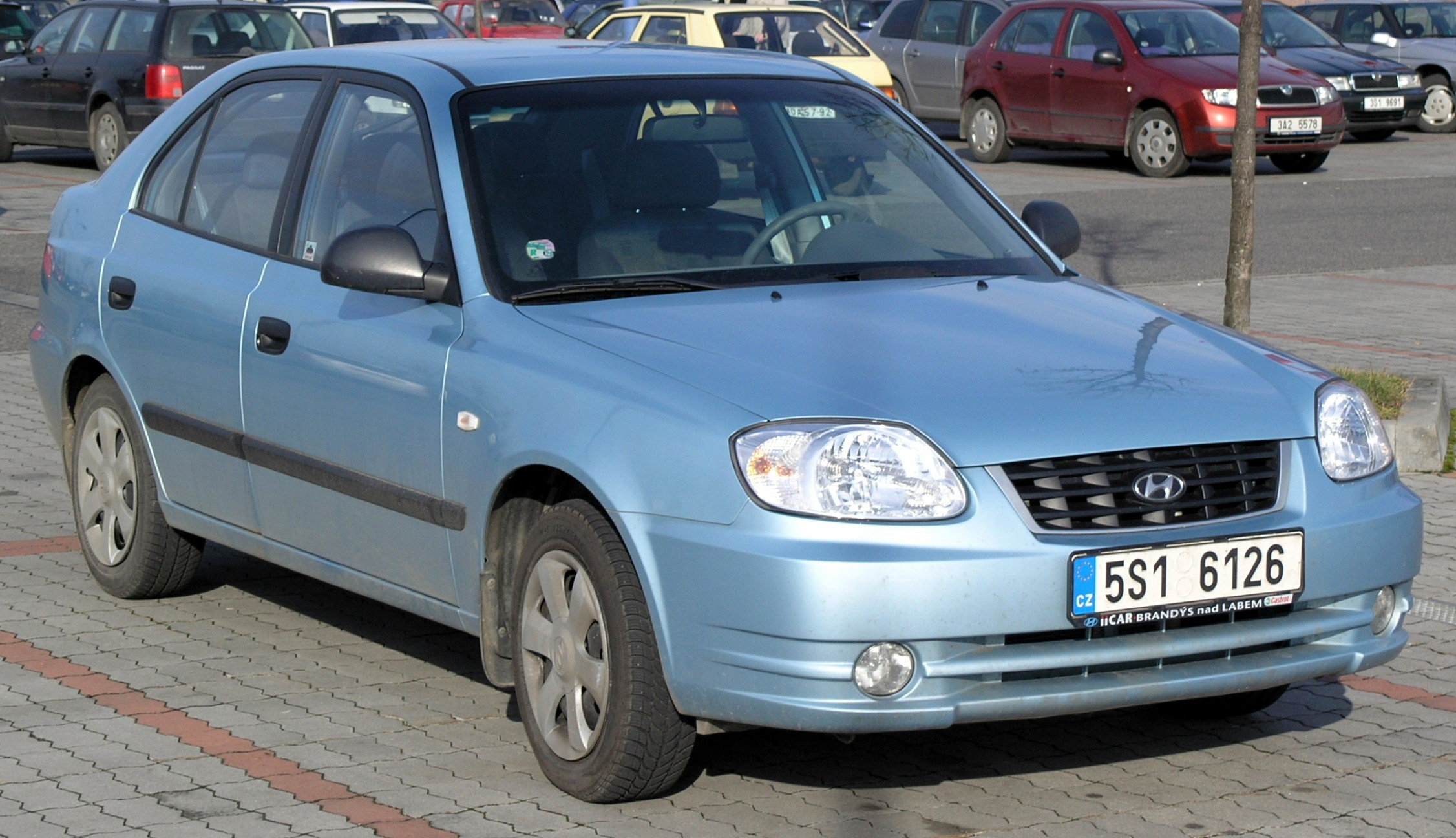

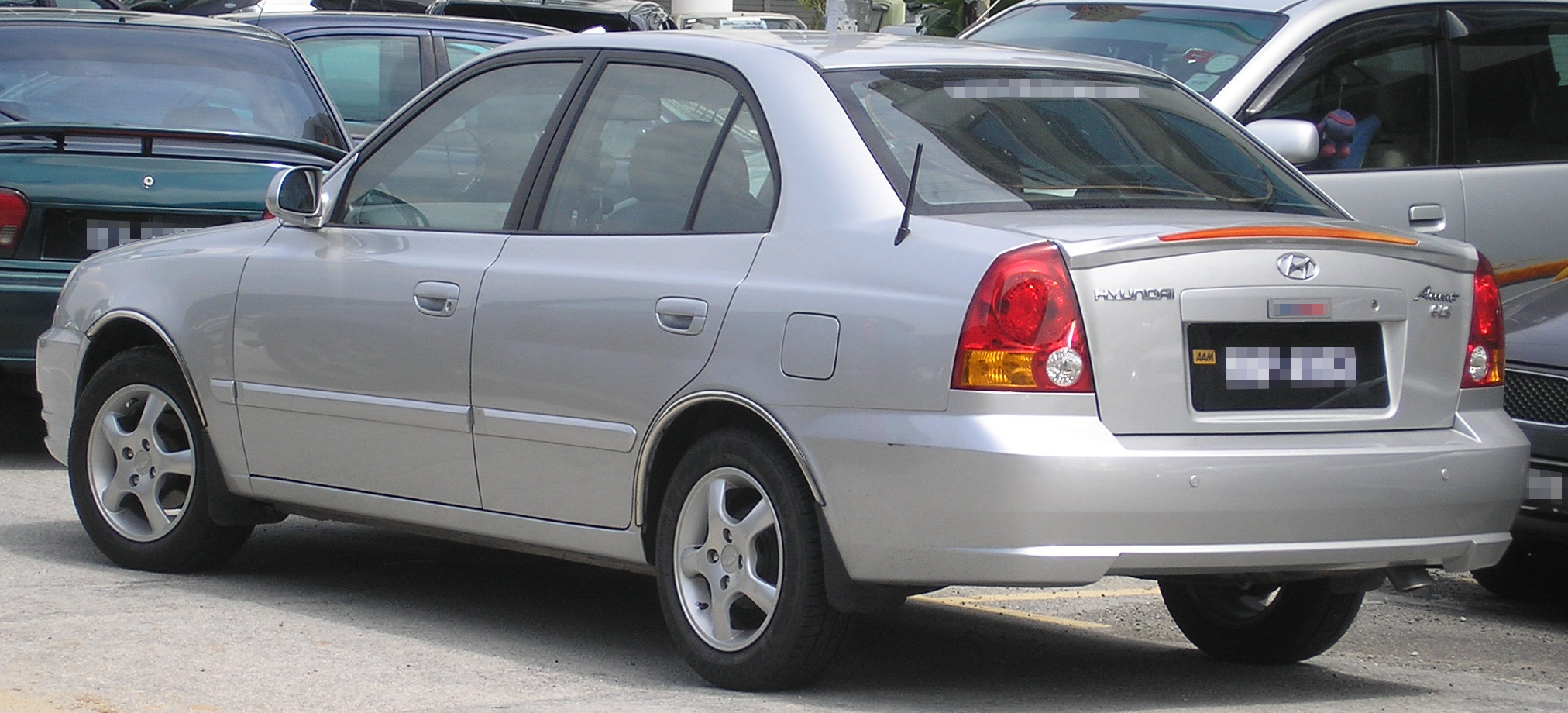
4-door sedan (facelift)

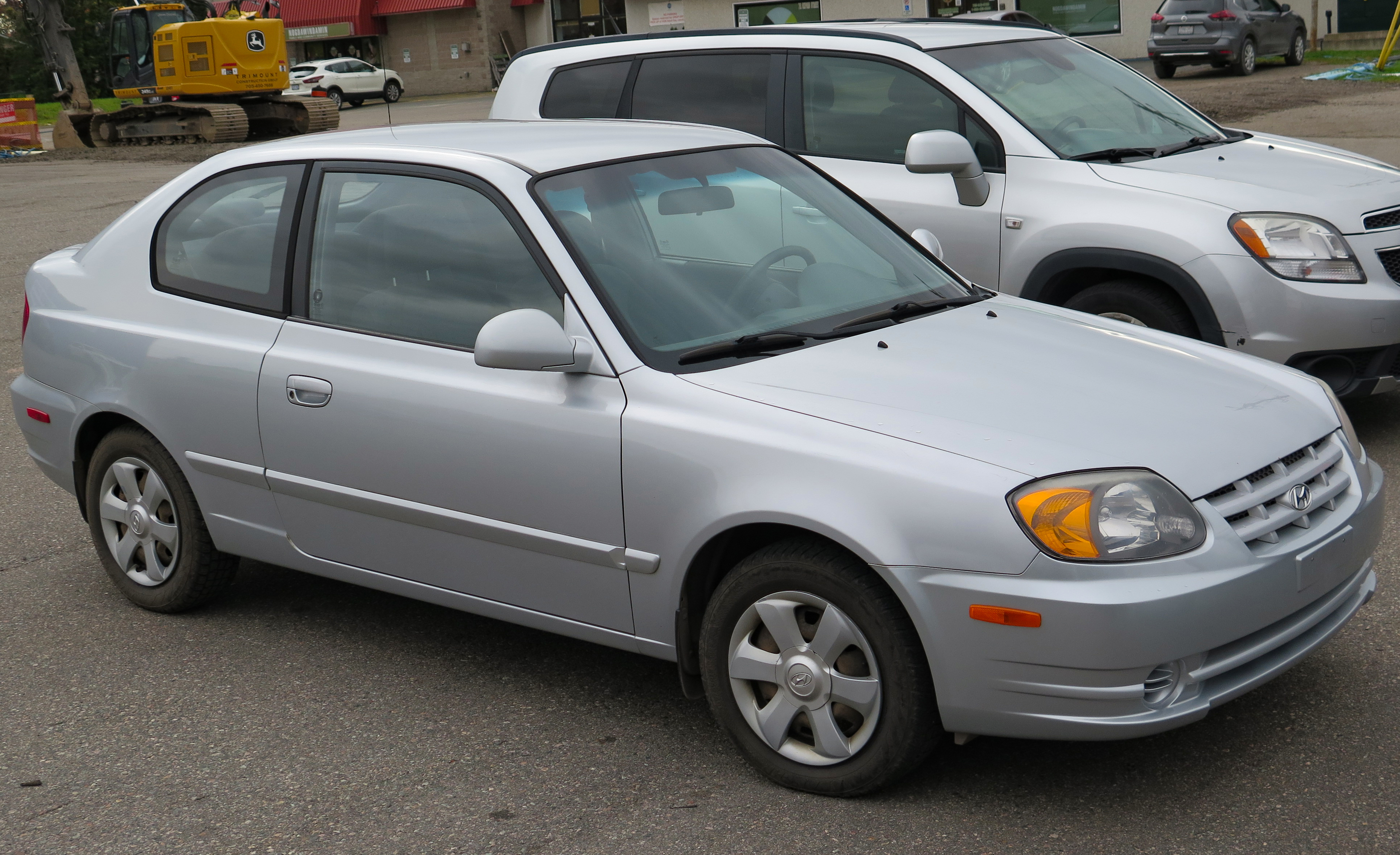

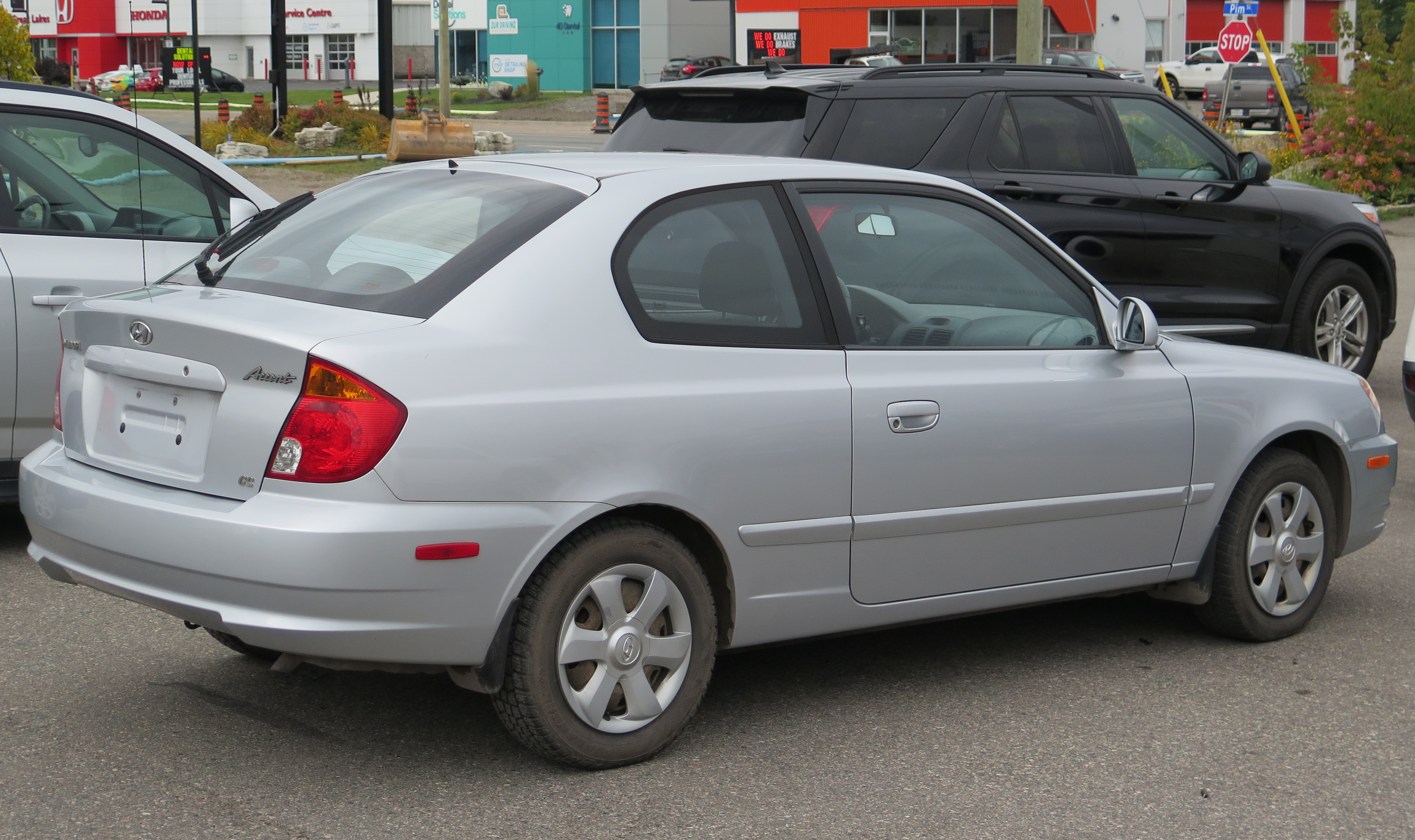
3-door liftback (facelift)

The redesigned 1999 Accent (LC) sported a more angular body and increased dimensions. It received a minor facelift in 2003, and was given the model code LC2. When the Accent sedan underwent a 2006 redesign, the liftback continued on sale during 2006 only in Canada, since the liftback skipped the 2006 model year for the United States. But for Korea, it was the first model with the new nameplate: Verna.

The Accent got revised 1.3 and 1.5-litre engines, featuring various improvements to lower noise, vibration, and harshness. A 1.6-litre DOHC 16-valve replaced the 1.5-litre from 2001, with the 1.5 continuing to be available in some markets. This Accent was also the first to get a diesel version, with a 1.5-litre three-cylinder direct injection turbodiesel with four valves per cylinder, which was badged CRDi.

Trim levels were GSi, CDX and MVi: this was standard on most export versions, although some European markets had their own designations with names like Dynamic Version etc. Some markets used LS and GLS.

=== Markets ===
==== North America ====
In North America, the Accent was available in GL, GLS and GT trim levels only, with the 1.5-litre engine at first, then the 1.6-litre engine from 2002. The GT version was similar to the MVi version marketed in Europe and Oceania, although the body kit was not as overtly hot hatch styled.

During 2003 in Canada, the liftback was offered as a GS or GSi with a 1.5 L or 1.6 L engine, respectively. In 2004 the GS trim was equipped with the 1.6 L engine.

==== Russia ====
It was sold in Russia until 2011 as the Hyundai Accent side-by-side with the third generation model which was sold as the Hyundai Solaris.

==== India ====
It was launched in India in October 1999 as the "Accent" and was still in production after some minor facelifts;the car was phased out in 2013 for local market. It has been restyled twice – in 2004 and 2010 – and is mated with a 1.5-litre four-cylinder petrol engine matched to a five-speed manual gearbox.

==== Egypt ====
In Egypt, it still remains on sale as of January 2019.

==== Indonesia ====
In Indonesia, it was sold from 2001 to 2012 and marketed under three different names. At first it was marketed in a 4-door body style as "Accent Verna" (2001–2007), available with three trim levels, G, GL and GLS. In 2005, a facelifted version based from G trim was sold for taxi fleet as "Excel II". Later from 2007, both the Accent Verna and Excel II 4-door sedans were replaced with a 5-door liftback body style, sold until 2012 as the "Avega."

=== Engines ===
Model	Power	Torque	0–100 km/h (62 mph)	Top speed
Petrol
1.3 L 12-valve SOHC Alpha I4	82 hp (61 kW)			
1.3 L 12-valve SOHC Alpha I4	86 hp (64 kW)			
1.5 L 12-valve SOHC Alpha I4	92 hp (69 kW) @5500 rpm	97 lb⋅ft (132 N⋅m) @2900 rpm	12.0 sec	181 km/h (112 mph)
1.5 L 16-valve DOHC Alpha I4	102 hp (76 kW)	98 lb⋅ft (133 N⋅m)	11.6 sec	185 km/h (115 mph)
1.6 L 16-valve DOHC Alpha I4	106 hp (79 kW)	106 lb⋅ft (144 N⋅m)	10.9 sec	189 km/h (117 mph)
Diesel
1.5 L CRDi (R 315) I3	82 hp (61 kW)	137 lb⋅ft (186 N⋅m)	14.0 sec	170 km/h (106 mph)

From 2003 to 2005, cars equipped with the 1.3 L engine and air conditioning are rated at 82 hp (61 kW) rather than being uprated to 86 hp (64 kW).

=== Safety ===
A pre-2003 model (a three-door liftback) was crash tested by Australian Australasian New Car Assessment Program (ANCAP) under the rules as adopted by Euro NCAP. It scored 10.76 out of 16 points for frontal offset impact and 10.96 out of 16 in the side impact test.

The same un-restyled model, a four-door sedan had been crash tested by Russian magazine Autoreview in 2005. Test was carried out to the Euro NCAP regulations. Despite the lack of airbags (which are not available in the cheapest version of Accent on the Russian market) it scored 9.9 of 16 for frontal impact.

The 2003 restyled model was tested by ANCAP as well. The three-door liftback scored 9.19 of 16 points for frontal impact and 9.76 out of 16 in the side impact crash test.

ANCAP test results* Hyundai Accent 3 door hatch (2003)
Test	Score
Overall	3 /5 stars
Frontal offset	9.19/16
Side impact	9.76/16
Pole	Not Assessed
Seat belt reminders	0/3
Whiplash protection	Not Assessed
Pedestrian protection	Poor
Electronic stability control	Not Assessed

== Third generation (MC; 2005) ==
Third generation
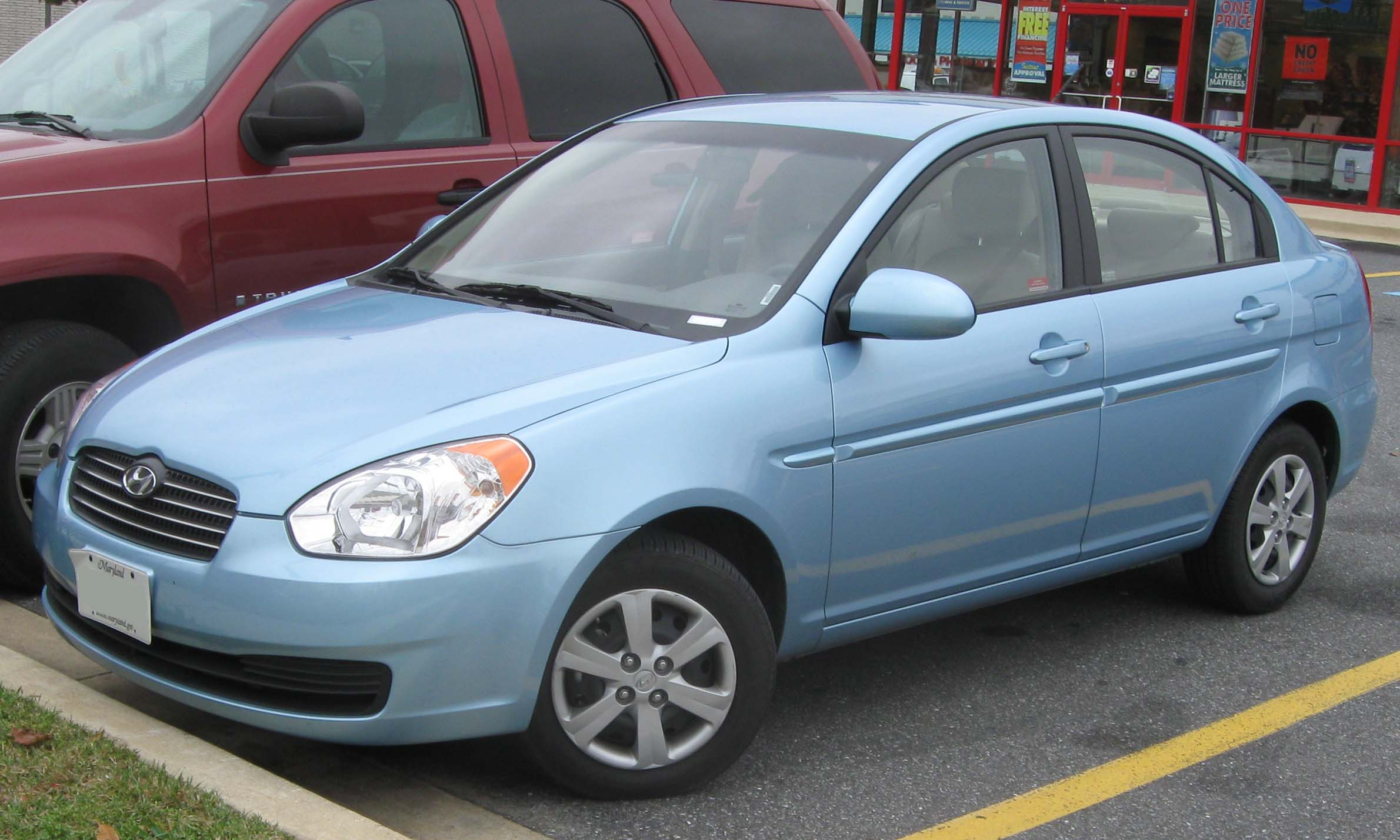

Overview
- Model code: MC
- Also called: Hyundai Verna; Hyundai Solaris (Russia); Hyundai Brio (Puerto Rico); Dodge Attitude (Mexico)
- Production: 2005–2010 (South Korea); 2006–2010 (China); 2006–2011 (India); 2006–2012 (Turkey)
- Model years: 2006–2011 (North America); 2006–2012 (China)
- Assembly: South Korea: Ulsan; China: Beijing (Beijing Hyundai); India: Chennai (HMIL); Malaysia: Kulim (Inokom); Turkey: Alikahy, İzmit, Kocaeli Province (HAOS); Ukraine: Cherkasy (Bogdan Motors)

Body and chassis
- Body style: 4-door sedan 3-door hatchback
- Related: Kia Rio (JB)

Powertrain
- Engine: Petrol: 1.4 L Alpha II I4; 1.6 L Alpha II I4; Diesel: 1.5 L U I4
- Transmission: 5-speed manual; 4-speed automatic

Dimensions
- Wheelbase: 2,500 mm (98.4 in)
- Length: 4,045 mm (159.3 in) (hatchback); 4,280 mm (168.5 in) (sedan); 4,300 mm (169.3 in) (Verna Transform and 2006–2009 Chinese variants); 4,310 mm (169.7 in) (2011 Chinese variants)
- Width: 1,695 mm (66.7 in)
- Height: 1,470–1,480 mm (57.9–58.3 in)
- Curb weight: 2,366–2,533 lb (1,073–1,149 kg)

Chronology
- Successor: Hyundai i20 (Europe)

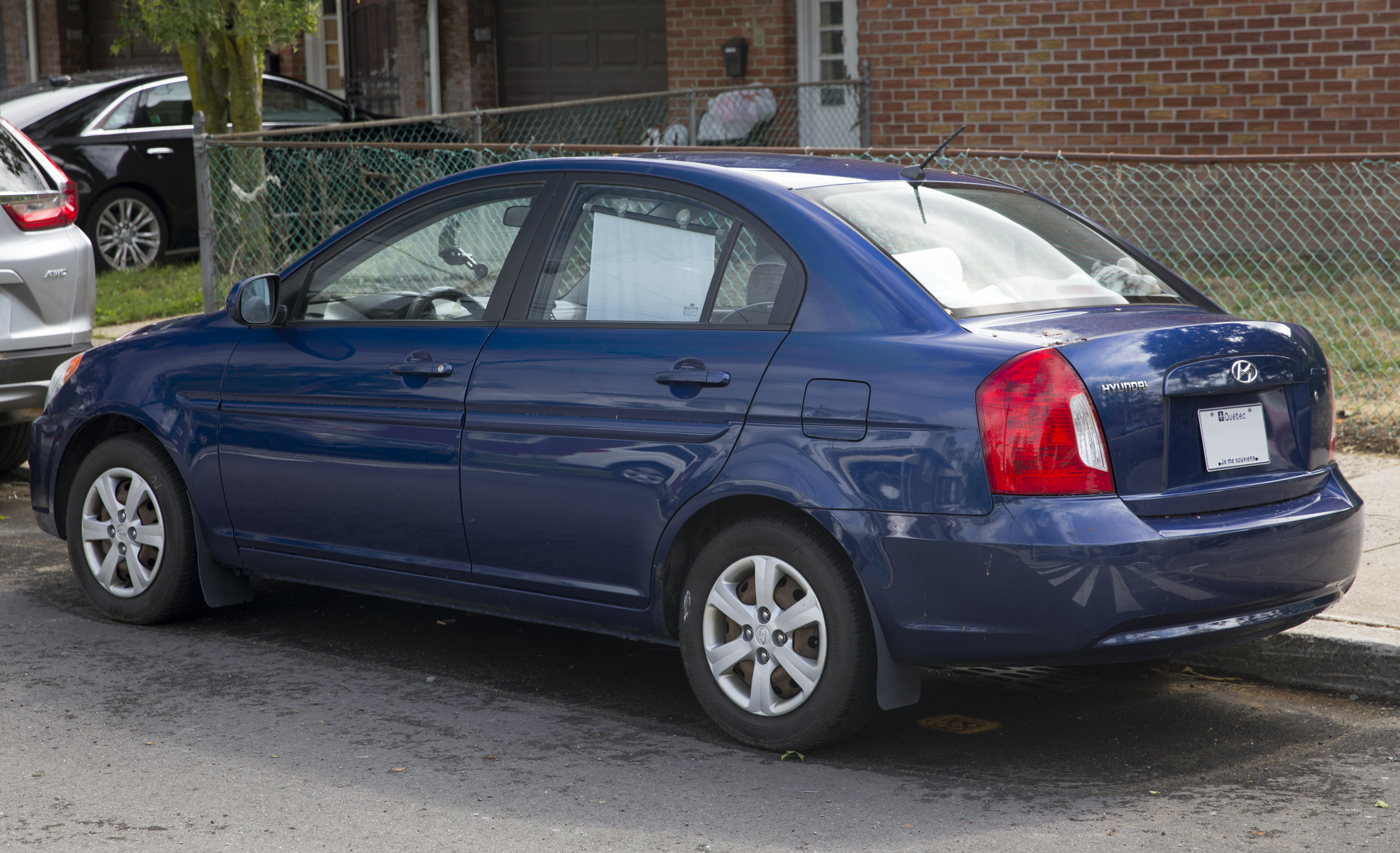
Sedan

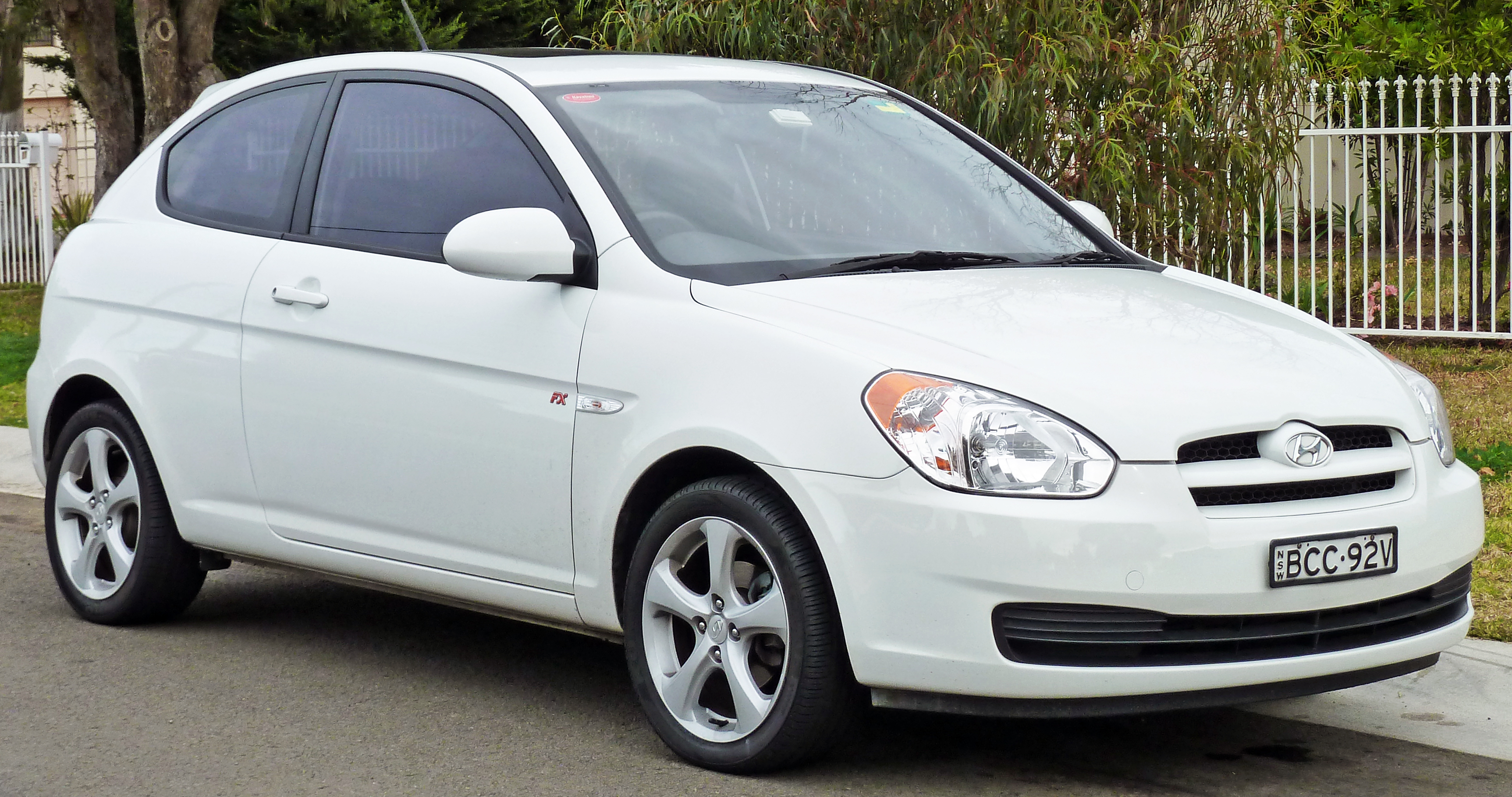

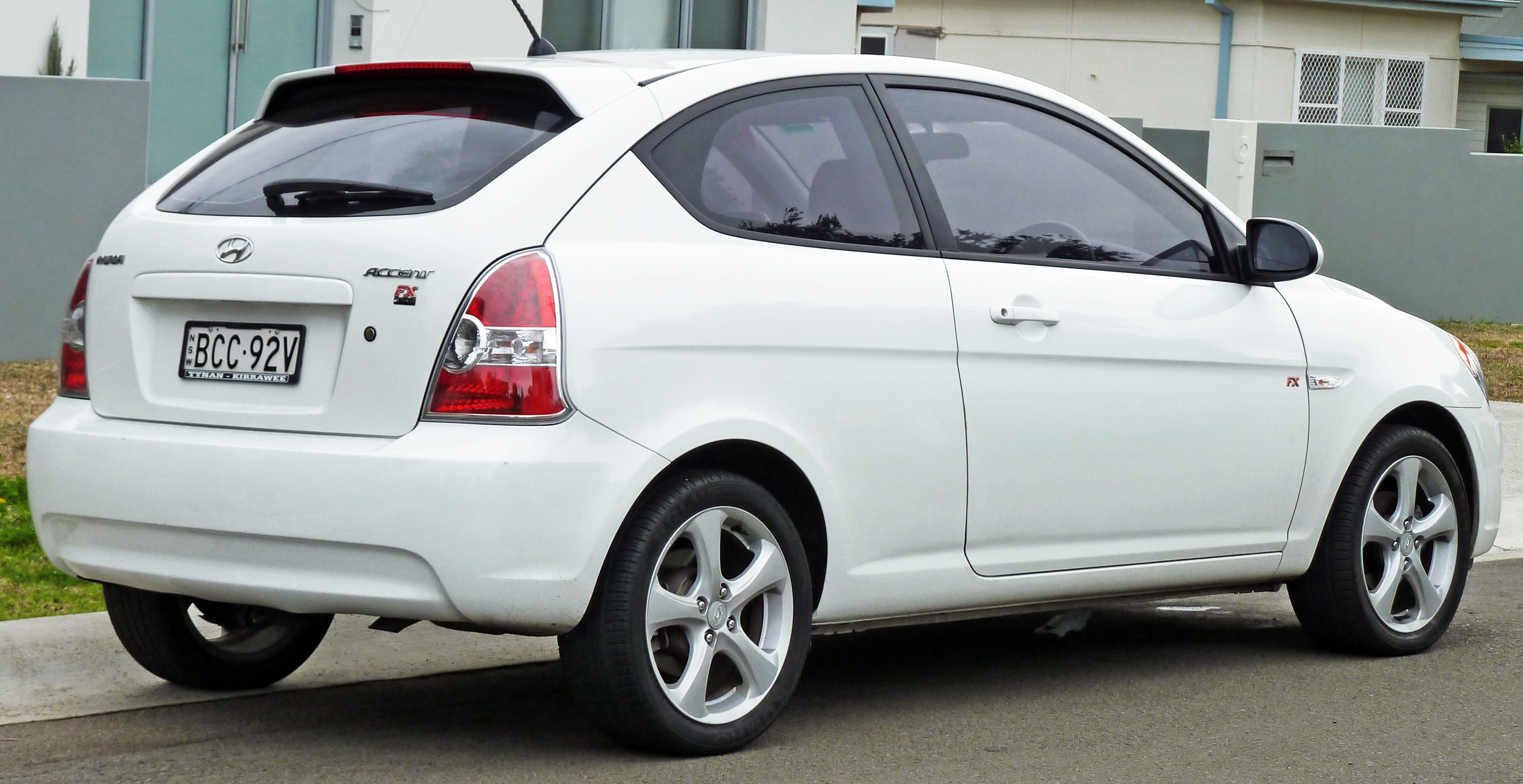
Hatchback

Hyundai introduced a new-generation Accent (MC) at the 2005 New York International Auto Show. A new exterior, larger interior, and CVVT engine are the notable features.

A single trim level, GLS, was available in the US for the sedan. Hyundai began selling the 3-door hatchback in the United States during the spring 2006 as a 2007 model year vehicle. The 3-door was available in two trims – GS and SE. In 2010, Forbes named the Accent amongst the ten worst cars for depreciation.

In Europe, this model was heavily promoted by the motoring press, and even Hyundai themselves, as a "stopgap" model – that it was intended merely to plug the gap in Hyundai's range until a brand new small family car was launched in 2007. The new car, the Hyundai i30, replaced both the Accent and the larger Hyundai Elantra. The name change helped to distance the new model from the budget reputation of the Accent, and also to position the car in the small family hatchback sector – something the Accent was slightly too small to do, and the Elantra too large. The Accent continued to be sold in the U.S. in 2008 with an instrument panel overhaul and standard rear cupholders in the SE model.

In 2008, Hyundai Accent received the lowest number of problems per 100 vehicles among compact multi-activity vehicles in the proprietary J.D. Power and Associates 2008 Vehicle Dependability Study. The study was based on responses from over 52,000 original owners of 2005 model year vehicles, measuring more than 250 models across several brands. The proprietary study's results are based on experiences and perceptions of owners surveyed in January to April 2008.

Production in Egypt continued until 2026.

Engines
Model	Power	Torque
Petrol
1.4 L Alpha I4	97.3 PS (72 kW; 96 hp)	127 N⋅m (94 lb⋅ft)
1.6 L CVVT Alpha II I4	112 PS (82 kW; 110 hp)	145 N⋅m (107 lb⋅ft)
Diesel
1.5 L D I4 turbo-diesel CRDi VGT	110 PS (81 kW; 108 hp)	235 N⋅m (173 lb⋅ft)

=== Markets ===
==== Mexico ====
In Mexico, it was marketed as the Dodge Attitude: trim levels are 1.4 GL and 1.6 GLS. Hyundai had no official representation in Mexico, so select Hyundai models were rebranded as Dodges under an agreement with Chrysler's Mexican division.

==== India ====
In India, it was marketed as Hyundai Verna. The previous generation remained in production alongside as a cheaper alternative, marketed as the Hyundai Accent.

==== Egypt ====
In Egypt, this generation was sold as the Hyundai New Accent (1.6 GLS only), and the previous model was still locally produced and sold as the Hyundai Verna (1.6 GL and GLS trims).

==== Philippines ====
In the Philippines, the third generation (MC sedan) was introduced and made available in 2006 exclusively with a 1.5-L D4FA common rail direct injection (CRDi) turbodiesel with VGT with 110 hp (82 kW; 112 PS) and 240 N⋅m (177 lb⋅ft) with a 5-speed manual transmission. A number of units saw action in the taxi industry because of its fuel efficiency coupled with cheaper diesel fuel costs.

=== Safety ===
In 2006, according to the Insurance Institute for Highway Safety, the Accent received an Acceptable overall score in the frontal crash test and a Poor overall score for in the side impact test without its optional side airbags. It didn't perform well even when equipped with side airbags, performance of the car's structure is marginal there would likely be injuries to internal organs, ribs and pelvis. In 2007, 2006 year model of Hyundai Accent had been tested by ANCAP in June 2007. It scored 3 star in the Occupant Protection, and 2 star in Pedestrian Protection Rating.

IIHS 2009 Hyundai Accent scores:
Moderate overlap front	Acceptable
Side	Poor
Roof strength	Acceptable
Head restraints & seats	Poor

ANCAP test results* Hyundai Accent variants with dual frontal airbags (2007)
Test	Score
Overall	3 /5 stars
Frontal offset	9.37/16
Side impact	10.85/16
Pole	Not Assessed
Seat belt reminders	1/3
Whiplash protection	Not Assessed
Pedestrian protection	Marginal
Electronic stability control	Not Available

=== Gallery ===
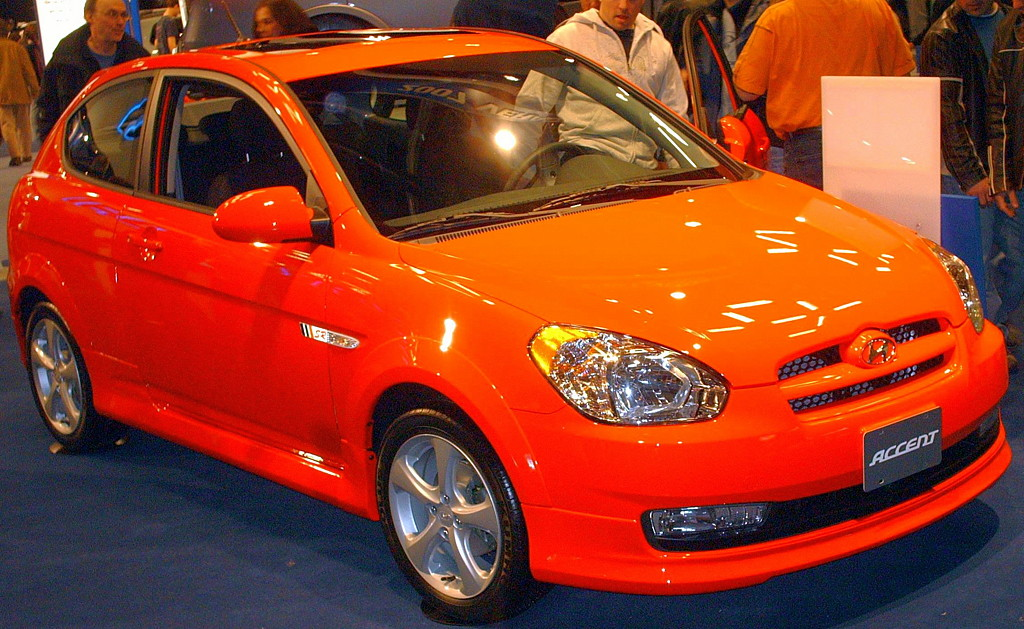
Hyundai Accent SR (sold only in Canada for 2007)

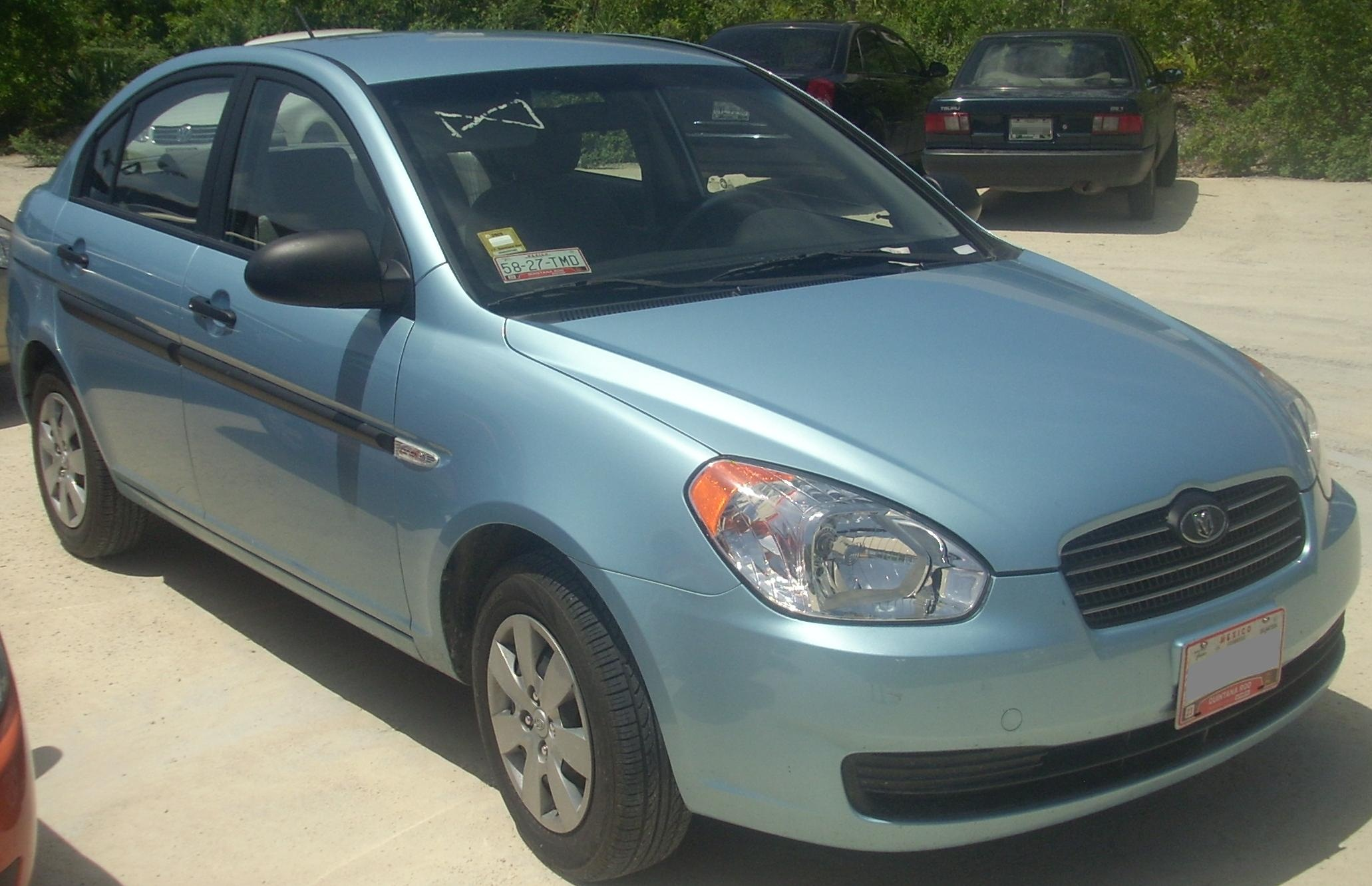
2007–2009 Dodge Attitude (Mexico)

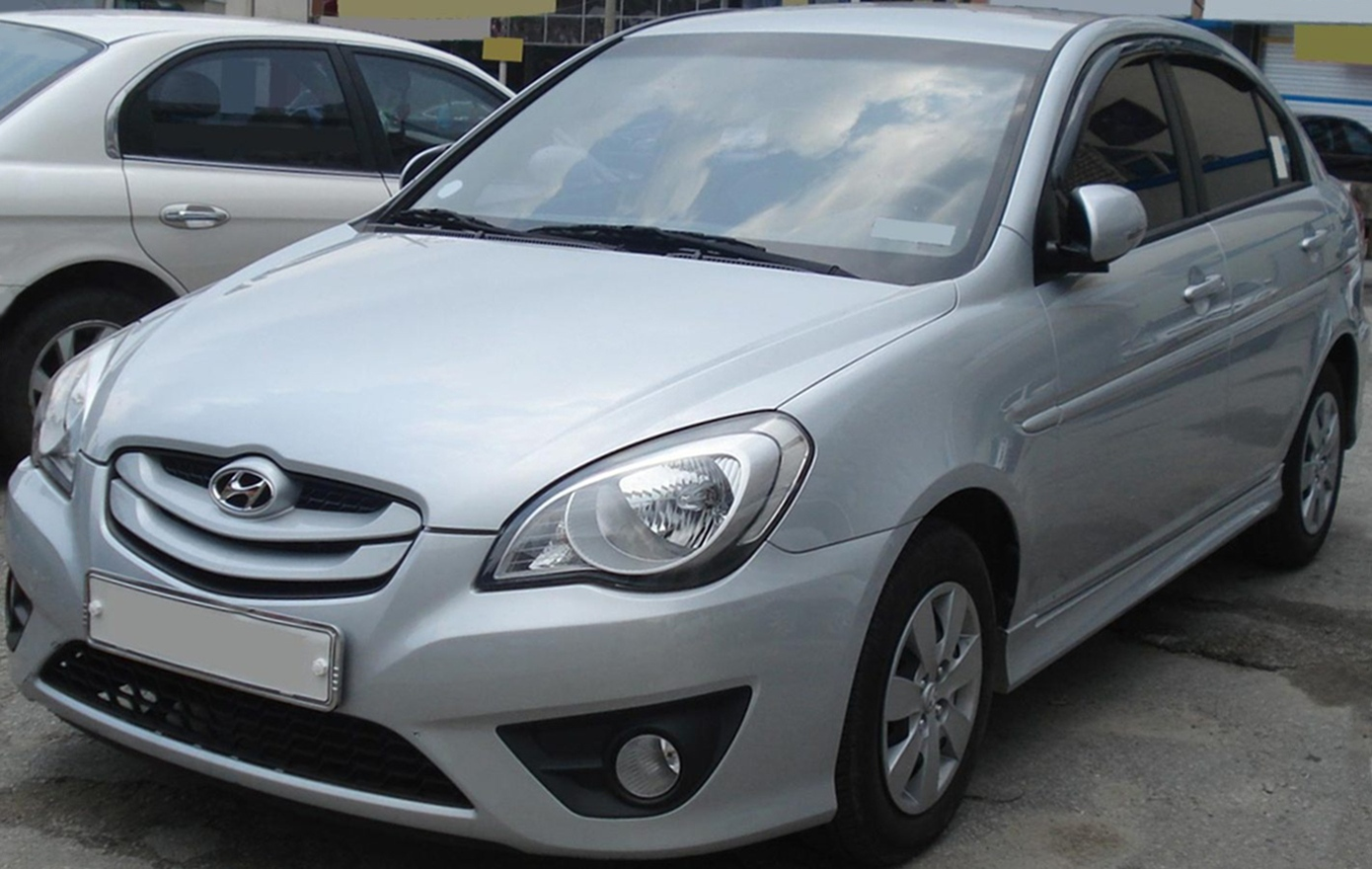
Hyundai Verna Transform (South Korea)

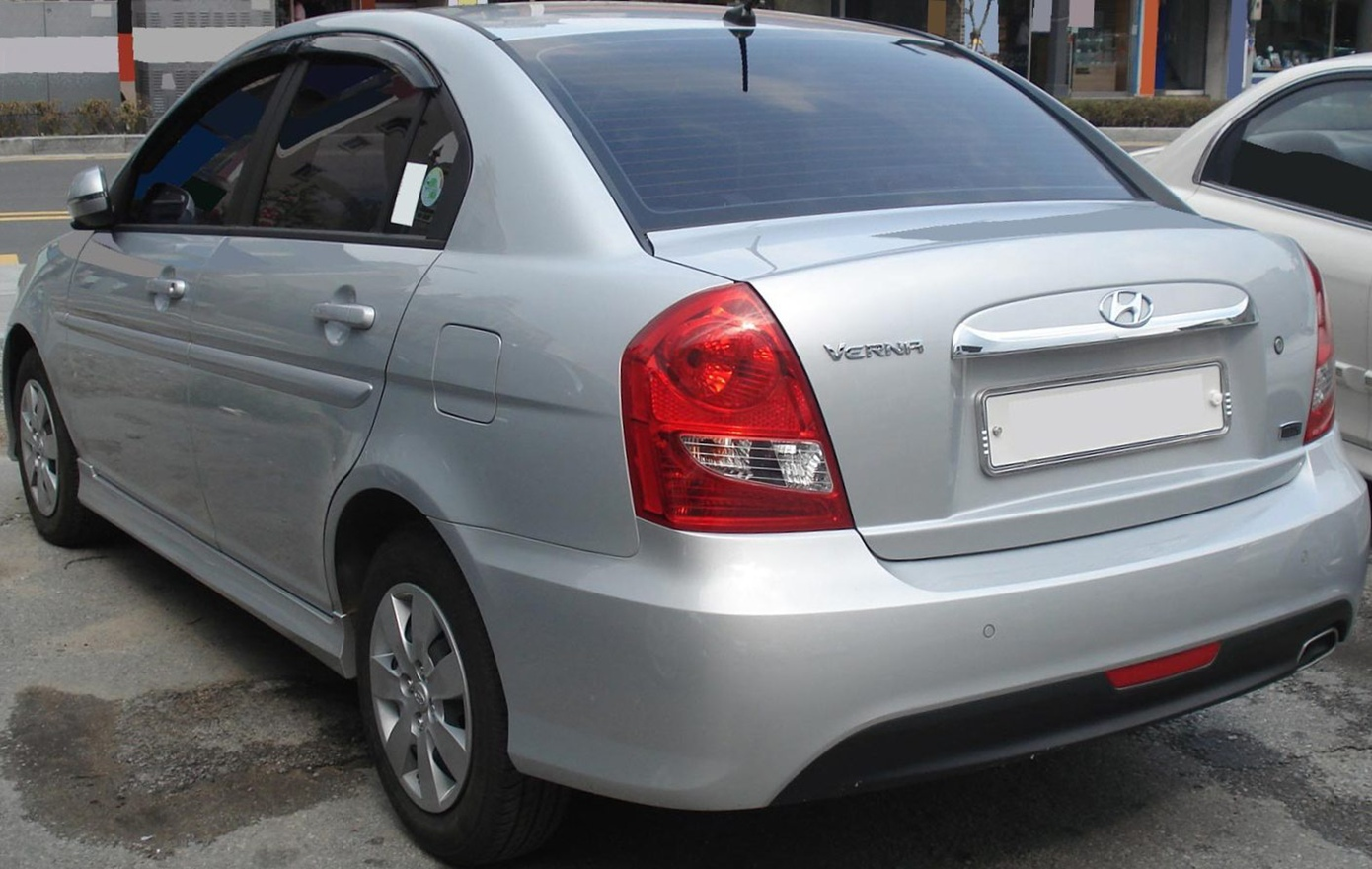
Hyundai Verna Transform (South Korea)

=== Hybrid ===
Hyundai debuted a demonstration version of a hybrid (MC/JB) Accent at the 2005 Guangzhou International Automobile Exhibition in Guangzhou, China. It uses a 90 hp (67 kW; 91 PS) 1.4 L engine with continuously variable valve timing and a 12 kW (16 hp; 16 PS) electric motor to achieve 44% better fuel economy. Though originally scheduled for production release in the 2006 model year, introduction of the production version has been delayed indefinitely, along with the Kia Rio hybrid.

== Fourth generation (RB/RC; 2010) ==
Fourth generation
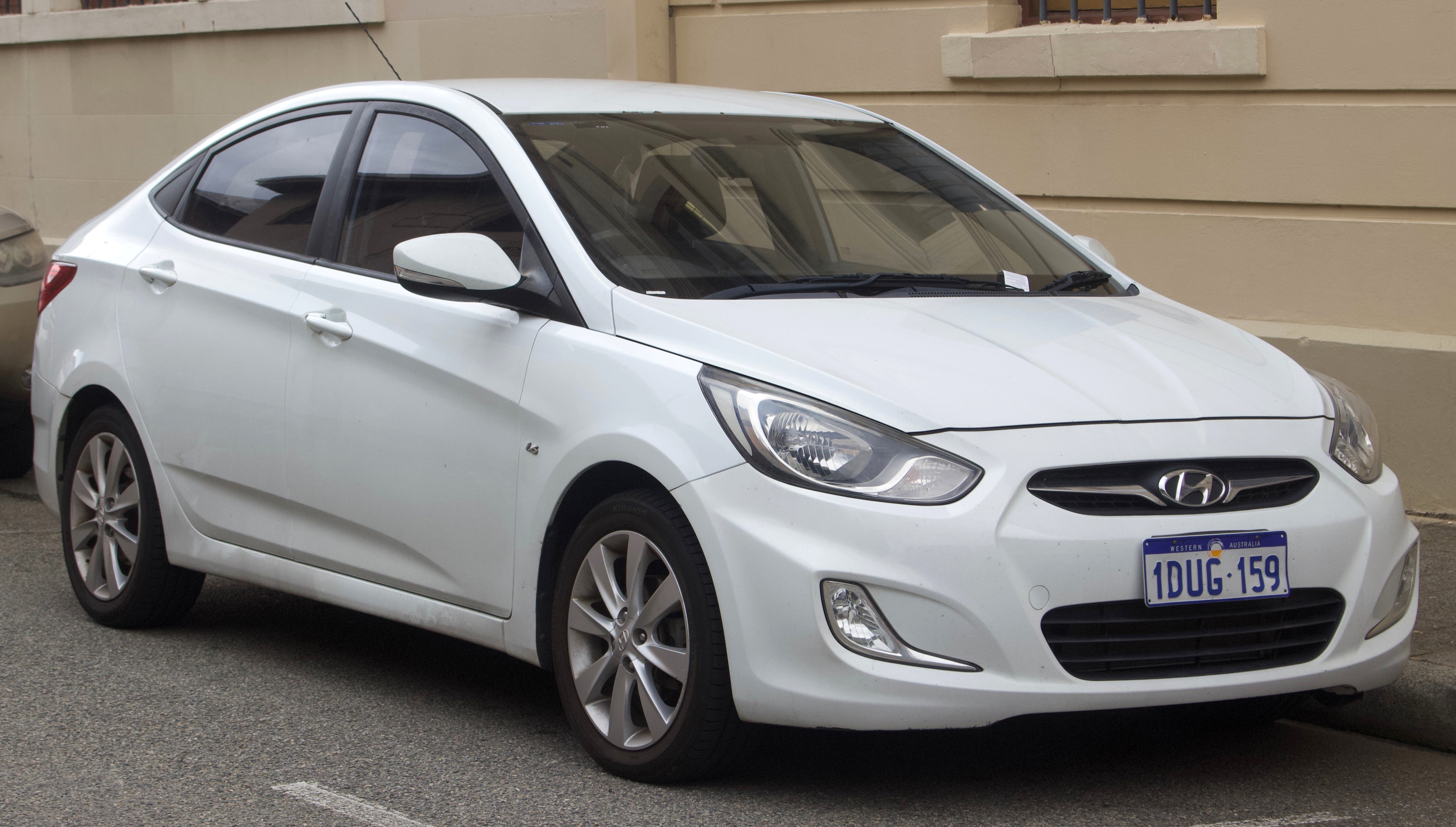

Overview
- Model code: RB; RC (China)
- Also called: Hyundai Verna; Hyundai Solaris (Russia, Egypt); Hyundai i25 Accent (Colombia, Israel); Hyundai Grand Avega (hatchback, Indonesia); Hyundai Excel III (sedan, Indonesia); Hyundai Grand Pony Taxi (sedan, Colombia); Dodge Attitude (Mexico); Hyundai Accent Blue (Turkey)
- Production: 2010–2019; 2012–2026 (Egypt)
- Model years: 2012–2017 (North America)
- Assembly: South Korea: Ulsan; Egypt: Cairo (GB Auto); Algeria: Tiaret (TMC); China: Beijing (Beijing Hyundai); India: Chennai (HMIL); Indonesia: Bekasi (HIM); Iran: Bam, Kerman (KMC); Mozambique: Matola (Somyoung Motors); Nigeria: Lagos (HMNL); Russia: St. Petersburg (HMMR); Taiwan: Hukou, Hsinchu (SYM Motors)

Body and chassis
- Body style: 4-door sedan 5-door hatchback
- Platform: Hyundai-Kia PB
- Related: Hyundai Reina; Hyundai i20 (PB); Hyundai HB20 (HB); Kia Rio (QB); Kia Rio (UB); Kia Pegas

Powertrain
- Engine: Petrol: 1.4 L Gamma MPi I4; 1.4 L Kappa MPi I4; 1.6 L Gamma MPi I4; 1.6 L Gamma II MPi I4; 1.6 L Gamma II GDi I4; Diesel: 1.4 L U II CRDi I4; 1.6 L U II CRDi I4
- Transmission: 5-speed manual 6-speed M6CF1 manual 4-speed automatic 6-speed A6GF1 automatic 7-speed DCT; CVT

Dimensions
- Wheelbase: 2,570 mm (101.2 in)
- Length: 4,115 mm (162.0 in) (hatchback); 4,370 mm (172.0 in) (sedan)
- Width: 1,705 mm (67.1 in)
- Height: 1,455 mm (57.3 in)
- Curb weight: 1,040–1,170 kg (2,292.8–2,579.4 lb)

Chronology
- Predecessor: Hyundai i20 (PB) (Indonesia)
- Successor: Hyundai i20 (GB) (Indonesia)

Hyundai held the world-premiere of the fourth generation Accent as the Verna at the 2010 Beijing Auto Show.

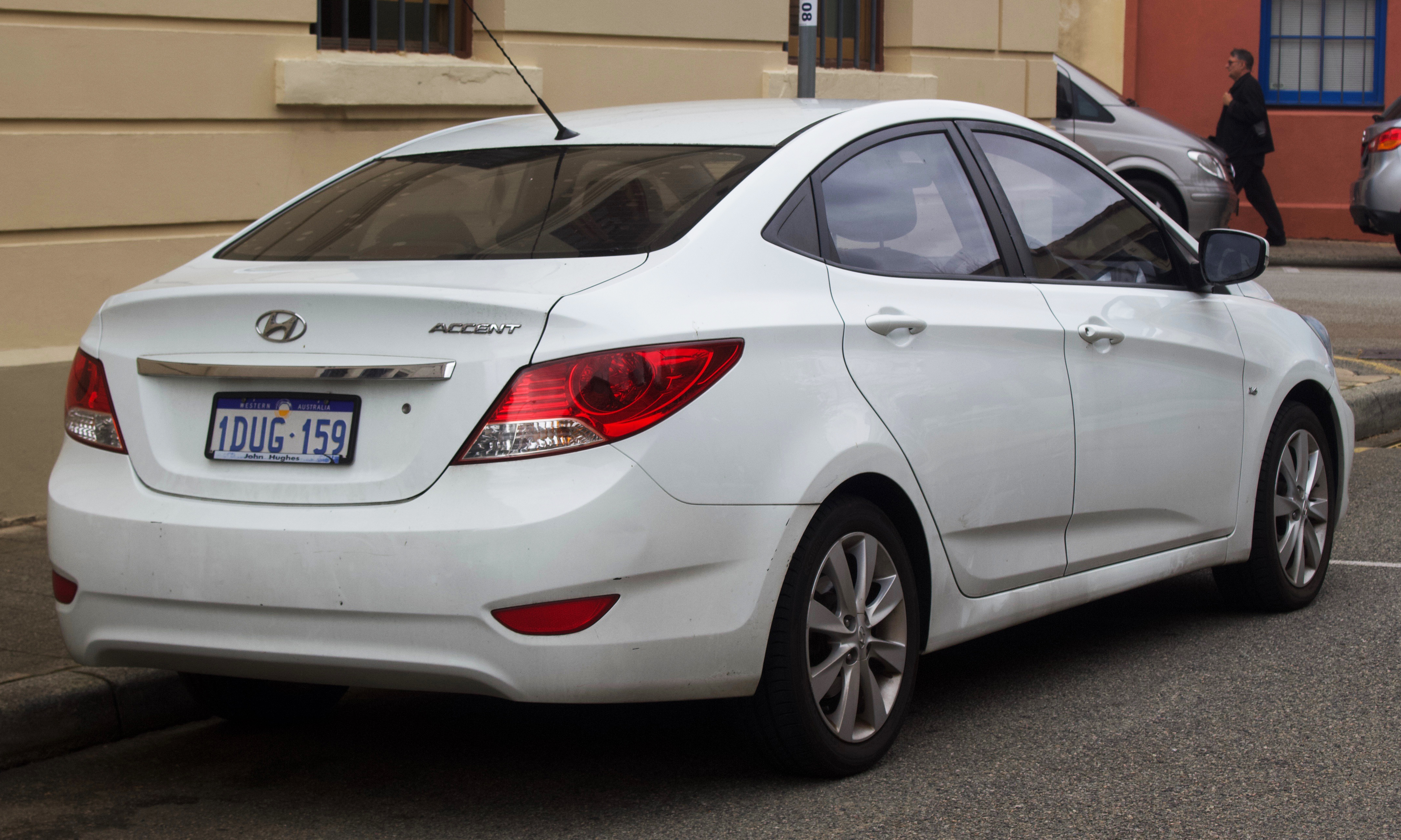
Rear view (sedan) (Australia)

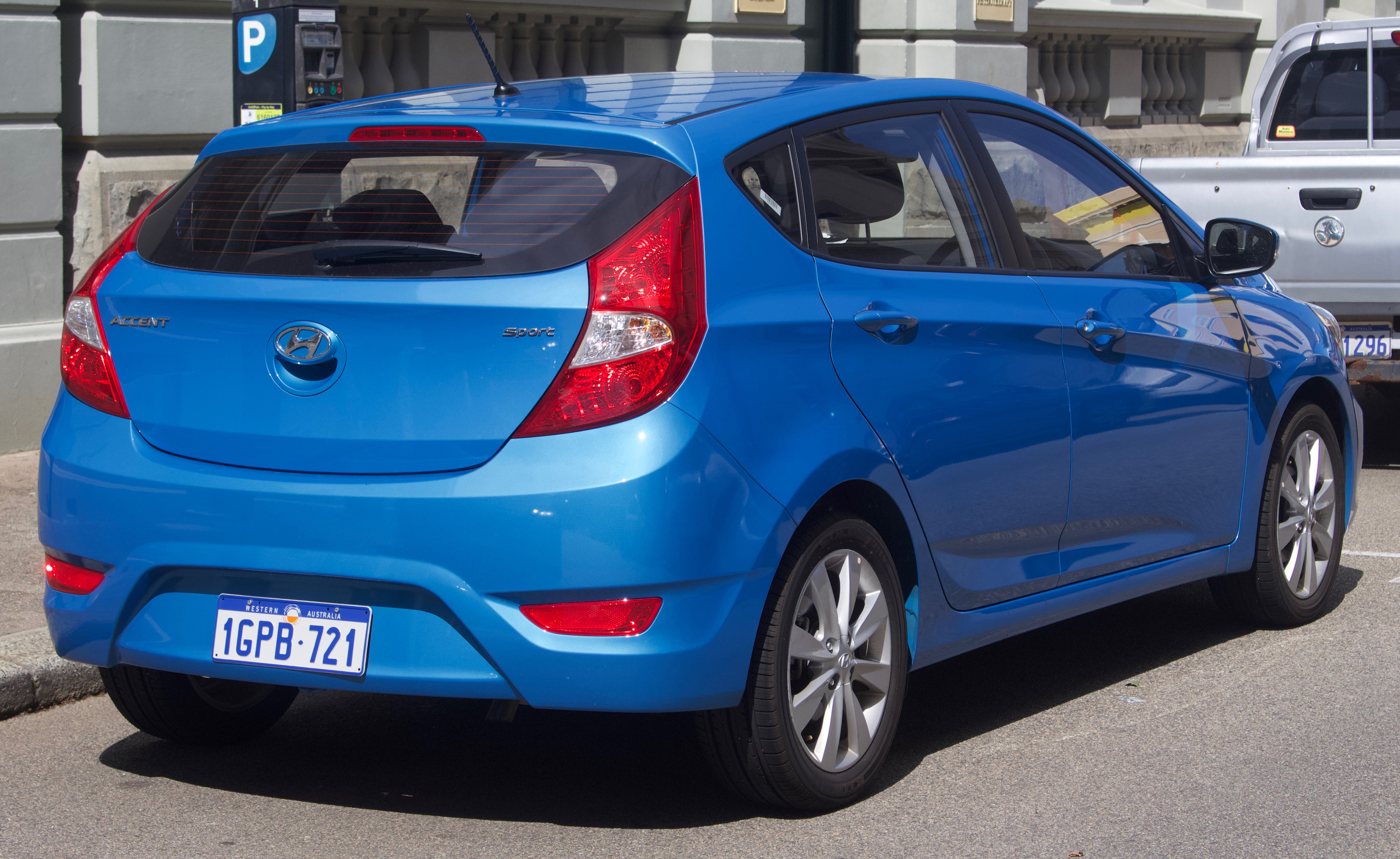
Rear view (hatchback) (Australia)

=== Markets ===
==== South Korea ====
Hyundai released the Korean version of the Accent (RB series) in November 2010. The model was offered with the same 1.6-litre engine and 6-speed automatic or 6-speed manual as the fifth-generation (MD) Elantra. The car reverted to the "Accent" name as used in the X3 series. The hatchback version, called Accent WIT, replaces the Getz/Click in South Korea. Sedan model was discontinued since in late 2018; the hatchback model was in August 2018. It was sold until Hyundai Venue launched in July 2019.

==== North America ====
In January 2011, the sedan had its North American debut and the hatchback had its world debut at the Montreal Auto Show.

There was one engine option available in North America for the Accent, a 1.6 L with 138 hp (103 kW) and 123 lb/ft of torque (2011 - 2017 models). This engine features the gas direct injection technology (1.6 "GDI"). Also, the head and block are made of aluminum.

==== Australia ====
Australia's Accent was released in August 2011 in three grades consisting of Active, Elite, and Premium in either Sedan or Hatch. All were equipped with a 1.6-litre MPi engine mated to a 5-speed manual or 4-speed automatic, while a 1.6-litre diesel was later added to the Active grade, but dropped shortly after. In 2013, an SR grade was added to replace the Elite and Premium grades and brought in the Gamma 1.6-litre GDi engine to the range. The Active had switched to a 1.4-litre engine and optional CVT to keep costs down due to the discontinuation of the i20 in Australia.

As part of a 2017 upgrade, Hyundai simplified the Accent to just one grade called Sport. The Sport grade combined the SR's 1.6-litre engine, Premium interior materials, mesh-look grille, cruise control, optional 6-speed automatic, and 16" alloy wheels while staying close to the Active's entry price.

As of January 2020, the Accent was removed from the Hyundai Australia website, marking the end of the nameplate's 20-year run with sales reaching a total of 9,963 registered units in its last year on sale.

==== Russia ====
In September 2010, Hyundai unveiled its Russian assembly line and presented the Hyundai Solaris, a production-ready local version of the four-door fourth generation Accent. Production commenced in January 2011. For the Russian market, the Accent badge remained reserved for the second generation Accent that had still been produced in Taganrog in the TagAZ plant at that time, while export models are badged as the Accent. The Hyundai Solaris was available with 1.4-litre Gamma (107 hp) and 1.6-litre Gamma (123 hp) petrol engines, with a 6-speed manual or a 4-speed automatic transmission.

In 2014, the Solaris was facelifted. The car got new front fascia and new 6-speed automatic and 6-speed manual gearboxes for 1.6 version.

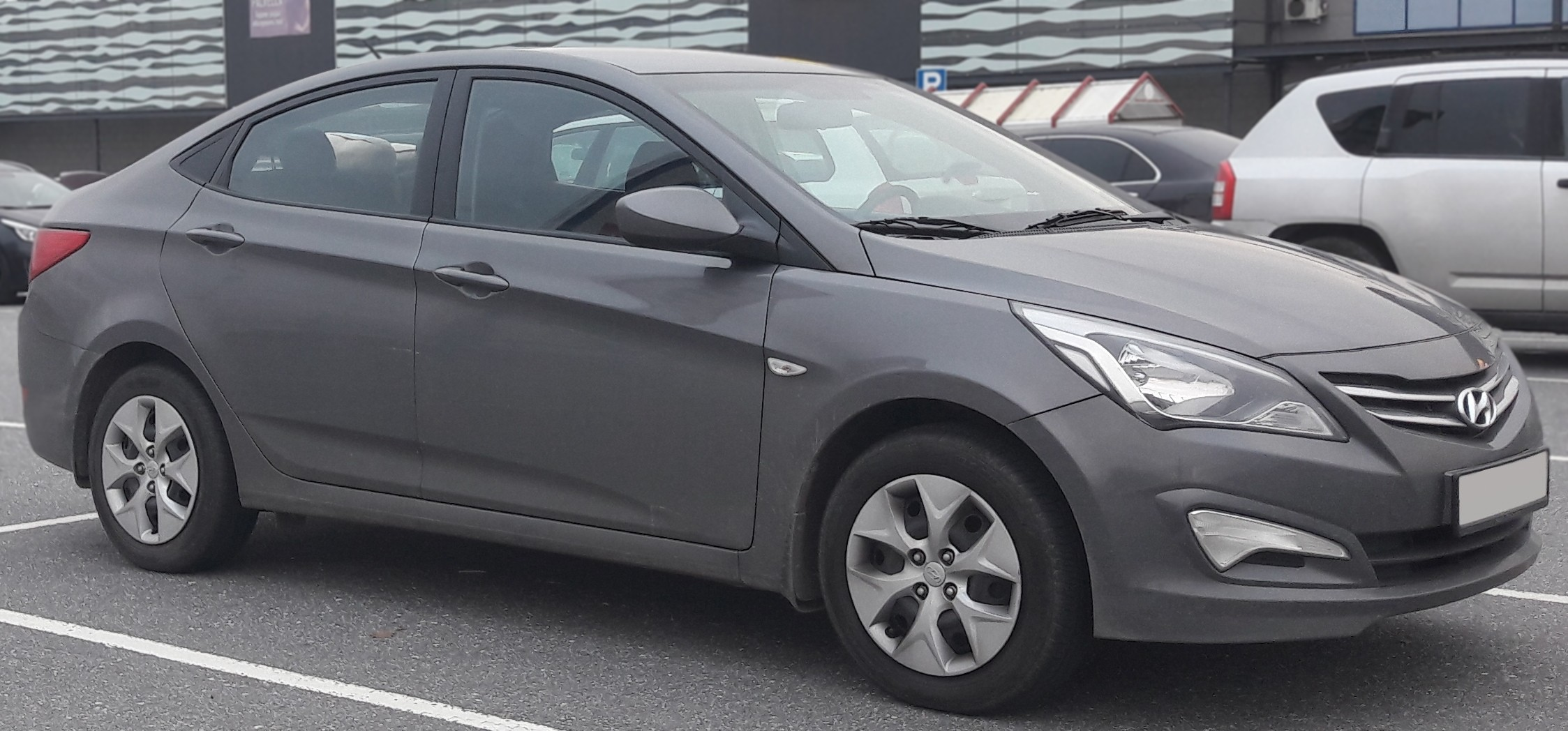
2014–2017 Hyundai Solaris Sedan (facelift, Russia)

==== India ====
In May 2011, Hyundai launched the Verna with four engine options including 1.4-litre petrol and diesel engines as well as 1.6-litre petrol and diesel engines. The second-generation model (LC) continues to be sold in India as the Accent with the latest RB version carrying the Verna brand. At the time of launch, the new Verna RB features safety and comfort options that were previously unavailable in the Indian market at this price point including the option of 6 airbags. Hyundai refreshed the Indian lineup of Verna in 2014 without any engine changes.

The Verna was offered with four engine options, 1.4 L VTVT petrol, 1.6 L VTVT petrol, 1.4 L CRDi diesel, and 1.6 L CRDi diesel.

Hyundai launched the Verna facelift in the Indian car market on 18 February 2015. The new Verna mid-sized sedan gets changes to both styling and mechanism. The updated Hyundai Verna gets new front fascia. Apart from the same petrol and diesel engine versions, the four-speed automatic gearbox is likely to be offered in the upcoming model; however, the maker might also introduce the six-speed automatic gearbox.

In 2018, the Hyundai Verna was named Indian Car Of The Year.

==== Indonesia ====
In Indonesia, the Accent hatchback was sold as the Grand Avega, which made its debut at the 2011 Indonesia International Motor Show and was assembled locally (CKD). The Grand Avega is equipped with two engines and four transmissions: a 1.4-litre Gamma petrol engine producing 108 PS (107 hp) with 4-speed automatic or 5-speed manual (2011–2013) and a 1.4 L petrol 100 PS Kappa engine with 6-speed manual or CVT (2013–2016). Sedan body style also available in Indonesia only for taxi fleet and sold as Excel III, only available with 1.4 L petrol 108 PS Gamma engine and 5-speed manual transmission. In 2016, Grand Avega was replaced by the smaller Hyundai i20.

==== Mexico ====
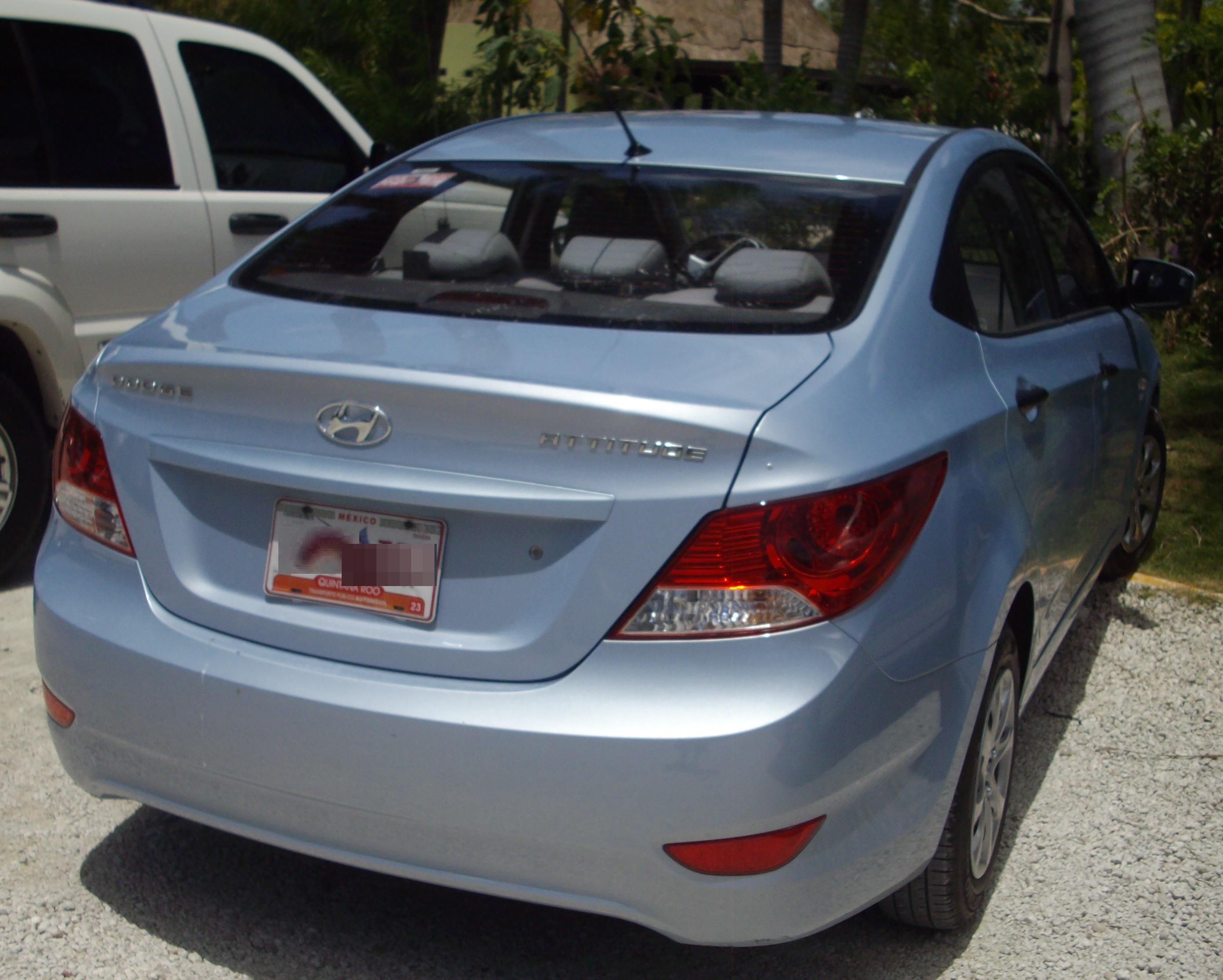
Dodge Attitude (Mexico)

In Mexico, it was marketed as Dodge Attitude from 2011 until May 2014, when Hyundai's arrival in the country forced Dodge to give the Attitude nameplate to the Mitsubishi Attrage. The Accent returned to the country in mid-2017 as the 2018 Hyundai Accent.

==== Philippines ====
In the Philippines, the RB model was launched in 2011. The sedan version was powered by a 108 PS (107 hp) Gamma engine with a choice of a 4-speed automatic or 5-speed manual transmission. Some of first batch of RB models were dogged by knocking issues when using 91 and below octane fuel. A second iteration was introduced in 2014 with a 100 Ps Kappa engine mated to a 6-speed manual or a 4-speed automatic, and a newer 1.6-litre D4FB common rail direct injection turbodiesel with 126 PS (124 hp) and 260 N⋅m (192 lb⋅ft) in either a 6-speed manual or a 4-speed automatic.

The hatchback model was introduced at 2013 exclusively with a 1.6 D4FB common rail direct injection turbodiesel with VGT. Power output is at 126 Ps and 260 N⋅m (192 lb⋅ft). Both the 6-speed manual and 4-speed Automatic models came with anti-lock braking systems (ABS) with electronic brake distribution. By 2014, a facelifted model was introduced with the top-end model getting new projector-type headlamps, ABS and EBD.

In 2015, the diesel variant was upgraded on both sedan and hatchback models with an electronic VGT (e-VGT), mated to a 6-speed manual or a new 7-speed dual-clutch automatic transmission (DCT). Power outputs are now 136 PS (134 hp) and 265 N⋅m (195 lb⋅ft) for the 6-speed manual while the DCT model has the same horsepower but now has 300 N⋅m (221 lb⋅ft) of torque.

==== China ====
In Beijing, China, Hyundai released the China-exclusive version of this model under the "Verna" name on 23 August 2010 under the model code RC.

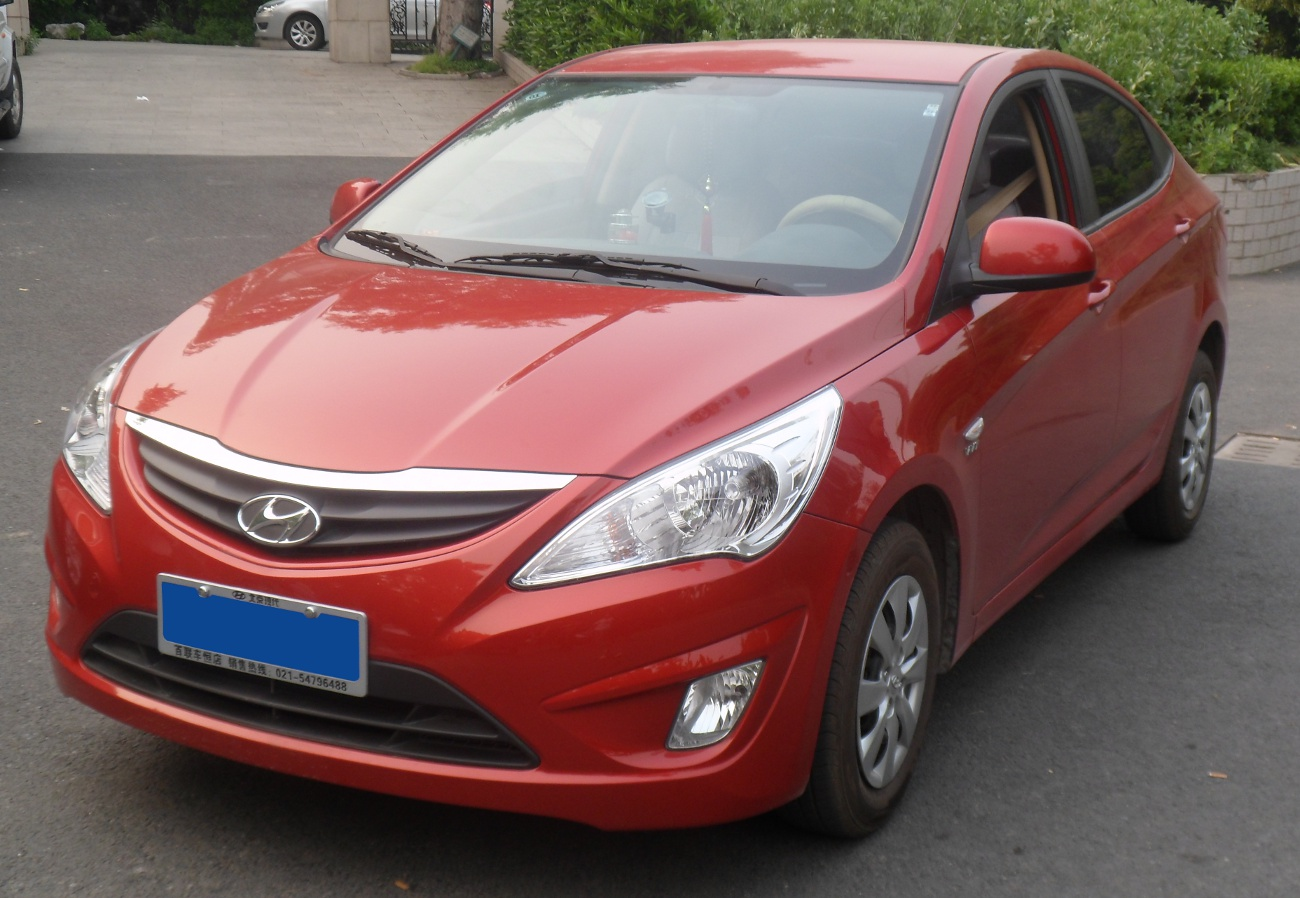
Hyundai Verna sedan (RC; pre-facelift, China)

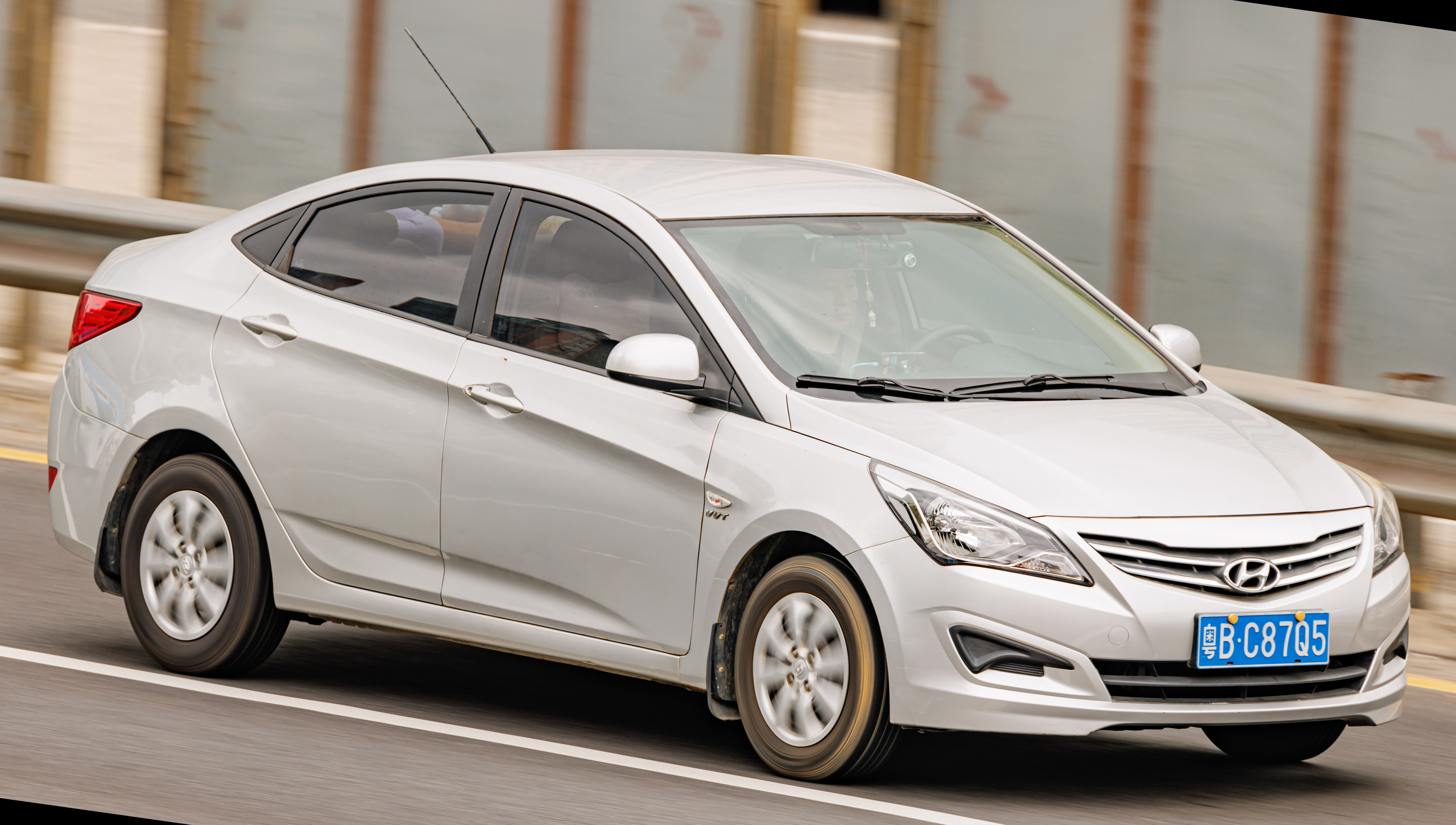
Hyundai Verna sedan (RC; facelift, China)

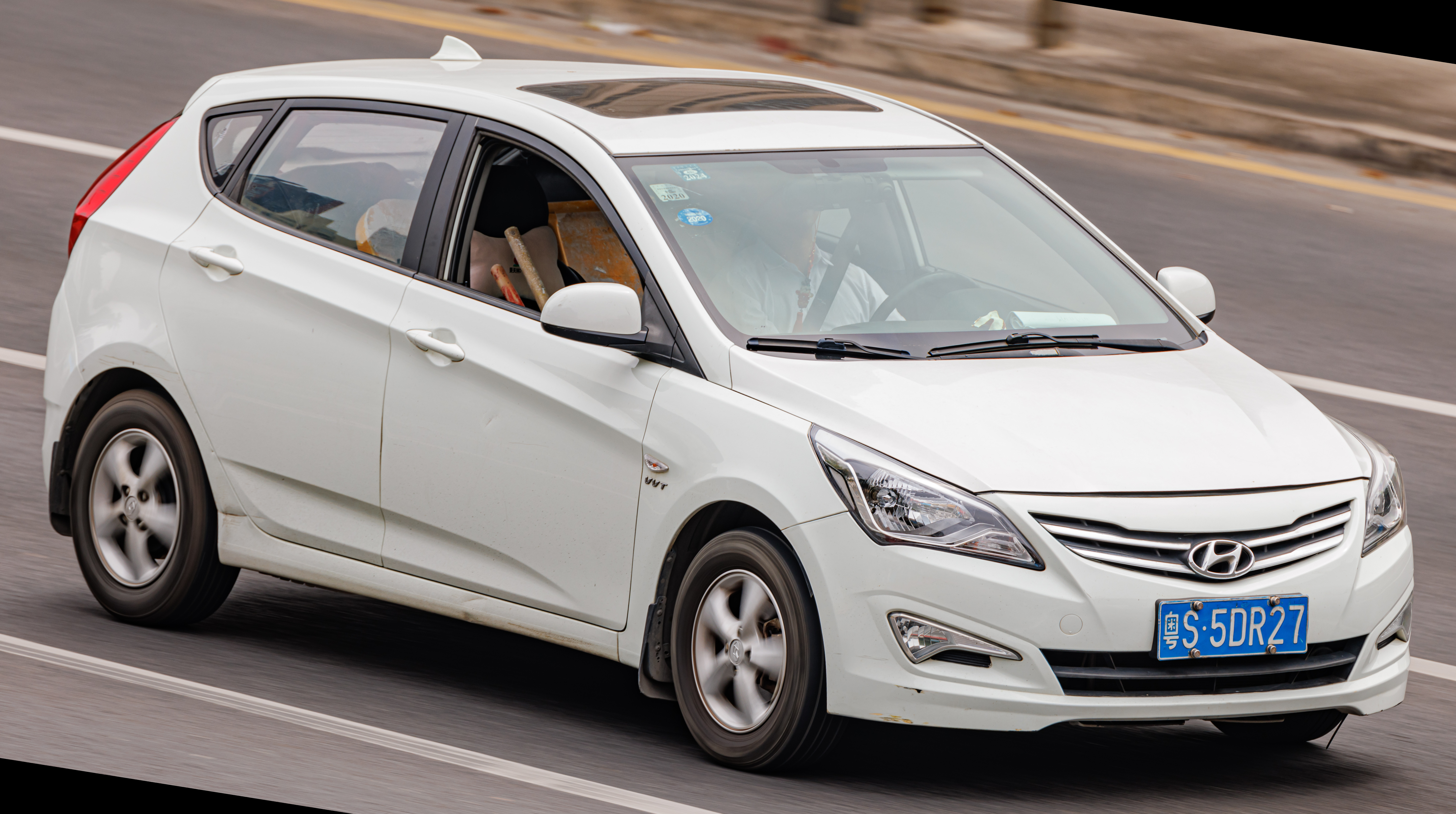
Hyundai Verna hatchback (RC; facelift, China)

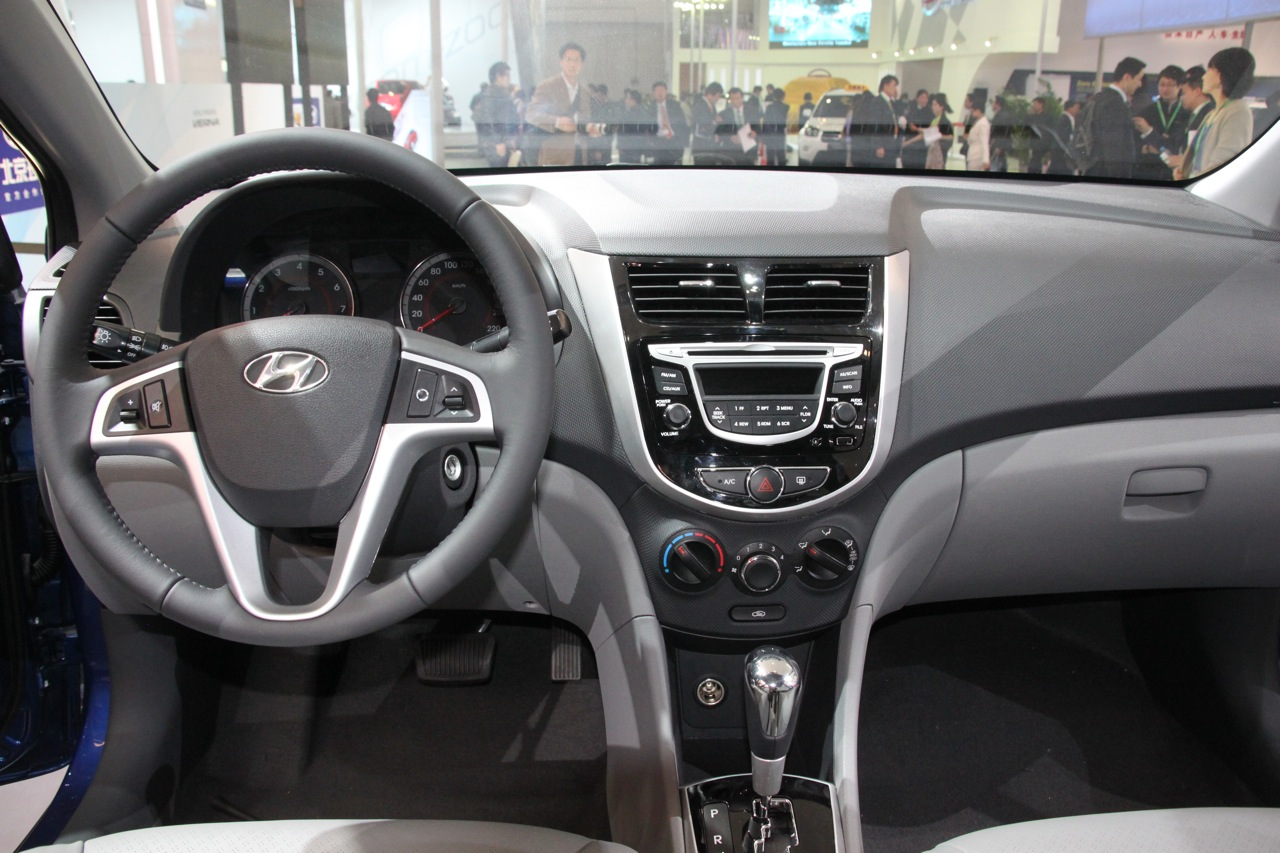
Interior

=== Safety ===
==== Latin NCAP ====
The Accent made in South Korea in its most basic Latin American market configuration with no airbags, no ABS and no ESC received 0 stars for adult occupants and 1 star for toddlers from Latin NCAP 2.0 in 2018.

Latin NCAP 2.0 test results Hyundai Accent NO Airbags (2018, based on Euro NCAP 2008)
Test	Points	Stars
Adult occupant:	0.00/34.0	0 /5 stars
Child occupant:	16.04/49.00	1 /5 stars

==== ANCAP ====
ANCAP test results* Hyundai Accent all sedan and hatch variants (2011)
Test	Score
Overall	5 /5 stars
Frontal offset	14.66/16
Side impact	16/16
Pole	2/2
Seat belt reminders	3/3
Whiplash protection	Good
Pedestrian protection	Adequate
Electronic stability control	Standard

==== China NCAP ====
The Hyundai Verna was crash-tested by China NCAP in 2011 and scored the maximum possible 5 stars.

==== NHTSA ====
The 2012 Hyundai Accent was tested by the U.S. National Highway Traffic Safety Administration (NHTSA) and received the following:

- Overall Rating:
- Frontal Crash:
- Side Crash: *
- Rollover:

==== IIHS ====
The 2012 Hyundai Accent was tested by the IIHS and received a "Good" rating in the frontal offset test, an "Acceptable" rating in the side impact test, and a "Good" rating in the roof strength test. It also received a "Good" rating in the rear crash protection (head restraint) test.

Insurance Institute for Highway Safety (IIHS) was safety tested by IIHS in 2012

IIHS Hyundai Accent scores:
Small overlap front driver-side	Poor
Moderate overlap front	Good
Side	Acceptable
Roof strength	Good
Head restraints & seats	Good

== Fifth generation (HC/YC; 2017) ==
Fifth generation

Overview
- Model code: HC; YC (China)
- Also called: Hyundai Verna; Hyundai Solaris (Russia, 2017–2022); Solaris HS (Russia, 2024–2026)
- Production: 2016–2022 (China); 2017–2022 (Mexico); 2017–2022, 2024–2026 (Russia); 2017–2023 (India); 2019–2022 (Philippines)
- Model years: 2018–2022 (North America); 2018–2023 (Middle East)
- Assembly: Mexico: Pesquería (KMMX); India: Chennai (HMIL); Russia: St. Petersburg (HMMR); China: Beijing (Beijing Hyundai); Philippines: Santa Rosa, Laguna (HARI); Vietnam: Ninh Bình (HTMV); Algeria: Tiaret (TMC)
- Designer: Chanhee Lee

Body and chassis
- Body style: 4-door sedan 5-door hatchback
- Platform: Hyundai-Kia K2
- Related: Kia Rio (YB); Kia Rio (FB); Hyundai Venue (QX)

Powertrain
- Engine: Petrol: 1.0 L Kappa II T-GDi I3; 1.4 L Kappa MPi I4; 1.5 L Smartstream G1.5 MPi I4; 1.6 L Gamma MPi I4; 1.6 L Smartstream G1.6 DPi I4; Diesel: 1.4 L U II CRDi I4; 1.5 L U II CRDi I4; 1.6 L U II CRDi I4
- Transmission: 6-speed manual 6-speed automatic 7-speed DCT; C0GF1 CVT

Dimensions
- Wheelbase: 2,580 mm (101.6 in); 2,600 mm (102.4 in) (HCi/HCr/YC)
- Length: 4,190 mm (165.0 in) (hatchback); 4,385 mm (172.6 in) (HC sedan); 4,405 mm (173.4 in) (HCr/YC); 4,440 mm (174.8 in) (HCi)
- Width: 1,729 mm (68.1 in)
- Height: 1,450–1,475 mm (57.1–58.1 in)
- Curb weight: 1,060–1,225 kg (2,337–2,701 lb)

Chronology
- Successor: Hyundai HB20 (BR2) (Mexico)

The fifth-generation Accent was introduced in China as Verna in late 2016. Production began in the same year with sales started around February 2017. In Russia, where it is known as Solaris as well as in some other CIS markets, the car has been available since March 2017. In India, the car was launched in August 2017 as Verna. It went on sale in the United States in December 2017. Like the fourth-generation model, sedan and hatchback body styles are available, with the latter only available in Canada, Mexico and China.

Unlike the previous generations, the fifth-generation Accent is not sold in South Korea due to falling demand; instead the Venue crossover takes its place in 2019. Without supply from South Korea, the Accent was also phased out in Australia, leaving the entry model role to the Venue.

Rear view (sedan) (US)

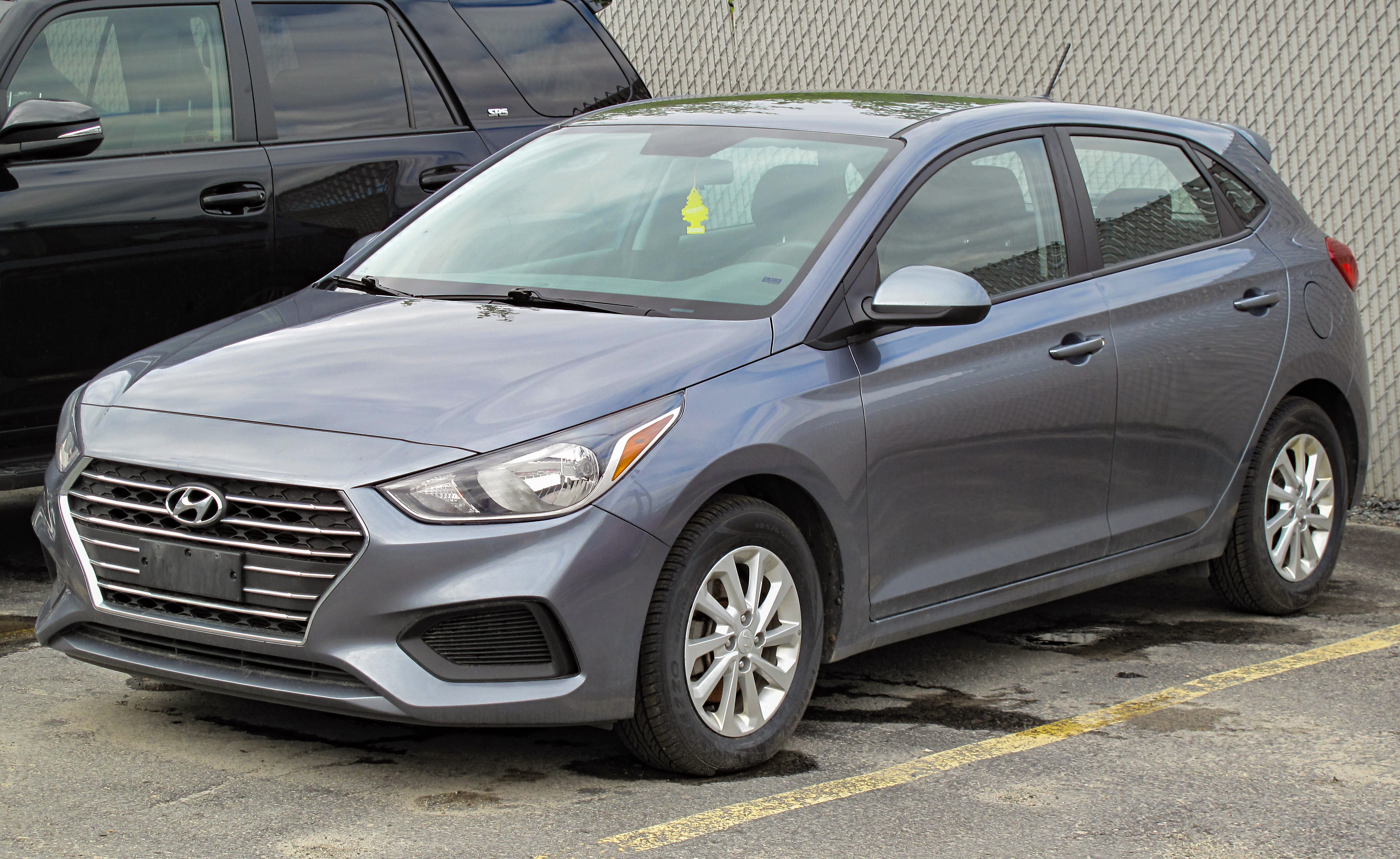
Hatchback (Canada)

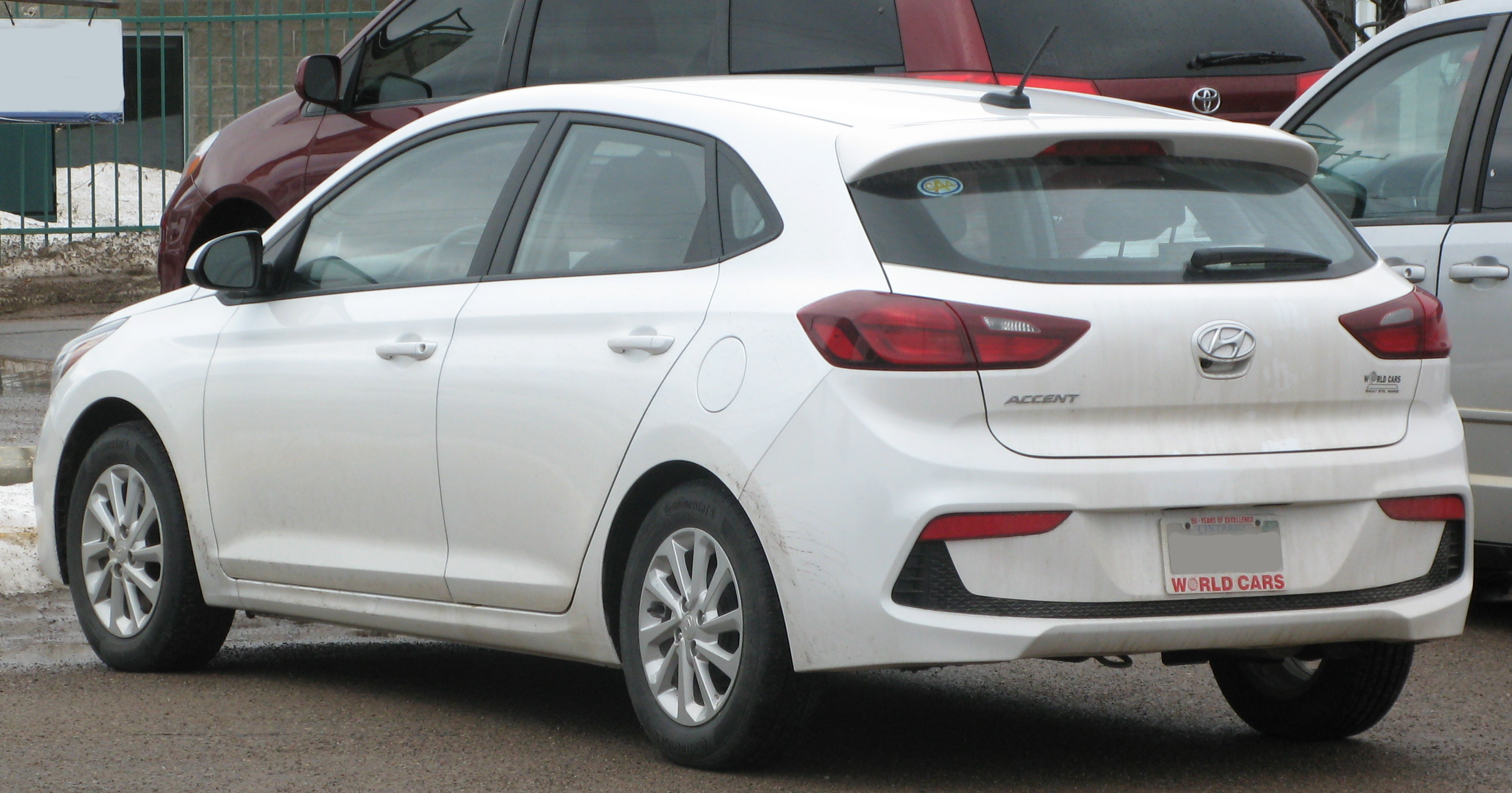
Rear view (hatchback) (Canada)

=== Markets ===
==== North America ====
The hatchback version of the fifth-generation Accent is not available in the United States market due to poor sales for its predecessor, while sedan version continued to be offered. The hatchback version was available alongside the sedan in Mexico and Canada only.

All models of the Accent sold in the United States and Canada are powered by the same 1.6-litre GDi four-cylinder gasoline engine as its predecessor, though horsepower is down to 130 hp (132 PS; 97 kW) from the previous rating of 138 hp (140 PS; 103 kW). The base SE features a six-speed manual transmission, while a six-speed automatic transmission was optional. The six-speed automatic transmission is standard on the SEL and Limited models.

Features available for the first time on the Accent include forward collision avoidance alert, a touch-screen infotainment system with optional Apple CarPlay, Android Auto, and Hyundai Blue Link, proximity key entry with push-button start, seventeen-inch aluminum-alloy wheels, heated dual front bucket seats, and more.

Power output for the 2020 model year onward has been decreased to 120 hp (122 PS; 89 kW), as the engine was replaced with a new Smartstream 1.6-litre DPi engine with continuously variable valve timing and CVT, replacing the geared automatic transmission.

The Accent was discontinued in Canada in the end of 2020 and was indirectly replaced by the Kona and Venue crossovers, after axing only the sedan model in 2019. The Accent sedan remained available in the United States, while both the sedan and hatchback remained available in Mexico until its discontinuation.

For 2022, the six-speed manual transmission, only offered in the base SE trim level, was discontinued in the United States.

In June 2022, Hyundai announced that the Accent would be discontinued for the 2023 model year, with its status as the entry-level Hyundai being filled by the Venue, whereas the Mexican market will receive the HB20 instead.

==== India ====
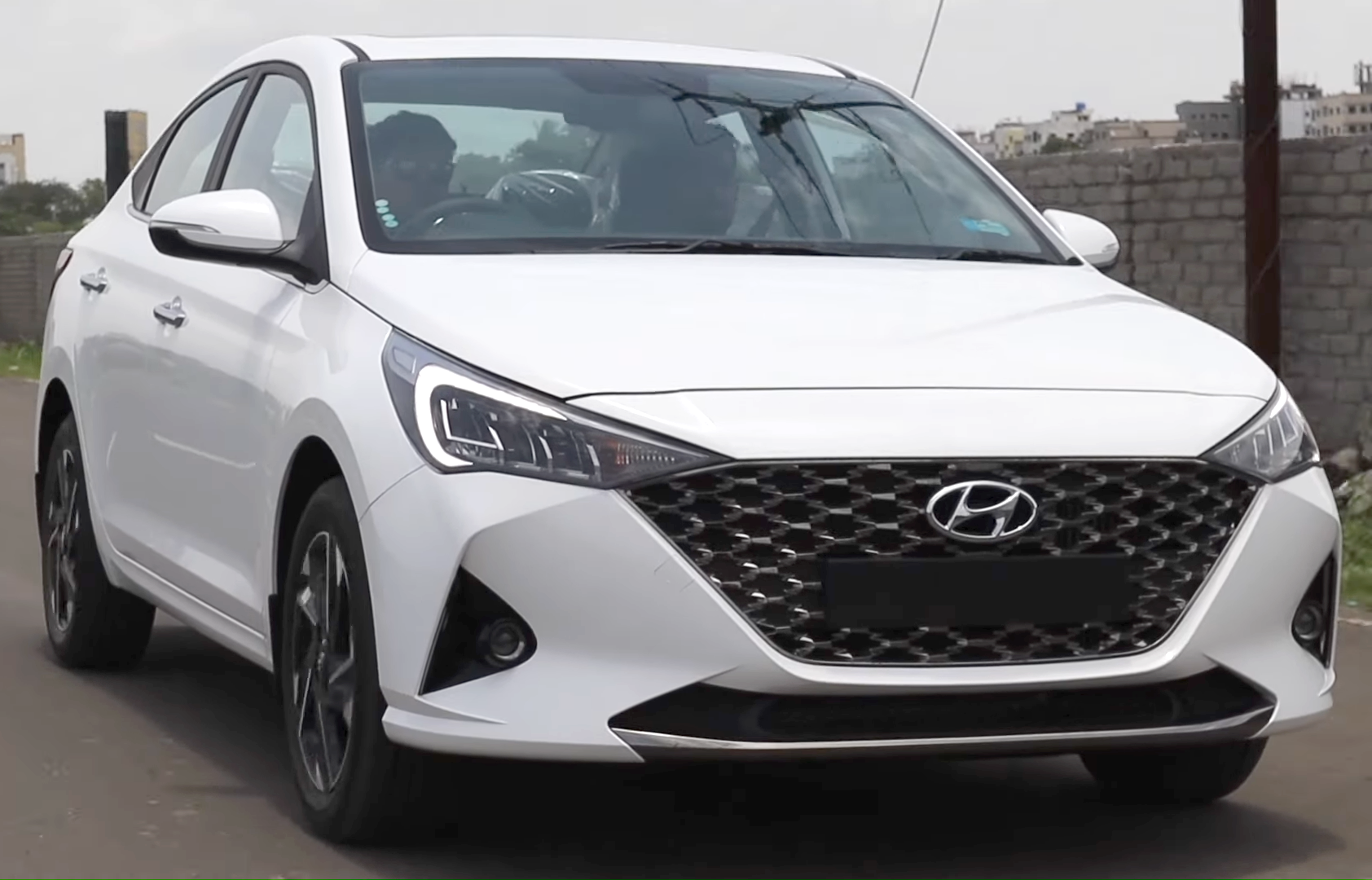
2020 Hyundai Verna 1.5 SX(O) (HCi; facelift, India)

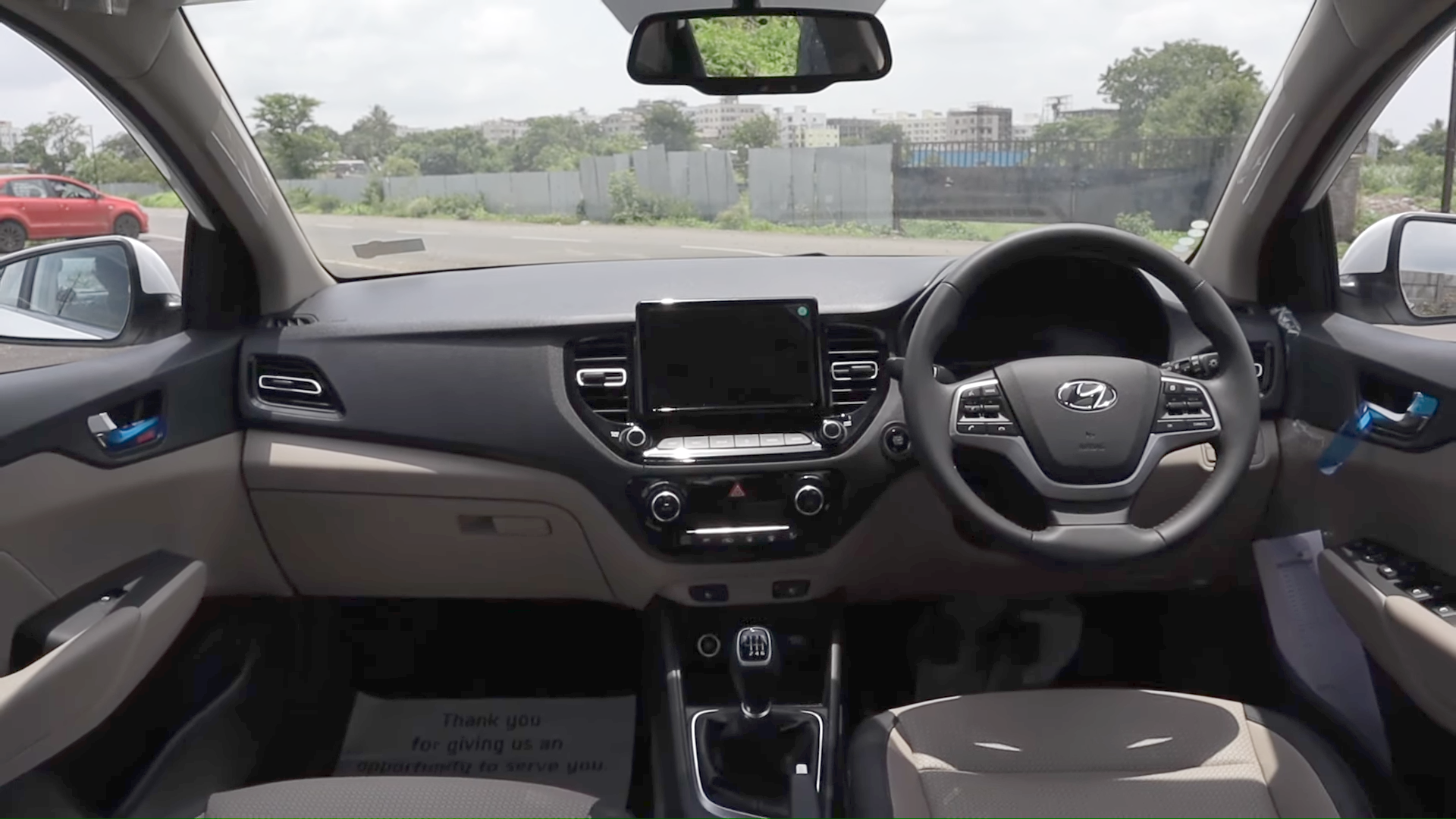
Interior (HCi; facelift)

Codenamed HCi, the Indian-market version was launched in August 2017 as the Verna. Hyundai stated the new Verna is underpinned by the K2 platform that is more rigid than the previous-gen model's platform, citing improvements in NVH levels, crashworthiness and overall stiffness. At launch, the Indian-market Verna was available with the 1.6-litre petrol and diesel engines carried from the previous generation and in four variants. Some of the main features includes 6 airbags, sunroof, handsfree trunk and front ventilated seats.

The 1.6-litre petrol engine produces 121 PS (119 hp; 89 kW) and 151 N⋅m (15.4 kg⋅m; 111 lb⋅ft) of torque and the 1.6-litre diesel producing 128 PS (126 hp; 94 kW) and 260 N⋅m (26.5 kg⋅m; 192 lb⋅ft) of torque. Both are now mated to 6-speed manual transmissions with an optional 6-speed automatic transmission. In 2018, a 1.4-litre diesel engine option borrowed from the i20 was introduced, producing 90 PS (89 hp; 66 kW) and 220 N⋅m (22.4 kg⋅m; 162 lb⋅ft).

The Bharat Stage 6-compliant facelifted model was released in March 2020. The Verna features cosmetic changes which include a refreshed front end, new LED headlamps, new rear bumper, revamped LED taillamps, and new dashboard design. Engine options were totally revamped, introducing three new engines. The base option is a 1.5-litre Smartstream MPi petrol which generates 115 PS (113 hp; 85 kW) and 144 N⋅m (14.7 kg⋅m; 106 lb⋅ft) of peak torque, available with a 6-speed manual and CVT. The 1.0-litre Kappa II turbo petrol churns out 120 PS (118 hp; 88 kW) and 172 N⋅m (17.5 kg⋅m; 127 lb⋅ft) output, paired to a 7-speed DCT. The 1.5-litre U2 CRDi diesel delivers 115 PS (113 hp; 85 kW) and 250 N⋅m (25.5 kg⋅m; 184 lb⋅ft), with transmission options of 6-speed manual and 6-speed automatic.

The HCi Accent/Verna is exported throughout Middle East, Africa, and to the Philippines and Vietnam in knock-down kits. In November 2020, the Verna was released in Chile as the new Accent. Two months later it was released in Peru with the same name, since the original fifth-generation model was not sold in these countries, keeping the previous generation until 2020.

==== Philippines ====
In the Philippines, the HC model was introduced in 2019. The model was assembled at Hyundai Asia Resources Inc. (HARI) at Santa Rosa, Laguna. The Philippine-market Accent comes with 1.4-litre petrol and 1.6-litre diesel engines. Trims included for the Philippine-market Accent includes: 1.4 GL, 1.4 GLS-V and 1.6 GL CRDi, with a choice of 6-speed manual (For both GL and CRDI grades) or 6-speed automatic (For all grades). The Base 1.4 GL has no airbags, while the mid-spec 1.4 GLS-V and top-spec 1.6 GL CRDi has driver and passenger airbags. It was discontinued in 2022 as Hyundai Motor Philippines (HMPH) replaced Hyundai Asia Resources Inc. (HARI) as the distributors of Hyundai passenger cars in the Philippines.

==== Russia ====
In late 2017, Hyundai Motor Manufacturing plant in Saint Petersburg started assembling the fifth-generation Solaris. It received renewed engines which are the Kappa 1.4-litre engine producing 100 PS (99 hp; 74 kW) and the 1.6-litre Gamma II engine with 123 PS (121 hp; 90 kW), paired with 6-speed manual or 6-speed automatic transmission.

In 2020, the restyled version of the Solaris was released, featuring a new front design, some additional comfort features and new touchscreen multimedia system. Engines and transmission options remained the same.

Amid the Russian invasion of Ukraine, production of the Solaris at the Saint Petersburg plant was halted in March 2022. In September 2023, Hyundai sold the Saint Petersburg factory to an unnamed Russian company. In February 2024, the Solaris was relaunched as the Solaris HS. The plant and the Solaris brand is under possession of AGR Automotive, a subsidiary of Russian company Art-Finans. These cars were produced from unassembled kits, which were sufficient for a production run of about 70,000 units.

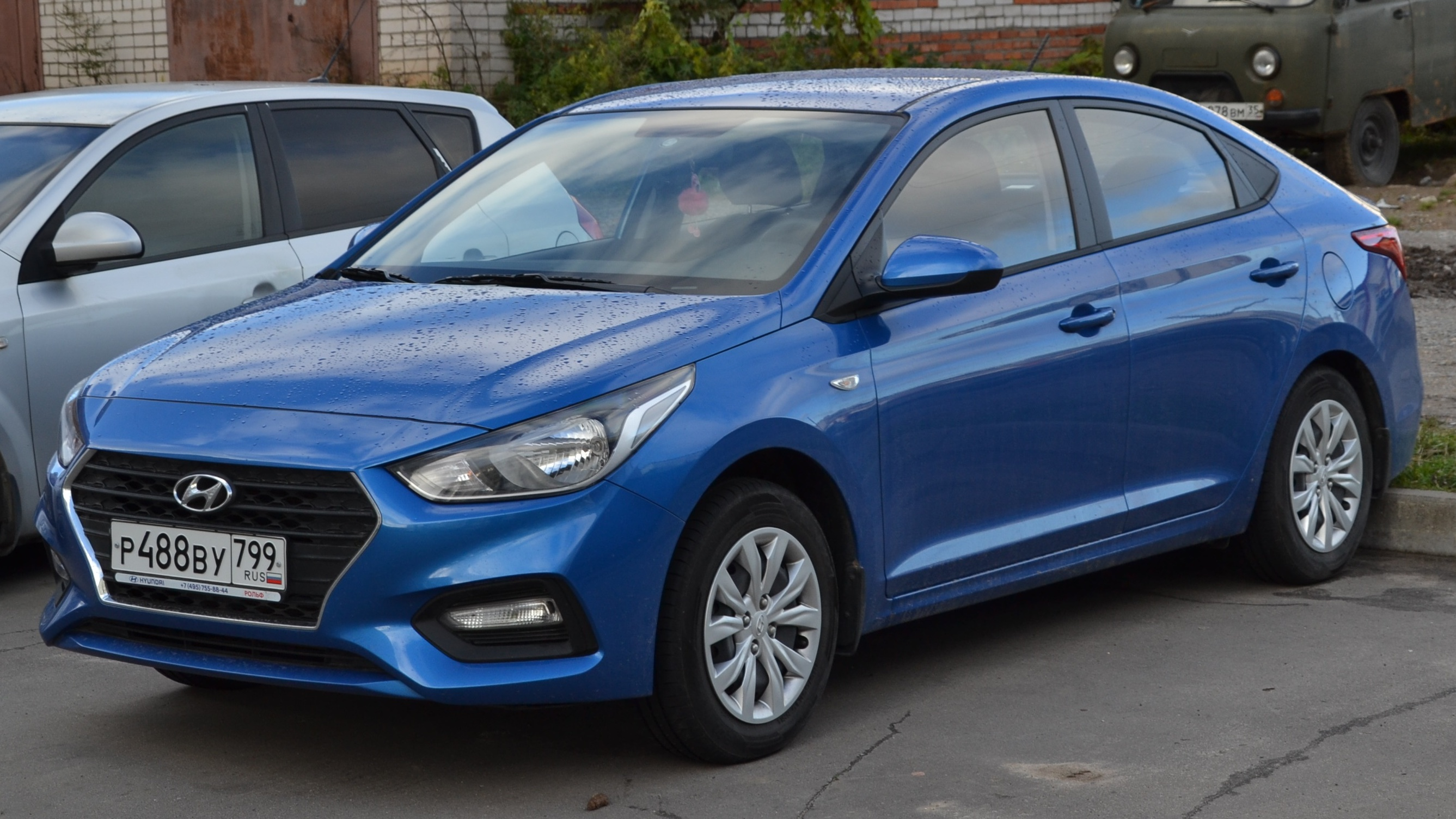
Hyundai Solaris (HCr; pre-facelift, Russia)

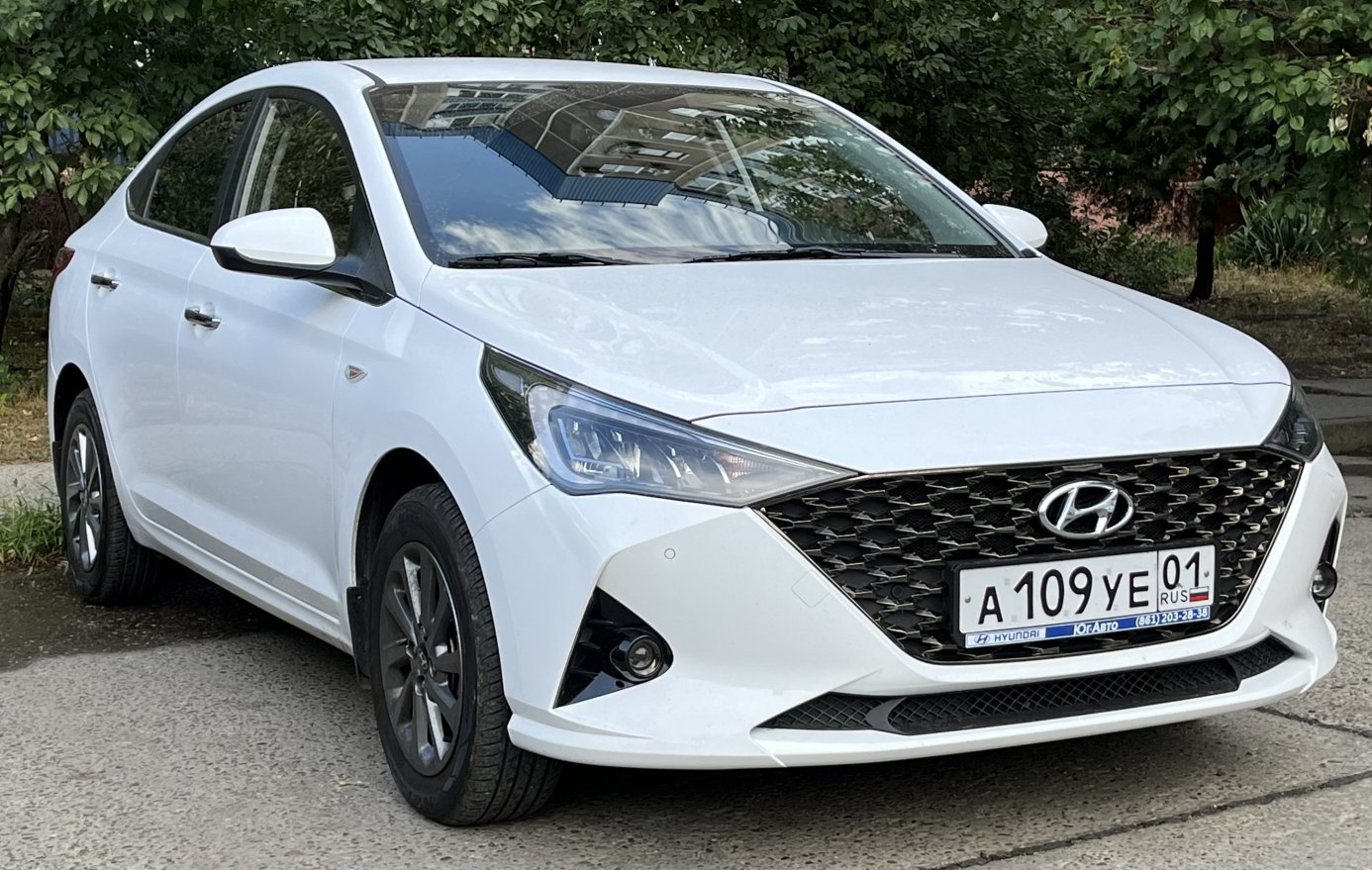
Hyundai Solaris (HCr; facelift, Russia)

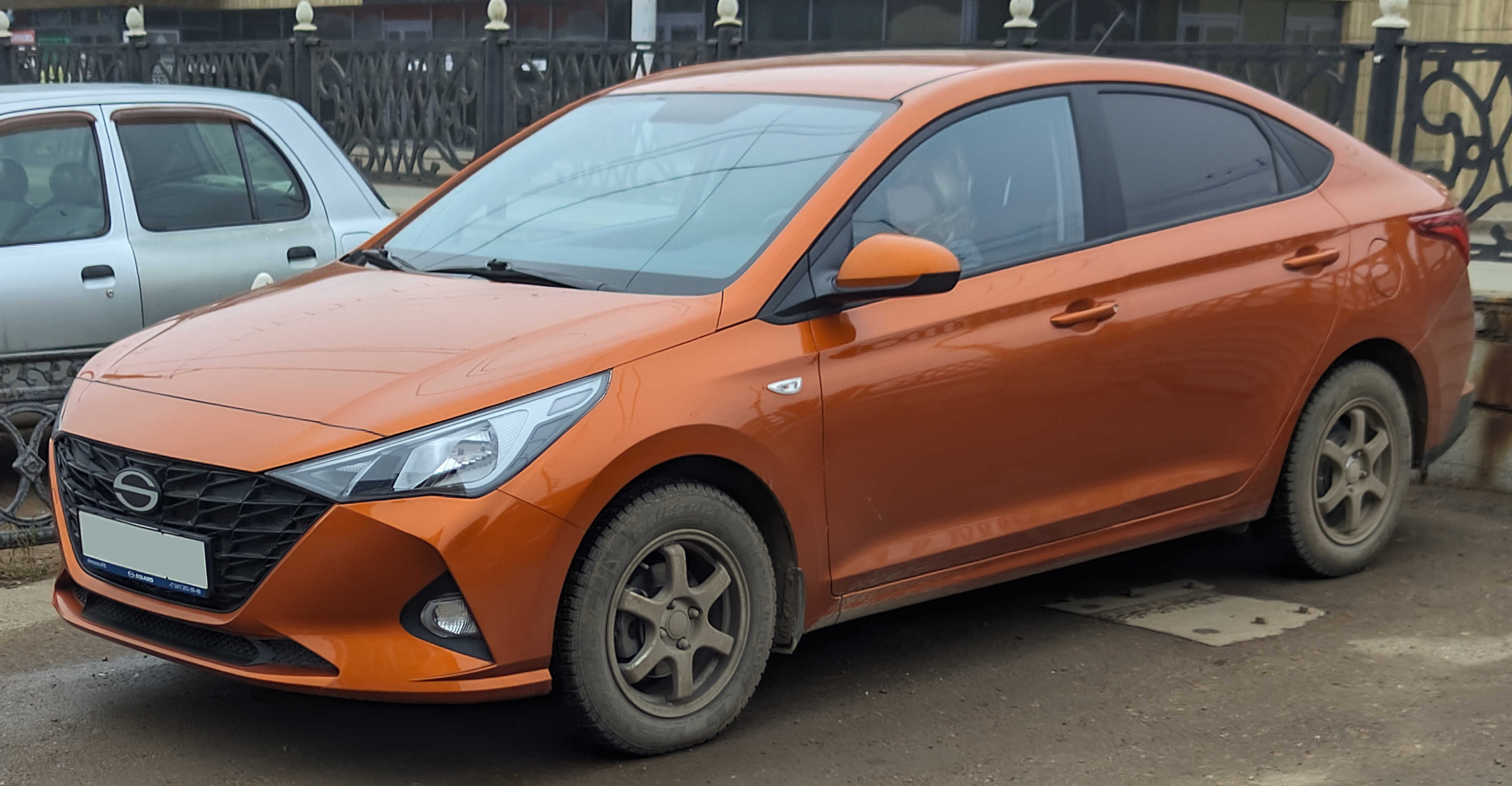
Solaris HS

==== China (YC) ====
The Verna was revealed as a concept version at the 2016 Chengdu Auto Show. It was sold from October 2016, with two body styles available which are 4-door sedan and 5-door hatchback, marketed as the Verna RV. The Chinese-market Verna facelift was revealed in October 2019.

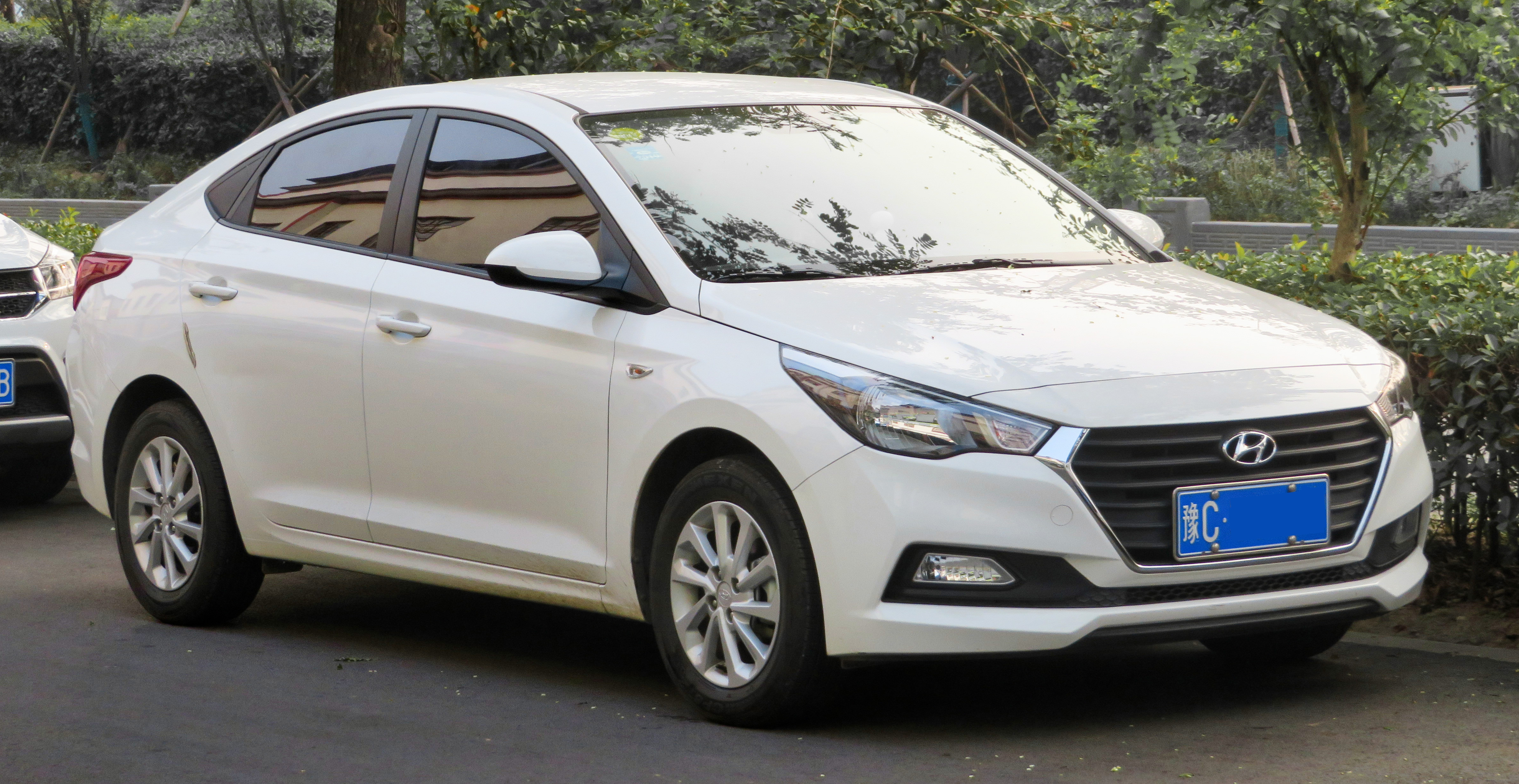
2017 Hyundai Verna (YC; pre-facelift, China)

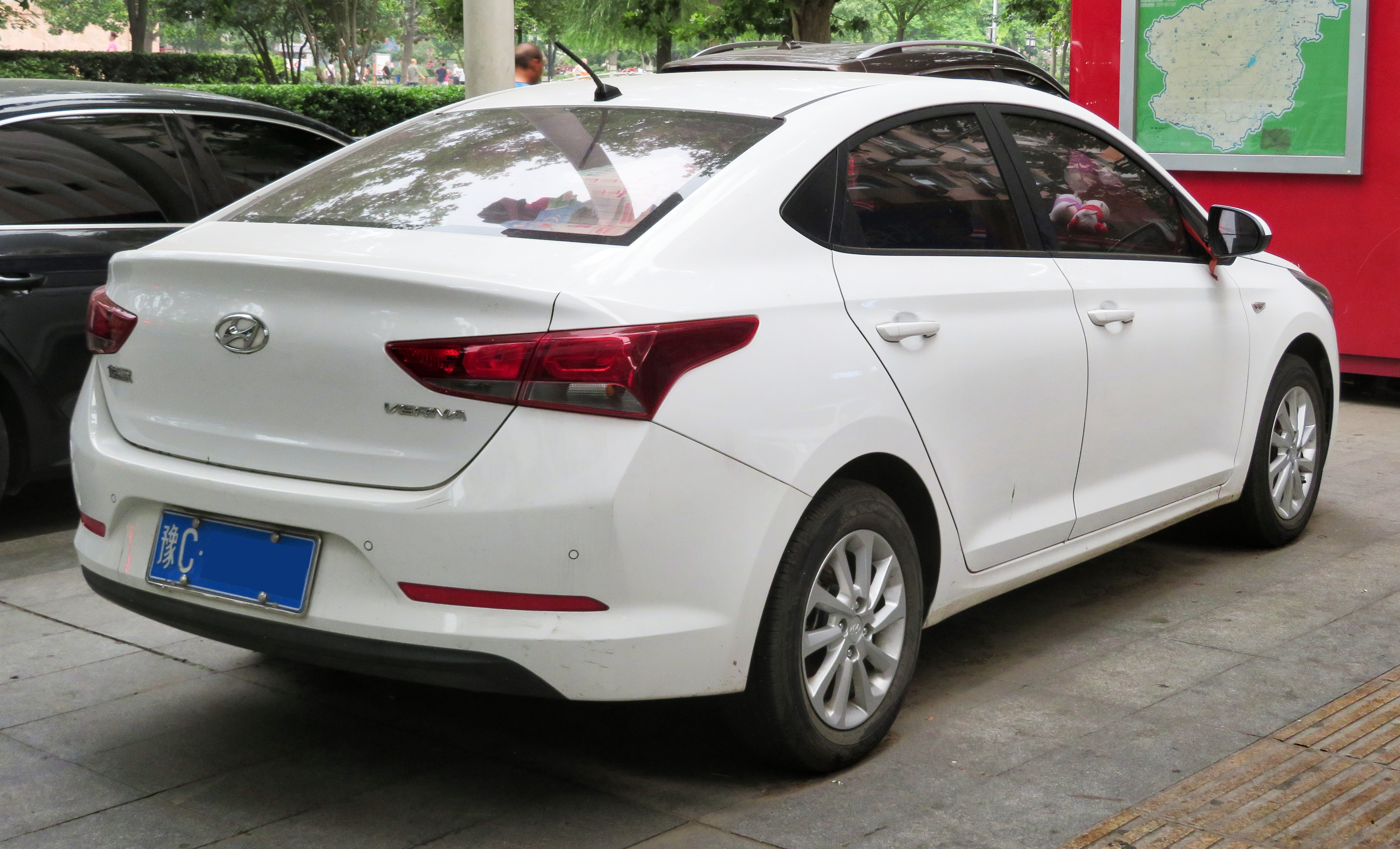
2017 Hyundai Verna (YC; pre-facelift, China)

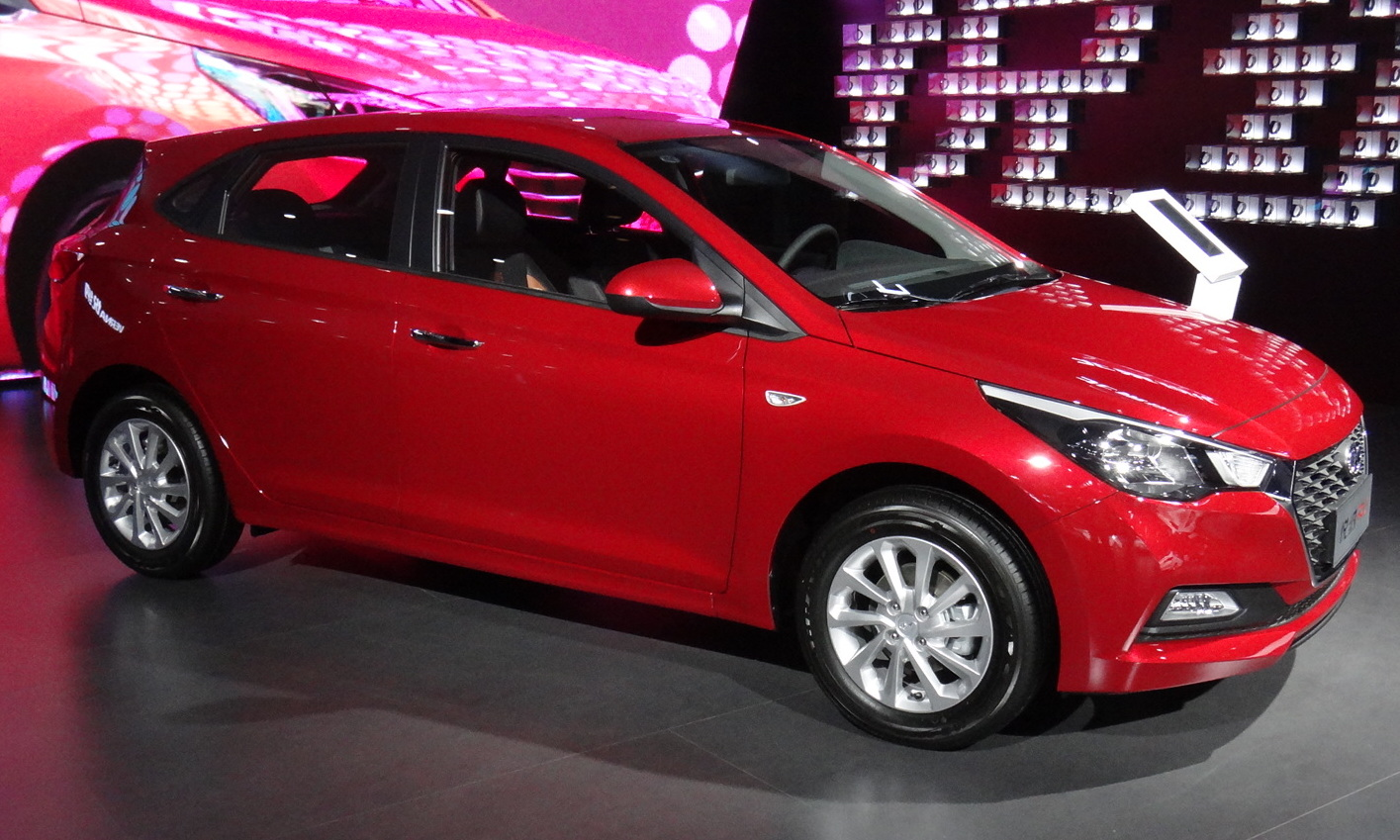
2017 Hyundai Verna RV (YC; pre-facelift, China)

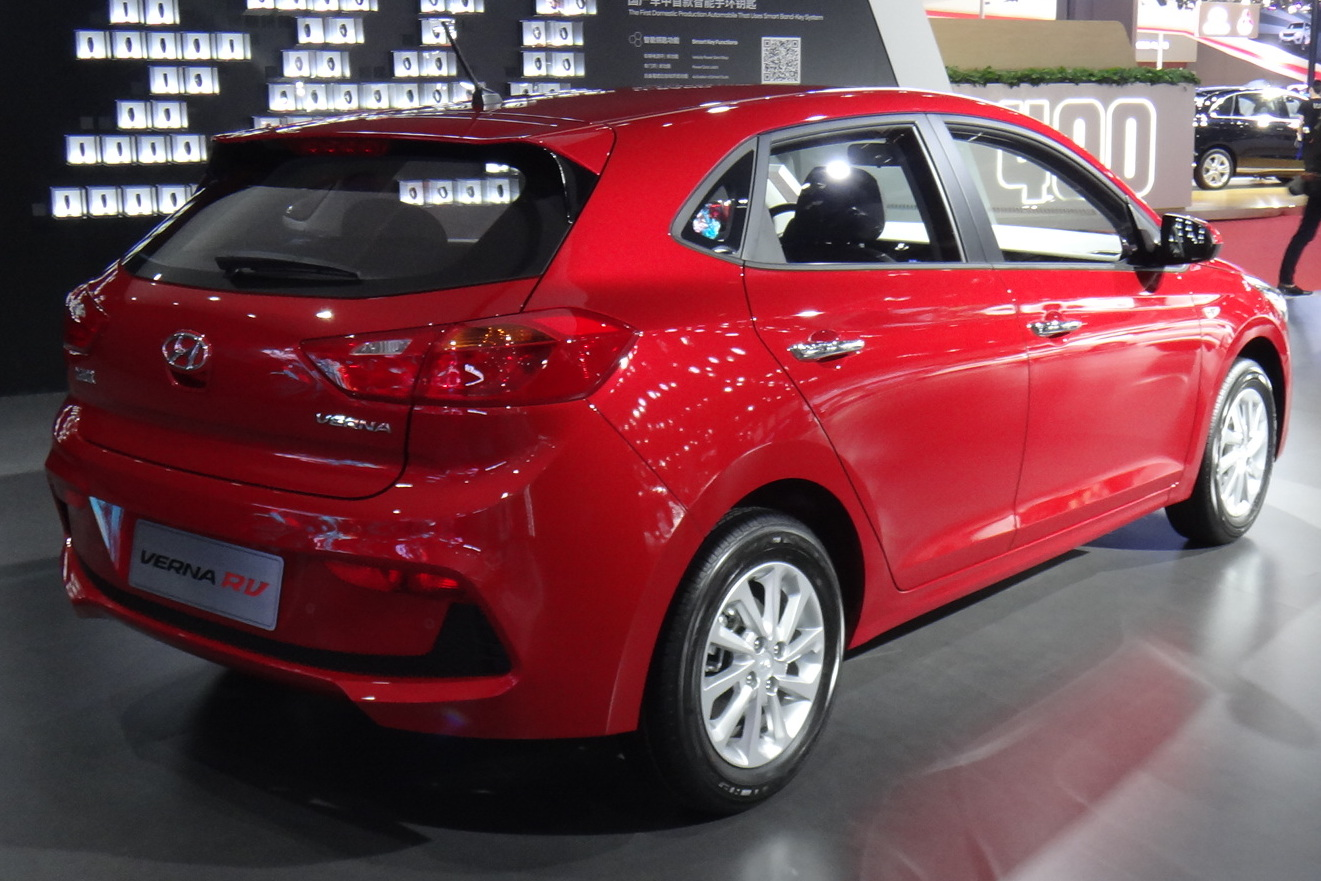
2017 Hyundai Verna RV (YC; pre-facelift, China)

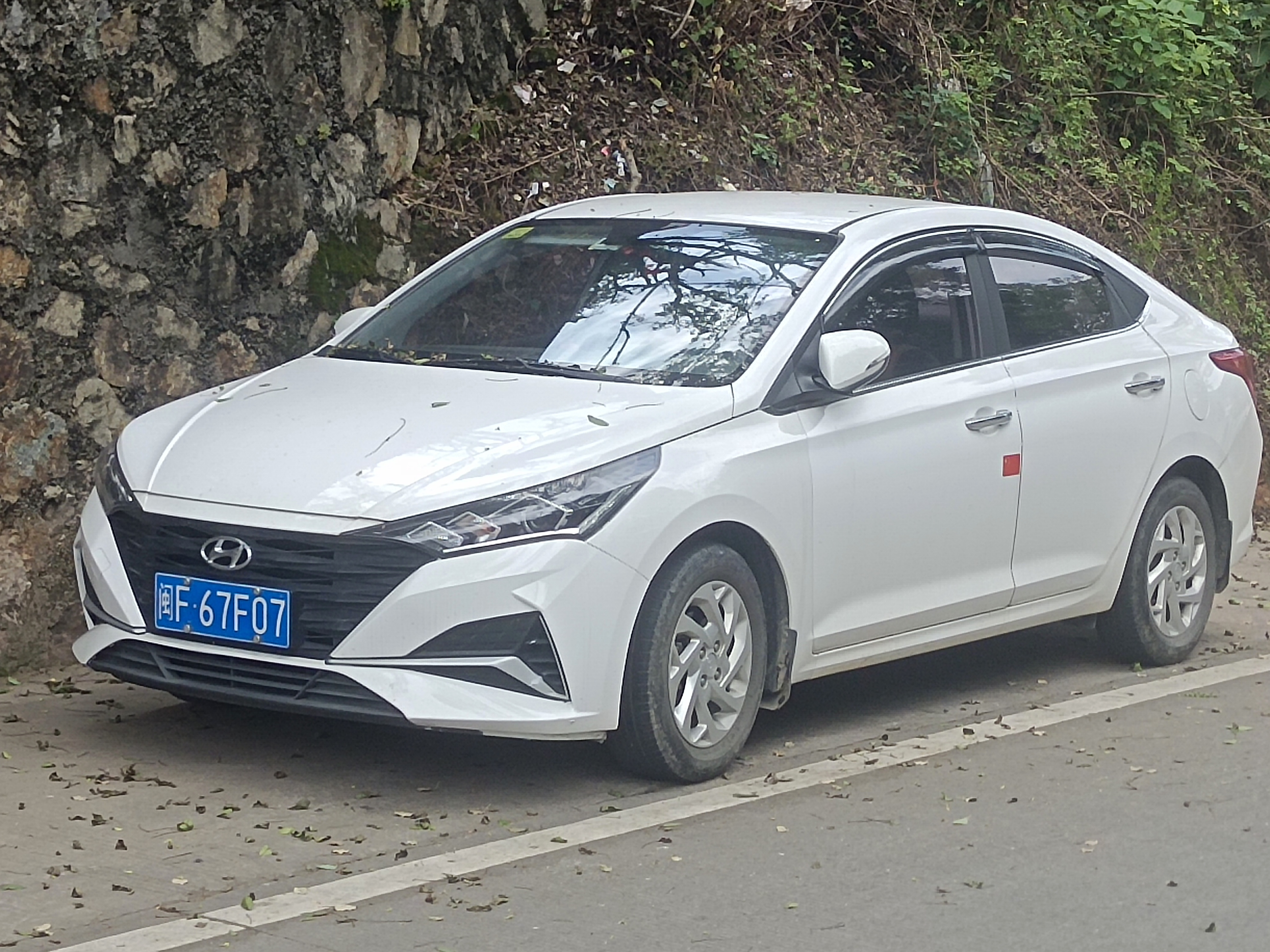
2021 Hyundai Verna (YC; facelift, China)

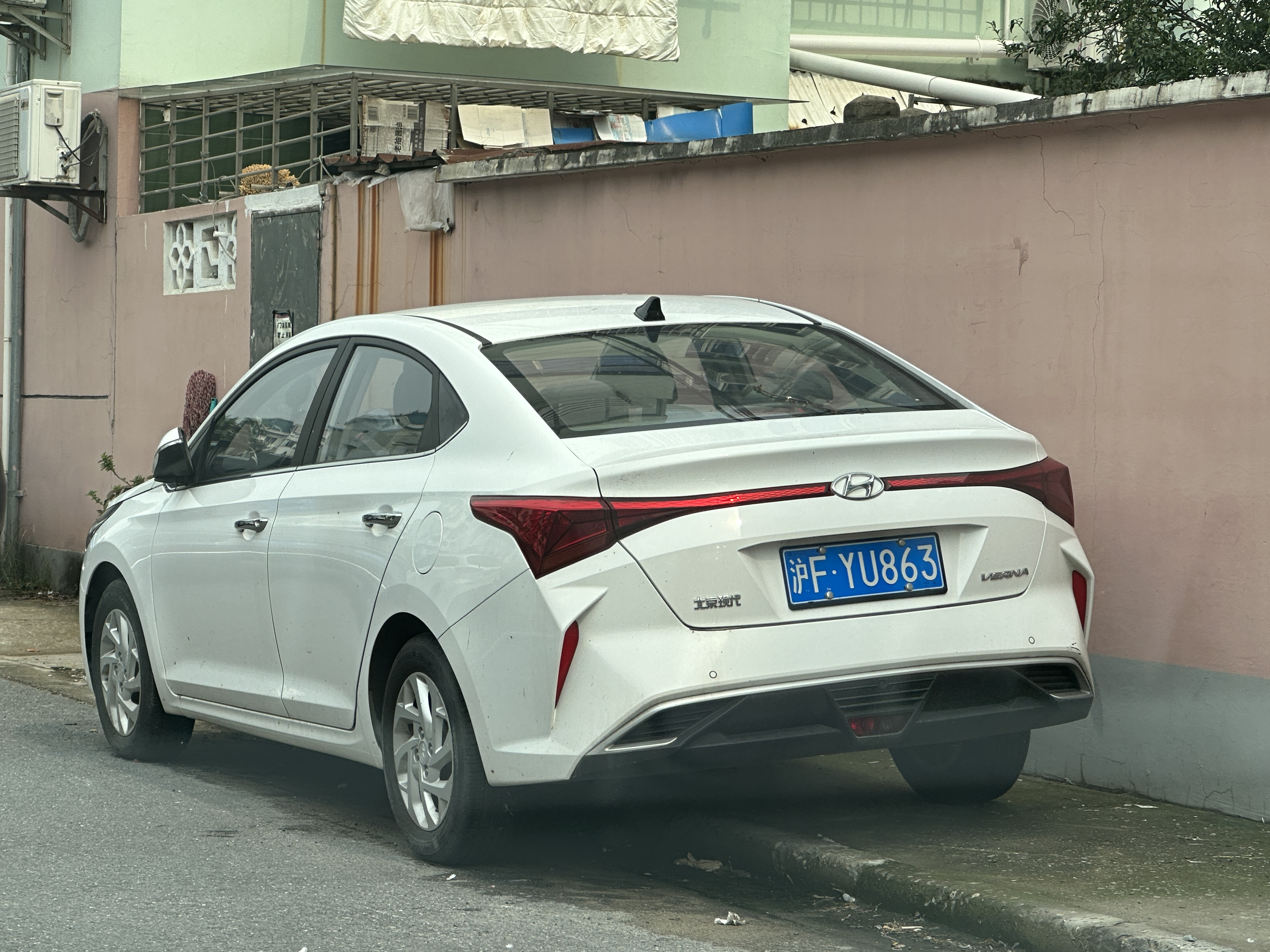
2021 Hyundai Verna (YC; facelift, China)

=== Powertrain ===
Model	Years	Transmission	Power	Torque	0–100 km/h (0–62 mph) (official)	Top speed
Petrol
1.0 L Kappa II T-GDi	2017–2023	7-speed DCT	120 PS (88 kW; 118 hp) at 6,000 rpm	17.5 kg⋅m (172 N⋅m; 127 lbf⋅ft) at 1,500–4,000 rpm		
1.4 L Kappa II MPi	2017–2023	6-speed manual	100 PS (74 kW; 99 hp) at 6,000 rpm	13.5 kg⋅m (132 N⋅m; 98 lbf⋅ft) at 4,000 rpm	12.2s	185 km/h (115 mph)
1.4 L Kappa II MPi	2017–2023	6-speed automatic	100 PS (74 kW; 99 hp) at 6,000 rpm	13.5 kg⋅m (132 N⋅m; 98 lbf⋅ft) at 4,000 rpm	13.4s	183 km/h (114 mph)
1.5 L Smartstream MPi	2017–2023	6-speed manual	115 PS (85 kW; 113 hp) at 6,300 rpm	14.7 kg⋅m (144 N⋅m; 106 lbf⋅ft) at 4,500 rpm		
1.5 L Smartstream MPi	2017–2023	CVT	115 PS (85 kW; 113 hp) at 6,300 rpm	14.7 kg⋅m (144 N⋅m; 106 lbf⋅ft) at 4,500 rpm		
1.6 L Gamma II MPi	2017–2023	6-speed manual	123 PS (90 kW; 121 hp) at 6,300 rpm	15.4 kg⋅m (151 N⋅m; 111 lbf⋅ft) at 4,850 rpm	10.3s	193 km/h (120 mph)
1.6 L Gamma II MPi	2017–2023	6-speed automatic	123 PS (90 kW; 121 hp) at 6,300 rpm	15.4 kg⋅m (151 N⋅m; 111 lbf⋅ft) at 4,850 rpm	11.3s	192 km/h (119 mph)
1.6 L Gamma II MPi	2017–2023	CVT	123 PS (90 kW; 121 hp) at 6,300 rpm	15.4 kg⋅m (151 N⋅m; 111 lbf⋅ft) at 4,850 rpm		
1.6 L Gamma II GDi	2017–2023	6-speed manual	132 PS (97 kW; 130 hp) at 6,300 rpm	16.4 kg⋅m (161 N⋅m; 119 lbf⋅ft) at 4,850 rpm	10.1s	196 km/h (122 mph)
1.6 L Gamma II GDi	2017–2023	6-speed automatic	132 PS (97 kW; 130 hp) at 6,300 rpm	16.4 kg⋅m (161 N⋅m; 119 lbf⋅ft) at 4,850 rpm	10.5s	194 km/h (121 mph)
1.6 L Smartstream DPi	2020–2022	6-speed manual	122 PS (90 kW; 120 hp) at 6,300 rpm	15.6 kg⋅m (153 N⋅m; 113 lbf⋅ft) at 4,500 rpm		
1.6 L Smartstream DPi	2020–2022	CVT	122 PS (90 kW; 120 hp) at 6,300 rpm	15.6 kg⋅m (153 N⋅m; 113 lbf⋅ft) at 4,500 rpm		
Diesel
1.5 L U II CRDi	2017–2023	6-speed manual	115 PS (85 kW; 113 hp) at 4,000 rpm	25.5 kg⋅m (250 N⋅m; 184 lbf⋅ft) at 1,500–2,750 rpm		
1.5 L U II CRDi	2017–2023	6-speed automatic	115 PS (85 kW; 113 hp) at 4,000 rpm	25.5 kg⋅m (250 N⋅m; 184 lbf⋅ft) at 1,500–2,750 rpm		

=== Safety ===
==== Latin NCAP ====
The Accent made in Mexico o India in its most basic Latin American market configuration with 1 airbag, driver load limiter, and no ESC received 0 stars from Latin NCAP 3.0 in 2021 (similar to Euro NCAP 2014).

Latin NCAP 3.0 test results Hyundai Accent + 1 Airbag (2021, similar to Euro NCAP 2014)
Test	Points	%
Overall:	0 /5 stars	
Adult occupant:	3.69	9%
Child occupant:	6.21	13%
Pedestrian:	25.49	53%
Safety assist:	3.00	7%

==== IIHS ====
===== 2019 =====
Insurance Institute for Highway Safety (IIHS) was safety tested by IIHS in 2018 and its top trim received a Top Safety Pick award:

IIHS Hyundai Accent scores:
Small overlap front: driver-side	Good	
Small overlap front: passenger-side	Acceptable	
Moderate overlap frontal offset	Good	
Side (original test)	Good	
Roof strength	Good	
Head restraints & seats	Good	
Headlights	Acceptable / Poor	varies by trim/option
Front crash prevention (Vehicle-to-Vehicle)	Superior	optional
Child seat anchors (LATCH) ease of use	Acceptable	

===== 2022 =====
The 2022 Accent was tested by the IIHS:

IIHS Hyundai Accent scores
Small overlap front (Driver)	Good	
Small overlap front (Passenger)	Acceptable	
Moderate overlap front	Good	
Side (original test)	Good	
Roof strength	Good	
Head restraints and seats	Good	
Headlights	Acceptable / Poor	varies by trim/option
Front crash prevention (Vehicle-to-Vehicle)	Superior	optional
Child seat anchors (LATCH) ease of use	Acceptable	

== Sixth generation (BN7; 2023) ==
Sixth generation
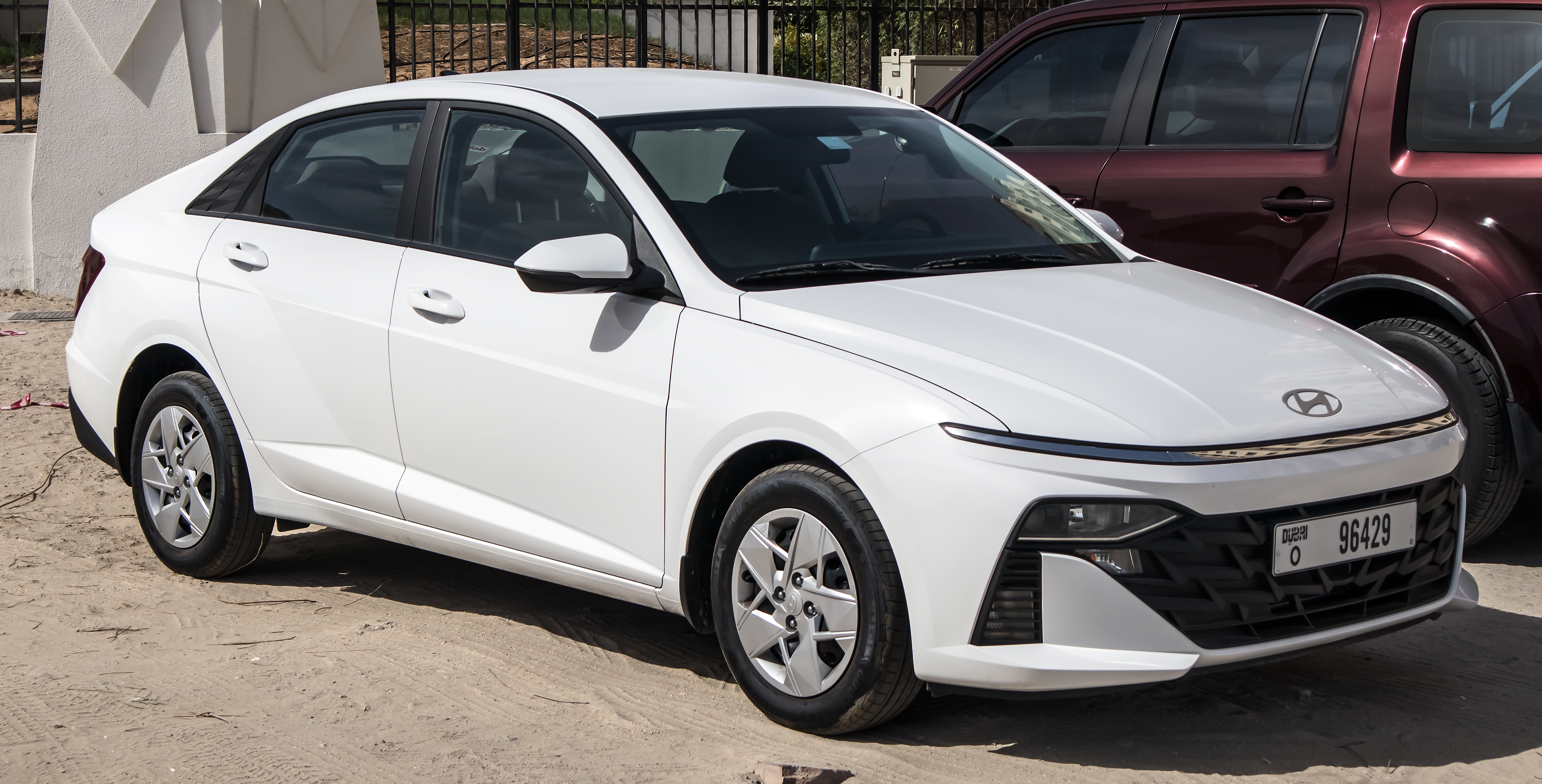
- Hyundai Accent Smart+ (UAE)

Overview
- Model code: BN7
- Also called: Hyundai Verna
- Production: 2023–present
- Assembly: India: Chennai (HMIL); Vietnam: Ninh Bình (HTMV)
- Designer: Min-chul Koo

Body and chassis
- Body style: 4-door sedan
- Related: Kia K3 (BL7)

Powertrain
- Engine: Petrol: 1.5 L Smartstream G1.5 MPi I4; 1.5 L Smartstream G1.5 T-GDi I4
- Transmission: 6-speed manual; 7-speed DCT; CVT

Dimensions
- Wheelbase: 2,670 mm (105.1 in)
- Length: 4,535 mm (178.5 in)
- Width: 1,765 mm (69.5 in)
- Height: 1,475 mm (58.1 in)

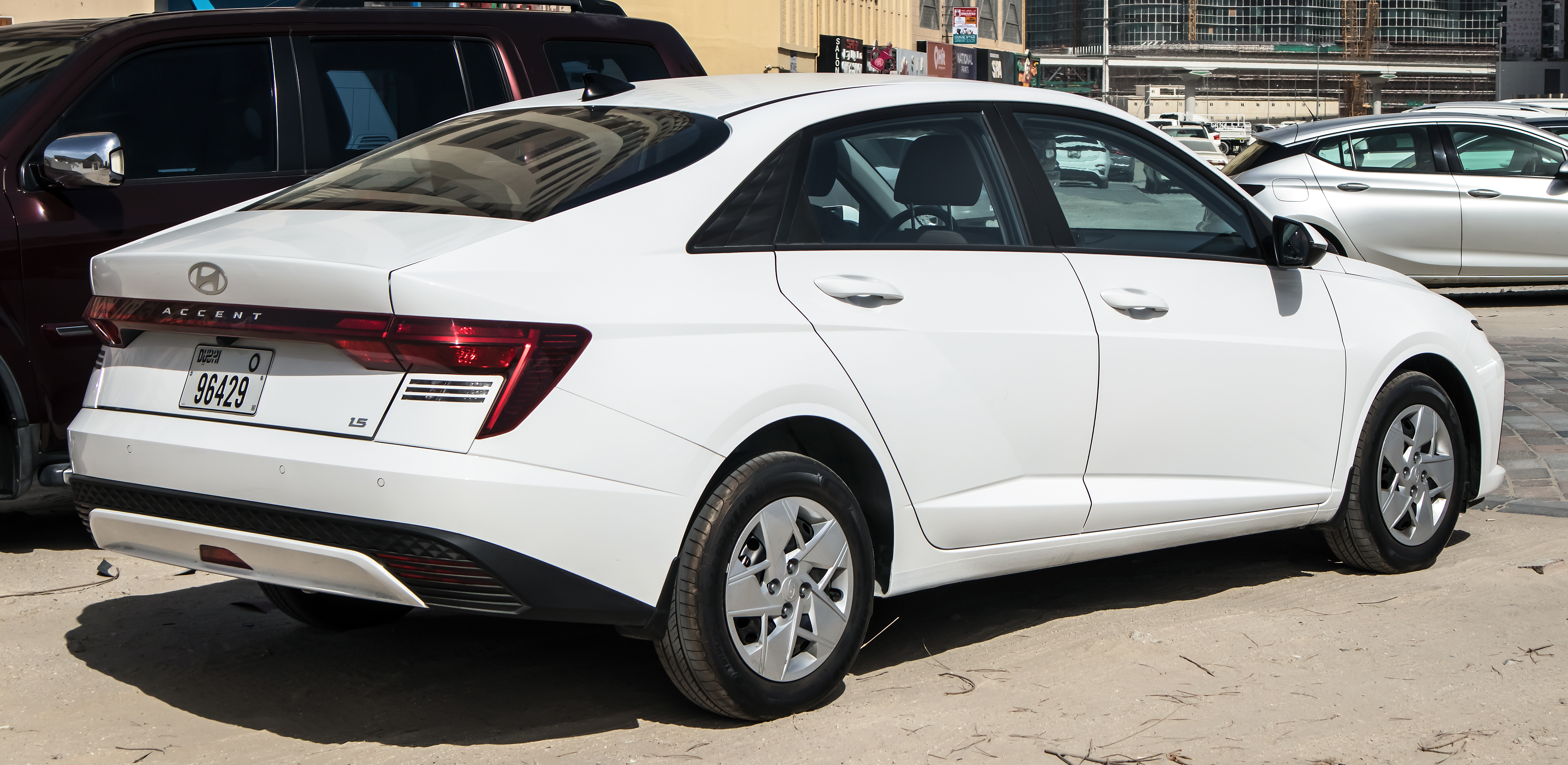
Rear view

On 13 February 2023, Hyundai released the sixth-generation model in India, where it is called the Verna. Hyundai refers to the new design language as 'Sensuous Sportiness'. Its design is inspired by the Elantra with a wide LED light bar reminiscent of the Kona crossover, Staria minivan, Stargazer MPV, Grandeur sedan, and the Sonata facelift.

The model is offered with a 1.5-litre naturally aspirated petrol engine that makes 115 PS (113 hp; 85 kW) and 144 N⋅m (14.7 kg⋅m; 106 lb⋅ft) of torque and a 1.5-litre turbo-petrol unit capable of developing 160 PS (158 hp; 118 kW) and 253 N⋅m (25.8 kg⋅m; 187 lb⋅ft) of torque.

=== 2026 facelift ===
The Verna facelift was revealed in India on 9 March 2026.

The exterior features a redesigned bumper, larger grille, dual LED projector headlamps, and a revised lighting layout, while the connected LED light bar stays. The car also gets new alloy wheel designs and a refreshed rear bumper.

Inside, it was updated with a new steering wheel with the 4-dot logo, a fully digital driver display, better seat upholstery, and more convenience features. For higher trims it also get electrically adjustable seats, a rear sunshade, and a smart trunk.

=== Markets ===
==== India ====
The sixth-generation Verna was launched in India on 21 March 2023. It is available in multiple variants including EX, S, SX, SX(O) for the 1.5L NA petrol (manual or IVT), and S(O) Turbo, SX Turbo, SX(O) Turbo for the 1.5L turbo-petrol (DCT). A new SX+ variant was added in June 2025.

==== Brunei ====
The fifth-generation Verna has been launched in Brunei on 30 May 2025 and is only offered in one variant: Standard with the 1.5-litre naturally-aspirated petrol engine with CVT.

==== Vietnam ====
The sixth-generation Accent was introduced in Vietnam on 30 May 2024 and is offered in three grade levels; Standard, Premium and Special. It is paired with the 1.5-litre naturally-aspirated petrol engine paired with 6-speed manual on the former, and CVT on the latter three.

==== United Arab Emirates ====
The sixth-generation Accent was launched in the UAE in early 2025, offered in variants such as Smart and Premium with the 1.5L naturally aspirated petrol engine and CVT.

=== Powertrain ===
Model	Years	Transmission	Power	Torque	0–100 km/h (0–62 mph) (official)
Petrol
Smartstream G1.5 MPi	2023–present	6-speed manual CVT	115 PS (85 kW; 113 hp) at 6,300 rpm	14.7 kg⋅m (144 N⋅m; 106 lbf⋅ft) at 4,500 rpm	
Smartstream G1.5 T-GDi	2023–present	6-speed manual 7-speed DCT	160 PS (118 kW; 158 hp) at 5,500 rpm	25.8 kg⋅m (253 N⋅m; 187 lbf⋅ft) at 1,500–3,500 rpm	8.1s

=== Safety ===
The 2023 Hyundai Verna sold in India is fitted as standard with six airbags, seatbelt reminders for all seats, electronic stability control, i-Size compatible ISOFIX anchorages, three-point seatbelts for all seats and a tyre pressure monitor. Advanced driver assistance technologies are optional. In October 2023 the Verna became the first Hyundai model sold in India to receive a 5-star rating for adults and 5 stars for toddlers from Global NCAP 2.0 (similar to Latin NCAP 2016). However, the car's rear seatbelt reminders were deemed non-compliant with Global NCAP's criteria and testers marked down the result of the frontal offset test for signs of failure of the car's load paths, citing questionable repeatability of the low fascia and footwell intrusion recorded in the test.

Global NCAP 2.0 test results (India) Hyundai Verna (2023, similar to Latin NCAP 2016)
Test	Score	Stars
Adult occupant protection	28.18/34.00	5 /5 stars
Child occupant protection	42.00/49.00	5 /5 stars

Bharat NCAP test results Hyundai Verna (2026, based on Latin NCAP 2016)
Test	Score	Stars
Adult occupant protection	28.22/32.00	5 /5 stars
Child occupant protection	44.00/49.00	5 /5 stars

== Motorsport ==
=== WRC ===
Hyundai's Accent World Rally Car, Accent WRC, competed in an official capacity, spawning three generations, in the World Rally Championship from 2000 to 2003.

=== Junior Formula series ===
In India, Hyundai was the sole engine supplier for Formula LGB Hyundai, built by the Chain and Sprocket giant LGB. The single make series is promoted at grassroots level acting as a launch pad for future Formula One hopefuls. The Accent engine is supplied in Stock form albeit after some engine control unit modifications.

=== X3 Excel in Australia ===
In Australia, the X3 Accent was sold as the Hyundai Excel. It is used in the Excel Rally Series, beginning in 2005. There are restrictions on modifications to the vehicle to reduce cost and encourage competition.

Similarly in 2010, a circuit racing competition began in Queensland called Excel Cup and soon after in South Australia called Circuit Excels. The class has since spread to all six states with several hundred race cars built nationally under rules managed by the Circuit Excel Racing Association. A single event nationals has been created to bring all six states together for a single race meeting annually. They are the cheapest racing class in Australia based on a production road car.

== Sales ==
Starting 2023, the Accent became the best-selling car in Saudi Arabia.

Year	United States	Canada	South Korea	China	Russia	Vietnam	Philippines	Saudi Arabia
2002	71,488							
2003	56,585							
2004	43,258	19,172						
2005	41,012	15,679						
2006	34,735	17,784					23,027	
2007	36,735	16,390		26,548			19,621	
2008	50,431	29,751		24,628			630	
2009	68,086	25,220		60,379			2,027	
2010	51,975	24,017		112,822			18,917	
2011	55,601	22,280	23,923	158,082	97,243		12,382	
2012	61,004	22,581	30,527	206,790	110,776		16,839	
2013	60,458	18,884	28,604	199,065	113,991		10,510	
2014	63,309	23,173	23,206	236,024	114,644		11,481	45,734
2015	61,486	19,371	18,267	213,678	115,868		6,855	49,886
2016	73,766	19,198	12,430	156,902	90,380		11,325	53,032
2017	58,955	13,073	7,493	99,542	68,614		16,454	29,703
2018	29,090	7,067	5,698	35,821	65,581		15,041	22,523
2019	25,628	5,989	4,094	37,549	58,682	19,719	9,574	41,661
2020	15,975	3,018		27,156	49,280	21,602	4,381	21,999
2021	19,614			16,996	61,061	19,956	3,272	34,987
2022	17,823					22,645	337	17,891
2023	31					17,452		31,359
2024						13,538		39,910
2025								46,009

== See also ==
- List of Hyundai vehicles
