= VIS-AVTO =

Russian truck manufacturer

JSC for the Production of Special Vehicles VIS-AVTO (JSC PSA VIS-AVTO)
- Native name: АО ПСА (ПРОИЗВОДСТВО СПЕЦИАЛЬНЫХ АВТОМОБИЛЕЙ) ВИС-АВТО
- Formerly: CJSC VAZInterServices
- Type: Subsidiary
- Industry: Automotive
- Founded: 1991; 35 years ago
- Headquarters: Tolyatti, Samara Oblast, Russia
- Key people: Eugene Rothman (President)
- Products: Light commercial vehicles, vehicle conversion
- Revenue: ▼1,263.98 million ₽ (2020)
- Operating income: ▲ ₽139.97 million (2020)
- Net income: ▲ ₽111.70 million (2020)
- Total assets: ▲ ₽1,031.82 million (2020)
- Total equity: ▲ ₽202.93 million (2020)
- Parent: AvtoVAZ

VIS-AVTO (Russian: ВИС-АВТО), originally called VAZInterServices (Russian: ВАЗинтерСервис), is a Russian company owned by AvtoVAZ and focused on the manufacturing of Lada-based light commercial vehicles and vehicle conversion. A spin-off company of VAZInterServices, called also VAZInterServices or VIS (Russian: ВИС), specialises in auto parts and is controlled by United Automotive Technologies. Both VIS-AVTO and VIS are headquartered in Tolyatti, Samara Oblast.

== History ==
VAZInterservices (VIS) logo

VAZInterServices was founded in 1991 to produce parts for Lada cars and a pick-up truck based on them. In 2003, the company became part of the SOK Group. In 2008, the Russian government took control of VAZInterServices and other SOK Group assets by force. In 2010, the control of VAZInterServices was transferred from AvtoVAZ to United Automotive Technologies, a holding company focused on supplying other manufacturers, after it acquired a majority of SOK Group's VIS-Trust group, which included VAZInterServices. In 2011, AvtoVAZ bought VAZInterServices' vehicle manufacturing division. By 2013, it mostly finished the process of merging PSA Bronto into VAZInterServices, renaming it VIS-AVTO.

From October 2014 to April 2015, VIS-AVTO assembled the Lada Niva Urban for its parent AvtoVAZ. In 2021, it began producing a Bronto-badged Lada Niva Legend. VIS-AVTO and AvtoVAZ partnered on production, with the former taking charge of main assembly and the latter of welding and painting.

VIS operates as a supplier of auto parts, mainly for AvtoVAZ. As of 2018, it is one of the nine companies of the United Automotive Technologies group.

== Operations ==
Since starting operations in 1991, VIS-AVTO has produced commercial vehicles (pickup trucks and vans) based on the Lada 2105 and Lada 2107 (VIS-2345, VIS-23452, VIS-23454, VIS-234500-30); Lada Samara (VIS-1705, VIS-1706, VIS-2347, VIS-23472); others. As of 2021, it produces commercial vehicles of up to 720 kilogrames payload based on the Lada Granta and Lada Largus, as well as Bronto-badged variants of the Lada Niva. Its Tolyatti plant has buildings covering 9,440 m^{2} and can modify about 3,500 vehicles per year.

VIS also has a plant in Tolyatti. As of March 2016, it had 971 employees.

== Gallery ==
Pick-Ups

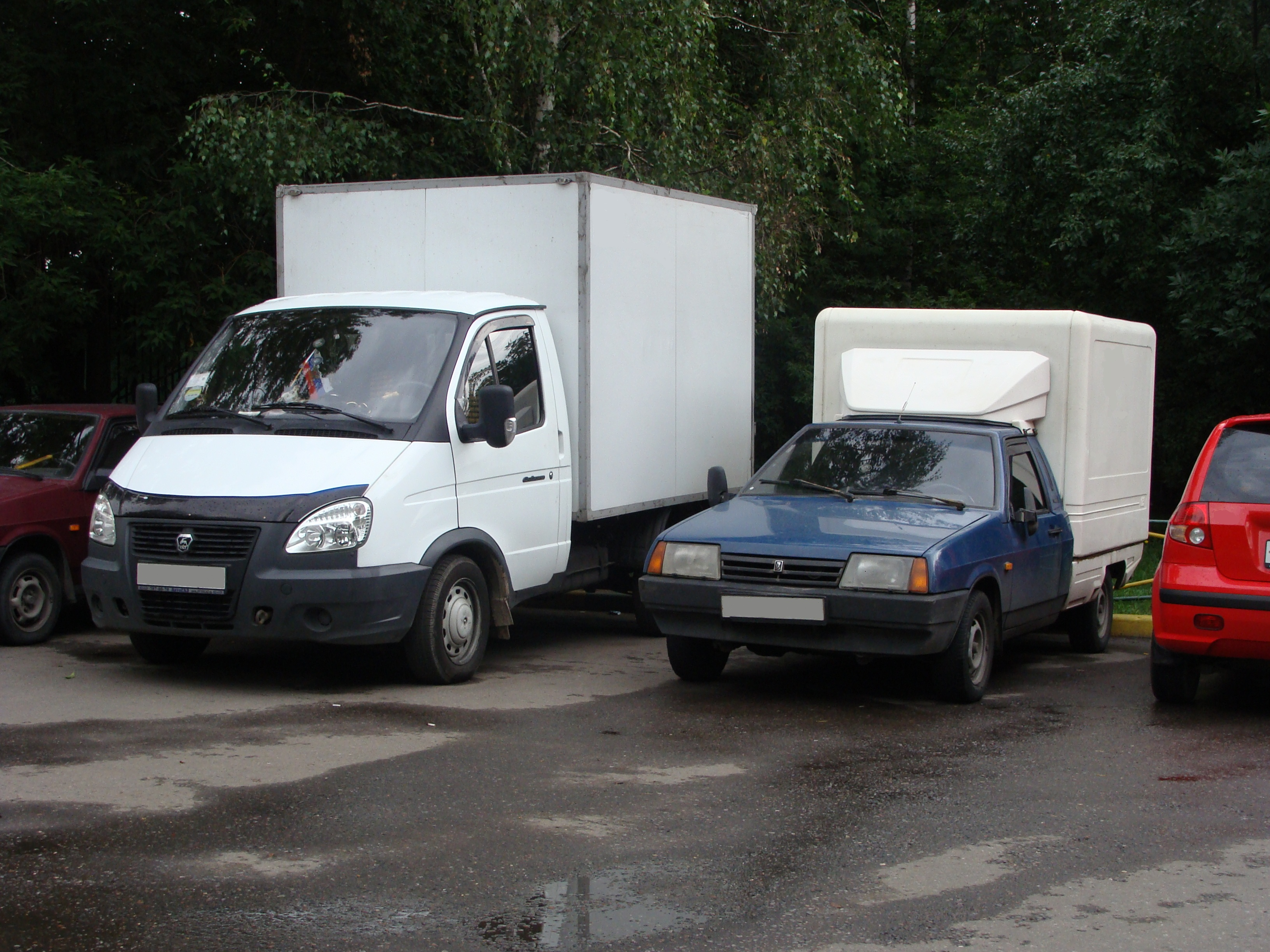
VIS and Sobol pickups comparison.

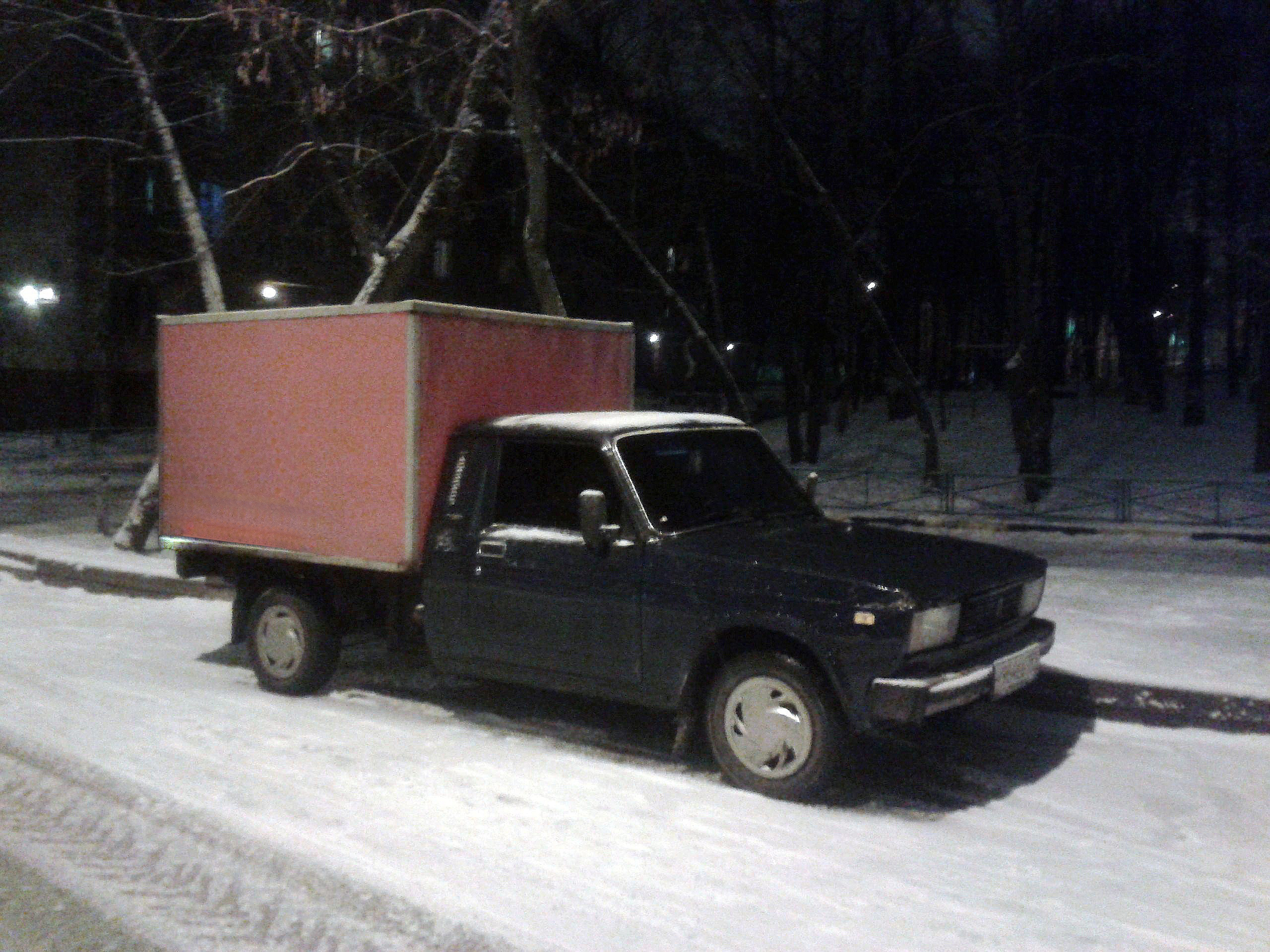
VIS-234500

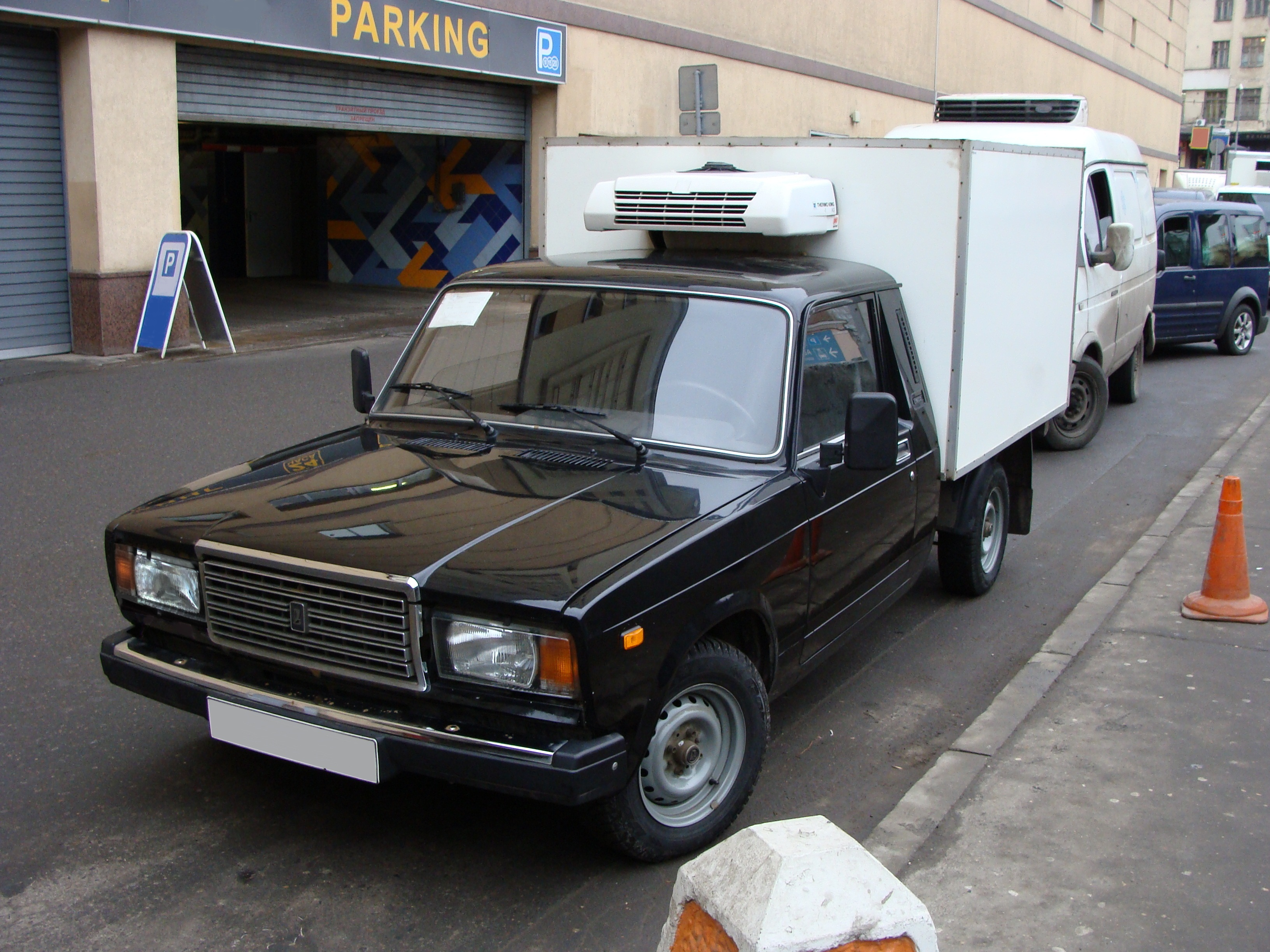
VIS-234500-30

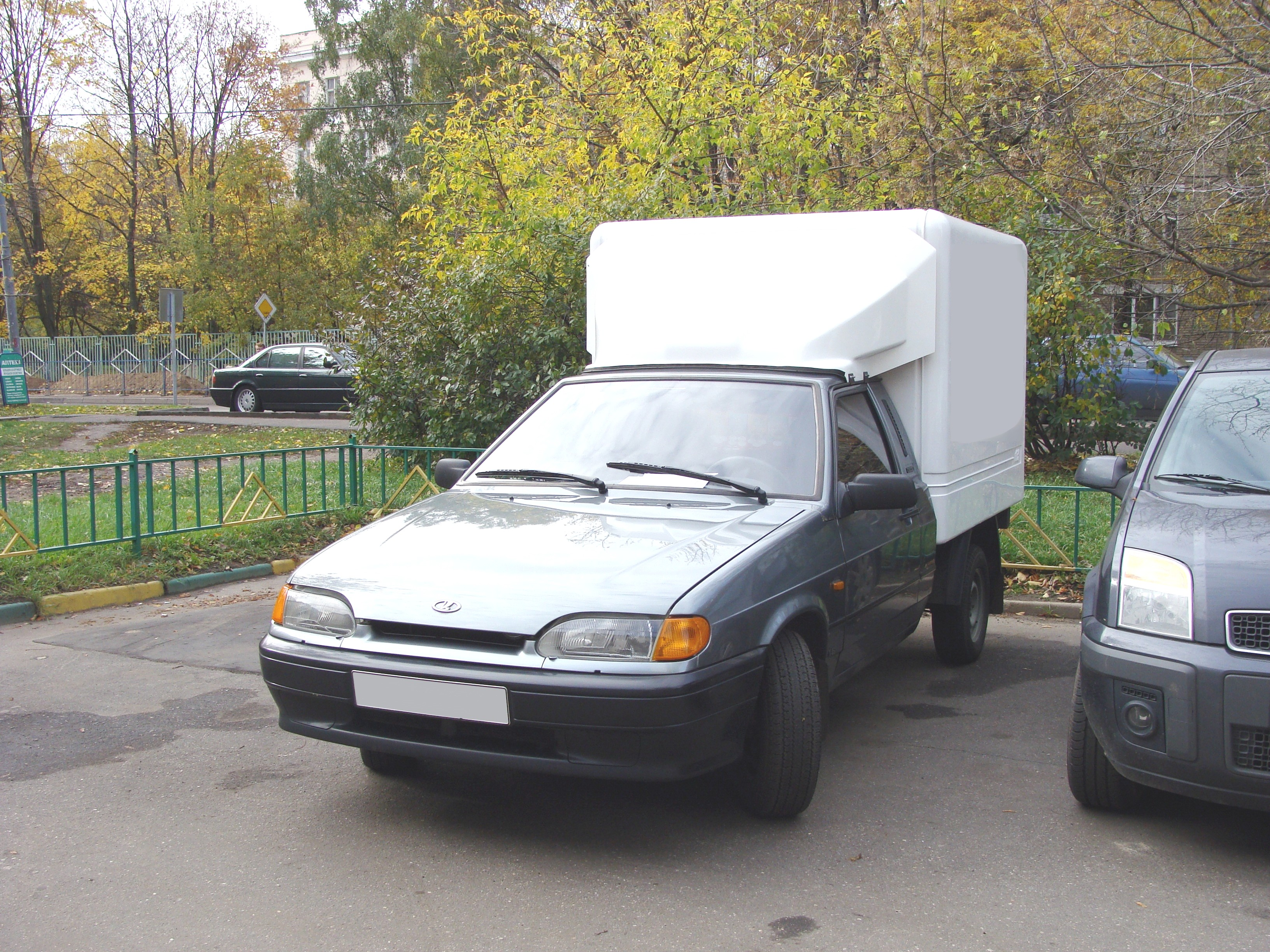
VIS-234700-30

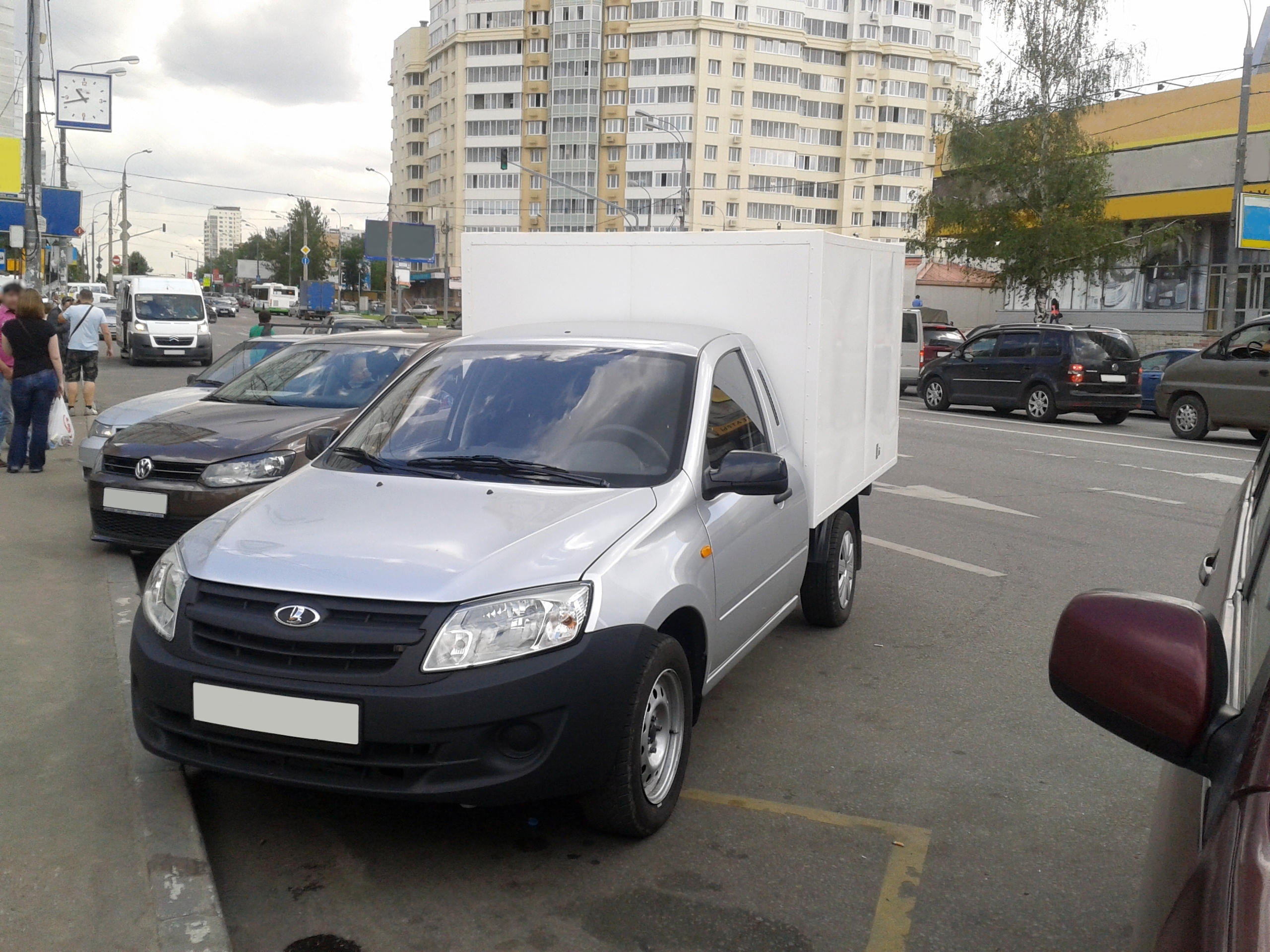
VIS-234900-40

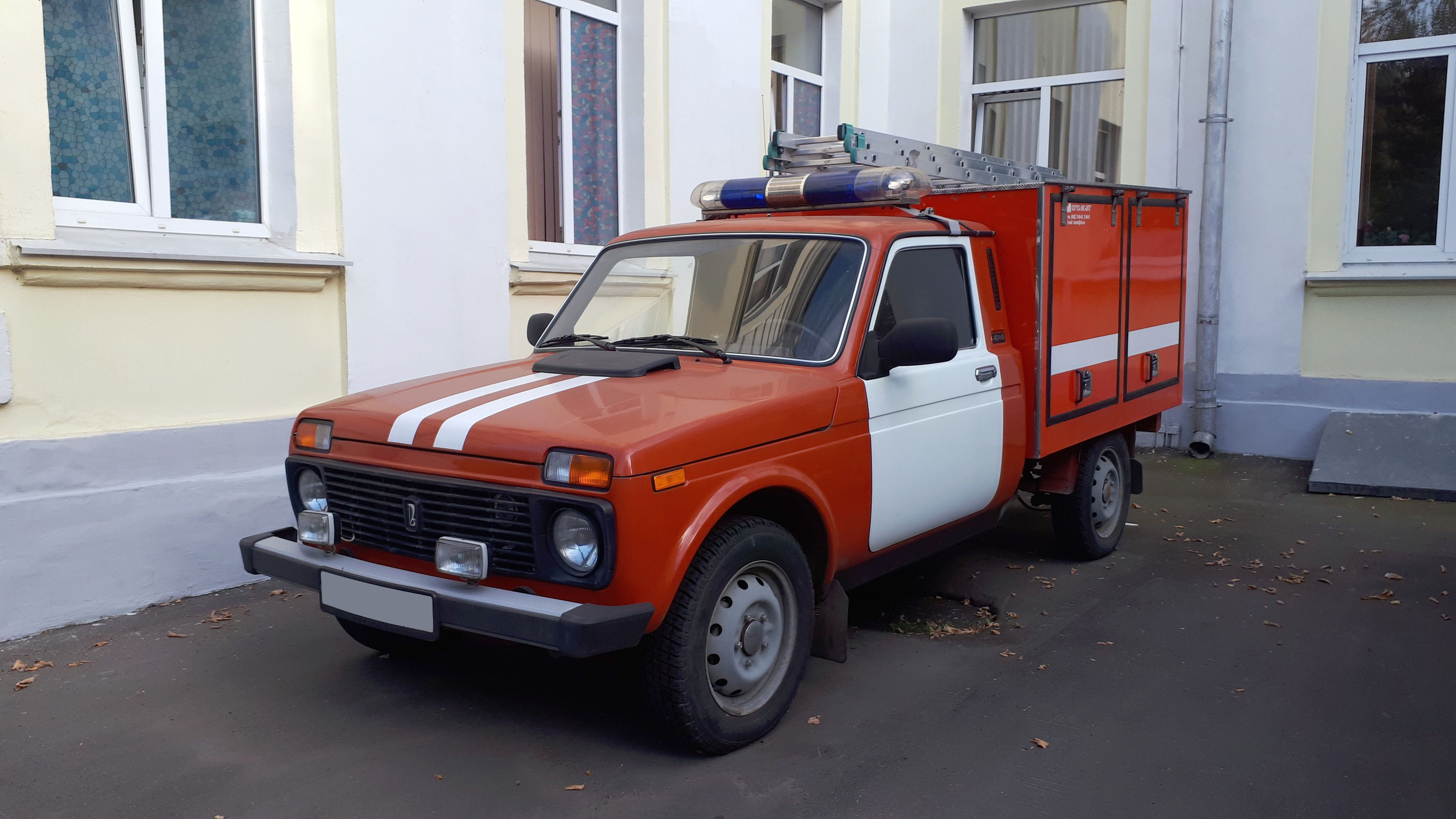
VIS-294601

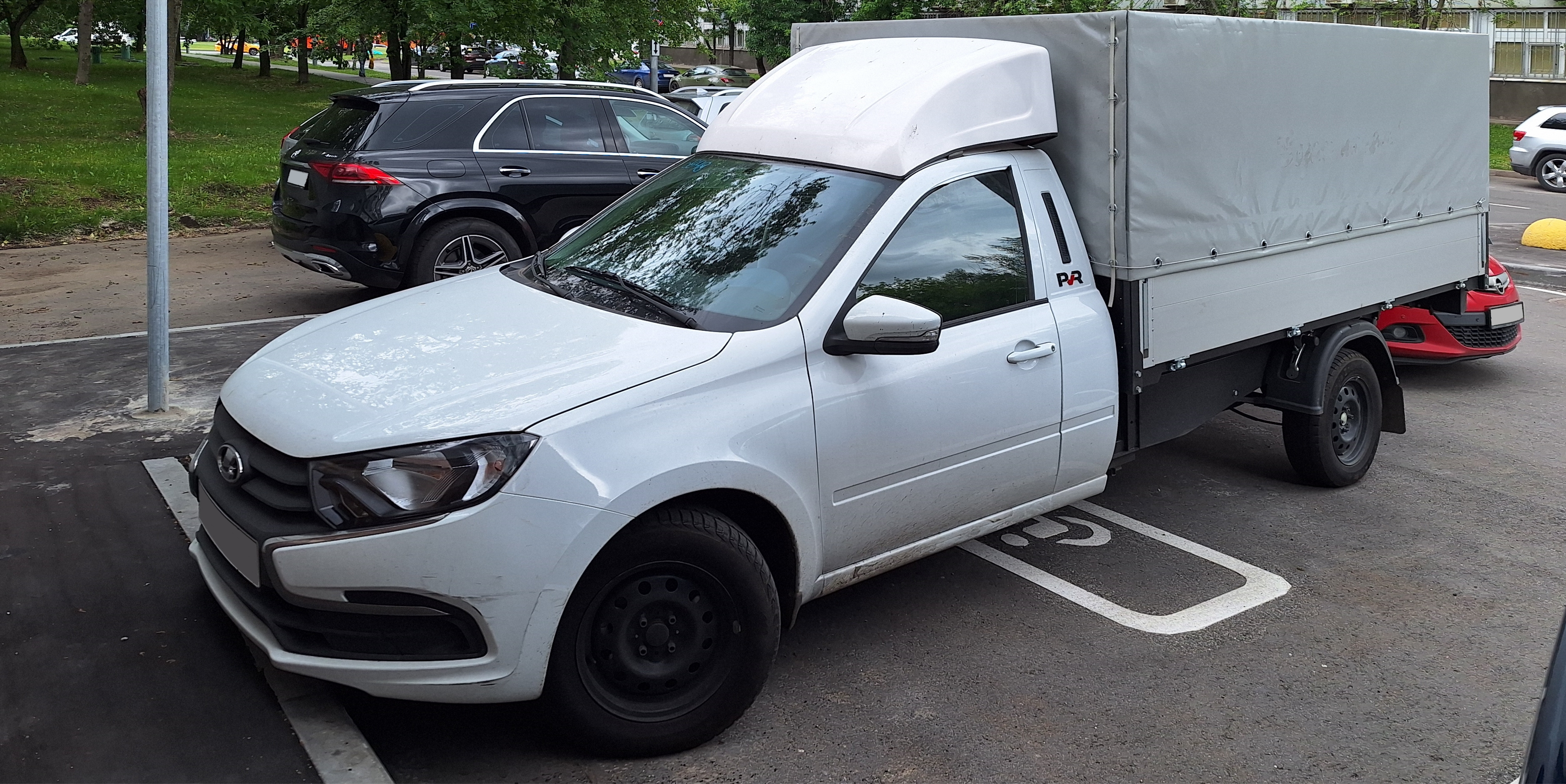
PVR-235700 (Long VIS-234900)
