= Saaz Komplekt =

Russian automotive component factory

SAAZ Komplekt LLC
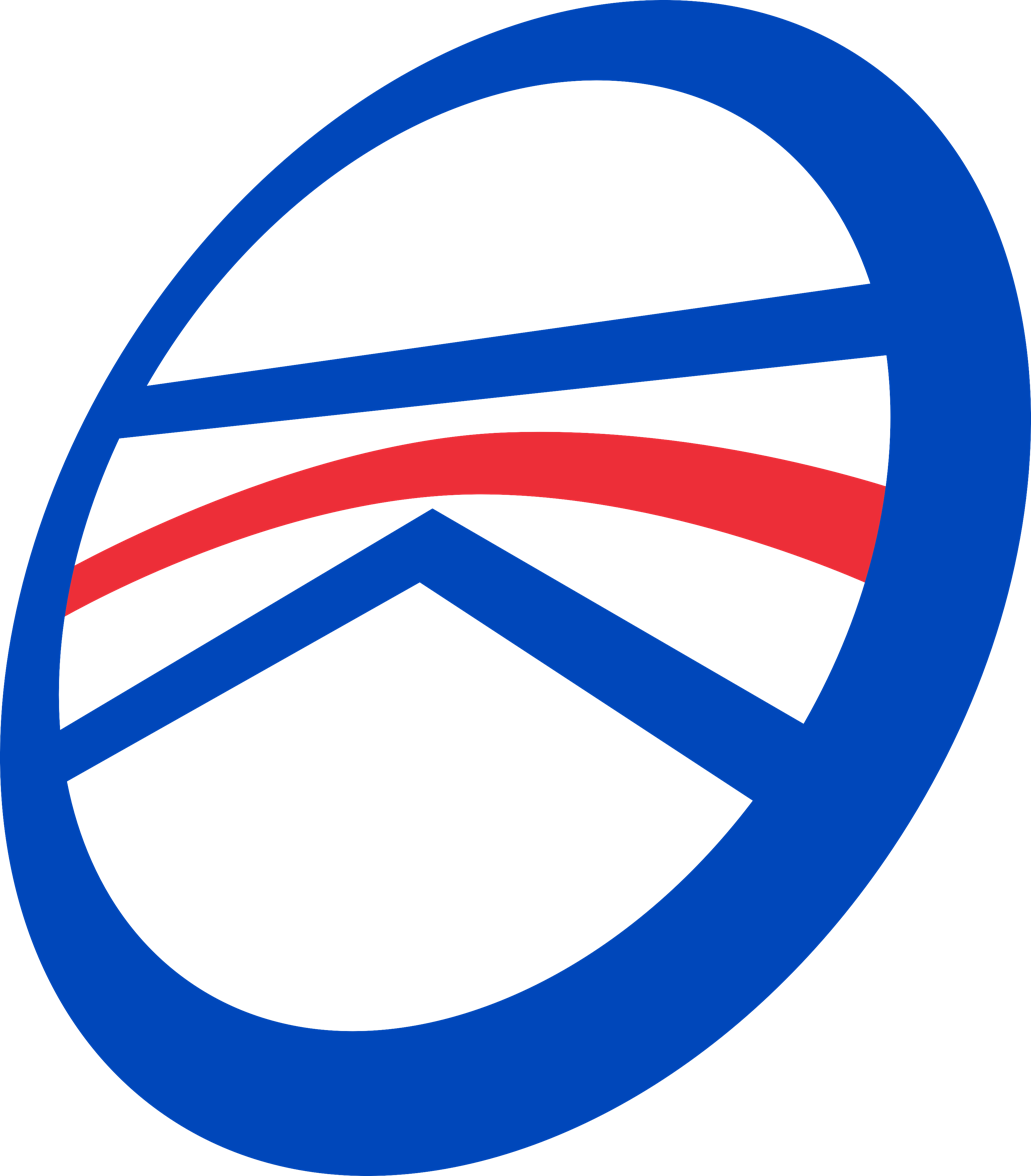
- Native name: ООО СААЗ Комплект
- Company type: Subsidiary
- Industry: Automotive
- Founded: 1962
- Headquarters: Skopin, Russia
- Products: Automotive components
- Parent: United Automotive Technologies
- Website: saaz.ru

SAAZ Komplekt (Russian: СААЗ Комплект), formerly known as Skopinsky Auto-Aggregate Plant (Russian: Скопинский Автоагрегатный Завод, romanized: Skopinskiy Avtoagregatnyy Zavod) is a Russian factory of automotive components (telescopic struts, shock absorbers, pneumatic stops and gas springs). The company was established in 1962 and is a supplier of products for conveyors of AvtoVAZ, UAZ and others.

The company is controlled by United Automotive Technologies, a holding of auto parts manufacturers.

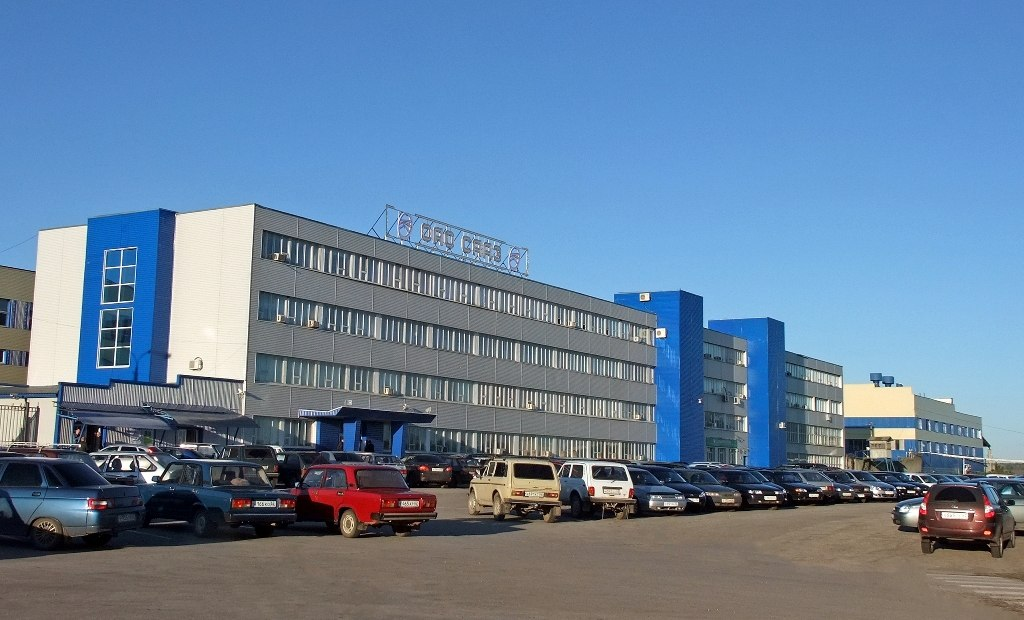
Administrative building
