= Lada Samara =

Range of supermini cars produced by Lada (1984-2013)

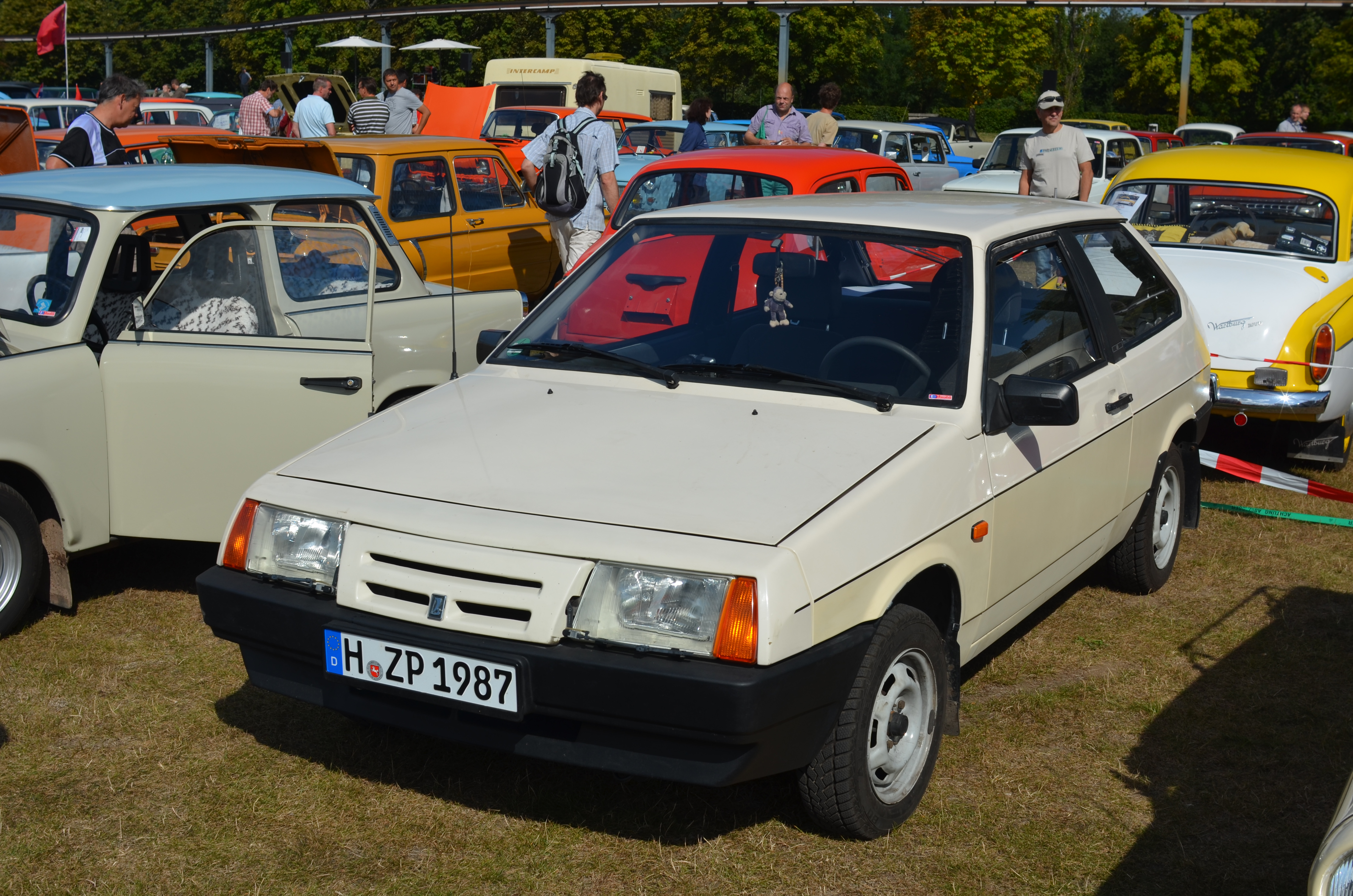
- VAZ 2108 (pre-facelift)

Overview
- Manufacturer: Lada (AvtoVAZ)
- Production: 1984–2013

Body and chassis
- Class: Small family car (C)
- Related: ZAZ Tavria

Chronology
- Predecessor: VAZ-2105 (or Lada Riva)
- Successor: Lada Priora

The VAZ-2108, known as the Lada Samara in much of Western Europe, is a series of small family cars produced by Soviet/Russian vehicle manufacturer AvtoVAZ under the Lada brand between 1984 and 2013.

The model name Samara originally was used only for exported models, in the Soviet Union the same model was called Sputnik ("fellow traveler", "satellite") until 1991, when the sedan version of the Samara entered in production, using the export name.

It was the first front-wheel drive serial car built in the Soviet Union since the LuAZ-969V. The Samara was repeatedly modified and restyled during the years of production before it was finally discontinued in December 2013.

== VAZ-2108 (1984) ==
VAZ 2108 / Lada Samara
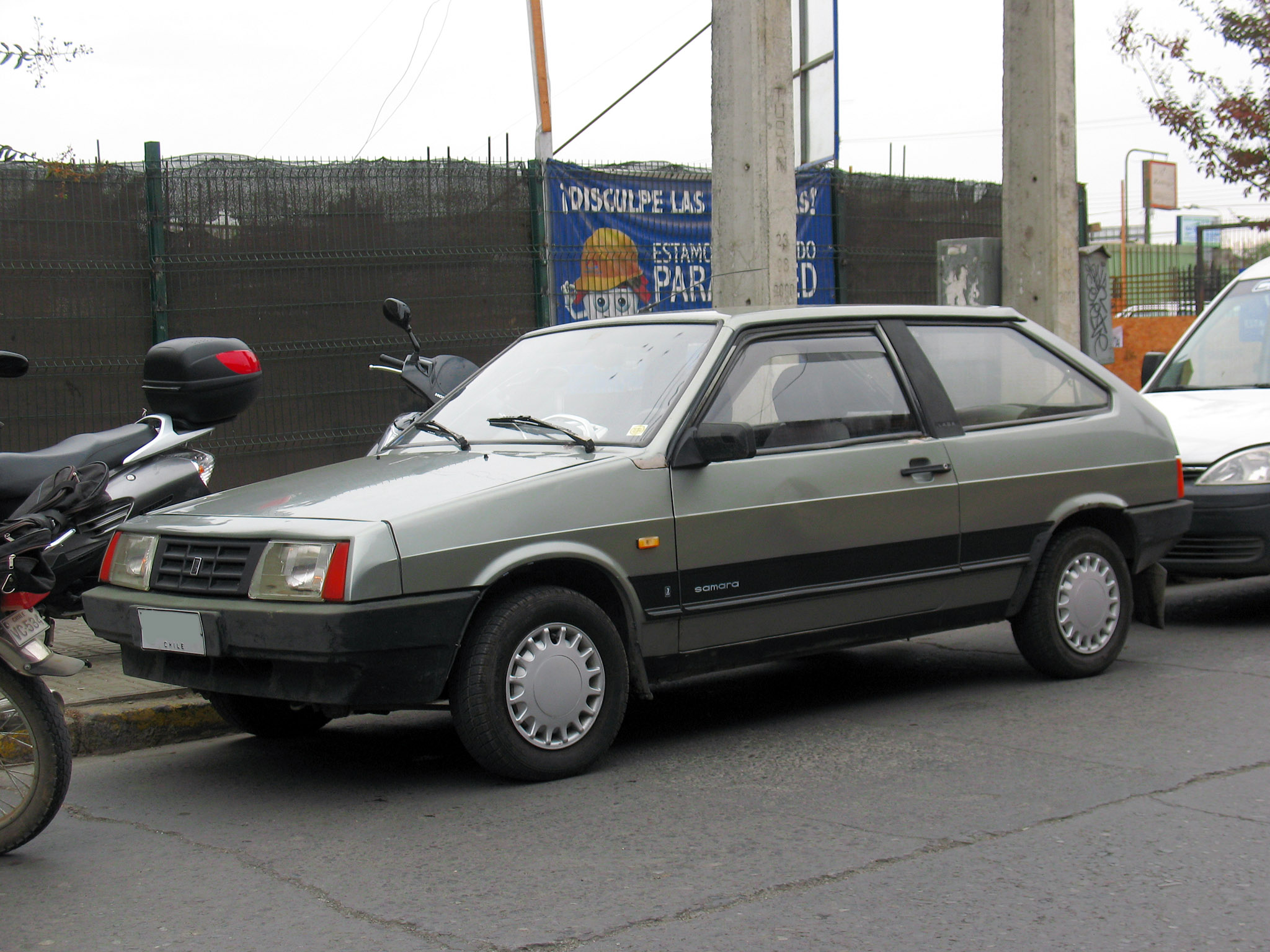
- 1991 Lada Samara 2108 (facelift)

Overview
- Manufacturer: Lada (AvtoVAZ)
- Also called: Lada Carlota (Belgium); Lada Cevaro (Australia); Lada Diva; Lada EuroSamara; Lada Forma (saloon); Lada Natasha (convertible); Lada Sable (Australia); Lada Sagona (saloon); Lada Zarya; Lada Sputnik; Lada Tarzan (Compact SUV); Lada Volante (Australia); VAZ 2108 (1984–2003); VAZ 2109 (1987–2011); VAZ 21099 (1990–2011)
- Production: 1984–2011C
- Assembly: Russia: Togliatti (AvtoVAZ); Russia: Syzran (RosLada); Finland: Uusikaupunki (Valmet Automotive); Kazakhstan: Ust-Kamenogorsk (Azia Avto); Ukraine: Zaporizhia (AvtoZAZ); Uruguay: Montevideo (Bognor)

Body and chassis
- Class: Small family car
- Body style: 2-door convertible; 3/5-door hatchback; 4-door saloon; 2-door panel van; 3/5-door SUV
- Layout: Transverse FF layout
- Related: Lada Shuttle (VAZ-1706)

Powertrain
- Engine: 1.1L VAZ 21081 I4; 1.3L VAZ 2108 I4 (1984–1997); 1.5L VAZ 21083 I4 (1984–2004); 1.5L VAZ 21083-20 I4 (1994–2004); 1.6L VAZ 21084 I4; 1.3L VAZ-415 Wankel twin-rotor
- Transmission: 4-speed manual 5-speed manual

Dimensions
- Wheelbase: 2,460 mm (96.9 in)
- Length: 4,005 mm (157.7 in)
- Width: 1,650 mm (65.0 in)
- Height: 1,335 mm (52.6 in)

Chronology
- Predecessor: VAZ-2105 (VAZ 21099)
- Successor: VAZ-2113 (VAZ 2108); VAZ-2114 (VAZ 2109); VAZ-2115 (VAZ 21099)

The Samara was a car that combined a robust build and ease of maintenance with a modern style. It was produced in various three, four and five-door designs with 1.1, 1.3 and 1.5-litre petrol engines. VAZ had hoped that the Samara would enable it to compete for sales in the mainstream European car market, where the company's traditional Fiat 124-based "Zhiguli" models were looked upon as increasingly outmoded and out of date. It was the second autonomous design from VAZ (the first was the Niva SUV), and the first model not based on the Fiat 124 mechanicals.

=== Development ===
VAZ had made their first front-wheel drive prototype, the VAZ-1101, in the early 1970s. The engine from the Fiat 127 was used. Further development of this project led to the 900 cc (55 cu in) Ladoga three-door hatchback prototype in 1976. The decision to build the Samara was taken on 16 September 1978, the intention being to build a car with strong potential sales in Western European export markets. Proposals for a distinctive saloon, four-door, and both three- and five-door hatchback were considered; it was decided instead the saloon should share the three-door hatchback's sheetmetal forward of the C-pillar. (Design work on the four-door went toward the VAZ-2110 instead.) During its development, VAZ designers paid careful attention to the contemporary Renault 9, Volkswagen Golf, Ford Escort Mark III, Opel Kadett, and Volvo 340, which would be the new VAZ-2108's main competitors. Front suspension was MacPherson struts, rear by torsion bar. It also had rack and pinion steering, another Soviet first.

On 31 December 1979, the first VAZ-2108 prototype was completed. It strongly resembled the earlier Ladoga, and the VAZ-1106 saloon. While named Sputnik at home, it was more commonly known as the Vos'merka ("Eighth") after the last digit in the model code. The export version was named after the Samara River, a tributary to the Volga. The first cars left the production line on 18 December 1984. These, the three-door hatchbacks (the only model available at first), were powered by a belt-driven SOHC 1,288 cc inline-four with 65 hp (48 kW), and were fitted with a four-speed gearbox. The three-door was joined by a five-door, and by models with 1,099 cc (a destroked version of the 1.3) or 1,499 cc (a bored-out 1288) engines. The head was developed in co-operation with Porsche, and the carburetors in connection with Solex. But the Porsche consultants' involvement went beyond just engines. Among other things, the Germans also helped VAZ with passive safety, controllability and easy gear shifting, as well as interior ergonomics.

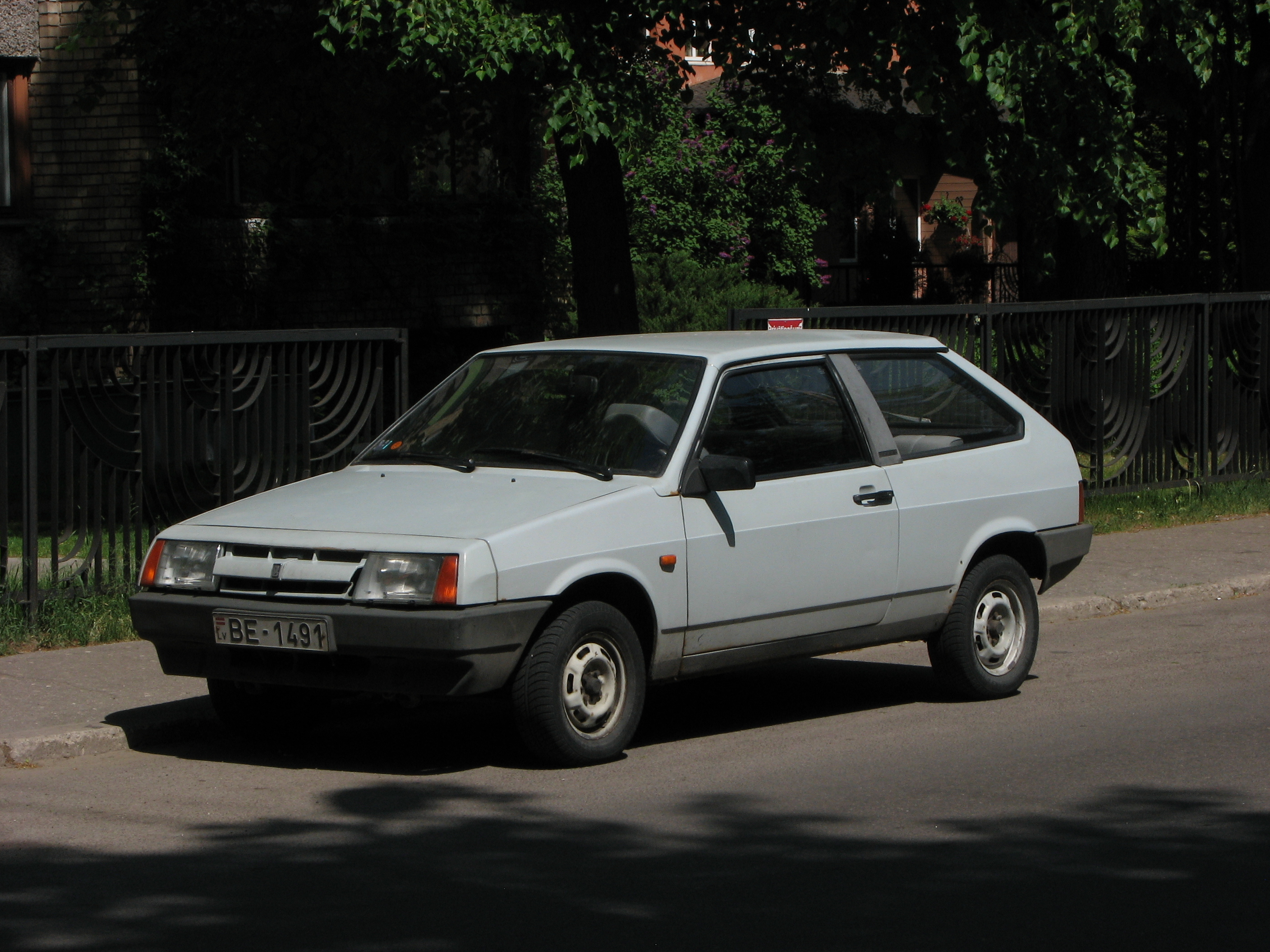
VAZ 2108 Samara (3-door), shorter hood and fender of initial design

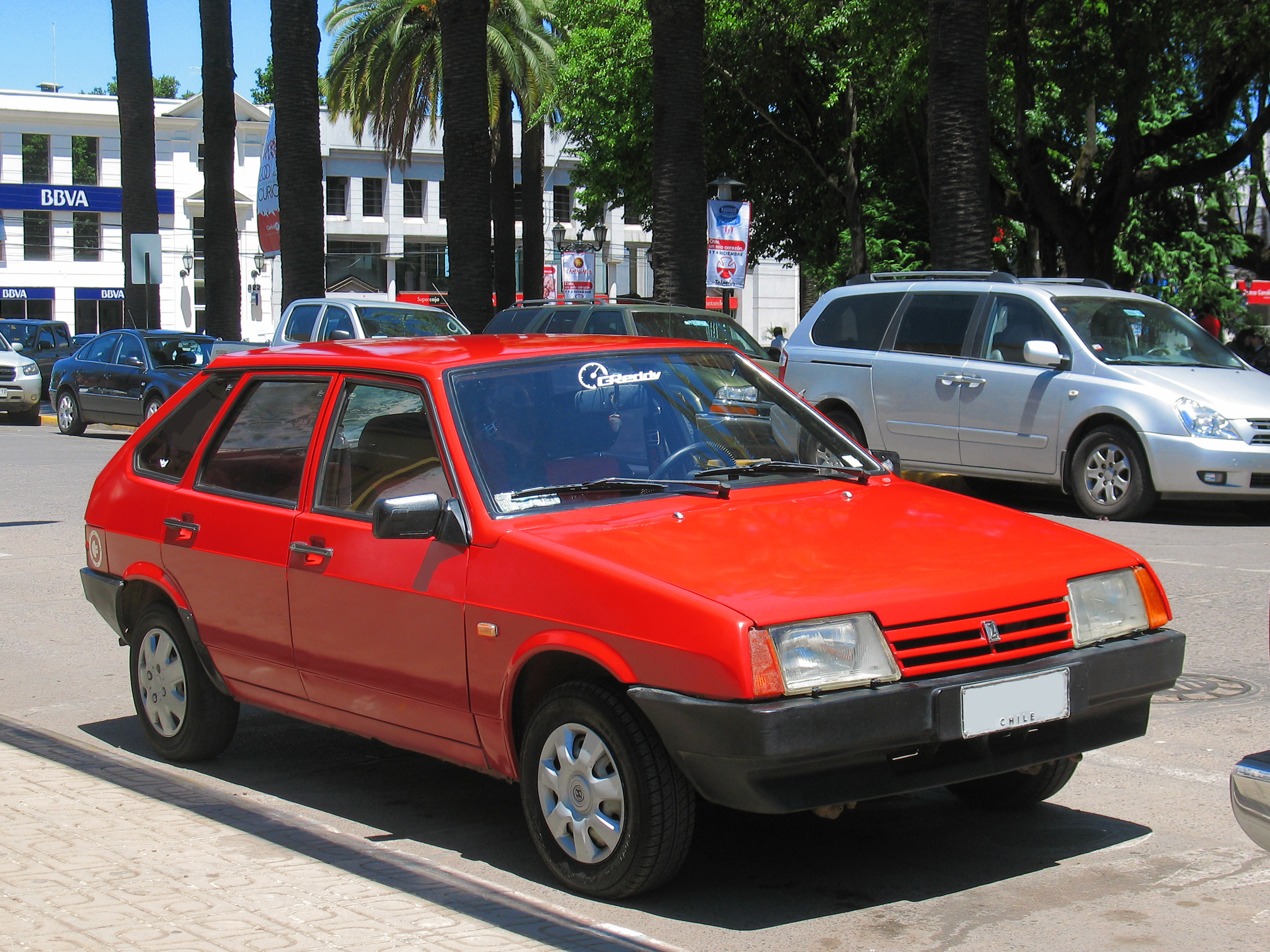
Lada Samara 1500S five-door hatchback, later version with longer hood and revised fenders

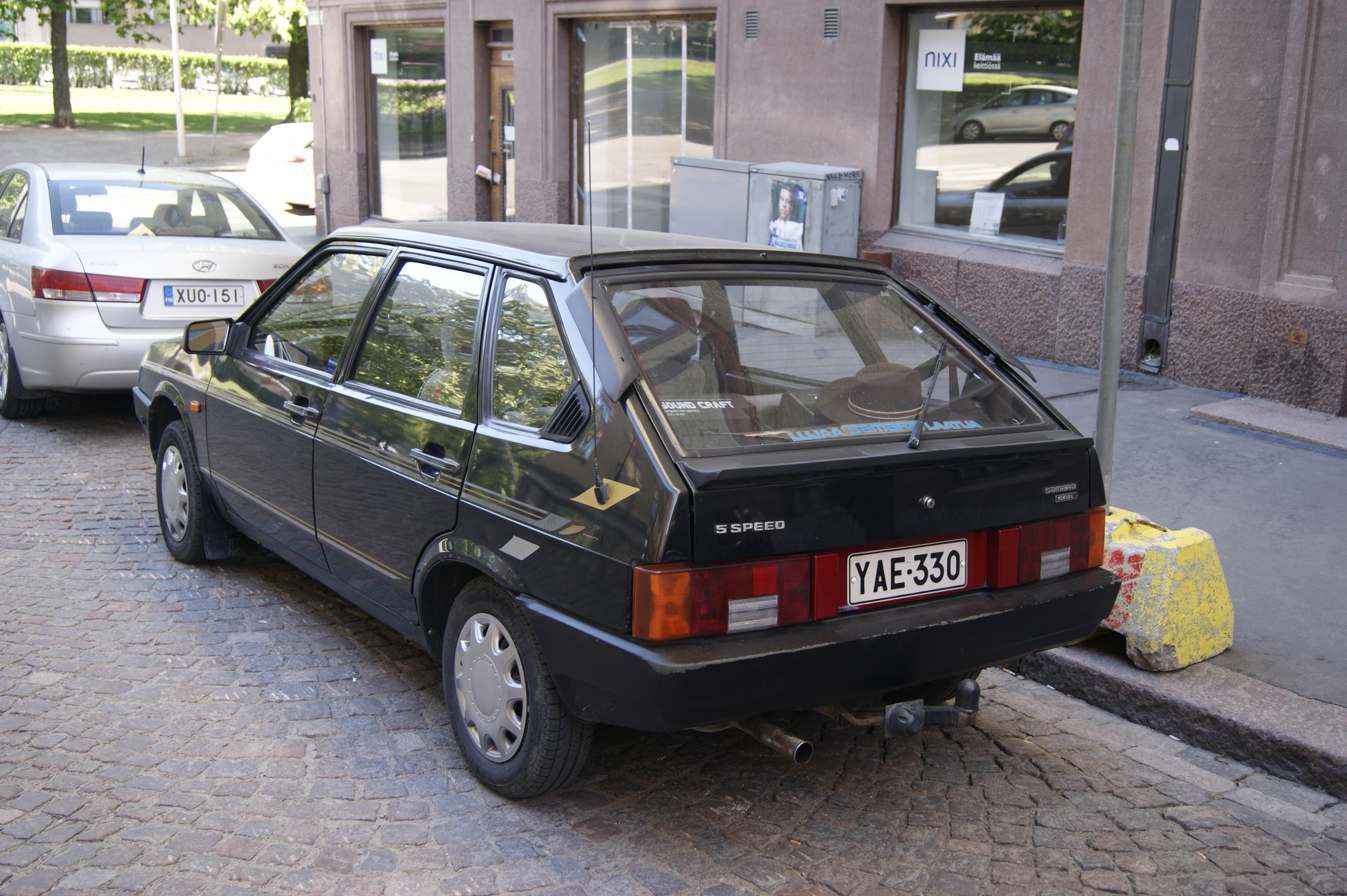
Lada Samara 5-door (rear view)

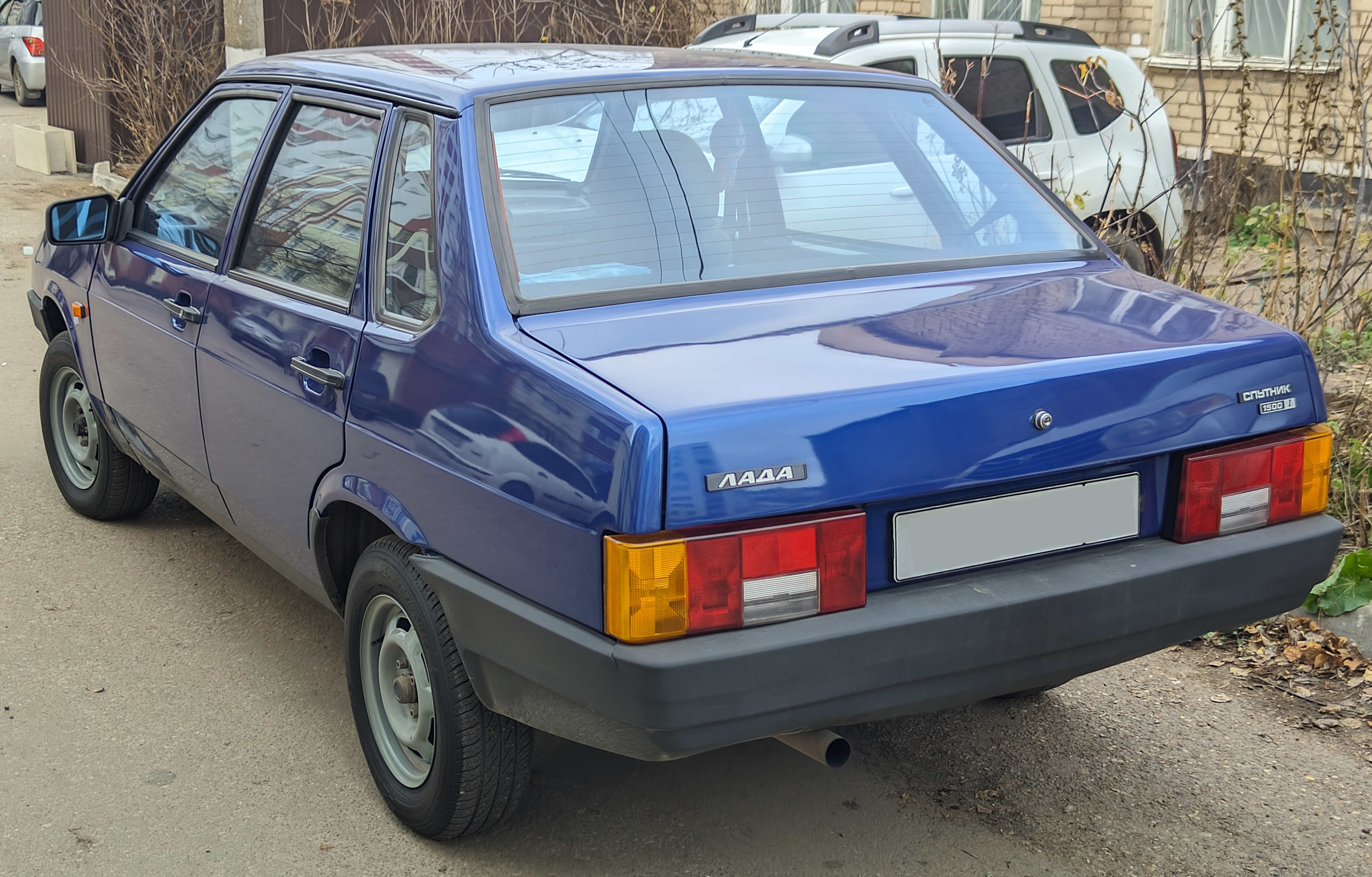
VAZ 21099 (Lada Sagona) four-door saloon (rear view)

In 1987, the model range was joined by the 21083, with a 72 hp (53 kW) 1,499 cc engine and five-speed gearbox, and the 21081, with a 53 hp (39 kW), 1,099 cc engine. The 1.1 was an export-only variant. Top speeds were 87 mph (140 km/h) (1.1), 92 mph (148 km/h) (1.3) and 97 mph (156 km/h) (1.5); fuel economy was 7.9 L/100 km (36 mpg_{‑imp}; 30 mpg_{‑US}) (1099), 9.3 L/100 km (30 mpg_{‑imp}; 25 mpg_{‑US}) (1288), or 9.5 L/100 km (30 mpg_{‑imp}; 25 mpg_{‑US}) (1499). VAZ also debuted the 2109 five-door hatchback that year, also available with the 1.1, 1.3, and 1.5-litre engines. In 1989, the 21099 saloon followed, which had a new bonnet, grille, wings, and 200 mm (7.9 in)-longer rear overhang, as well as an improved dashboard. The 21099's front-end styling was adopted on the 2109 in 1992 and the 2108 in 1994.

A number of other minor alterations followed, including fuel-injected engines to meet emissions regulations in export markets. On the earlier Samaras the front clip had been a separate piece, surrounding the headlights. On the sedan version, the fenders go all the way up to the headlights and the lip of the bonnet dips between the headlights and meets the slimmer grille. Full production of the 21099 began in December 1990, with models 210993 (1288), 21099 (1499). The saloon, intended as a premium model compared to the hatchback, was given a distinctive branding in some export markets: Diva (Belgium), Sagona (France), Forma (Germany). Belgium also offered a locally built convertible. The 1.1 and 1.3 were eventually taken out of production, having already been withdrawn from export markets, while the 1.5's power increased to 75 hp (55 kW).

=== Special models ===
A Wankel engined Samara three-door hatchback, the 2108–91, powered by a two-rotor VAZ-415 (with two 654 cc rotors) was sold in Russia only, and only in very small numbers. With a five-speed gearbox, it was priced at 56,000 rubles. Due to severe reliability problems, this remained rare, most commonly bought by police and other agencies to use as a pursuit vehicle, for which its 200 km/h (124 mph) top speed was ideal; it was capable of 0 to 100 km/h (0 to 62 mph) in eight seconds. The subsequent 2109-91 five-door hatchback had the same VAZ-415 and gearbox.

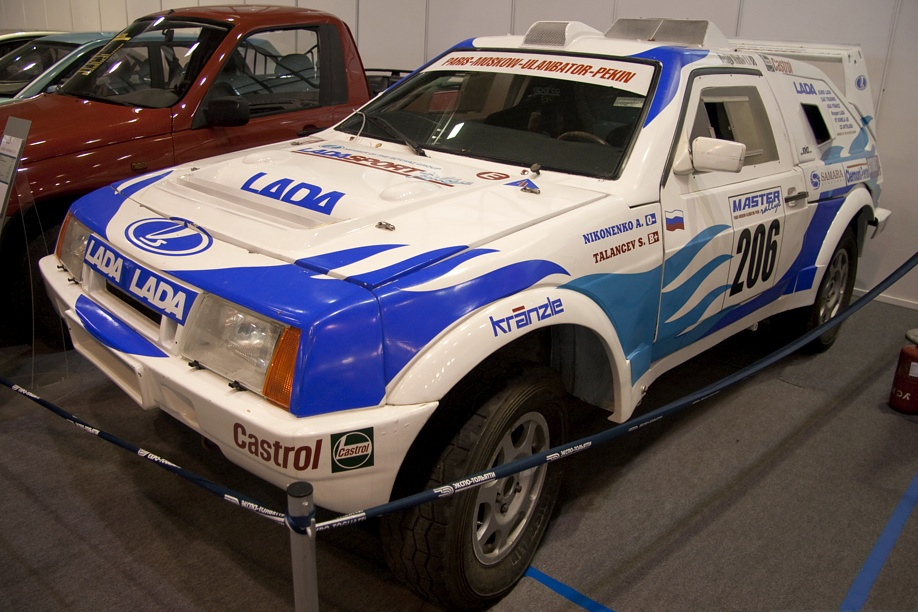
Lada Samara T3

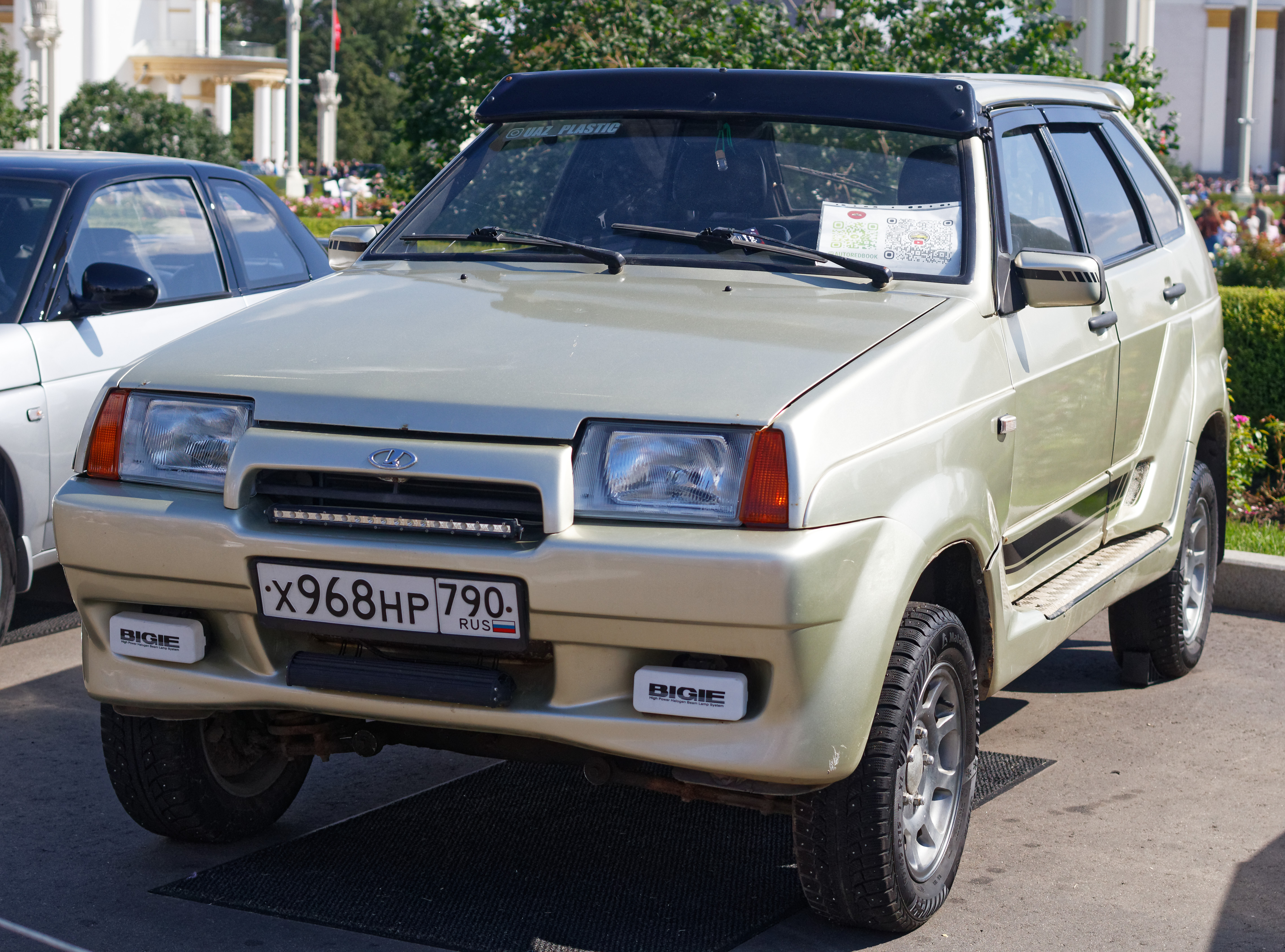
Lada Tarzan (VAZ 210934)

There was also a rear-engined Samara 4x4 rally car, also known as the NAMI 0290, built for the 1985 Soyuz Rally; it had permanent four-wheel drive and a 150 hp (110 kW) 1,568 cc Zhiguli-based engine, over the rear axle. It was nicknamed Appelsin ("orange", for its paint), and used ZAZ-1102 doors (though the body was mostly fiberglass, weighing only 960 kg (2,116 lb)) and still using factory Samara wheels.

The 1987 mid-engined Samara-EVA had a turbocharged 16-valve 1,860 cc engine (with electronic fuel injection) of 300 hp (221 kW); a naturally-aspirated version produced 160 hp (118 kW). The only component left untouched was the original Zhuguli 2106 block.

An even more powerful Samara S-Proto appeared in 1989, putting out 350 hp (257 kW). Most notably, the Samara T3 came seventh in class in the 1990 Paris-Dakar Rally and fifth in 1991, piloted by Jacky Ickx. The T3 did not contain many Samara parts however, using the Porsche 959's four-wheel drive system and a 3.6-litre Porsche flat-six. It was developed by French concessionaire Lada-Poch together with NAMI and the Tupolev aircraft factory. In the mid-1980s Lada developed its first ever convertible car on its own, then actually entering production and quickly exported to most European countries, called the Lada Natasha Cabriolet, a four-seater convertible that was based on the popular Samara 1300/1500 models with a manual opening and closing canvas roof. Also in some European car markets the LADA Niva 4X4 1600 cc engine was also available for both the Lada Natasha and Lada Samara cars during the 1990s.

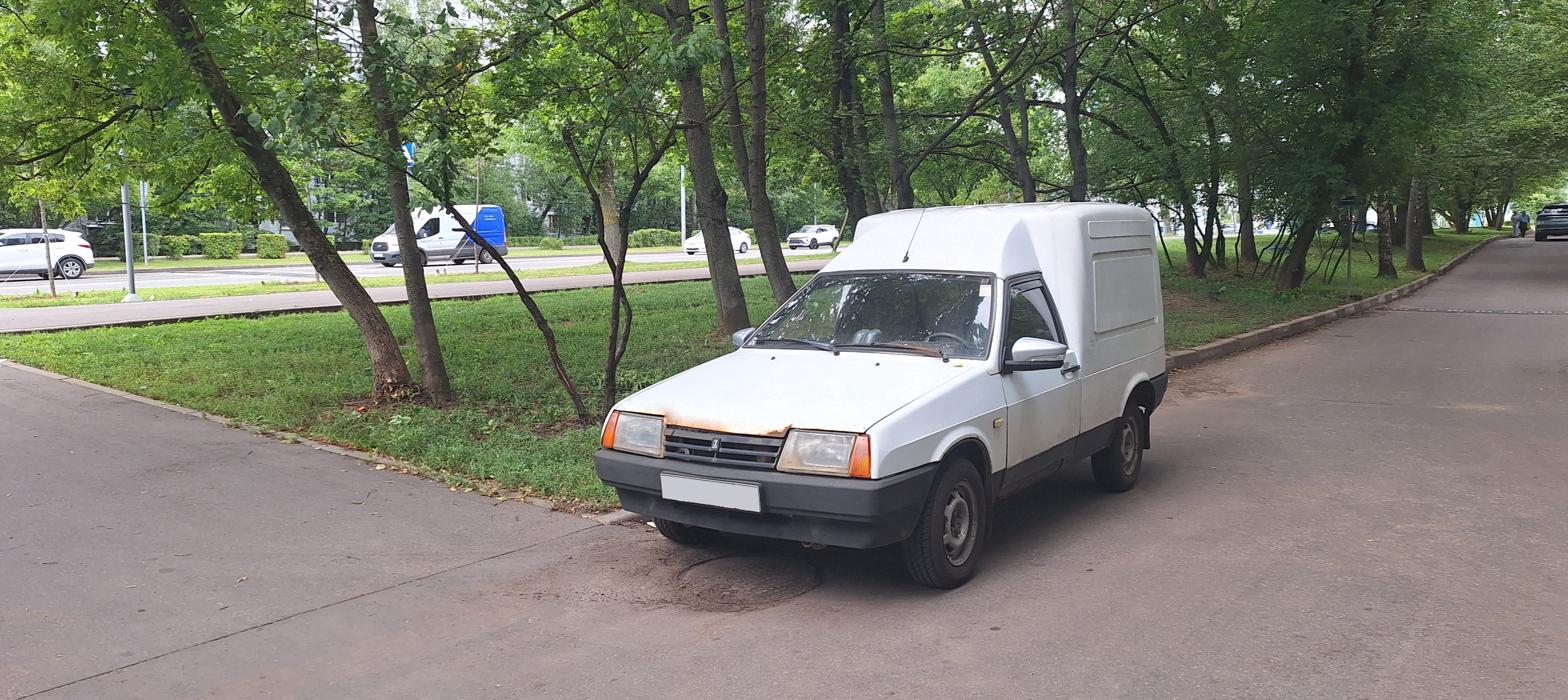
VIS-1705

The AvtoVAZ division VIS-AVTO produced special commercial vans and refrigerated trucks for various purposes on the VAZ 2108 platform.

== Exports ==
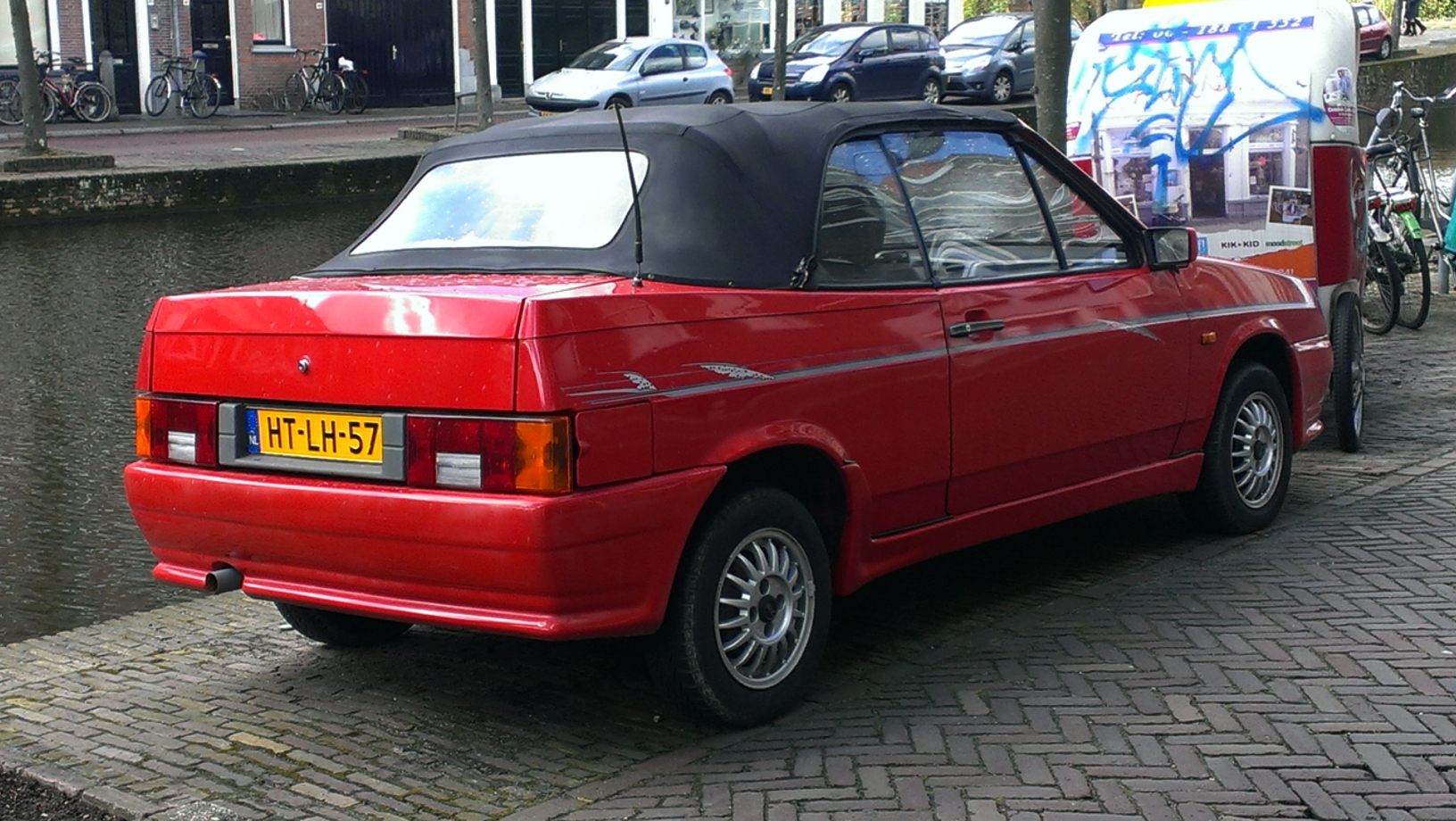
1992 Lada Samara Cabriolet, also called "Natasha"

The Samara was sold all across the world, from Australia to Canada, in most European countries, and throughout the COMECON sphere. The build quality of the Samara was better than that of most Eastern European models. In most nations, versions and equipments were decided on and installed by the dealers themselves. These local varieties ranged from decals and badges to the convertible conversions offered in Belgium and Germany. The Samara was often sold under other names as well, in particular the VAZ 21099 (Samara Sedan), which was sold as the Sagona (France, Canada, and Spain), Diva (Belgium and the Netherlands), Forma (Germany) and Sable (Australia and New Zealand).

It was engineered in right-hand drive for the UK market, where it was sold from November 1987. It was sold there until VAZ withdrew from the UK market in July 1997, and was the most popular Lada model sold in the UK during the 23 years that the brand was sold there.

In certain markets where the tax structure benefited diesels (such as France and the Benelux), the Samara was available with a 1.5-litre Peugeot diesel engine in 1995–97.

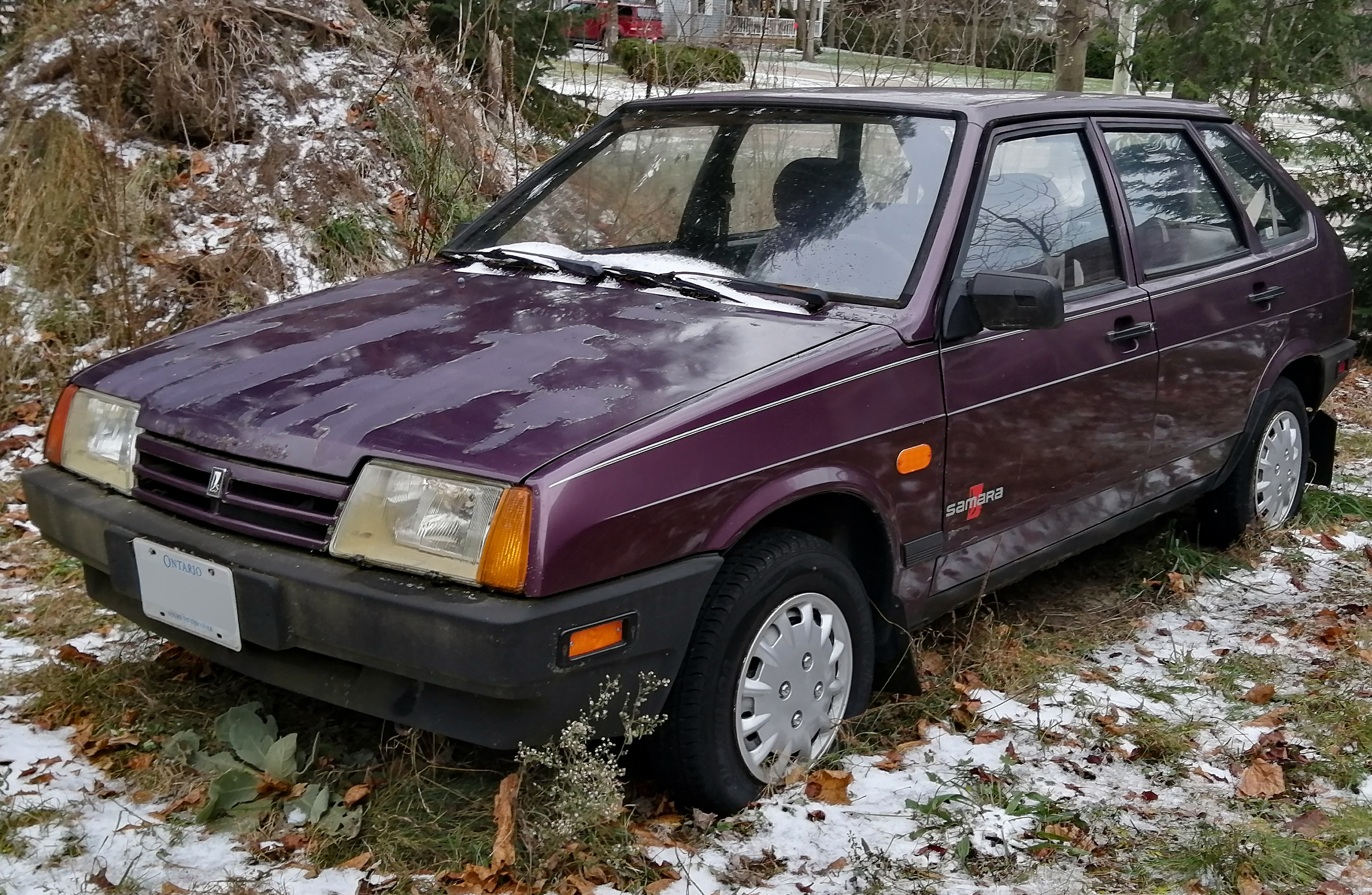
Canadian-spec 1996 Lada Samara

With VAZ facing financial hardships in 1996–1997, exports began coming to a halt. The Lada Samara disappeared from Canada after the 1997 model year, leaving the Niva as the only Lada sold in Canada for the 1998 model year. Exports to Australia and Great Britain ended around the same time. The biggest problem was GM's reluctance to sell the fuel-injection kits necessary for exports, as they doubted VAZ's ability to pay. Faced with parts shortages, tax problems, and the chaos and criminality of Russia in the mid-nineties, export efforts languished and RHD production was no longer feasible.

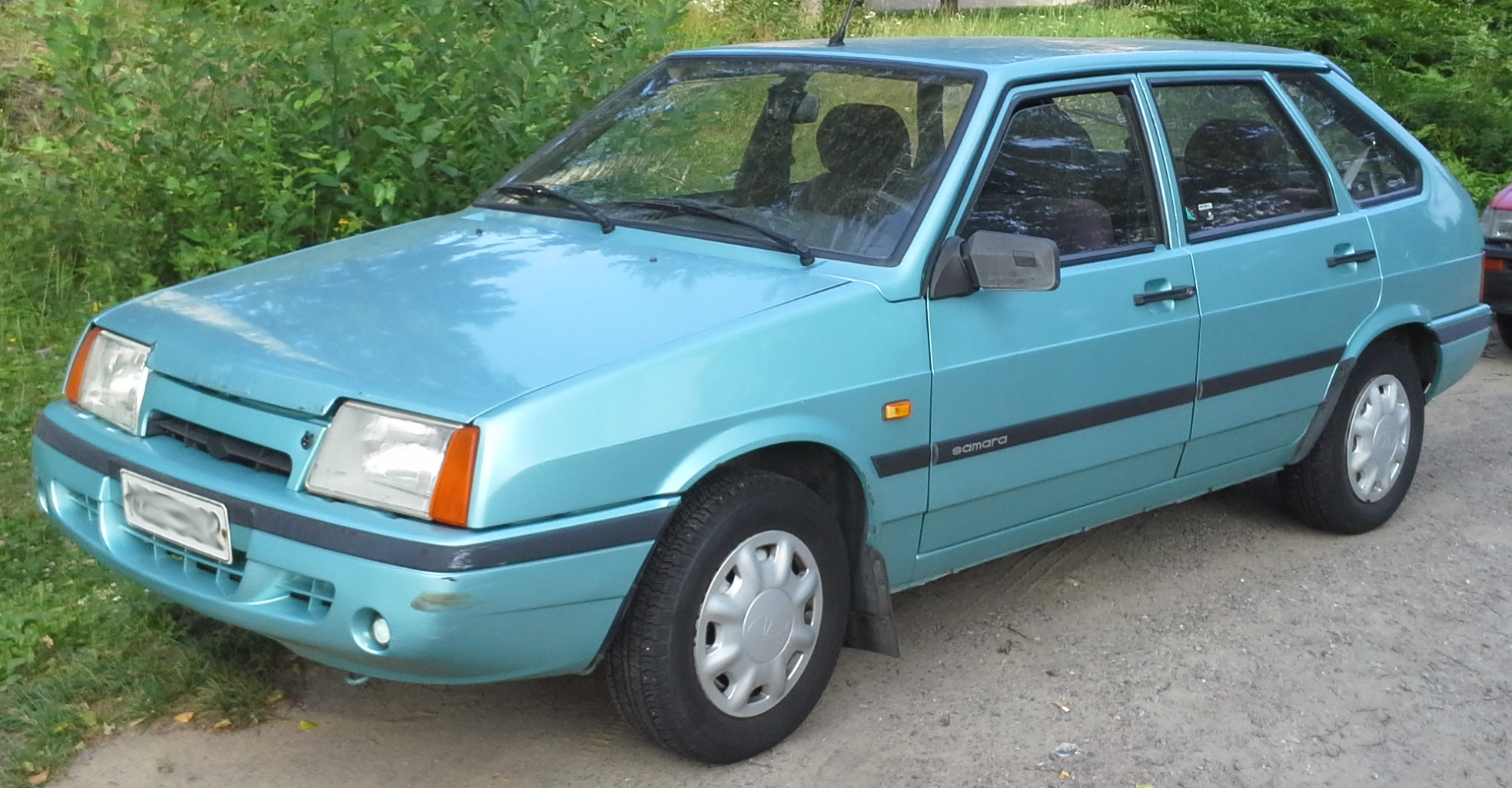
Finnish assembled Lada Samara Baltic

As a partial response to this situation, a higher-quality version for the European market, the Lada EuroSamara or Samara Baltic in some markets, was assembled in Finland at the Valmet Automotive plant in Uusikaupunki. Production started in mid-1996 and ended in July 1998, with 14,000 cars made from 85 per cent Russian parts.

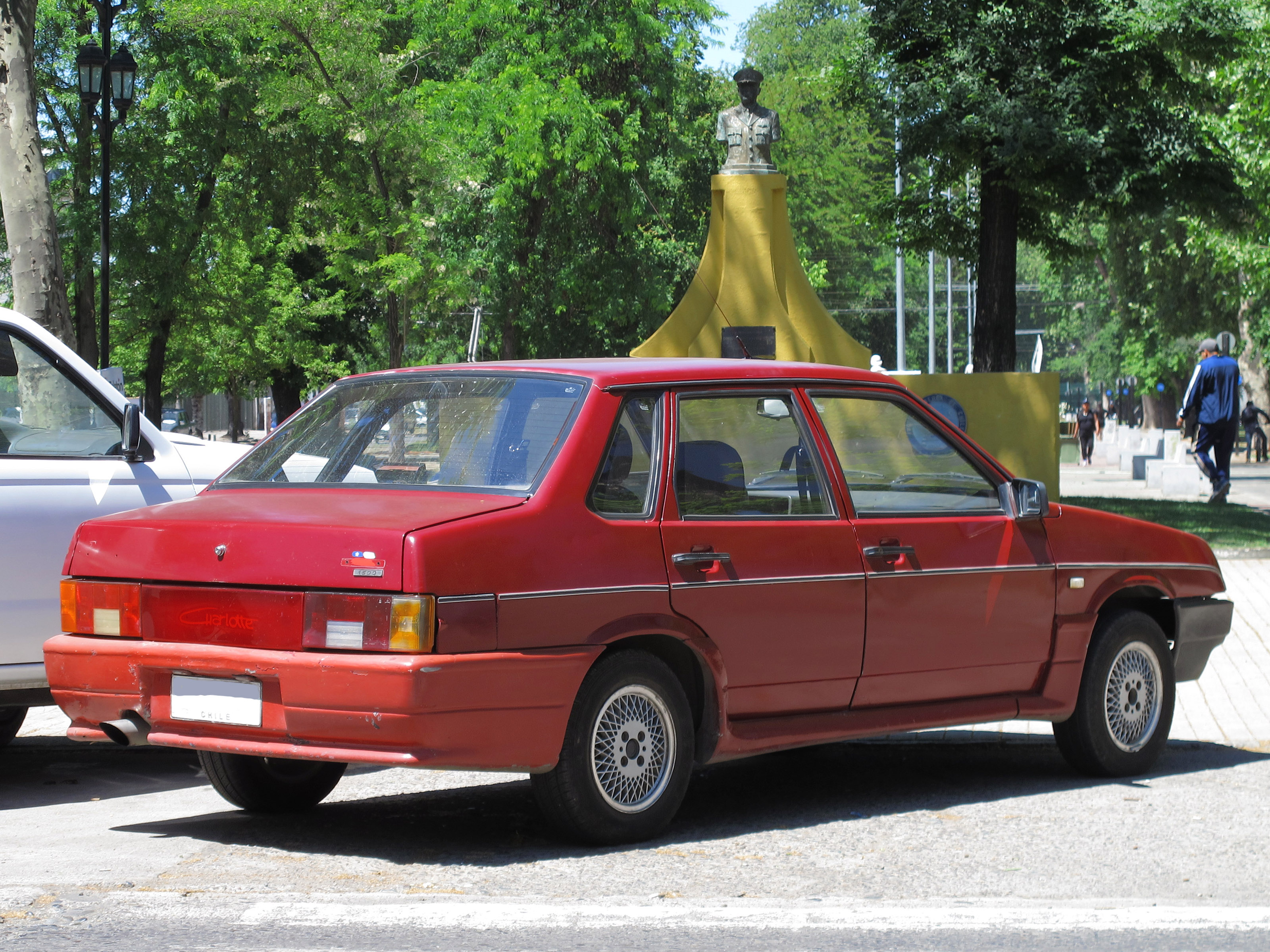
1994 Lada Samara 21099 1500 Charlotte (Chile)

Lada Samara was also sold in Singapore in the 1990s. However, Lada withdrew from the Singapore market shortly after due to the COE system that made car ownership very expensive. Lada cars were proven impractical for Singapore. Furthermore, it was often criticised for low quality.

=== British market ===
The United Kingdom had to wait nearly three years for the Samara to go on sale, after its launch in the USSR, but sales were reasonably strong when the first versions of the car left forecourts, in November 1987.

In a road test conducted by The Motor magazine, it scored more than 5 points out of 10 in most aspects and was praised for having a remarkably extensive list of standard equipment, "impressive" engine, good visibility and performance for its price segment, lowered fuel consumption, being good at cornering and "tolerably quiet", but also received criticism for having a cheap-looking interior and plastic mouldings and being "very turbulent" on poor roads.

The £4,795 price at introduction "was much less expensive" than the competing Peugeot 309 or Ford Escort 1300. The Samara remained on sale in the United Kingdom right up to 4 July 1997, when the decision was made to withdraw from Great Britain and most other export markets. In countries where ruggedness was more important, it was more successful, selling reasonably well in Canada, Australia, and Finland for instance.

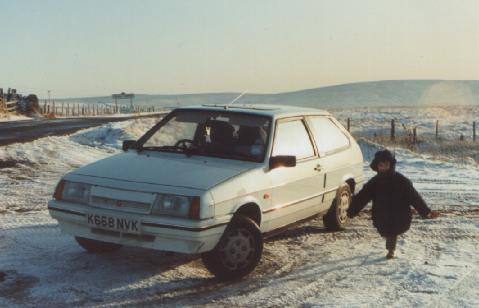
Samara 1500 hatchback (UK, Dec '92)

The attempt to appeal to a wider clientele failed; while an improvement over previous Ladas, the Samara's higher price pitched it against stiffer West European competition.

By the time of the Samara's launch, the British small family car market was effectively split into two segments: The large mainstream market was dominated by mass-market manufacturers, such as Ford, Vauxhall, and Volkswagen. The budget market consisted of Eastern European and Far Eastern brands, such as Škoda, FSO, Hyundai, and Proton.

The aging Samara came bottom of the annual 1996 and 1997 JD Power and Top Gear surveys in Great Britain.

==== Versions ====
Initially sold as a three- or five-door hatchback with a 1.3 petrol engine, a 1.5 version became available in October 1988. Metallic paint became an option for the first time in November 1989 when the 1.5 SLX was launched. A new entry-level model arrived in July 1990 when the 1.1 petrol engine was added to the range (Select or L). An updated version of the Samara was launched in April 1991, with all new trim levels. This was followed by the introduction of the VAZ 21099 saloon version 15 months later. The saloon also became available as a sporty 1.5 "Juno" from July 1994, featuring alloy wheels, swoopy, ill-fitting sideskirts and a rear spoiler. A fuel injected engine became available on the 1.3 and 1.5 models in August 1996.

=== Australian market ===
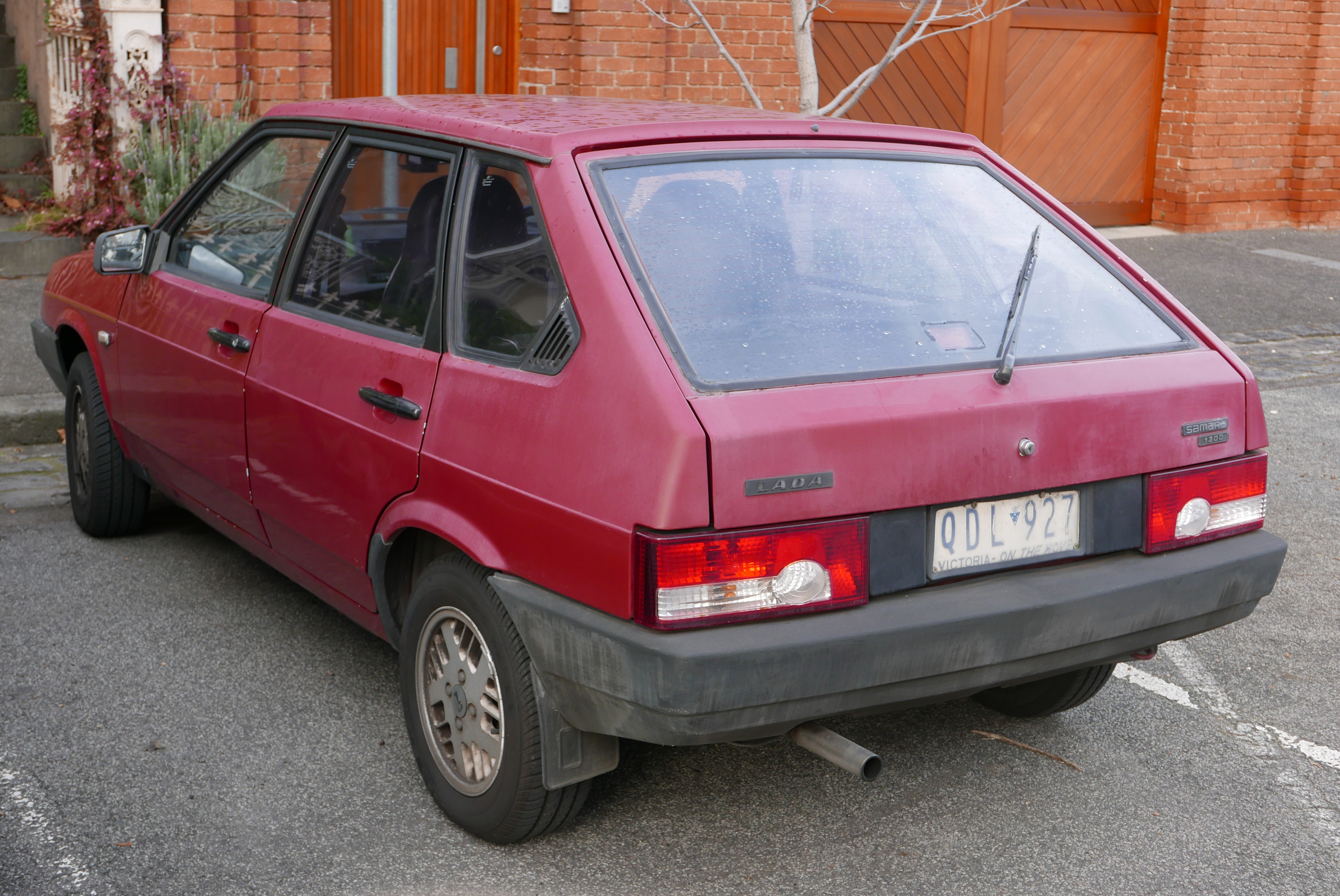
1991 Lada Samara 1300 5-door hatchback (Australia)

The Samara was introduced into the Australian market in July 1988, and was offered in three-door and convertible body styles. A three-door variant called the Bizivan was also offered, which was sold without rear seats in order to qualify as a commercial van, and therefore, lower import duties. In 1990, the range was pared down to a single five-door model, marketed as the Lada Cevaro. The 3-door returned in 1994 as the Lada Volante and the four-door was introduced as the Lada Sable. Imports had ceased by 1996.

In 1988, approximately 6,000 Lada Samaras were modified by Peter Brock's Special Vehicles operation that had previously made high performance Holden Commodores. The cars would be known as the Lada Samara Sedan Brock Delux and included a few subtle Brock-devised suspension tweaks to improve the car's low-speed ride, as well as a special body kit. It cost about A$3,000 more than the base model Samara.

== Samara 2 (1997) ==
Lada Samara 2
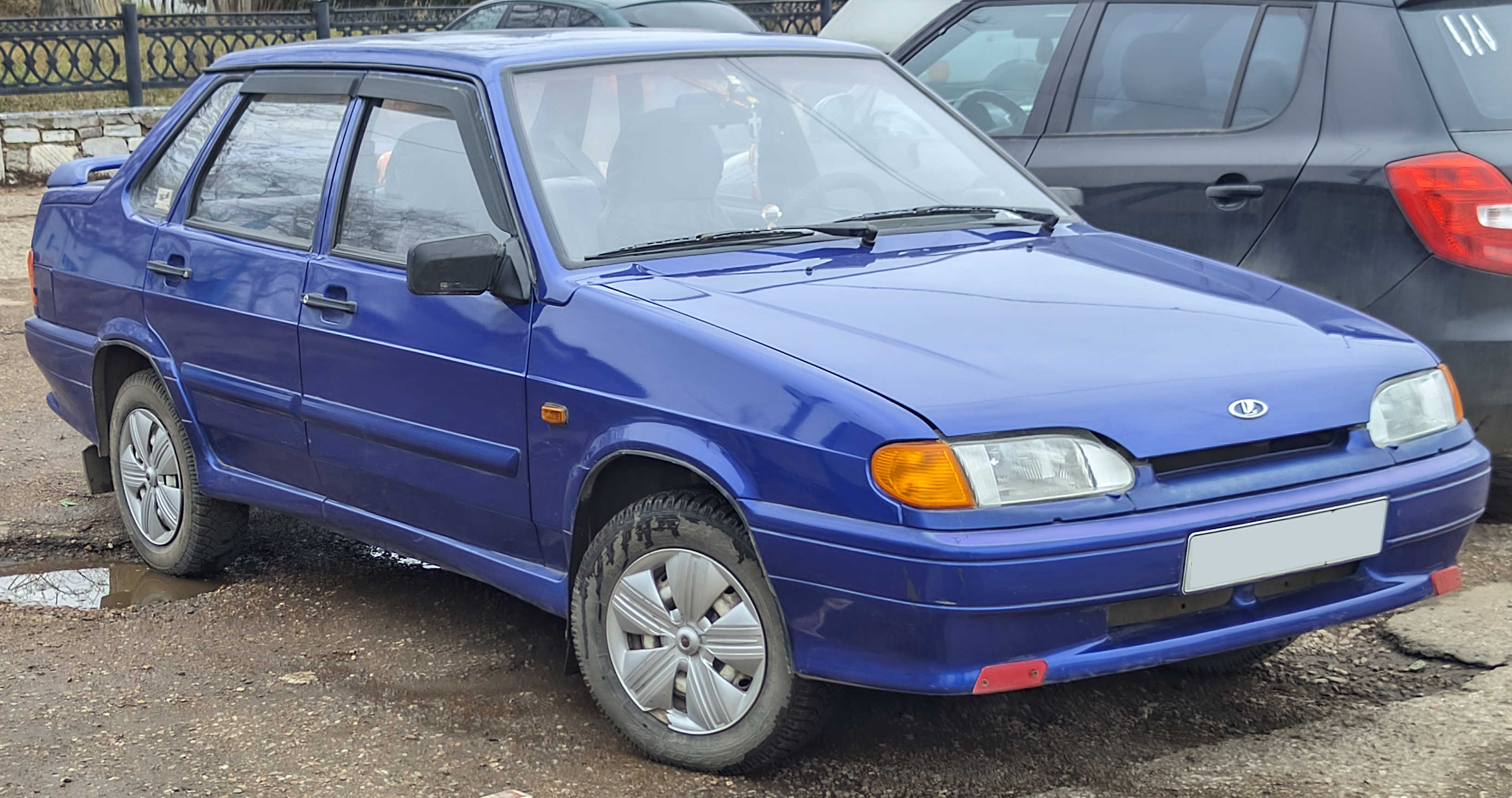
- VAZ 2115

Overview
- Manufacturer: AvtoVAZ
- Also called: Lada Samara 2 VAZ 2113 (3-door); VAZ 2114 (5-door); VAZ 2115 (sedan)
- Production: 1997–2013; VAZ 2113 (2004–2013); VAZ 2114 (2001–2013); VAZ 2115 (1997–2012)
- Assembly: Russia: Togliatti (AvtoVAZ & Super-Avto); Kazakhstan: Ust-Kamenogorsk (Azia Avto)

Body and chassis
- Class: Small family car
- Body style: 4-door saloon 3/5-door hatchback
- Layout: FF layout
- Related: VIS-234700

Dimensions
- Wheelbase: 1,370 mm (53.9 in)–4,330 mm (170.5 in)
- Length: 4,122 mm (162.3 in)–4,330 mm (170.5 in)
- Width: 1,650 mm (65.0 in)
- Height: 1,340 mm (52.8 in)

Chronology
- Successor: Lada Priora

After 1997, the Samara was mostly sold in its homeland only, although it was still sold in some foreign markets with less strict emissions regulations. The Samara 2, a lightly facelifted version with a 77 hp (57 kW), single-point fuel-injected version of the 1,499 cc engine and a better gearbox, went on sale in limited numbers as the 2115 (four-door sedan) in 1997. The 2115 was built at the VAZ special vehicles unit. Brakes and interior were also upgraded, incorporating parts from the VAZ 2110. Full production on the main line in Togliatti began in 2000, in 2002 a five-door (2114) was added and the 2113 three-door followed in September 2004. The three-door was not originally planned to be built, but was added as a response to strong dealer demand.

In late 2001, the 1500 engine was updated with multi-point fuel injection, enabling it to meet Euro 3 emissions regulations. The last first generation Samara rolled off the Togliatti production line in 2004, ending 20 years of production there. Production of the "classic" Samara 2109/21099 continued at ZAZ in Ukraine as of 2004, and from May 2007 in Kazakhstan by Azia Avto.

In January 2007, an upgraded Samara 2, using the modern 1.6-litre VAZ-11183-20 engine first seen in the VAZ 2110 went on sale. While the Lada 110 and the Lada Priora have taken much of the Samara's market share at home, the Samara retains a clear price advantage and steady demand. The production of sedan Lada Samara 2 was stopped in December 2012; hatchbacks were still assembled until the end of 2013.

As with the VAZ 2108, the AvtoVAZ division VIS-AVTO produced special commercial vans and refrigerated trucks for various purposes.

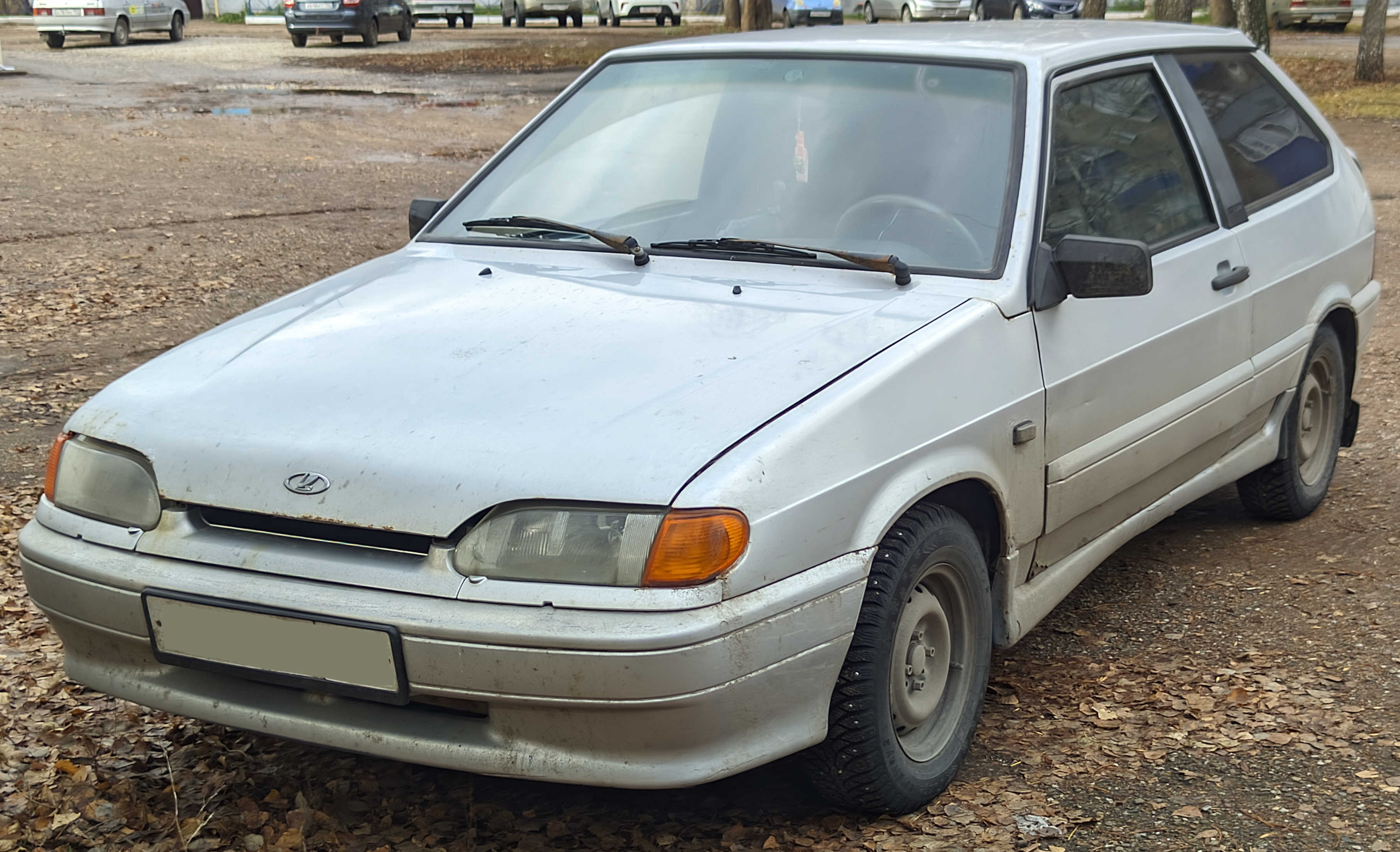
VAZ 2113 (3-door)

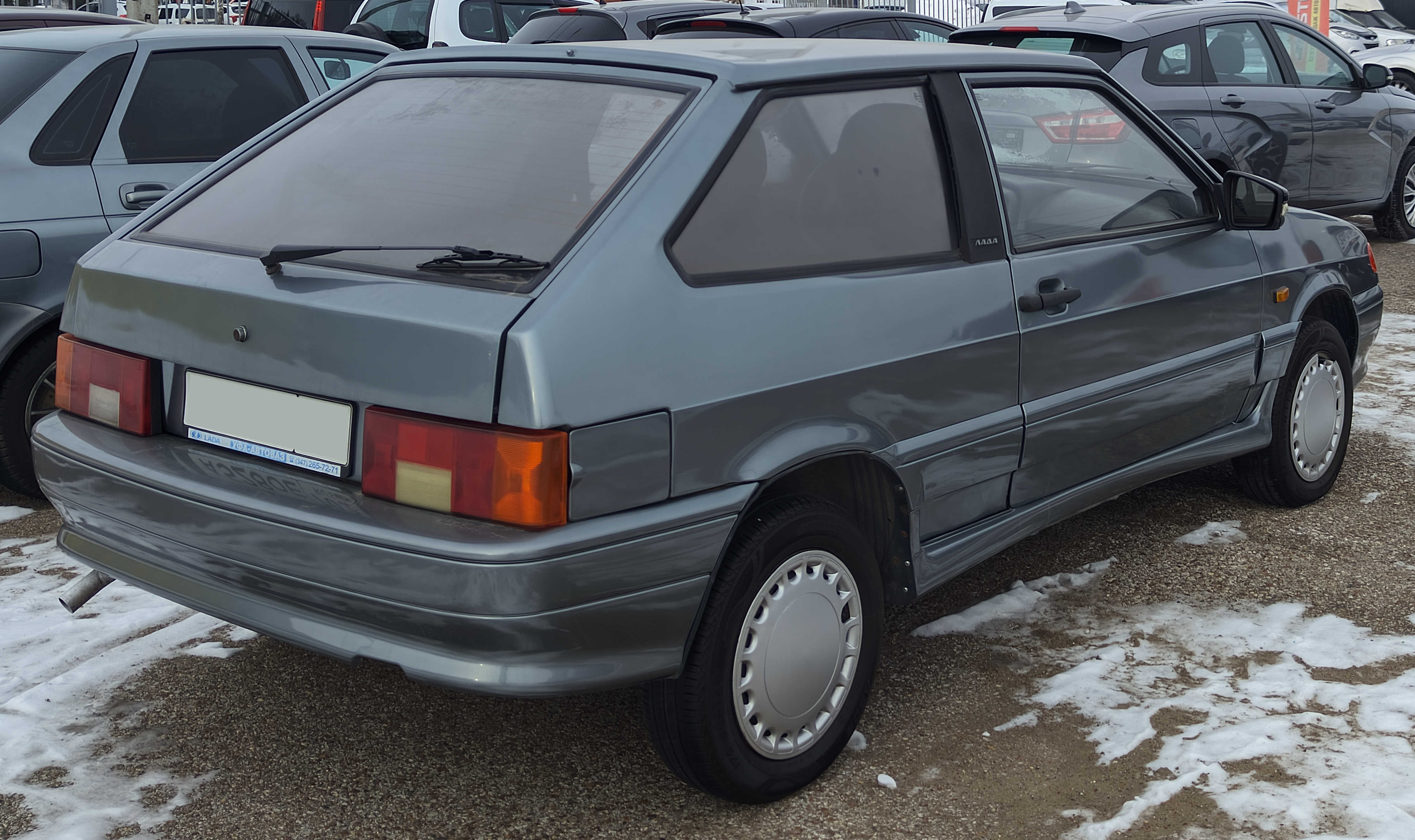
VAZ 2113 (rear view)

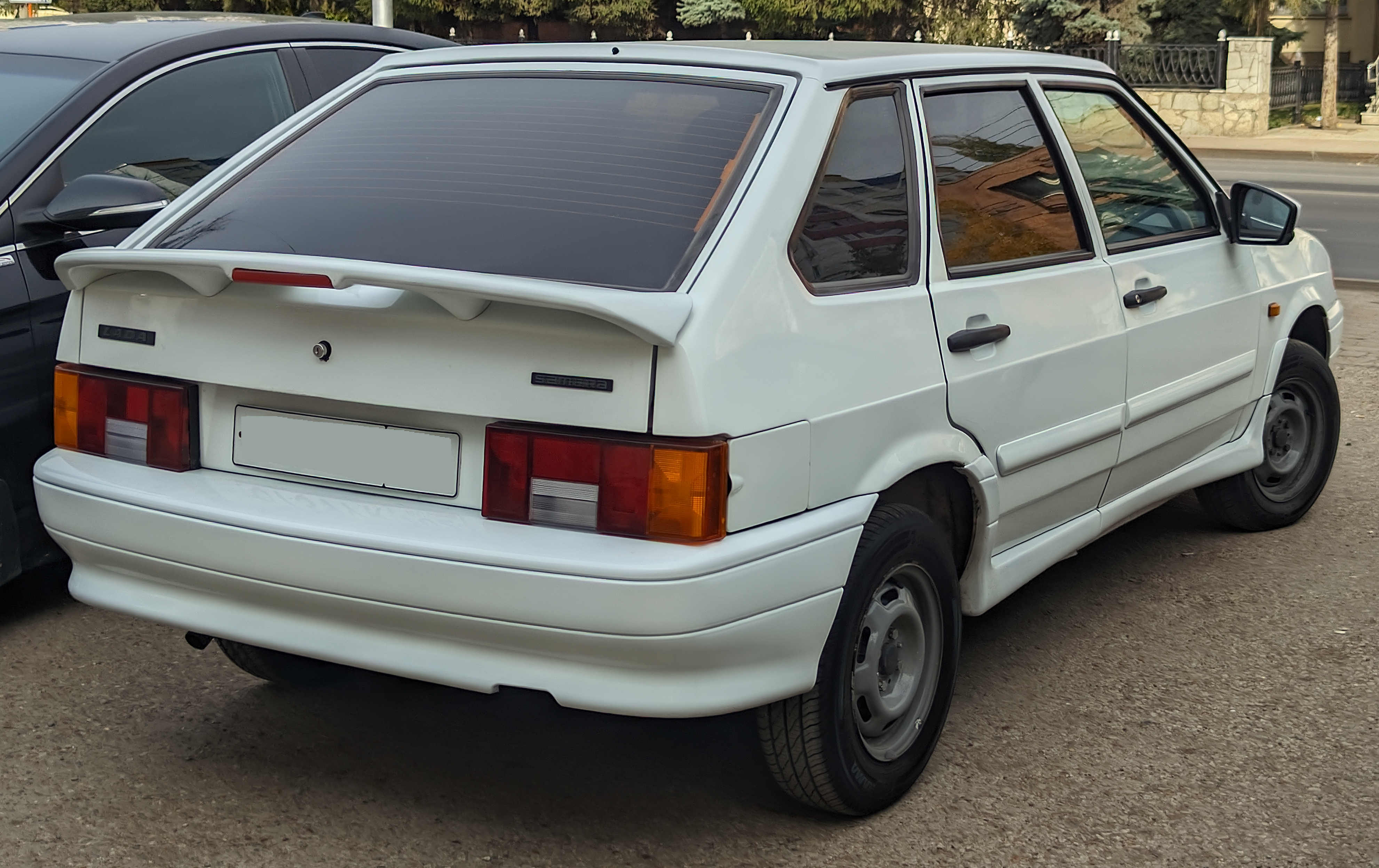
VAZ 2114 (5-door)

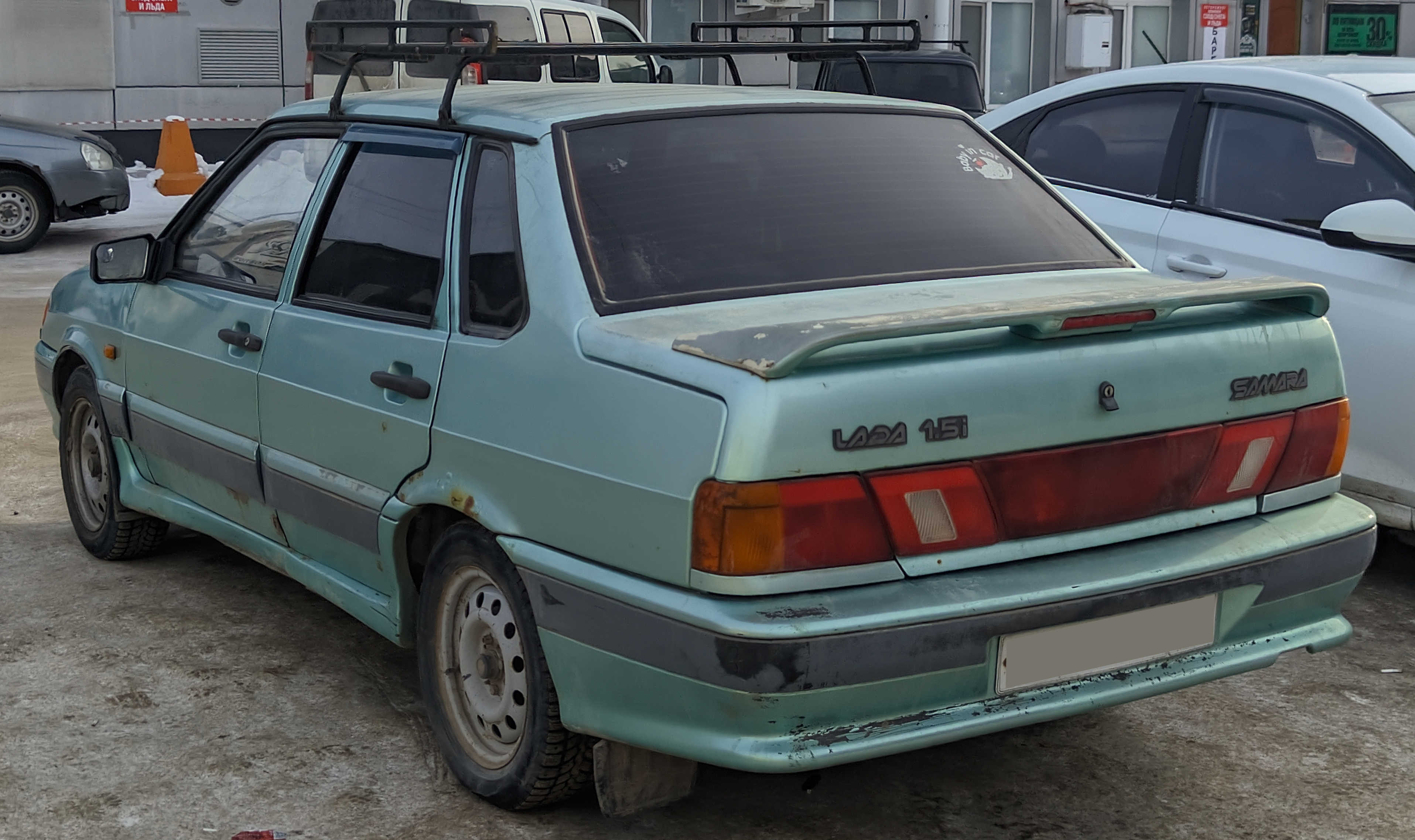
VAZ 2115 sedan (5-door)

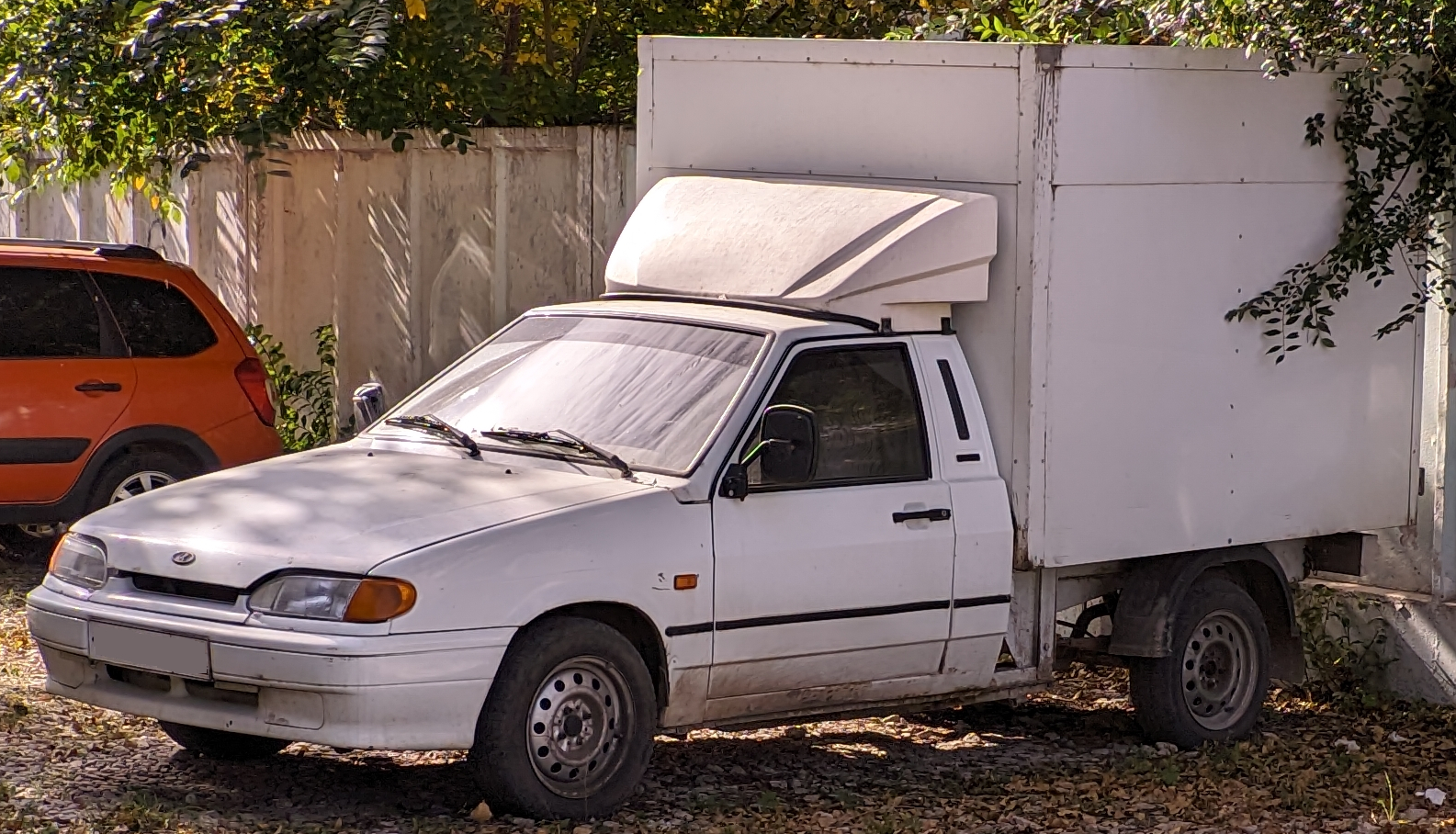
VIS-234700

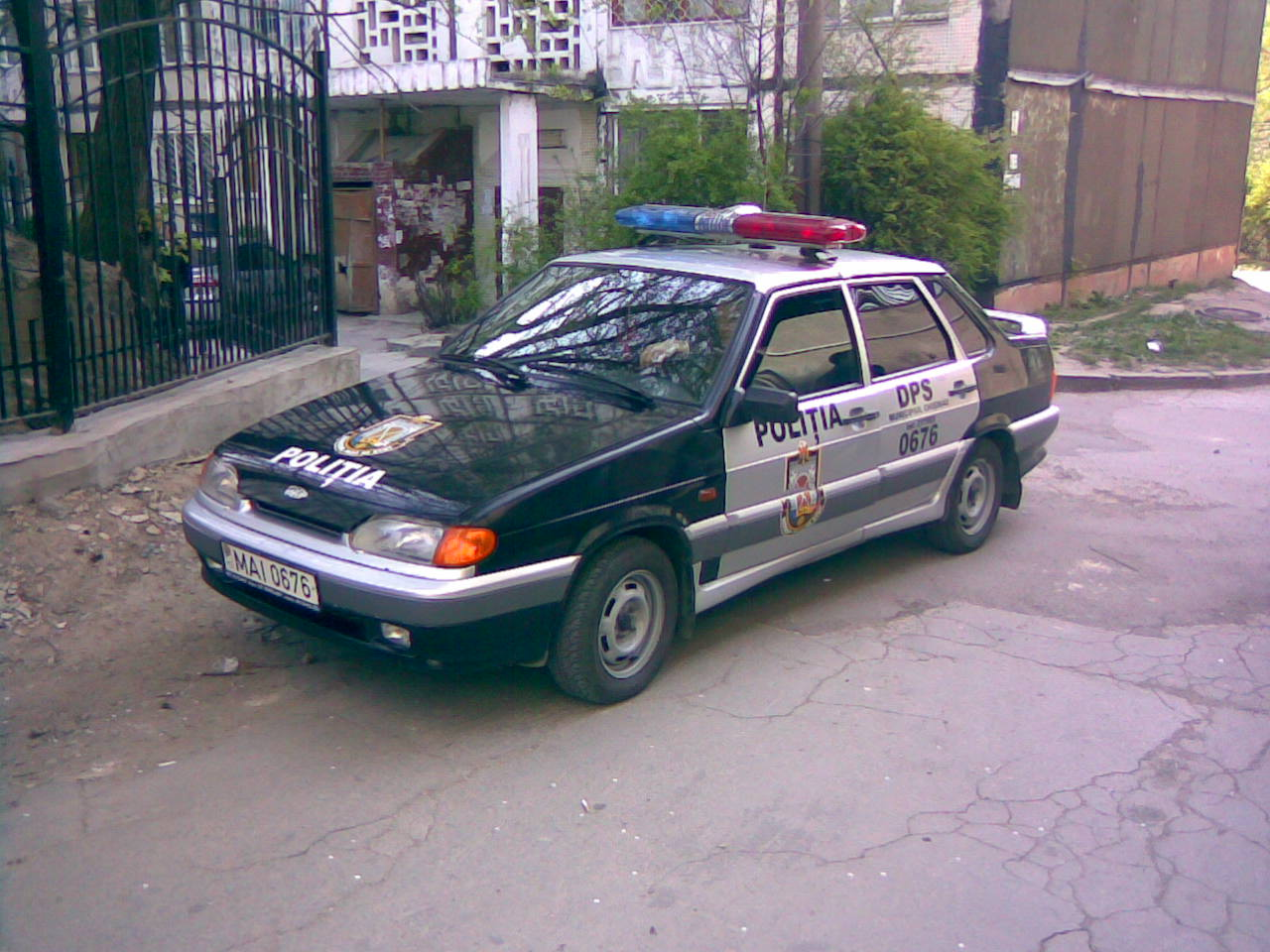
Lada 2115 police car in Chișinău, Moldova

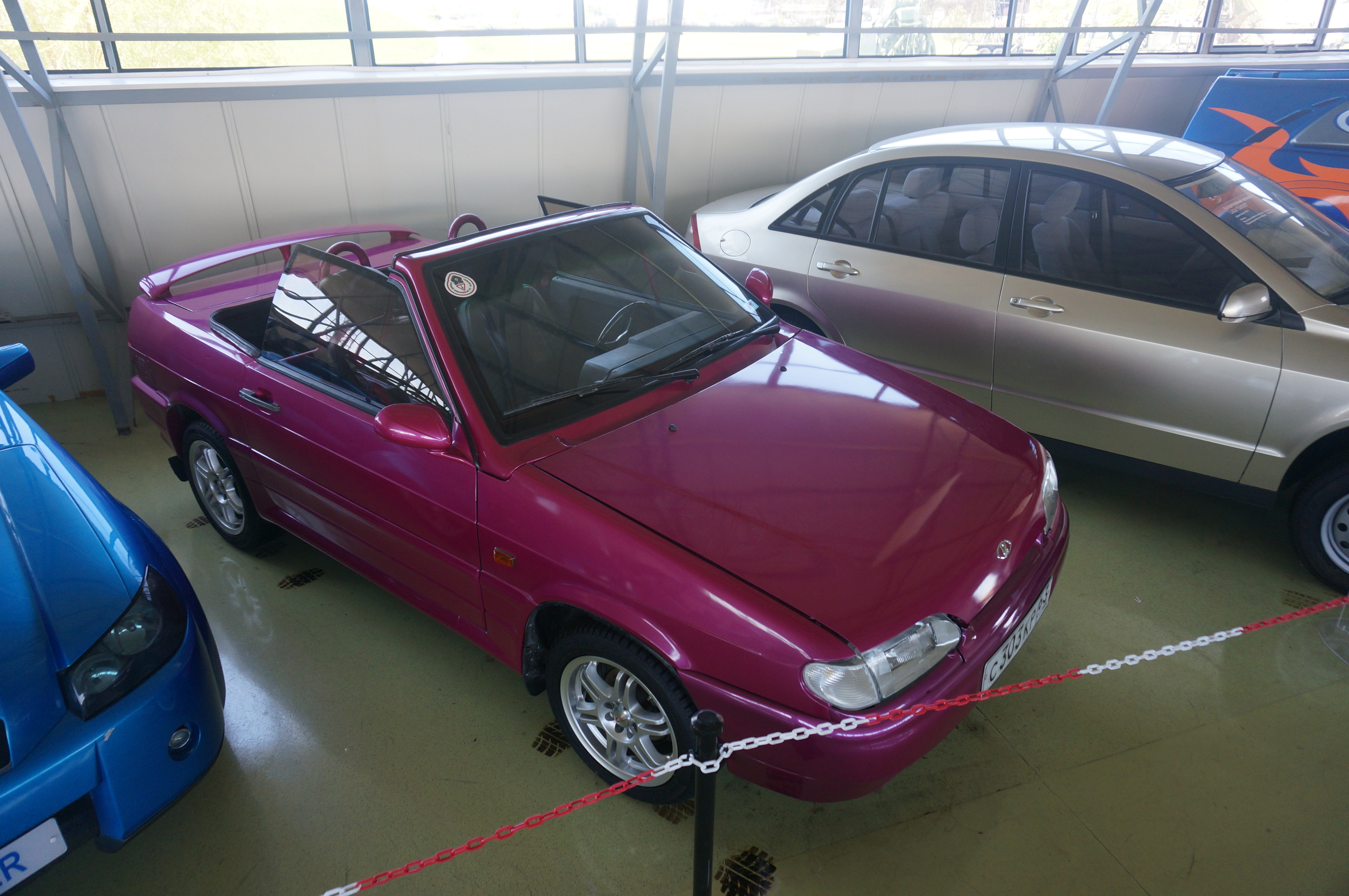
VAZ 2113 Cabrio Concept

== Technical specifications ==
- Available Trims: many were available through the years and on different markets. Many trim options seen in Western Europe were actually importer upgrades.

Engine type

- Engine designation: VAZ 21081, VAZ 2108, VAZ 21083, VAZ 21084; VAZ 415 (wankel type)
- Valvetrain: OHC
- Displacement (cc): 1100, 1288, 1500, 1568; 2x654 for Wankel engine
- Bore (mm): 76.0, 76.0, 82.0, 82.0
- Stroke (mm): 60.6, 71.0, 71.0, 74.2
- Compression Ratio: 9.0 :1, 9.8:1, 9.8:1, 9,8:1
- Net Power: 53 hp (39 kW) at 5600 rpm (1100)

65 hp (48 kW) at 5600 rpm (1300)
72–77 hp (53–57 kW) at 4800 rpm (1500)
90 hp (66 kW) at 5600 rpm (1600)
140 hp (103 kW) at 6000 rpm (Wankel)

- Fuel System: 2 barrel carburettor or multipoint electronic fuel injection
- Recommended Fuel: Regular Unleaded, 87 Octane

Drivetrain

- Configuration :
  - Front-engine, front-wheel-drive
- Transmission :
  - 4 or 5 forward synchromesh, 1 reverse (4-speed gearbox was used on early cars)

Chassis

- Type :
  - 3-door hatchback (VAZ 2108)
  - 5-door hatchback (VAZ 2109)
  - 4-door sedan (VAZ 21099)
- Later styling of all Samara vehicles was updated, and they received new designations:
  - 3-door hatchback (VAZ 2113)
  - 5-door hatchback (VAZ 2114)
  - 4-door sedan (VAZ 2115)

There are various commercial and specialty conversions.

- Suspension (front): MacPherson strut with coil spring
- Suspension (rear): Longitudinal arms and cross beam with coil springs
- Steering (type): Rack-and-pinion
- Brakes (type): Power-assisted
- Brakes (front): Discs
- Brakes (Rear): Drums
- Wheels (size): 13 inch
- Tires (type): Steel-belted all-season radials
- Tires (size and Rating): 165/70x13

== Safety by modern standards ==
The RosLada-made 2109 version of the Samara scored 2.7 points out of 16 in a frontal crash test conducted by the Russian ARCAP safety assessment program in 2002, demonstrating a durable car body but lacking modern passive safety equipment. Two years later, the 2114 five-door variant was awarded half a star out of a possible four by ARCAP, showing moderate pressure on the head, neck, chest and hips of the crash test dummy but excessive on the shins.

== Trims ==
=== First generation ===
For 2003, there were three levels trims: Standard (the notation (standing after the index model) 00, models with distributed injection of fuel 20, such as the VAZ-21083-00), Norma (the notation 01 and 21) and Luxe (the notation 02 and 22) that vehicles with different bodies differed.

In the version with body three-door hatchback Standard grade includes the onboard control system, tweed seat upholstery, metallic color, luggage rack, front head restraints; in version 20 were also microprocessor ignition system, the electro-door locks, immobilizer. In the configuration Norma added tweed seat covers with pockets in the front seats, door trim tweed, trim the trunk, anti-glare visor with mirror; in the version of 21 were also converter and a system for collecting gasoline vapors. In the Luxe configuration added headlamp cleaning system, exterior mirrors with antidazzle effect and tinted windows.

In the version with five-door hatchback body Standard equipment included a tweed seat upholstery with pockets in the front seats, fabric inserts tweed upholstered doors, trunk trim, trunk rack, front head restraints, metallic color; version of the 20 had the same differences as in other bodies. In the configuration Norma added rear headrests and anti-glare visor with mirror. In the Luxe configuration added front electric windows and fog lamps.

In the version with the sedan body configuration were the same as the five-door hatchback, with the exception of the fog lights that have appeared in version Norma.

=== Second generation ===
There were two levels of equipment: Norma and Luxe. The Norma grade included steel wheels, immobilizer, central locking, tweed seat upholstery and door, height adjustable steering column, front electric windows, front head restraints, tailgate spoiler / tailgate, moldings on the doors. Luxe trim different caps on the wheels, trip computer, velvet upholstery seats and doors, athermal glass windows, rear headrests, a mirror in the sun visor of the passenger and heated front seats.
