= United Automotive Technologies =

United Automotive Technologies LLC
- Native name: ООО Объединенные автомобильные технологии
- Company type: Subsidiary
- Industry: Automotive
- Founded: 2008; 18 years ago
- Headquarters: Tolyatti, Samara Oblast, Russia
- Key people: Firdaus Kabirov (CEO)
- Products: Auto parts
- Revenue: ▼3,974.81 million ₽ (2020)
- Operating income: ▼ ₽1.44 million (2020)
- Net income: ▼ ₽1.15 million (2020)
- Total assets: ▲ ₽3,474.73 million (2020)
- Total equity: ▲ ₽190.10 million (2020)
- Parent: KAMAZ
- Website: td-oat.ru

United Automotive Technologies (Russian: Объединенные Автомобильные Технологии, romanized: Ob"yedinennyye Avtomobil'nyye Tekhnologii) also known by its Russian-language initialism OAT, is a Russia-based automotive industry holding owned by KAMAZ.

== History ==
United Automotive Technologies was established in 2008 by Rostec to consolidate the supply of domestic auto parts. By 2012, it took control of AvtoVAZ assets formerly belonging to the SOK Group. In 2015, AvtoVAZ tried to purchase United Automotive Technologies, but the deal fell through. In February 2018, Rostec sold United Automotive Technologies to KAMAZ (49%) and its subsidiary Remdiesel (51%). The Remdiesel stake was later transferred to SpetsAvtoKam.

In June 2019, the United Automotive Technologies group liquidated PKH Autocomponents, a debt-ridden, money-losing subsidiary holding that controlled group's assets in Dimitrovgrad and the Penza Oblast. The group took direct control of said assets.

In November 2021, AvtoVAZ said it again planned to acquire a stake in United Automotive Technologies. If the acquisition is completed, the holding will become a joint venture owned by KAMAZ (45%), AvtoVAZ (40%) and Spetsavtokam (15%).

== Operations ==
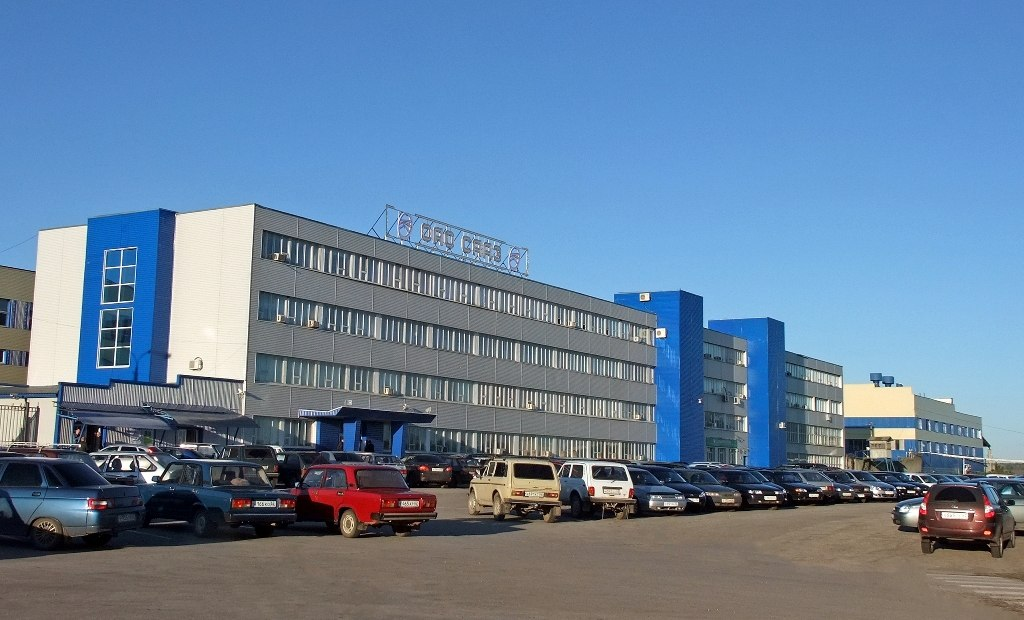
SAAZ Komplekt head offices

United Automotive Technologies is a holding of companies that manufacture and sell auto parts for Russian vehicle manufacturers, including AvtoVAZ (over 90% of its sales), KAMAZ, GAZ, and UAZ.

As of December 2021, the companies controlled by United Automotive Technologies were: DAAZ LLC (radiators, fuel systems, cooling systems; stamp-welded assemblies; aluminum casting; production of tooling equipment and tools), DZPM LLC (powder metallurgy) and Avtosvet LLC (lighting equipment) in Dimitrovgrad; RosAvtoPlast LLC (plastic granulate), JSC Motor-Super (filters, plastic parts), JSC VIS and EVR LLC (both suspension and brake system) in Tolyatti; Saaz Komplekt LLC (struts, shock absorbers) in the Ryazan Oblast; PJSC OSVAR (lighting engineering) in the Vladimir Oblast; JSC SMZ (stamp-welded parts) and OAT Cargo LLC (transport) in the Penza Oblast.
