= SOK Group =

Russian holding company

- Company type: Closed joint-stock company
- Industry: Diversified
- Founded: 1994
- Defunct: 2011
- Headquarters: Samara, Russia
- Website: www.sok.ru

The SOK Group (Russian: Группа «СОК») was a Russian holding company established in 1994 and based in Samara, Russia. Yuri Kachmazov was the group's president.

The name SOK was originally an acronym for 'Samara Window Company'.

== History ==
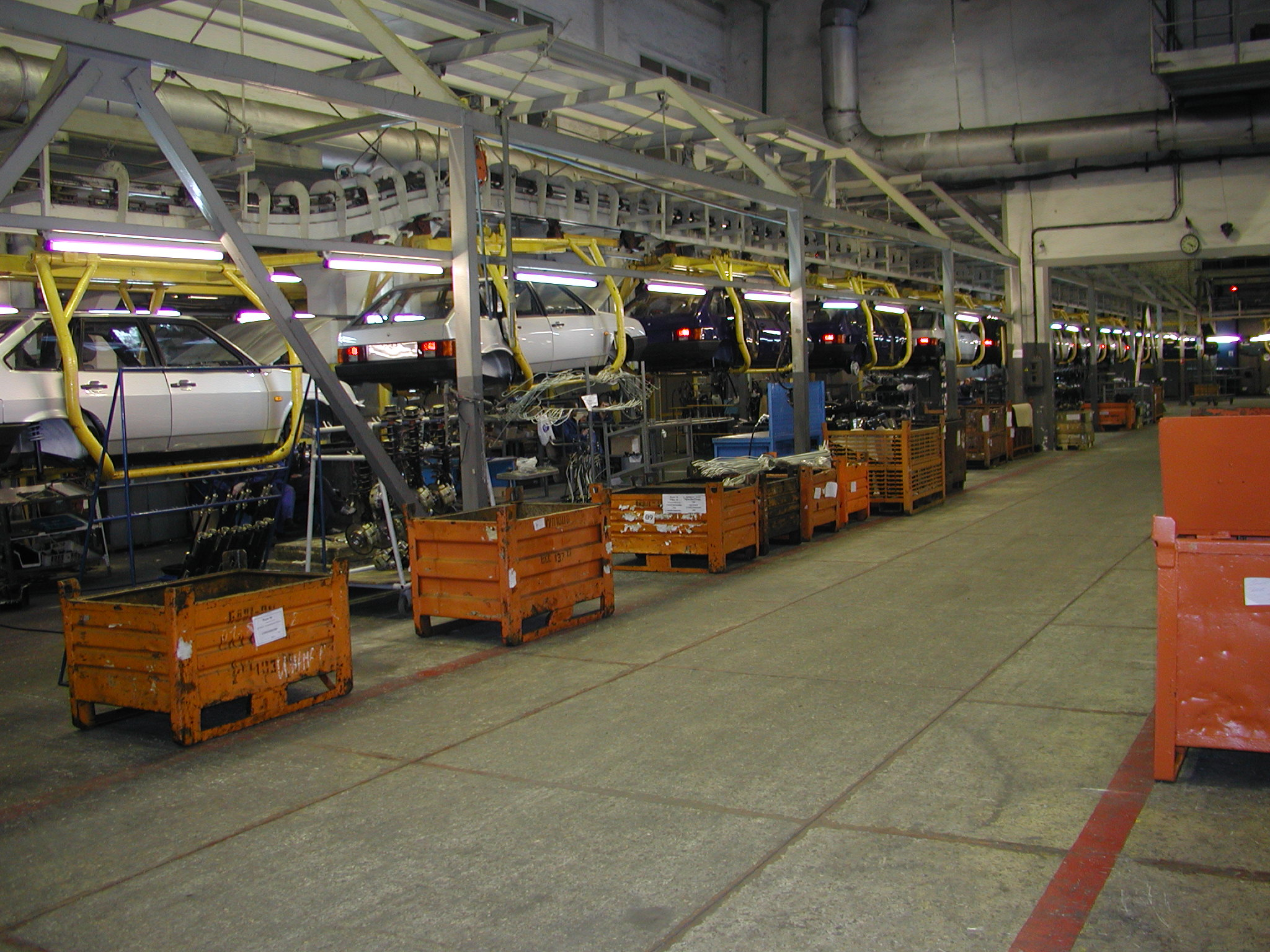
The RosLada factory in 2005

The SOK Group started in 1994 as an AvtoVAZ dealership, growing to become one of the main automotive companies in Russia. SOK managed to gain control of RosLada, an automotive plant that had been established in 1998 on the grounds of the former Luch Design Bureau in Syzran, and used it to produce old AvtoVAZ models.

In 1999 the ownership of the Izhmash-Avto plant in Izhevsk, which produced old AvtoVAZ models under the Izh brand, was transferred to the group. SOK also included over 40 other factories, mostly in the automotive component business, and employed over 100,000 workers.

Revenues grew from $19 million in 1999 to close to $200 million in 2002. It was the second largest passenger car producer in Russia after AvtoVAZ, with production totaling 121,172 cars in 2002. In August 2003 VAZInterService became part of the group.

By 2004 the group had $2 billion in revenues and supplied 37%-50% of all AvtoVAZ accessories; AvtoVAZ could not withdraw from such cooperation agreements without paying SOK $492 million in penalties. In October 2005 SOK reportedly owned over 60% of AvtoVAZ shares, and ousted Vladimir Kadannikov, the company's chairman.

SOK group attempted to gain control of AvtoVAZ, which was instead gained by the state-owned Rostec corporation. The Rostec-appointed AvtoVAZ management began to phase out or rescind supply contracts between SOK and AvtoVAZ.

In 2008, SOK began negotiations to sell the IzhAvto plant to AvtoVAZ. In 2009 the group was forced to sell its automotive components holdings to AvtoVAZ, after SOK had disrupted the schedule of deliveries to the company. The components business ultimately came under control of Rostec as the United Automotive Technologies group. In 2010 the president of the group, wanted over allegations of fraudulent conveyance during the IzhAvto bankruptcy of 2009, escaped to the United Arab Emirates. The group's last assets were sold in January 2013.

== Models ==
Car models produced by the group:

- VAZ-2106
- VAZ-21043
- VAZ-2107
- Izh 2126
- Izh 2117
- VAZ-21093

== Non-automotive assets ==
- Promek Bank, later sold to Societe Generale
- TV channel Orion
- Volgomost, a bridge construction company
