= Automotive industry in Russia =

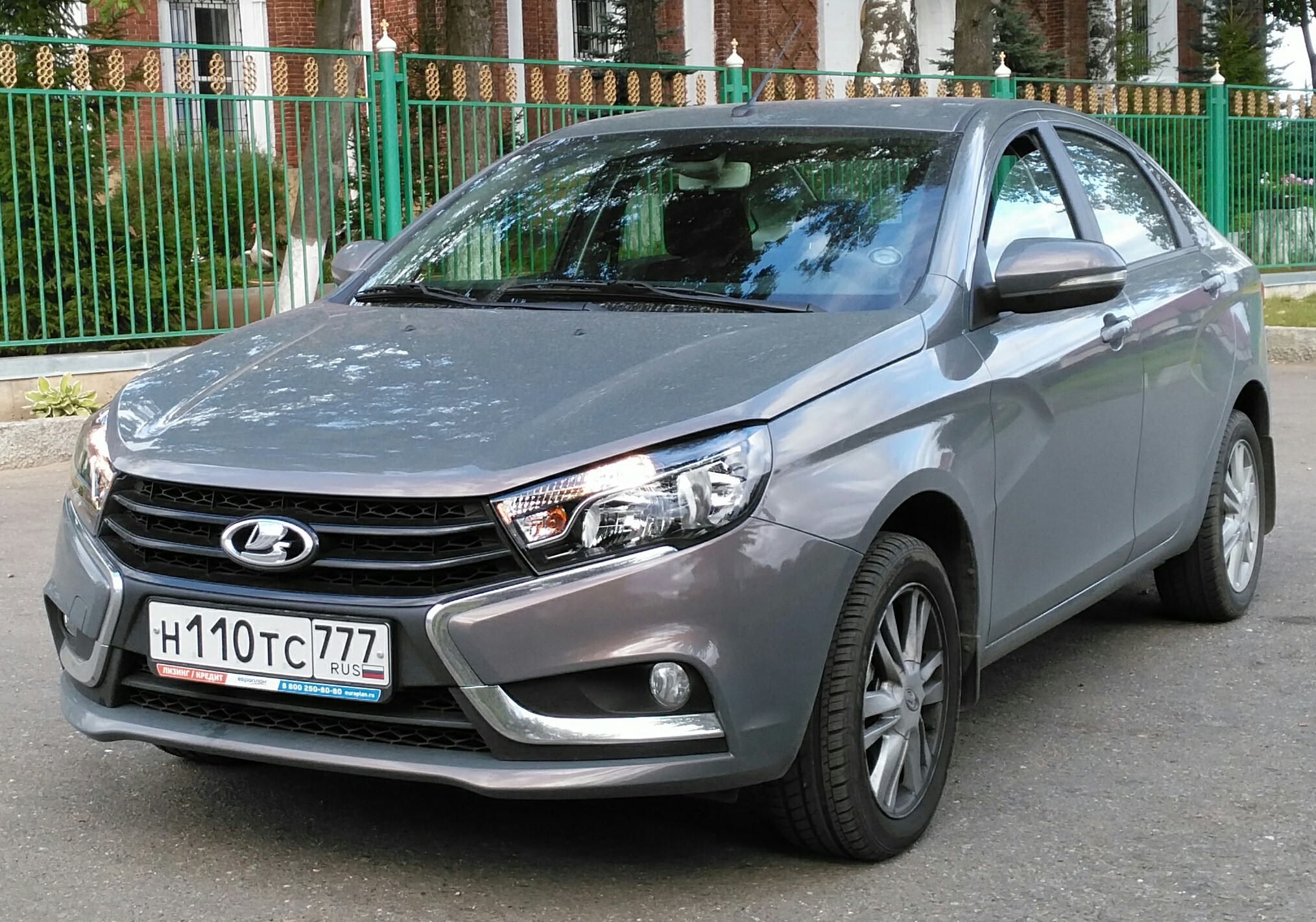
Lada Vesta went into production in 2015

Automotive production is a significant industry in Russia, directly employing around 600,000 people or 1% of the country's total workforce. Russia produced 1,767,674 vehicles in 2018, ranking 13th among car-producing nations in 2018, and accounting for 1.8% of the worldwide production. The main local brands are light vehicle producers AvtoVAZ and GAZ, while KamAZ is the leading heavy vehicle producer. Eleven foreign carmakers have production operations or are their plants in Russia. As of 2025, 57.2% of all cars sold in Russia were from Chinese brands, followed by Russian brands at at 30.7%.

== History ==
External videos
- on Za Rulem Official YouTube Channel(in Russian)
- ABS for Lada: made in Russia! ABS Itelma Vesta. on YouTube
- NEW MOTOR! Lada Vesta 1.8 EVO without oil burner / VAZ-21179 engine and CVT. on YouTube
- ESP for Lada: made in Russia! Stabilization system, ABS Lada Vesta Itelma. on YouTube

=== Early history ===
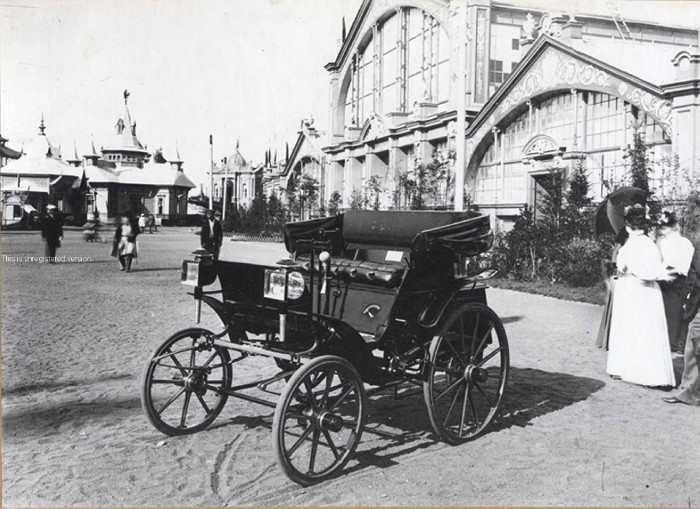
Yakovlev & Freze (1896)

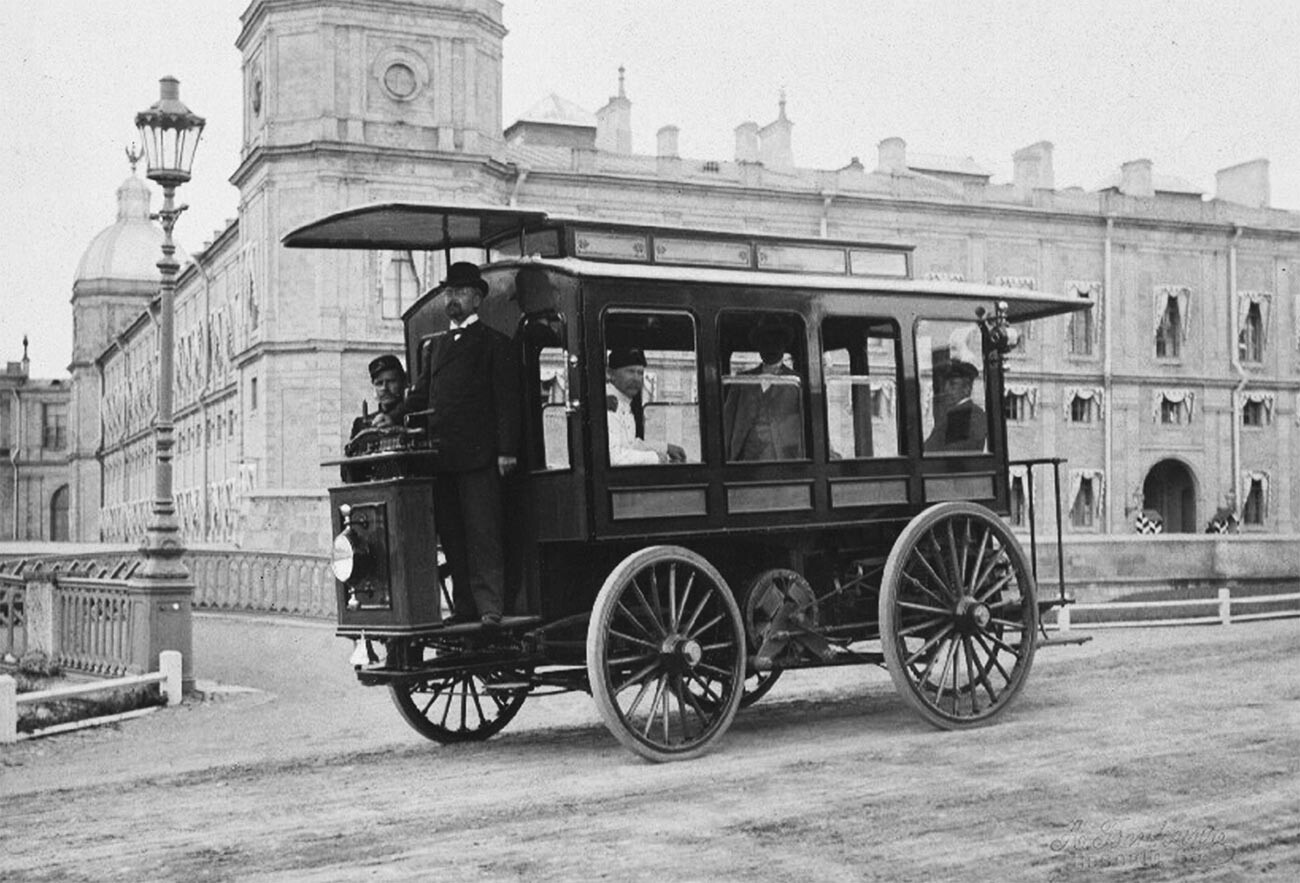
Hippolyte Romanov's electric bus in Gatchina

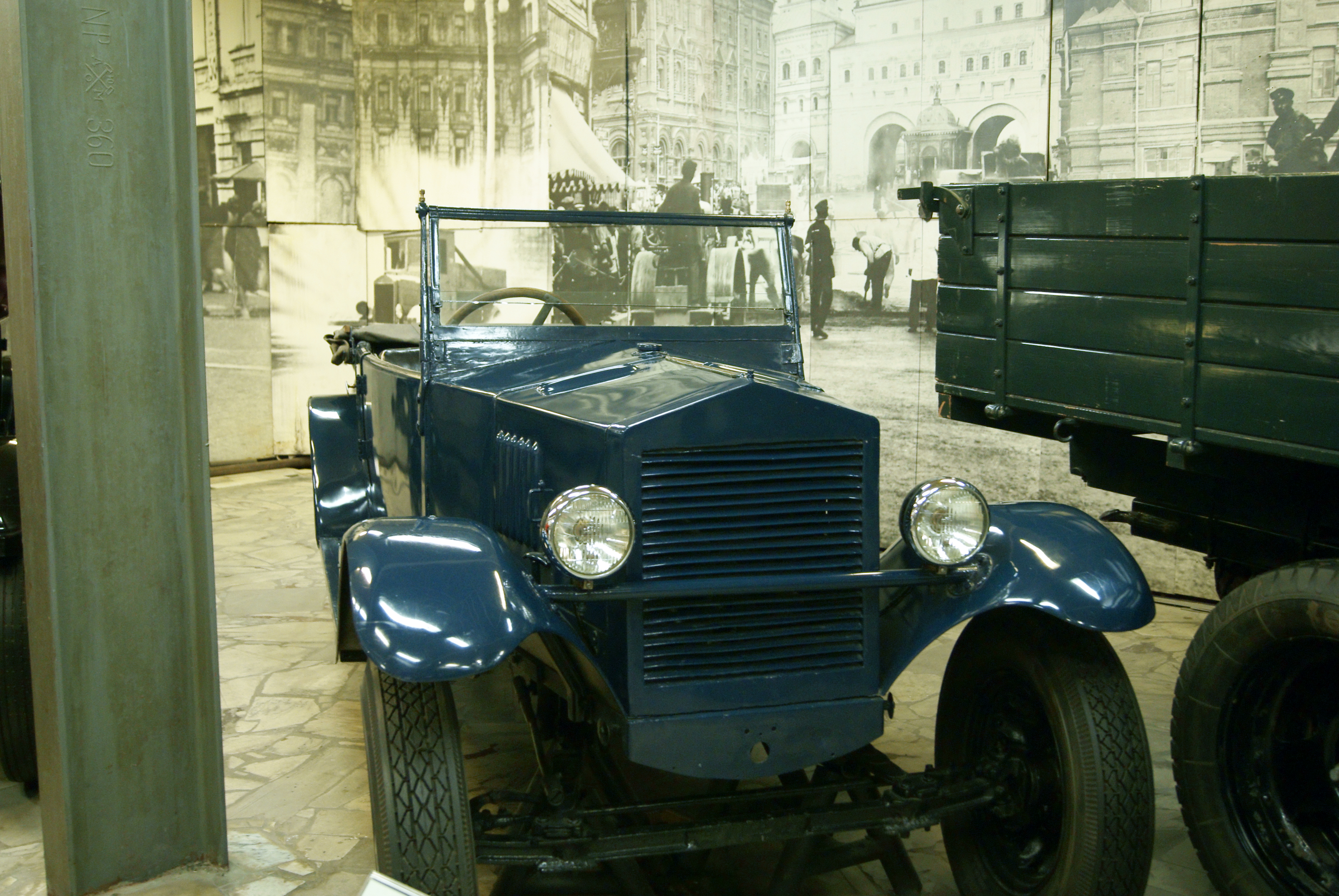
NAMI 1 (1927)

The Russian Empire had a long history of progress in the development of machinery. As early as in the eighteenth century Ivan I. Polzunov constructed the first two-cylinder steam engine in the world, while Ivan P. Kulibin created a human-powered vehicle that had a flywheel, a brake, a gearbox, and roller bearings. One of the world's first tracked vehicles was invented by Fyodor A. Blinov in 1877. In 1896, the Yakovlev engine factory and the Freze carriage-manufacturing workshop manufactured the first Russian petrol-engine automobile, the Yakovlev & Freze.

The turn of the nineteenth and twentieth centuries was marked by the invention of the earliest Russian electro car, nicknamed the "Cuckoo", which was created by the engineer Hippolyte V. Romanov in 1899. Romanov also constructed a battery-electric omnibus. In the years preceding the 1917 October Revolution, Russia produced a growing number of Russo-Balt, Puzyryov, Lessner, and other vehicles, held its first motor show in 1907 and had car enthusiasts who successfully participated in international motor racing. A Russo-Balt car placed 9th in the Monte Carlo Rally of 1912, despite the extreme winter conditions that threatened the lives of the driver and riding mechanic on their way from Saint Petersburg, 2nd in the San Sebastián Rally and covered more than 15,000 km in Western Europe and Northern Africa in 1913. The driver of the car, Andrei P. Nagel, was personally awarded by Emperor Nicholas II for increasing the prestige of the domestic car brand.

By 1915, about 1,000 motor vehicles had been built in Russia. Imported vehicles vastly exceeded domestic production, with the latter accounting for less than 10% of total stock by 1914.

In February 1916 the Tsarist government allocated funds for the construction of six automotive plants: AMO in Moscow, Russo-Balt in the village of Fili, the State Plant of Military Self-Propelled Vehicles (KZVS) in Mytishchi, Russian Renault in Rybinsk, Aksai in Nakhichevan-on-Don, and Lebedev in Yaroslavl. None of the plants were completed before the October Revolution.

=== Soviet era ===
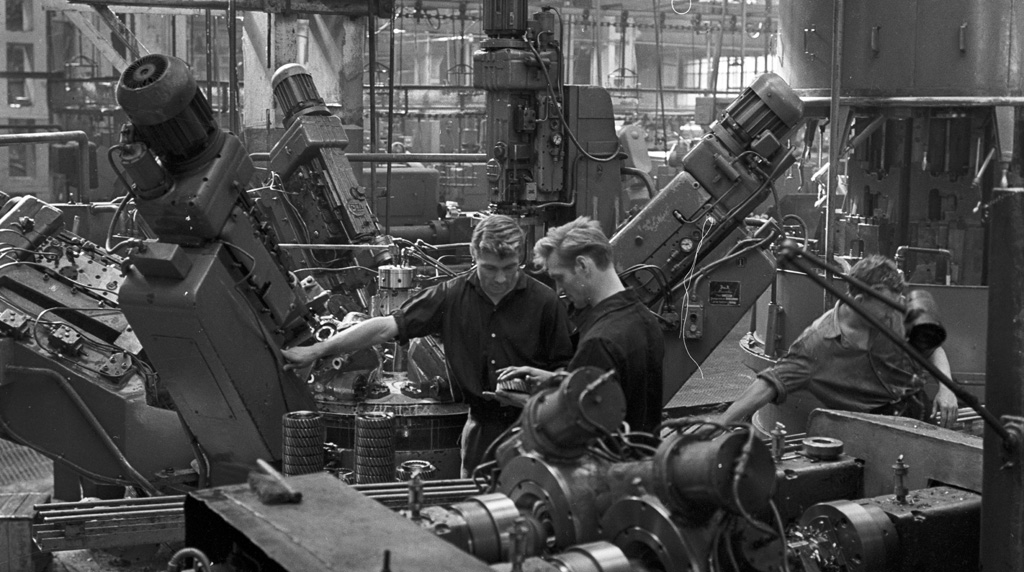
Workers of Moscow ZiL, 1963

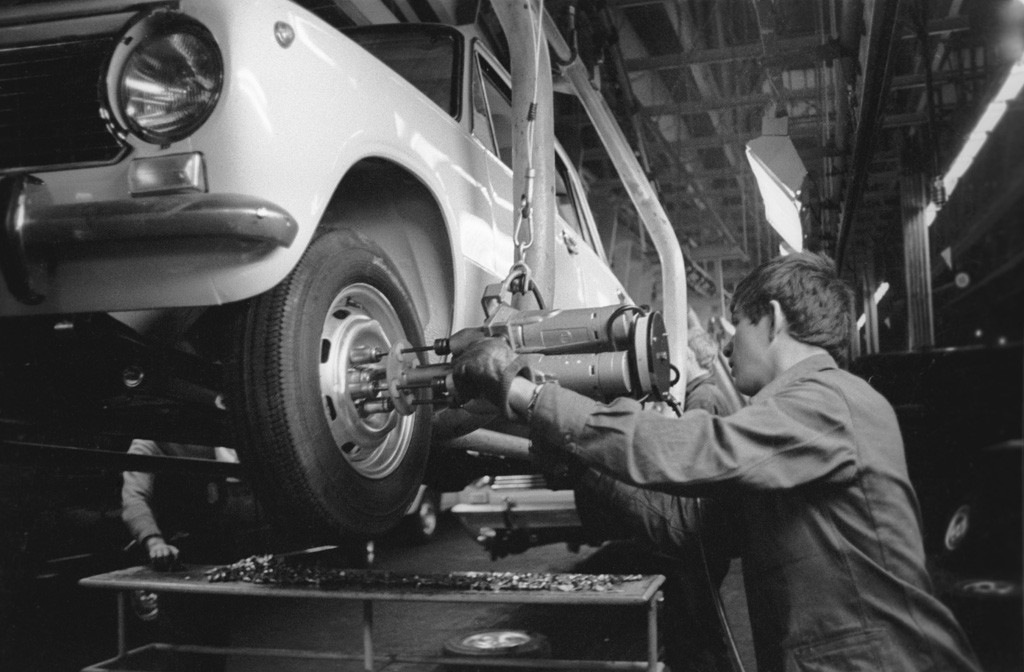
The AvtoVAZ assembly line in 1969

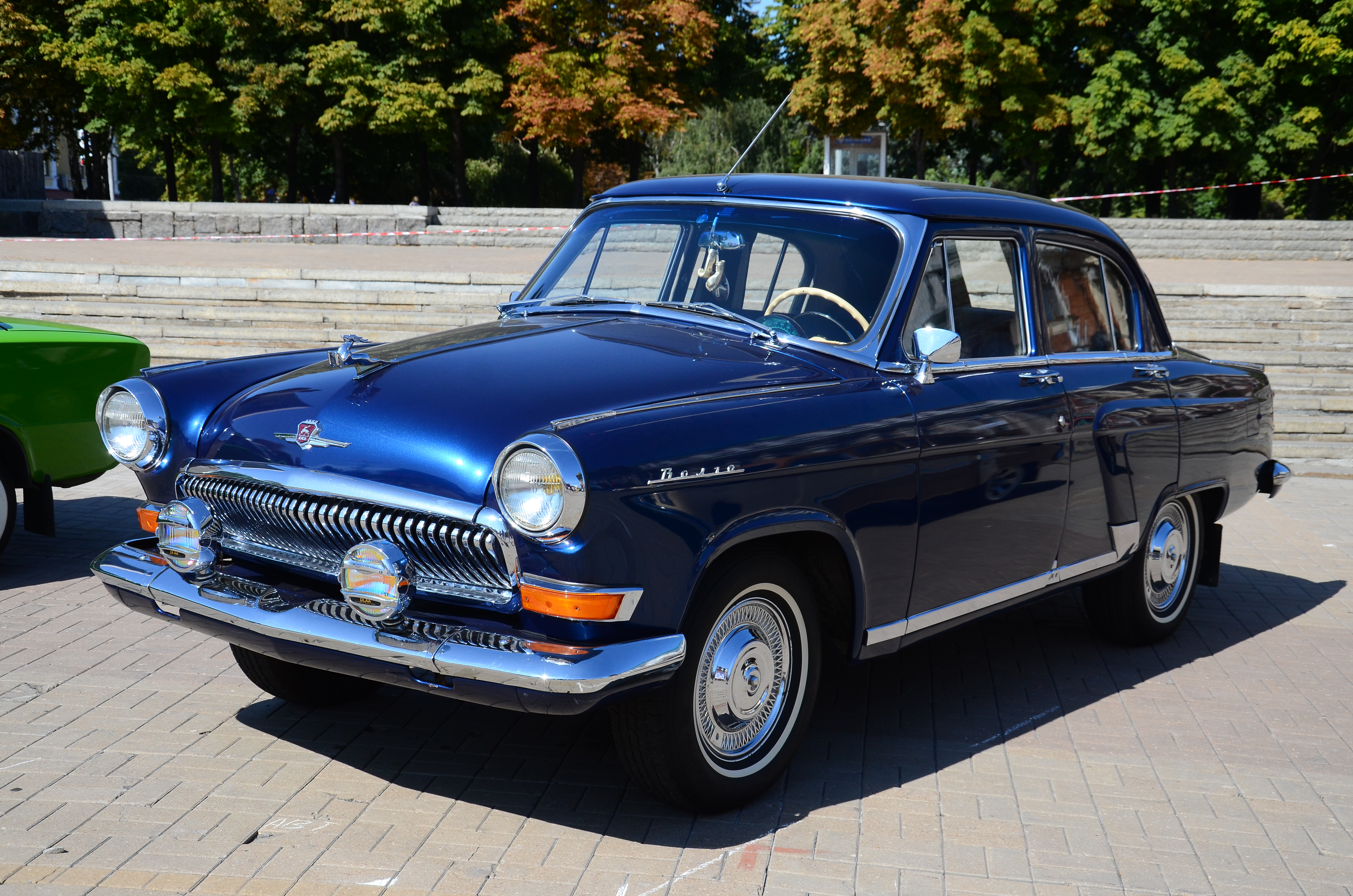
A GAZ-21 Volga

After the 1917 October Revolution, Russo-Balt was nationalised on 15 August 1918, and renamed to Prombron by the new leadership. It continued the production of Russo-Balt cars and launched a new model on 8 October 1922, while AMO built FIAT 15 Ter trucks under licence and released a more modern FIAT-derived truck developed by a team of AMO designers, the AMO-F-15. About 6,000–6,500 F-15s were built in the years 1924–1931.

In 1927, engineers from the Scientific Automobile & Motor Institute (NAMI) created the first original Soviet car NAMI-I, which was produced in small numbers by the Spartak State Automobile Factory in Moscow, between 1927 and 1931. In 1929, due to a rapidly growing demand for automobiles and in cooperation with its trade partner, the Ford Motor Company, the Supreme Soviet of the National Economy established GAZ. A year later, a second automobile plant was founded in Moscow, which would become a major Soviet car maker after World War II and earn nationwide fame under the name Moskvitch.

The beginning of the 1960s saw the release of the Moskvitch 408, intended to be an economy car that would spread the use of cars among the population. Other manufacturers such as MZMA, GAZ and ZAZ were offering a variety of cars intended for the mass market. The Soviet government opted to build an even larger car manufacturing plant that would produce a people's car and help to meet the demand for personal transport. For reasons of cost-efficiency, it was decided to produce the car on the basis of an existing, modern foreign model. After considering several options, the Fiat 124 was chosen because of its simple and sturdy design, being easy to manufacture and repair.

The plant was built in just 4 years (1966–1970) in the small town of Stavropol Volzhsky, which later grew to a population of more than half a million and was renamed Togliatti to commemorate Palmiro Togliatti. At the same time, the Izhmash car plant was established in the city of Izhevsk as part of the Izhevsk Mechanical Plant, with the initiative coming from the Minister of Defence and in order to increase the overall production of cars in the Soviet Union. It produced Moskvitchs and Moskvitch-based kombi hatchbacks. KamAZ, Europe's largest heavy truck plant, was built in Naberezhnye Chelny, while GAZ, ZIL, UralAZ, KrAZ, MAZ, BelAZ, and plants continued to produce other types of trucks.

By the early 1980s, Soviet automobile industry consisted of several main plants, which produced vehicles for various market segments. In late 1987, the industry produced 2 million cars, satisfying 45% of the domestic demand.

=== Post-Soviet adjustments ===
In the early 1990s the Russian car market expanded dramatically, largely due to a drastic cut on import duties, so that by 1993 foreign-made imported cars made up 49% of all sales. At the same time, Russian automakers were integrated into a market economy and immediately hit by a crisis due to the loss of financial support, economic turmoil, criminal activities and stiffer competition in the domestic market during the 1990s.

The main domestic manufacturers in the early 1990s were AvtoVAZ, AZLK, IzhAvto, GAZ and UAZ. Some of them, like AvtoVAZ, turned to cooperation with other companies (such as GM-AvtoVAZ) in order to obtain substantial capital investment and overcome the crisis.

By 1993, total output was down 14% compared to 1990 levels. Lada's declining sales during the 1990s, and toughening European Union emissions requirements, saw exports to Western Europe discontinued by the end of the decade. Lada had enjoyed particularly strong sales in Britain, peaking at more than 30,000 sales a year in the late 1980s, but had failed to remain competitive with other budget brands over the subsequent few years.

850,000 cars were sold in 1996. As demand kept rising, local brands continued to be affected by a reputation for poor manufacturing quality. It was estimated in 1996 that a newly bought AvtoVAZ car needed $1–2,000 worth of repairs to bring it to a comfortable level of safety.

The 1998 Russian financial crisis affected the industry, as car manufacturers stopped using imported components because of higher import prices. Nevertheless, the industry quickly recovered in subsequent years.

In 1997, car production increased by 13.2% in comparison with 1996 and achieved 981,000. AvtoVAZ and UAZ extended their output by 8.8 and 52 percent respectively, whereas KamAZ doubled it. The overall truck production in Russia increased by 7 percent, reaching 148,000 in 1997 and 184,000 in 2000. The overall production of cars rose from about 800,000 in 1993 to more than 1.16 million in 2000, or 965,000 (969,235 according to OICA) excluding commercial vehicles.

Throughout the 1990s, the unavailability of dealer financing meant that cars had to be purchased in cash.

=== 2000 to 2008 ===
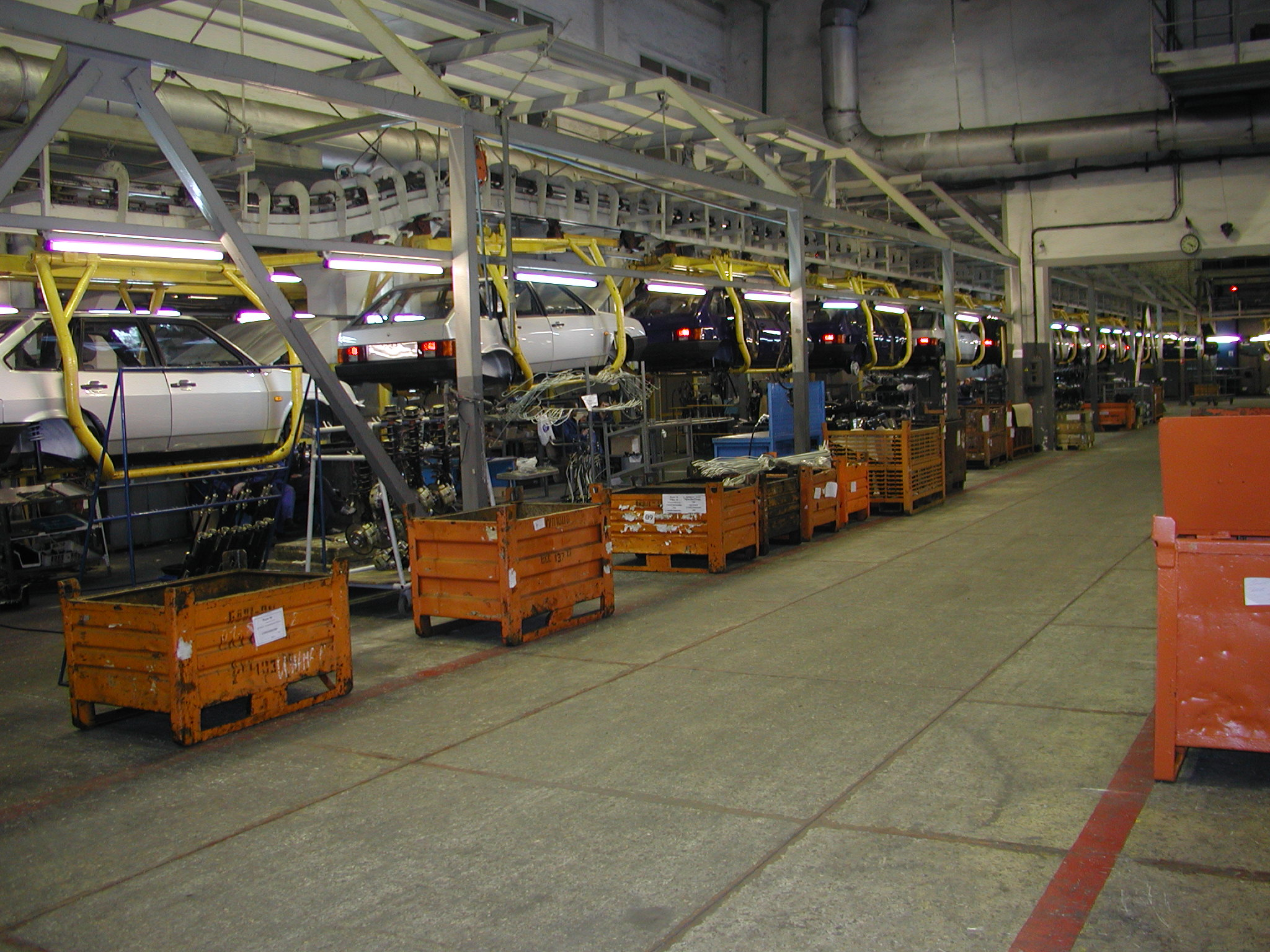
Lada Samara assembly line in 2005

In the early 2000s, the Russian economy recovered. Russian metal companies, having achieved significant profits on foreign markets, sought to invest in Russia's automotive sector. Siberian Aluminum initially bought Pavlovo Bus Factory and accumulated increasing ownership stakes in GAZ. At the same time, Severstal gained control of UAZ.

In 2001 Ford became the first western manufacturer to establish its own assembly plant in Russia, investing $150 million in their Vsevolozhsk factory, manufacturing the Ford Focus, which briefly became the best-selling foreign-branded car in Russia.

In 2003 Russian manufacturers still accounted for over 90% of car production in Russia, either under their own brand or in partnership with a foreign company. The six main automotive groups were AvtoVAZ, SOK Group, Kamaz, RusPromAvto, SeverstalAvto and AZLK. Just 11,000 cars were locally assembled by foreign manufacturers in 2002.

Macroeconomic trends were strong and growing incomes of the population led to a surging demand, and by 2005 the Russian car market was booming. In 2005, 1,446,525 new cars were sold, including 832,200 Russian models and 614,325 foreign ones.

During the first quarter of 2005, foreign-branded cars outsold local ones for the first time in Russian history (including used imports). Foreign companies started to massively invest in production in Russia: the number of foreign cars produced in the Russian Federation surged from 157,179 in 2005 to 456,500 in 2007. To keep up with the competition, local brands launched more modern-looking models, such as Lada Kalina.

The value of the Russian market grew at a brisk pace: 14% in 2005, 36% in 2006 and 67% in 2007—making it the world's fastest growing automotive market by 2008. Foreign companies started flocking to enter Russia in the 2000s, seeing it as a local production location and export powerhouse. Russia's labour, material and energy costs were only 1/6 compared to those in Western Europe.

To boost the market share of locally produced vehicles, the Russian government implemented several protectionist measures and launched programs to attract foreign producers into the country. In late 2005, the Russian leadership enacted legislation to create special economic zones (SEZ) with the aim of encouraging investments by foreign automotive companies. The benefits of operating in the special economic zones include tax allowances, exemption from asset and land taxes and protection against changes in the tax regime. Some regions also provide extensive support for large investors (over $100 million.) These include Saint Petersburg/Leningrad Oblast (Toyota, GM, Nissan) and Kaluga Oblast (VW). Kaluga has been especially successful in attracting foreign companies, as has been Kaliningrad Oblast.

=== 2008 financial crisis ===
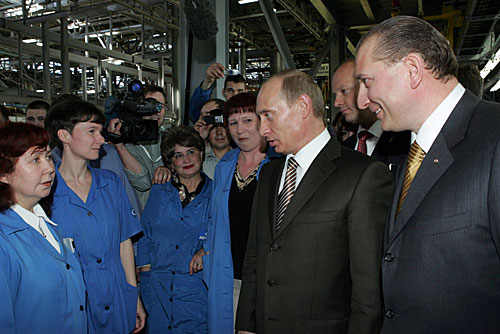
President Vladimir Putin meeting with AvtoVAZ employees in the company's factory in Tolyatti.

Russia's automotive industry was hit hard by the Great Recession. Production of passenger cars dropped from 1,470,000 units in 2008 to just 597,000 units in 2009. Lorry production fell from 256,000 to 91,000 in the same period.

In late 2008, the Russian government introduced protectionist measures, worth $5 billion, to improve the situation in the industry. This included $2 billion of bailouts for troubled companies and $3 billion of credits for buyers of Russian cars. Prime minister Vladimir Putin described the move as vital in order to save jobs. The tariffs for imported foreign cars and trucks were increased to a minimum of 50% and go up to 100%. The tariffs are linked to the engine size of the vehicle. The increased duties led to protests in Russian cities, most notably in Vladivostok, where the importation of Japanese cars is an important sector of the city's economy. To compensate for the losses of the Vladivostok businesses, Prime Minister Putin ordered the car manufacturing company Sollers to move one of its factories from Moscow to Vladivostok. The move was completed in 2009, and the factory now employs about 700 locals. It was planned to produce 13,200 cars in Vladivostok in 2010.

The most efficient anti-crisis measure executed by the Russian government was the introduction of a car scrappage scheme in March 2010. Under the scheme, buyers of new cars could receive a subsidy of up to 600,000 rubles (US$20,000). Sales of Russia's largest carmaker Avtovaz doubled in the second quarter of 2010 as a result, and the company returned to profit.

=== Recent developments ===
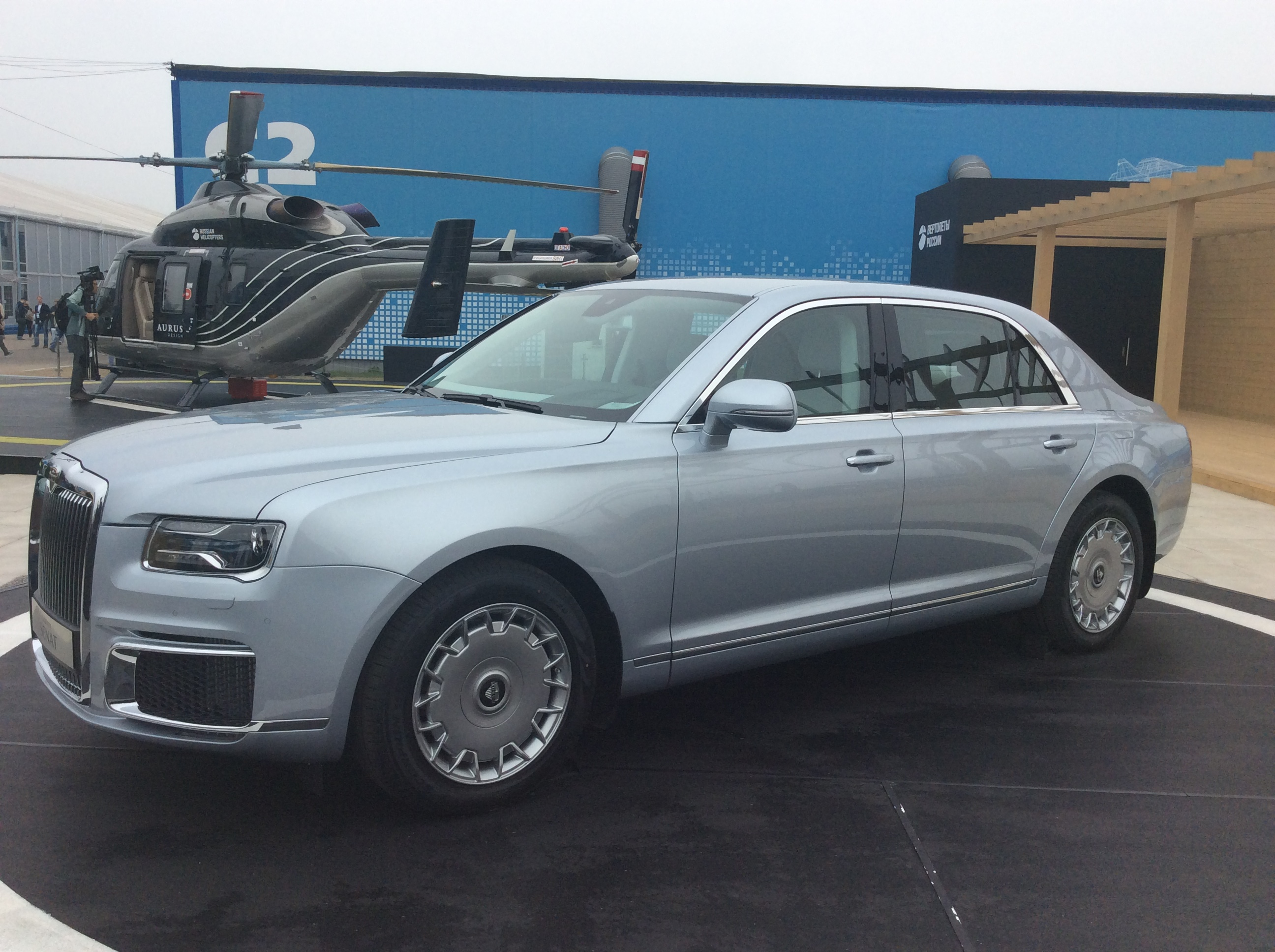
Aurus Senat, a recent armored limousine project by NAMI

By the end of 2010, automotive production had returned to pre-crisis levels. Nine out of the ten most sold models in Russia in 2010 were domestically produced, with Avtovaz's Lada models topping the list. In the first 7 months of 2010, sales of Lada cars increased by 60%, the Korean KIA reported a jump of 101%, and Chevrolet's sales rose by 15%.

In 2010, Russia was the world's 15th largest producer of cars. The Russian automotive industry currently (as of 2010) accounts for about 2% of worldwide car production.

The market share of Russian-branded vehicles fell to 34% in 2010 and to 21% in 2012. At the same time, the market share of foreign-branded cars made in Russia kept rising, reaching 45% in 2012. Imported vehicles account for a sizable portion of the Russian automotive market: in 2014 they made up 27% of cars and 46% of trucks.

The 2014 economic crisis led to a new fall in car sales and production levels, and reduced forecasts for future growth.

The number of cars on Russian roads reached 40,629,200 in 2016. Lada cars accounted for 34.6% of the total, down from 41.6% five years earlier. Almost half of those cars were over ten years old, and the single most popular car model was still the classic Lada Riva.

While Chinese cars were a long way off from conquering the market, they have significantly bolstered their positions. The best dynamics are being demonstrated by Chery, while other Chinese brands, such as Haval and Geely, are also gaining popularity in Russia. The international sanctions led to a rapid increase in the market share of Chinese vehicle manufacturers. In 2025, 57.2% of all cars sold in Russia were from Chinese brands, up from 6.9% in 2021.

=== Import substitution era ===
Following the Russian invasion of Ukraine, car sales and production dropped significantly due to the imposition of sanctions on Russia, with only around 4000 cars produced in May 2022. Following this, the Russian government temporarily reduced requirements for airbags, seatbelt pretensioners, anti-lock braking systems and emissions standards.

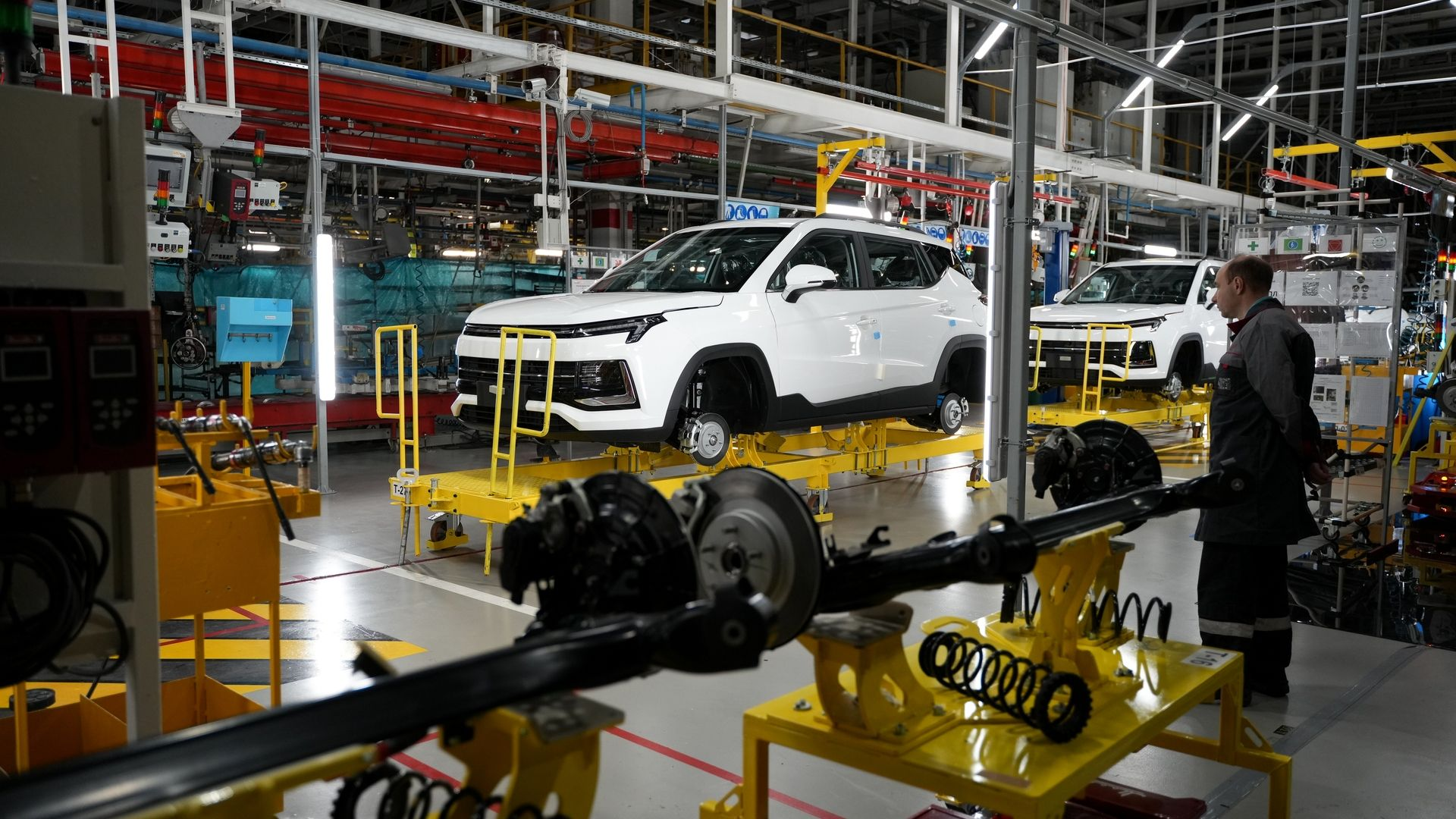
Moskvitch 3 vehicles assembled at JSC Moscow Automobile Plant Moskvitch.

In May 2022, Renault sold its Moscow plant to the Government of Moscow which intended to nationalise the facility for renewed production of vehicles under the Moskvitch marque. Moskvitch presented its new range of models on 6 July 2022: a sedan and 3 SUVs, Model I having both a fuel version as well as an electric version. The cars have names made up of Roman numerals, from I and II to IV. On 26 December 2022, the Moskvitch 3 and Moskvitch 3e went on sale in Russia, with the Sehol X4 based cars produced in association with truck manufacturer Kamaz and China based JAC Motors. In mid July 2023, the company reported that they had produced more than 11,000 vehicles since the start of production.

In June 2023, the production of domestically produced anti-lock braking and electronic stability control systems began at the Pegas Electromechanical Plant in Kostroma. The planned production capacity of the plant would be 850,000 units per year, with the possibility of expanding to 1,200,000 if necessary. Subsequently, the earlier declared simplified rules for the production of vehicles in Russia remain in place until February 2024, albeit with a phased return of requirements. From June 2023, vehicles must comply with at least Euro 2 emissions standards, as well as be equipped with anti-lock brake systems by December 2023.

== Manufacturers ==
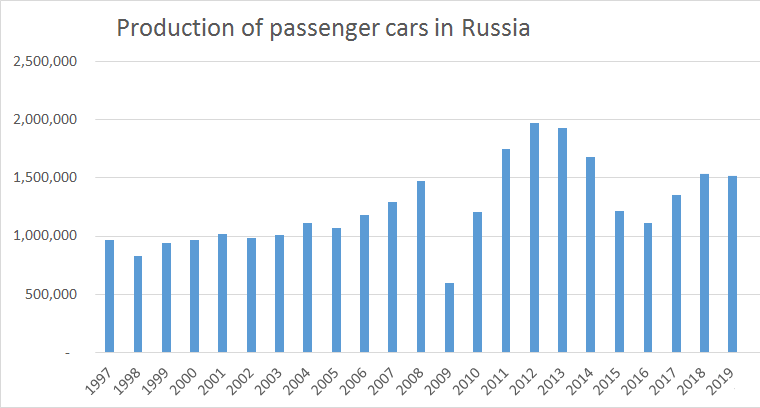
Cars produced in Russia between 1997 and 2015

The Russian automotive industry can be divided into four types of companies: local brand producers, foreign OEMs, joint ventures and Russian companies producing foreign brands. In 2008, there were 5,445 companies manufacturing vehicles and related equipment in Russia. The volume of production and sales amounted to 1,513 billion rubles.

Cars with diesel engines are not popular in Russia, accounting for just 7.6% of all sales as of 2015, compared to half of the market in much of Western Europe. There are 145,000 natural gas vehicles in Russia as of 2016, or 0.3% of all vehicles in the country. The sale of leaded gasoline was outlawed in 2003.

=== Domestic car brands ===
The four most popular cars in Russia in 2009 were all AvtoVAZ models. The economy car Lada Priora topped the list with 84,779 sold units. Lada Samara was second with 77,679 units sold in Russia, and the classic Lada 2105/2107 was third with sales of 57,499. Lada 2105 was expected to considerably increase sales following the car scrappage scheme launched in March 2010. The higher-end Lada Kalina was the fourth most sold car in Russia in 2009, selling 52,499 units that year.

In the light commercial vehicle sector, the GAZelle van, manufactured by GAZ has been very popular, occupying a market share of 49% in 2009 and selling 42,400 units. The Avtoperevozchik magazine declared GAZelle as the most successful vehicle of 2009 in the Russian automotive market.

The largest company of Russia's automotive industry is Avtovaz, located in the city of Tolyatti. It currently employs more than 130,000 people, and its Lada models dominate the Russian car market. Avtovaz models account for about 50% of Russia's total car production.

Russian car manufacturing companies are represented by two associations, ASM-Holding (АСМ-холдинг) and the Association of Russian Automakers (Объединением автопроизводителей России).

=== Foreign car brands ===
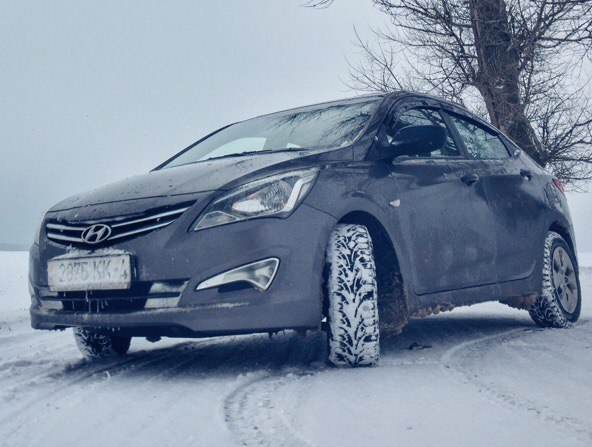
Hyundai Solaris, the first foreign car to top Russian sales chart

Russia's second largest car manufacturer is Avtotor, located in Kaliningrad Oblast. Avtotor performs SKD, CKD or full-cycle assembly of foreign models, such as BMW, Kia, and General Motors's Cadillac and Chevrolet vehicles. In 2009, Avtotor produced 60,000 cars and accounted for 10% of Russian car production.

Avtoframos, the third largest car manufacturer, produced 49,500 cars in 2009. Its plant is located in the south-east part of the city of Moscow. Avtoframos is a joint venture between France's Renault and the Moscow city administration, but is majority owned by Renault. The company manufactures Renault Logan and Renault Sandero models.

Before the international sanctions against Russia, the fourth and fifth largest carmakers in Russia were Volkswagen and Ford, respectively. In total, the five largest companies of the industry account for 80% of all cars made in Russia. In 2016, Hyundai Solaris became the first foreign-branded car to be the best-selling vehicle in the country since sales statistics began in 1970 ending 45 years of Lada domination.

In 2019 Chinese automaker Great Wall Motors started production of Haval F7 vehicles at a plant in the Tula region of central Russia with a manufacturing capacity of 80,000 cars a year.

=== Commercial and heavy vehicles ===
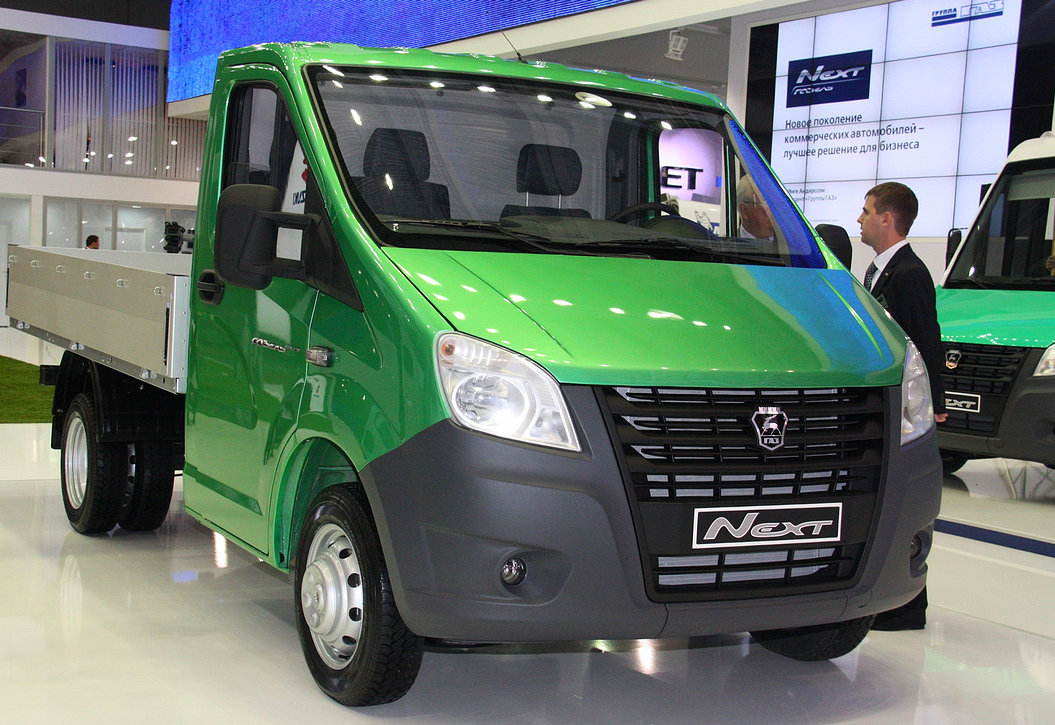
The GAZelle NEXT van, produced by GAZ, is popular on the light commercial vehicle market

In the heavy vehicle sector, the largest company is the truckmaker Kamaz. It is also one of the largest companies in the whole Russian automotive industry. In 2010, Kamaz sold a total of 32,293 trucks; 28,254 in Russia and 4,039 in foreign countries.

Another very important company is GAZ, which makes vans, trucks and busses, among other products. Its most popular product is the GAZelle van, which has a market share of 49% in the light commercial vehicle market. In 2009, the company launched an improved version, called GAZelle Business.

In the bus sector, the GAZ Group Bus Division occupied a market share of 77%. In 2009 it sold 6,169 buses in the small-class, 1,806 in the medium class and 1,156 in the large class.

Russia's largest tractor maker, and one of the largest machine building companies in the world, is Concern Tractor Plants, located in Cheboksary. The company employs around 45,000 people.

=== Short-lived projects ===
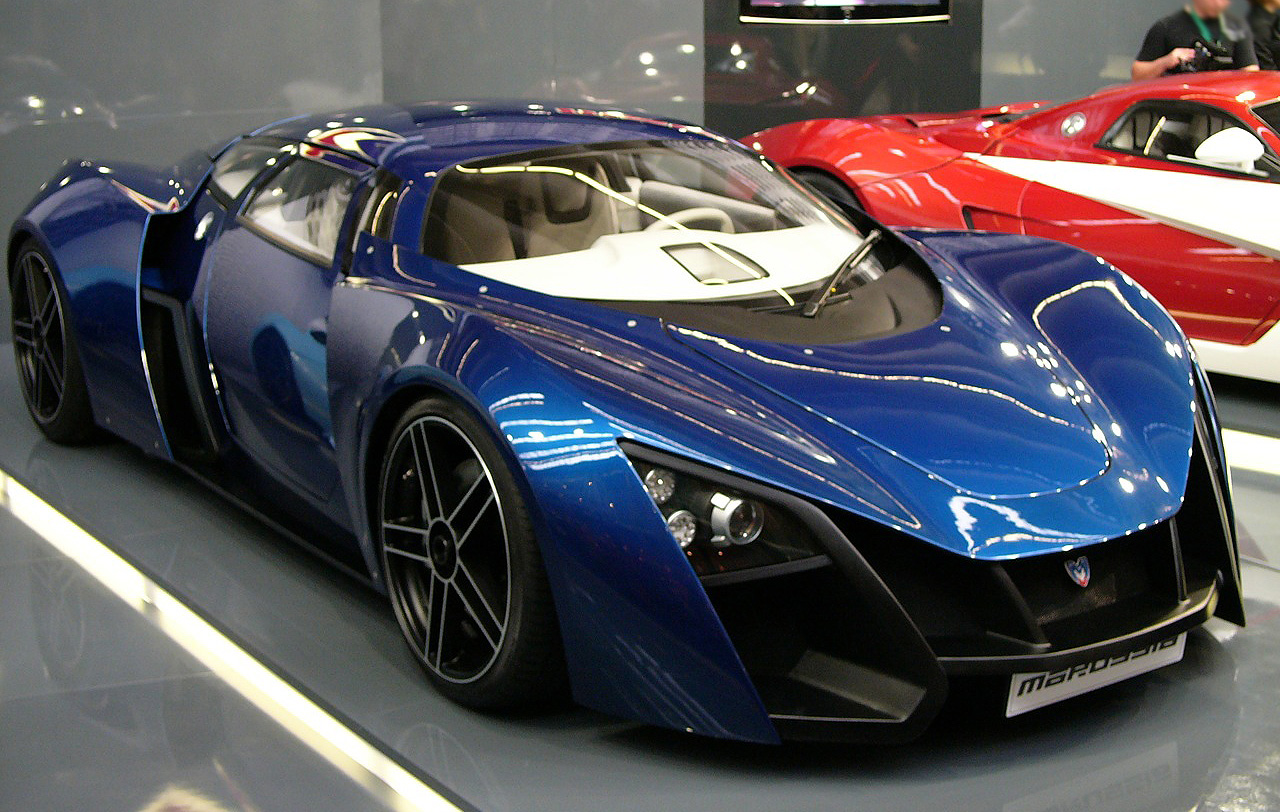
Marussia B2

The Marussia brand, produced by Marussia Motors, became the first modern sports car and the first supercar produced in Russia. The Marussia B1 was launched on 16 December 2008 in the New Manezh Hall in Moscow. On 10 September 2010 the first Marussia Motors show room opened in Moscow. Marussia Motors was led by Nikolay Fomenko, a notable Russian showman, singer, actor and racer. His company acquired a 'significant stake' in the Virgin Racing Formula One team, which was renamed Marussia Virgin Racing from 2011. This team is to become the first ever Russian-owned team in Formula One. Marussia Motors declared bankruptcy and ceased both support for their F1 team and overall trading in 2014.

Another short-lived project was the Yo-mobile, a city car that could burn both gasoline and natural gas and was connected to a pair of electric motors. The car was introduced on 13 December 2010 in Moscow, a product of a joint venture between Yarovit, itself a short lived producer of heavy trucks based in St. Petersburg, Russia, and the Onexim investment group, headed by Mikhail Prokhorov, who was the leader and financier of the project. In 2014 the entire project was sold to the Russian government for a nominal sum, thus signalling the abandonment of the idea. No actual vehicles other than a few concept cars were ever produced.

== Economic and political significance ==
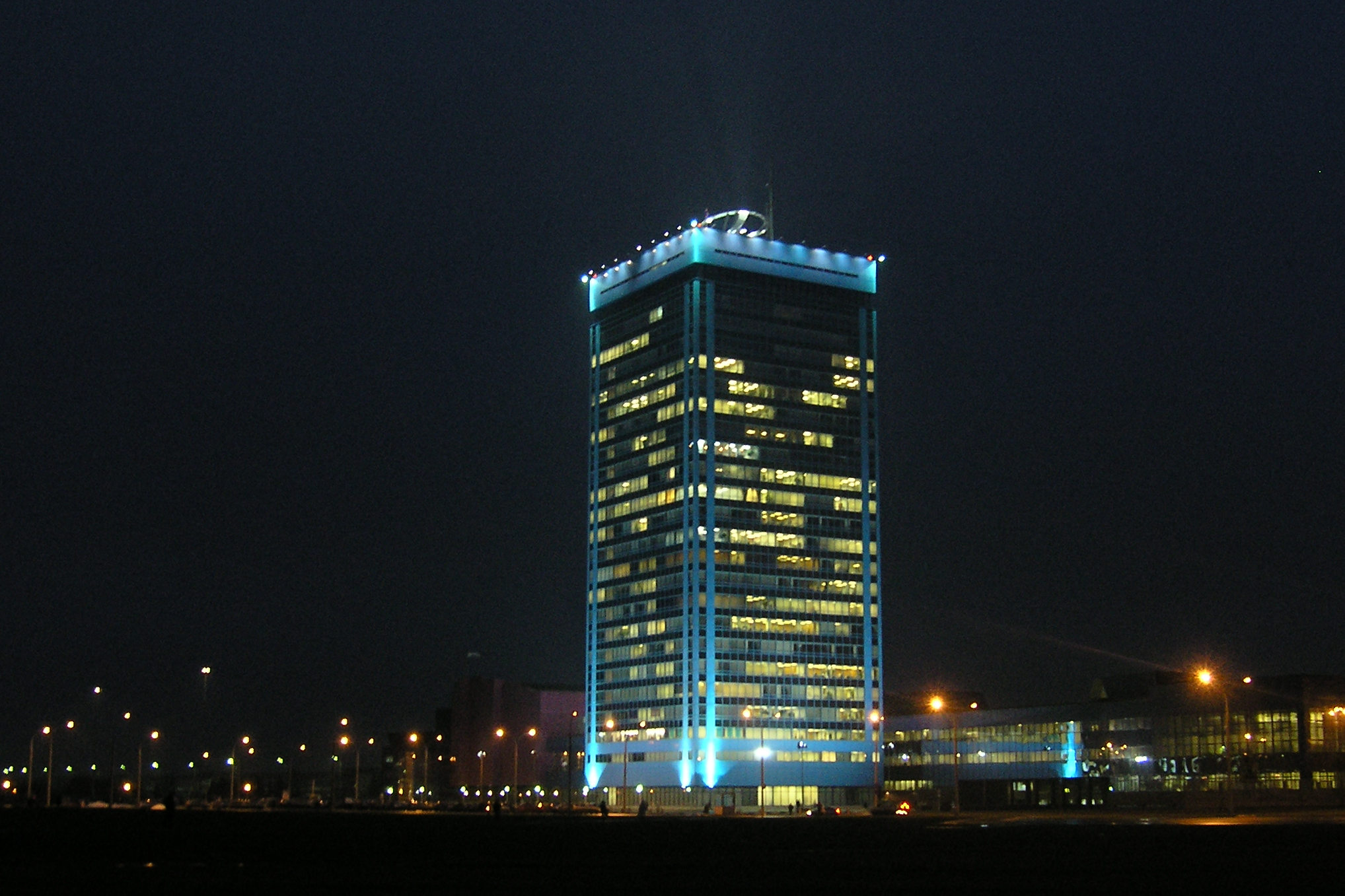
The main administration building of Avtovaz in Togliatti

Russia's automotive industry is a significant economic sector. It directly employs 600,000 people and supports around 2–3 million people in related industries. It is politically a very important part of the country's economy: firstly, due to the large number of employed people and secondly, because many citizens depend on the social services provided by automotive companies. For example, the well-being of the giant AvtoVAZ factory in Tolyatti is massively important to the city or to the region of Samara Oblast. Tolyatti is a typical monotown, a city whose economy is dependent on a single company. The factory employed around 100,000 people of the city's population of 700,000 in 2009.

In 2009, former President Dmitry Medvedev launched the Medvedev modernisation programme, which aims to diversify Russia's raw materials and energy-dominated economy, turning it into a modern high-tech economy based on innovation. Following this, Russia's automotive industry has been in the spotlight due to its great potential for modernisation.

Former Prime Minister and current President Vladimir Putin has taken a personal interest in the automotive industry. In a symbolic gesture of support, Putin made a highly publicized road trip on the new Amur Highway in August 2010, driving 2,165 kilometers in a Lada Kalina Sport. The event was intended to show support for AvtoVAZ, which was recovering from the serious economic crisis.

== Sales statistics ==
Russian car sales statistics from 1999 to 2022, with locally assembled cars in yellow (foreign brands) and blue (Russian brands)

=== Top brands ===
Rank	Brand	Origin	Sales (2025)	Market share (2025)
1	Lada	Russia	329,890	24.8%
2	Haval	China	173,302	13.1%
3	Chery	China	99,810	7.5%
4	Geely	China	94,047	7.1%
5	BelGee	Belarus	68,064	5.1%
6	Changan	China	66,242	5.0%
7	Jetour	China	36,472	2.8%
8	Solaris	Russia	34,519	2.6%
9	Tenet	Russia	33,484	2.5%
10	Toyota	Japan	29,144	2.2%
Others				27.3%

=== Top models ===
Rank	Model	Brand	Origin	Sales
1	Lada Granta	Lada	Russia	146,990
2	Lada Vesta	Lada	Russia	79,796
3	Haval Jolion	Haval	China	65,757
4	BelGee X50	BelGee	Belarus	38,304
5	Geely Monjaro	Geely	China	37,660
6	Haval M6	Haval	China	36,093
7	Lada Niva Legend	Lada	Russia	34,310
8	Lada Niva Travel	Lada	Russia	34,076
9	Changan Uni-S	Changan	China	30,600
10	Lada Largus	Lada	Russia	27,738

=== Best-selling model by year ===
- 2008: Lada 2105/2107
- 2009: Lada Priora
- 2010: Lada 2105/2107
- 2011: Lada Kalina
- 2012: Lada Priora
- 2013: Lada Granta
- 2014: Lada Granta
- 2015: Lada Granta
- 2016: Hyundai Solaris
- 2017: Kia Rio
- 2018: Lada Vesta

== Factories ==
=== Saint Petersburg and Leningrad Oblast ===
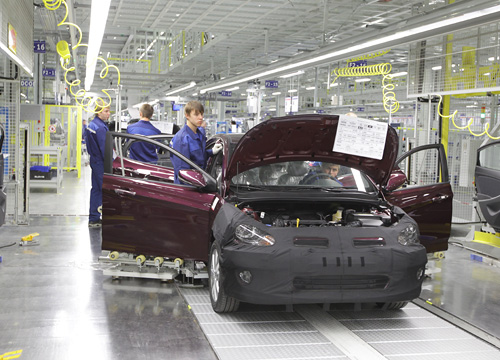
The Hyundai plant in Saint Petersburg

- Hyundai: Hyundai Motor Manufacturing Rus was established in 2010, produced over 200,000 vehicles in 2016. As of 2016 the plant is the second largest in Russia, and employs 2,200 workers.
- Nissan: started production in June 2009, produced 33,600 vehicles in 2015.
- Toyota: manufactured 39,000 vehicles in 2016. Toyota Motor Manufacturing Russia (TMMR), 224-ha factory in Shushary laid down in 2005 and launched production on 21 December 2007. In 2007 it produced 20,000 2.4L and 3.5L Toyota Camry vehicles per year.
- General Motors: opened in July 2008, closed in 2015.
- Scania AB, truck plant Scania-Piter, established in 2002. Produces Scania P, R, G.
- MAN Truck & Bus truck plant, established in 2013.
- Ford Sollers in Vsevolozhsk: opened in 2002. It was the first foreign-owned car plant to be established in Russia.
- Caterpillar Inc. in Tosno, established in 2000, produces rigid dump trucks.

=== Kaluga ===
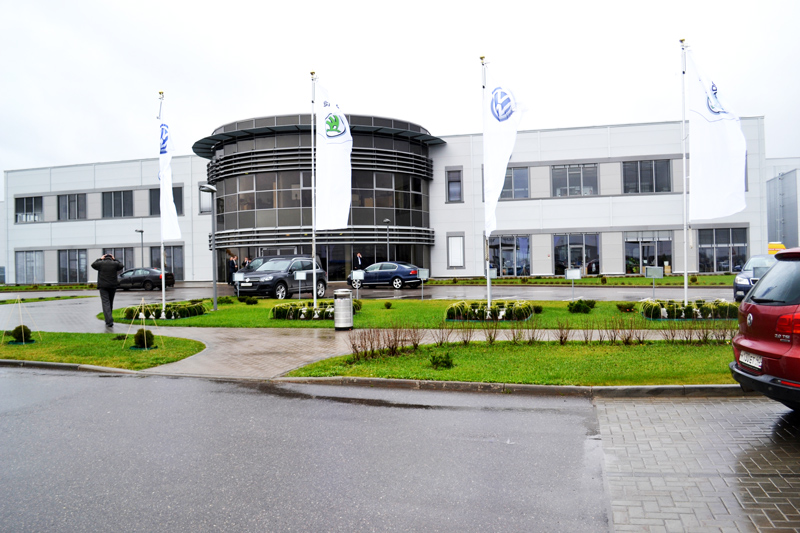
Volkswagen Group Rus in Kaluga

- Volkswagen: started production in November 2007, produced 110,000 cars in 2016. A 200 m^{2} facility with a projected full annual output capacity of 150,000 vehicles, reached during 2010, with employees rising to 3,000. All vehicles produced were initially semi knock downs (SKD), with full production planned to start 2010. Served by Grabtsevo Airport, part of Volkswagen Group Russia (OOO Volkswagen Rus).
- Peugeot Citroen Mitsubishi Automotive: opened in April 2010, produced 25,733 vehicles in 2015.
- Volvo Vostok truck plant in Kaluga, established in 2009. Produces Volvo FH, Volvo FMX, Volvo FM, Renault Premium, Renault Kerax.

=== Volga Federal District ===
- Nizhny Novgorod - GAZ, produced 41,691 vehicles in 2015. The plant also produces Volkswagen and Skoda vehicles due to a partnership between Volkswagen Group Rus and GAZ Group.
- Tolyatti
  - AvtoVAZ, produced 356,602 vehicles in 2015.
  - GM-AvtoVAZ, produced 34,218 vehicles in 2015.
- Izhevsk: IzhAvto (Nissan), produced 72,884 vehicles in 2015.
- Naberezhnye Chelny: Sollers - Naberezhnye Chelny, produced 10,000 vehicles in 2015.
- Yelabuga: Ford Sollers, produced 10,300 vehicles in 2015.
- Naberezhnye Chelny: Kamaz truck plant, also produces Mercedes-Benz trucks under a joint venture established in 2010. Produces Mercedes-Benz Axor, Mercedes-Benz Actros, Mercedes-Benz Unimog.
- Syzran: JBC truck plant, established in 2014 on the production facilities of the former RosLada plant. Produces JBC SY1041, JBC SY1060.

=== Moscow and Moscow Oblast ===
- Esipovo, Moscow Oblast: Mercedes-Benz plant under construction.
- Khimki: Hino Motors Russia factory, opened in 2017 and started manufacturing trucks in 2019.
- Moscow: Renault Russia, produced 73,633 vehicles in 2015.

=== Rest of Russia ===
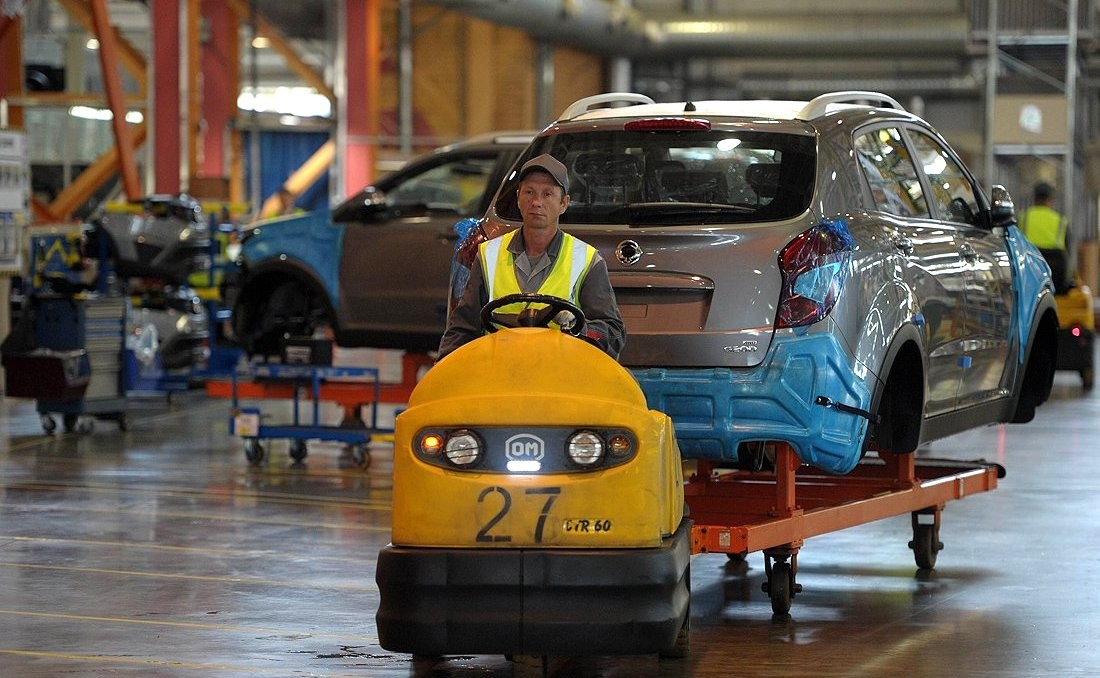
Sollers JSC plant in Vladivostok

- Kaliningrad: Avtotor (Kia, Hyundai, BMW), produced 92,200 vehicles in 2015.
- Vladivostok: Sollers JSC (Toyota, Mazda, Ssangyong, Isuzu), produced 31,823 vehicles in 2015.
- Cherkessk - Derways (Lifan, Geely, Great Wall Hover, Chery), produced 24,800 cars in 2014.
- Argun: ChechenAvto - produced 6,700 cars in 2016.
- Yaroslavl, Komatsu Limited established in 2010, produces rigid dump trucks.
- Miass, Iveco truck plant (Iveco AMT, former joint venture Iveco-UralAZ) established in 1994. Produces Iveco Trakker, Iveco Stralis.
- Uzlovaya: Great Wall Motors plant under construction.
- Lipetsk: Lifan plant under construction.

== Manufacturers of automobile engines ==
- AvtoVAZ, based in Togliatti and established in 1966. Manufactures gasoline engines for passenger cars under the Lada brand.
- Cummins Kama, based in Naberezhnye Chelny and established in 2006 as a joint venture between Cummins and Kamaz. Manufactures diesel engines for trucks under the Kamaz brand.
- Ford Sollers, engine plant established in 2015.
- Kamaz, based in Naberezhnye Chelny and established in 1969. Manufactures diesel engines for heavy-duty trucks and large buses under the brands KAMAZ, NefAZ, and also for the BTR-80.
- Tutaev Motor Plant (TMZ), based in Tutaev and established in 1969. Manufactures diesel engines for heavy trucks under the brands MZKT (MZKT-742910), BAZ.
- Ulyanovsk Motor Plant (UMZ), based in Ulyanovsk and established in 1944, part of the GAZ Group. Manufactures gasoline and gasoline-gas engines for light commercial vehicles and SUVs under the brands GAZ (GAZ Gazelle, GAZ Sobol), UAZ (UAZ-3151 military performance).
- Volkswagen Group Rus, plant in Kaluga producing 1.6 MPI engines.
- Yaroslavl Motor Plant (YaMZ), based in Yaroslavl and established in 1916 (as Autoworks), 1958 (conversion to the production of engines), part of the GAZ Group. Manufactures diesel engines for trucks, small buses, large buses, armored vehicles, armored personnel carriers under the brands PAZ (PAZ-3205, PAZ-4234), LiAZ (LiAZ-5256), BTR-80, GAZ Tigr (AMZ Tigr), BAZ, MAZ, KrAZ, MZKT, BelAZ (younger models with BelAZ-7540-7547 to BelAZ-7547), MoAZ (MoAZ-7505).
- Zavolzhye Motor Plant (ZMZ), based in Zavolzhye and established in 1958, owned by UAZ. Manufactures petrol and diesel engines for off-road vehicles, light commercial vehicles and small buses under the brands UAZ, PAZ (PAZ-3203, PAZ-3204, PAZ-3205).
- ZiL, based in Moscow and established in 1916. Manufactures gasoline engines for medium trucks under the brands ZiL (ZiL-4331).

== Gasoline ==
In the Soviet Union there were different grades of automobile gasoline, which had the following names: A-56, A-66, A-70, A-72, A-74, A-76, AI-93, AI-95 also known as "Extra", and B-70 (aviation gasoline). The first letter indicated the vehicle for which the gasoline was intended, the number indicated the octane. Gasolines A-56 and A-66, A-70, and later A-72, were intended for cars with flat-head engines produced in the 1930s-1960s. Gasolines A-74, later A-76 and AI-93 for cars with overhead valve engine produced in the 1960s-1980s. AI-95 gasoline was mainly for foreign cars or government limousines ZIL and Chaika. The letter "I" in the AI-93 and AI-95 brands indicated that the octane number was calculated using the research method. After the dissolution of the Soviet Union in the 1990s, A-76 gasoline was replaced by AI-80, and AI-93 by AI-92. By the early 1980s, production of A-66 gasoline ceased, and about a decade later, so did A-72.

== Gallery ==
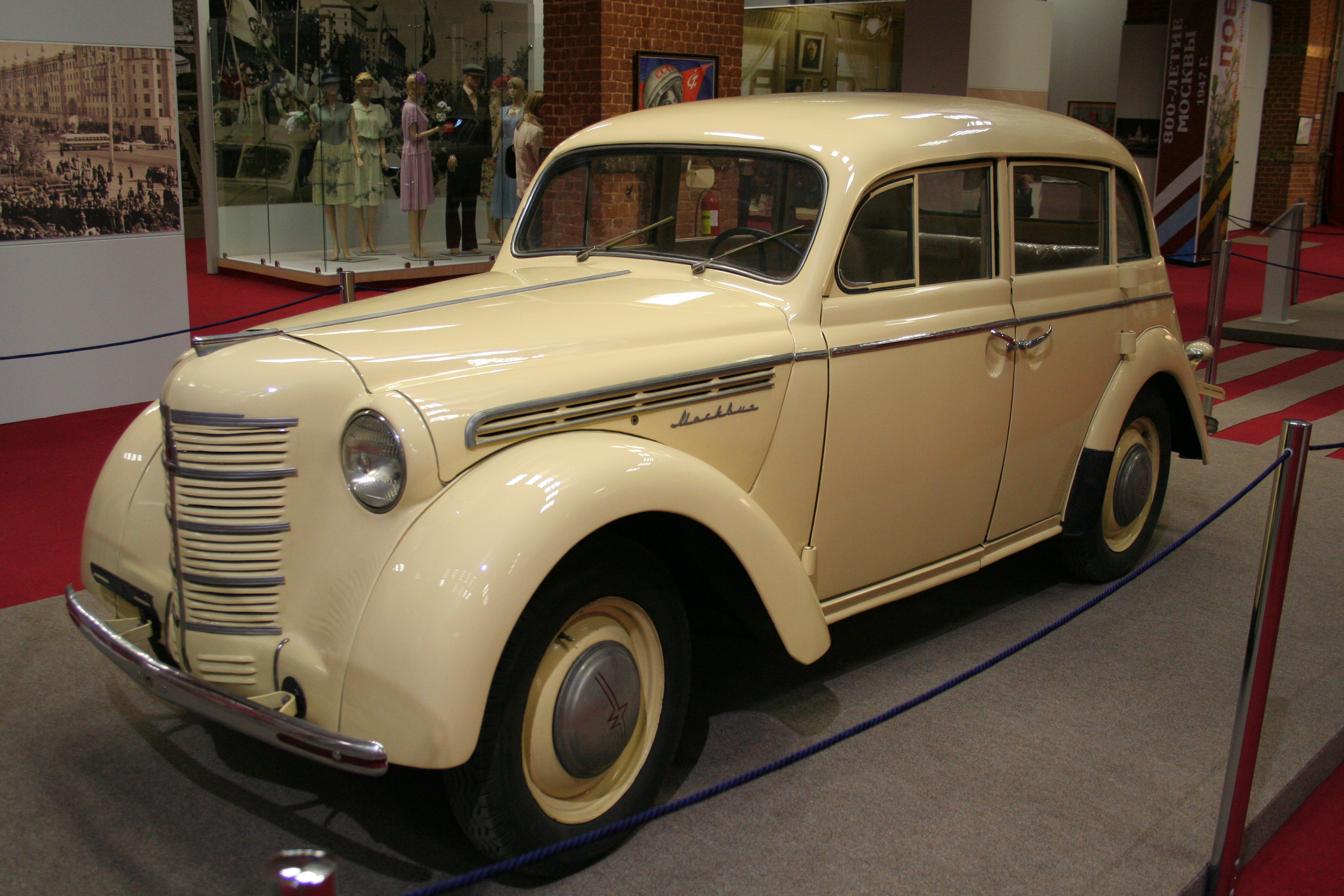
Moskvitch 400

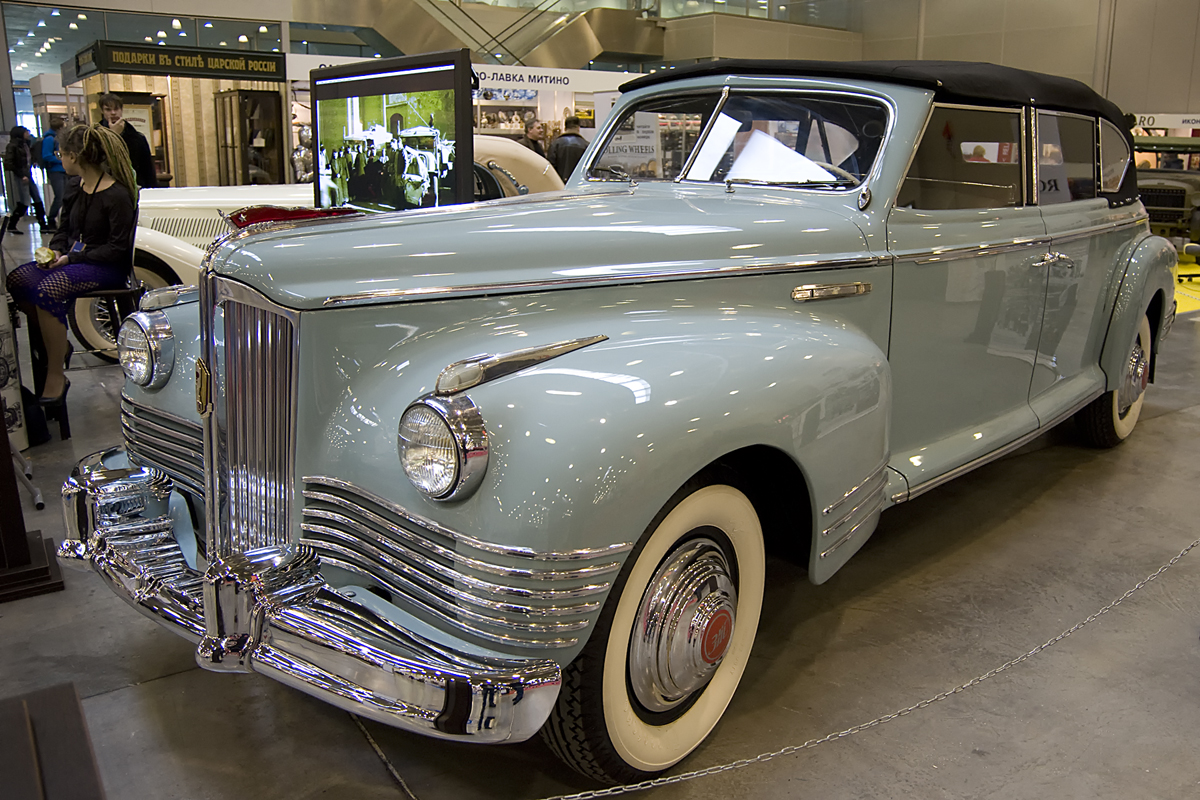
ZIL-110

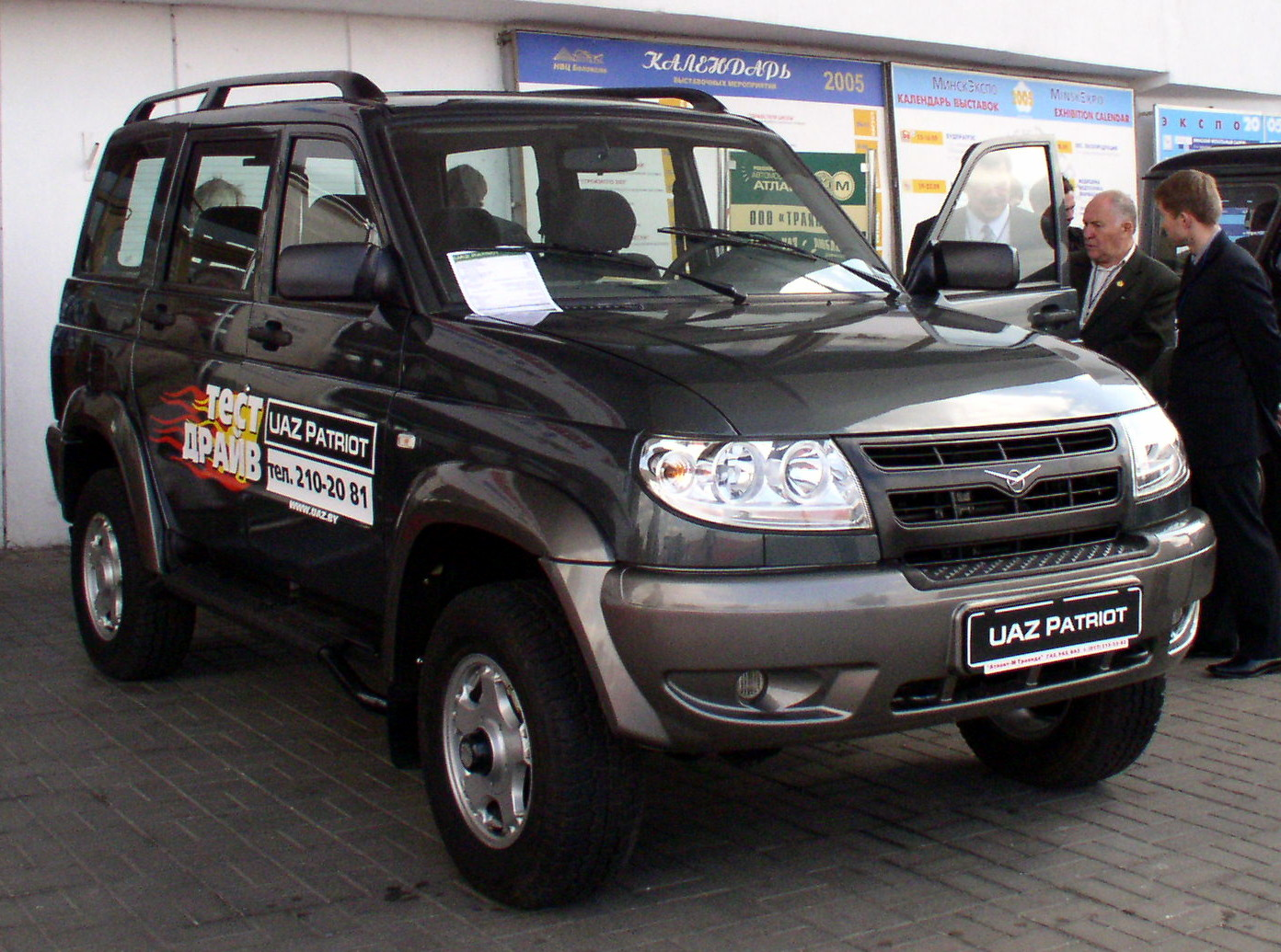
UAZ Patriot

== See also ==
- List of automobile manufacturers of Russia
