= List of automobile manufacturers of Russia =

This is a list of current and defunct automobile manufacturers of Russia.

== Major current manufacturers ==
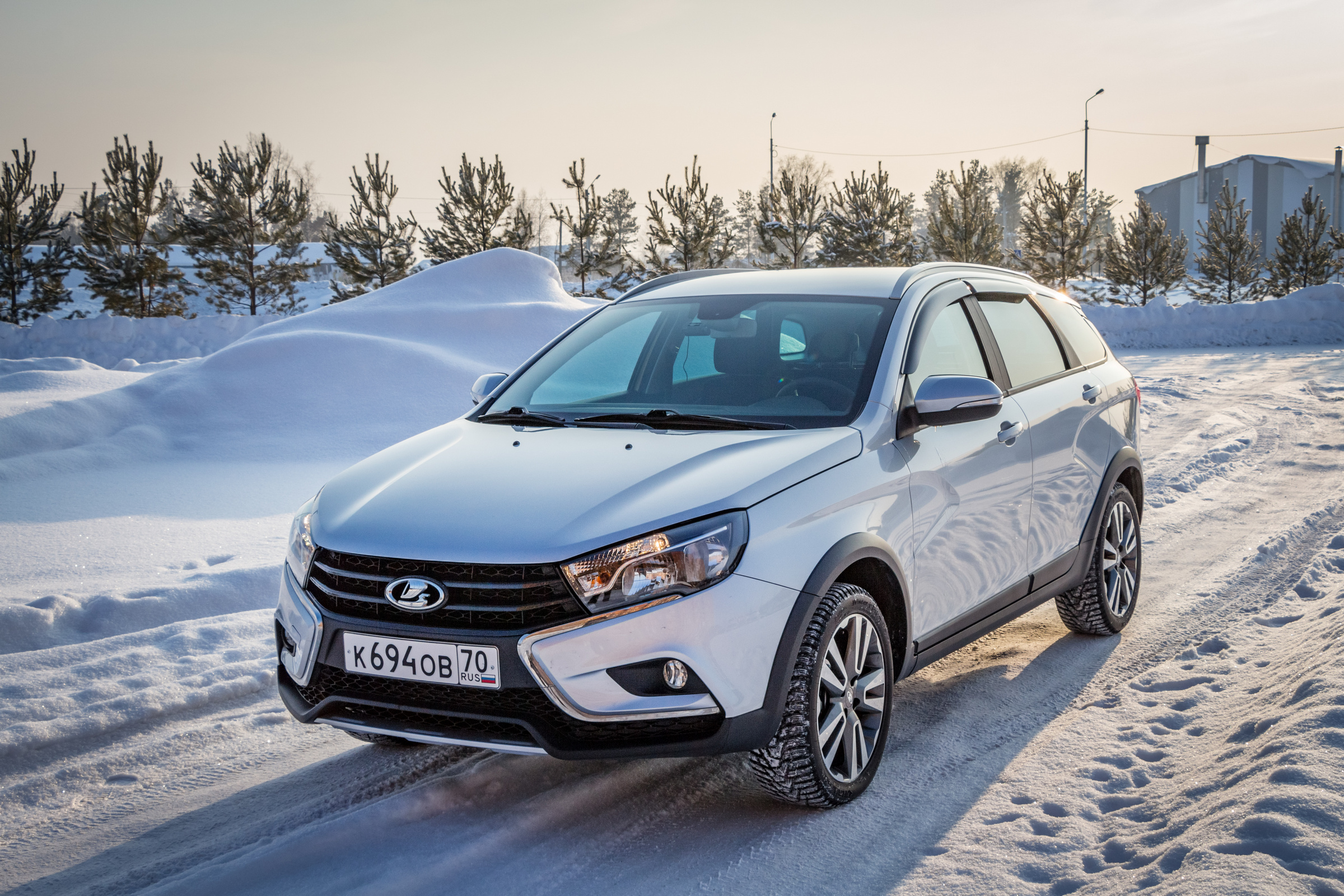
Lada Vesta

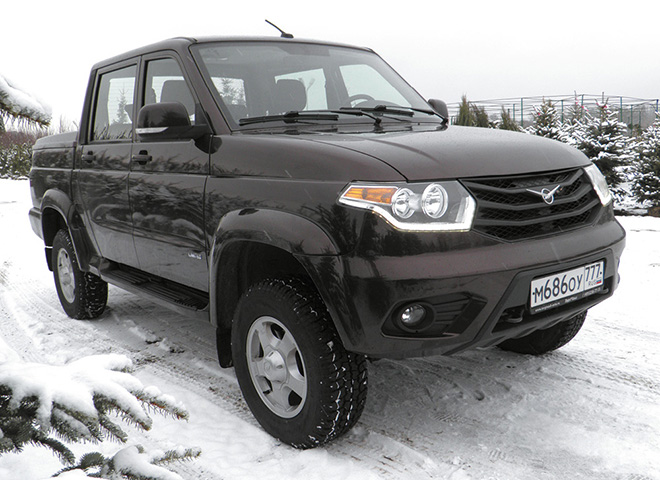
UAZ Patriot Pickup

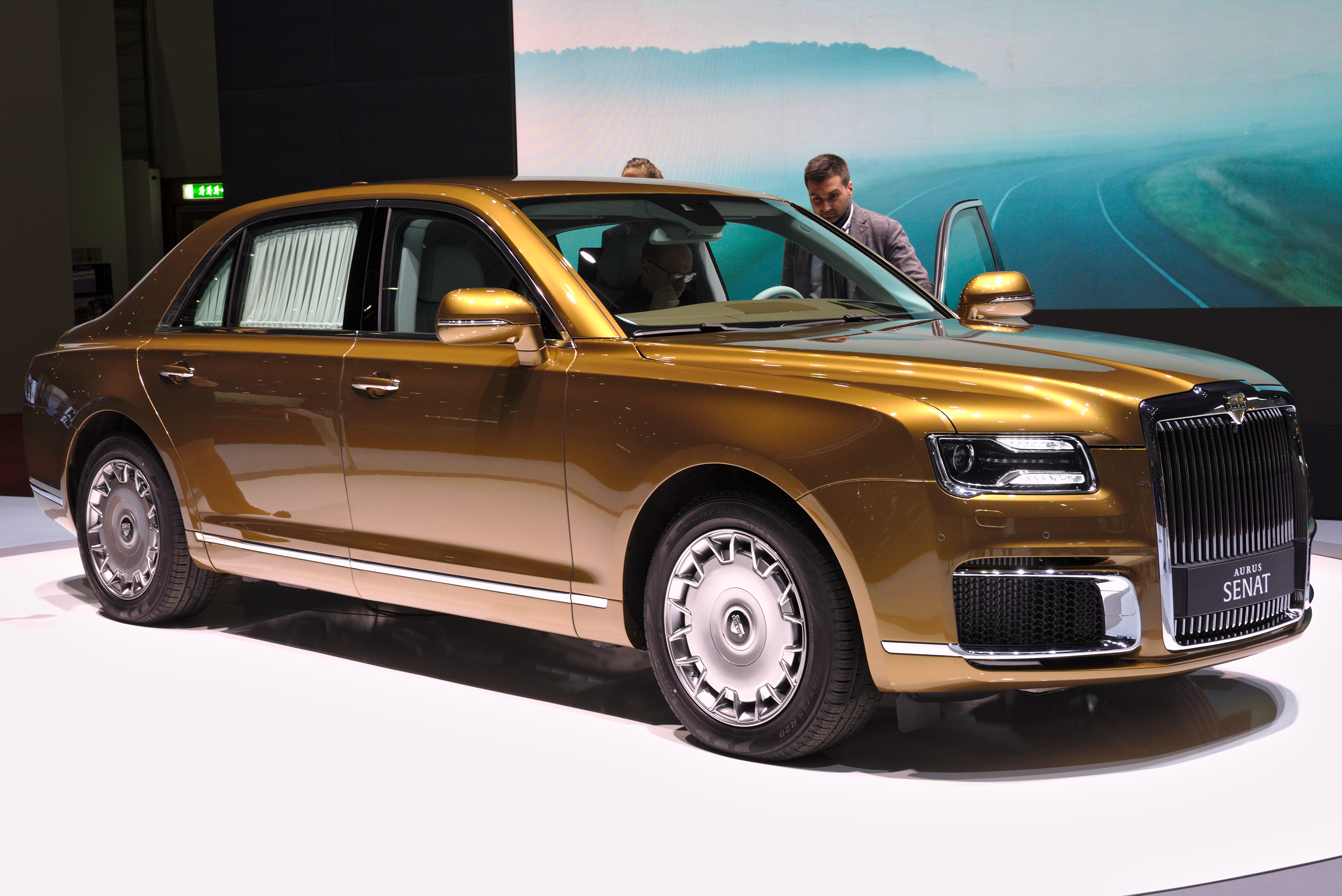
Aurus Senat

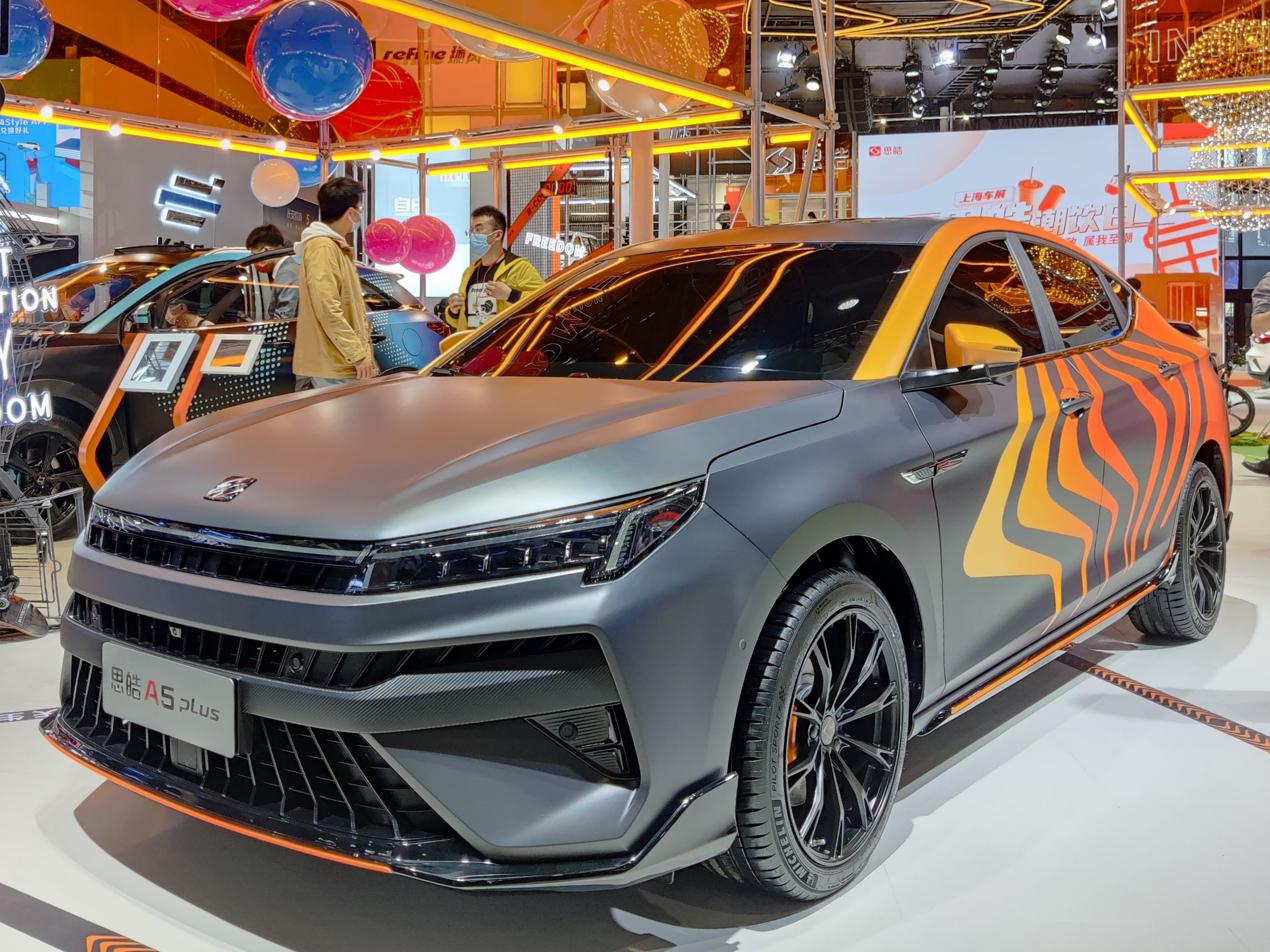
Moskvitch 6

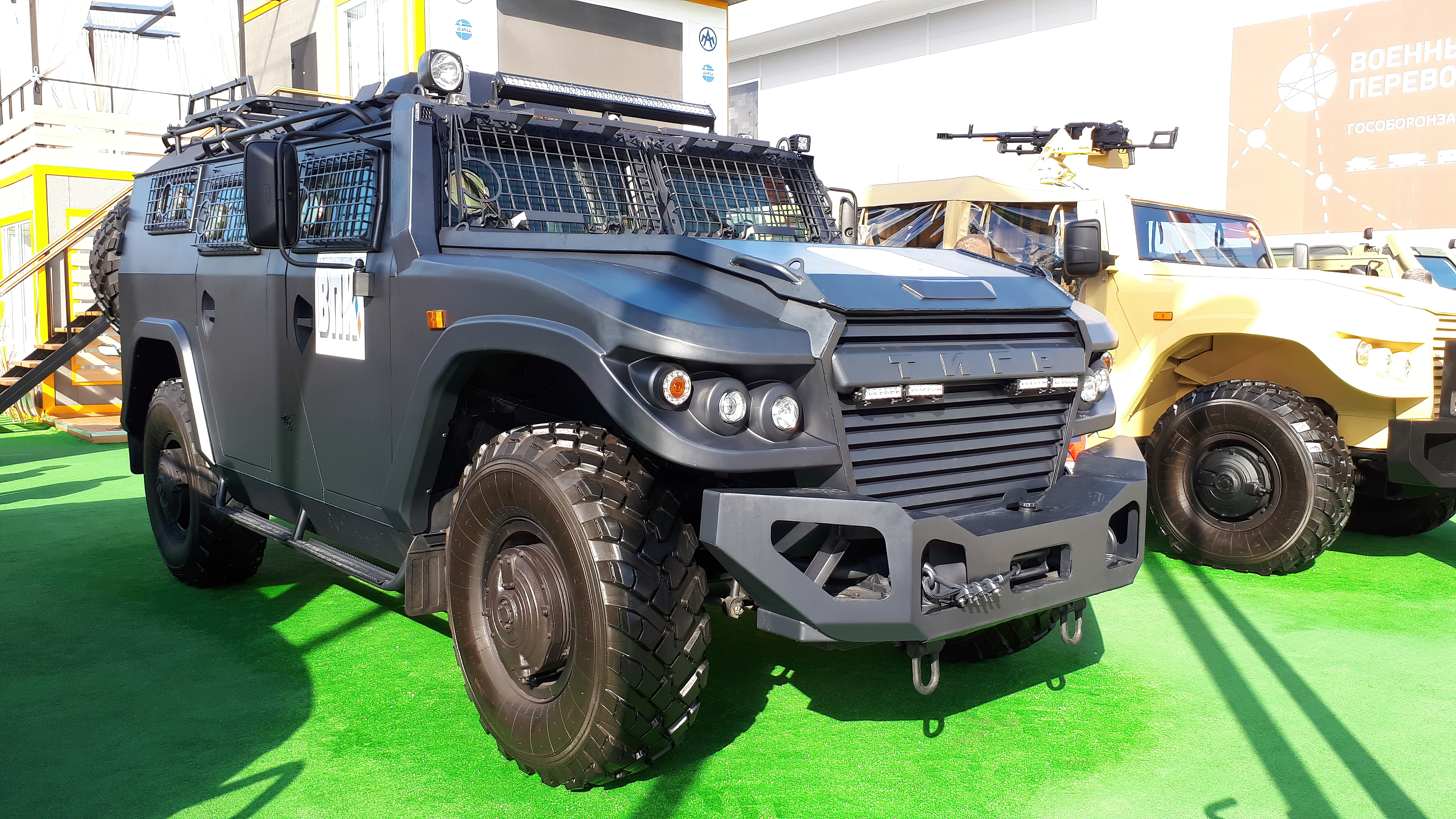
GAZ Tigr

- AvtoVAZ (1966–present)
  - Lada
- GAZ (1932–present)
- Kamaz (1969–present)
- Moskvitch/AZLK (1930–present)
- NAMI (1918–present)
  - Aurus Motors
- UAZ (1941–present)

== Other current manufacturers ==
- Avtotor (1996)
- GM-AvtoVAZ (2001) - part of AvtoVAZ
- Kombat Armouring (1985)
- Silant (2010)
- Sollers JSC (2002)
- SpetsTekh (2006)
- VAZInterService (1991) - part of AvtoVAZ

== Former manufacturers ==
- Aleko (1985)
- Amur (1967-2012)
- Avtokam (1989)
- Doninvest (1997)
- IzhAvto (1965-2008)
- Marussia (2007-2014)
- Russo-Balt (1894-1923/2006)
- SeAZ (1939)
- TagAZ (1997-2014)
- Yarovit Motors (2003-2014)
- Yo-Mobile (2010-2014)
- ZiL (1916–2013)
- ZMA (1985-2010)

== Local automakers ==
Name	Location	Year of foundation	Parent company	Car Types	Produced by the brand and model
PSA Bronto	Togliatti	1993	AvtoVAZ	Collectors cars, ATVs based Lada 4x4,	Bronto
Super Avto	Togliatti	1997		cars	Lada Priora 1.8, VAZ 2329 (Niva pickup)
PSA VIS-Avto	Togliatti	1991	AvtoVAZ	Light commercial vehicle based Lada Granta, Lada Samara and Lada 4x4	VIS-2346, VIS-2347, VIS-2349
United Auto Group (former IZHAvto)	Izhevsk	1965	AvtoVAZ	Cars	Lada Granta, Lada Vesta
GAZ	Nizhny Novgorod	1932	GAZ Group (100%)	Light commercial vehicle, minibuses	GAZ :GAZelle, GAZelle Next, GAZ Sobol, GAZ Valdai, GAZ-3309, GAZ Sadko, GAZon NEXT
UralAZ	Miass	1941	GAZ Group (100%)	Medium and heavy trucks terrain (including the army), road trucks, truck buses	Ural-4320, Ural-5323, Ural-3255, Ural-6370, Ural-6368, Ural-6470
PAZ	Pavlovo	1932	GAZ Group (100%)	small, medium buses, school buses, buses terrain	PAZ-3205, PAZ-3206, PAZ-3204, PAZ-3234, PAZ-3237
KAvZ	Kurgan	1958	GAZ Group (100%)	Medium buses, school buses	KAVZ-4235, KAVZ-4238
LiAZ	Likino-Dulyovo	1937	GAZ Group (100%)	Large city buses, school buses, articulated buses	LiAZ-5256, LiAZ-5292, LiAZ-5293, LiAZ-6212, LiAZ-6213
GOLAZ	Maliye Vyazyomy, Odintsovsky District, Moscow Oblast	1990	GAZ Group (100%)	Intercity buses and coaches	GOLAZ-5251 Voyage, GOLAZ-52911 Cruise, LiAZ-GOLAZ-5256, GOLAZ-6228 Voyage L
NefAZ	Neftekamsk	1972	Kamaz (50,02%), Republic of Bashkortostan (28,5%)	trailers, dump trucks KAMAZ, large buses and coaches	KAMAZ, NefAZ-5299, VDL-NefAZ-5299
Kamaz- Marko	Neftekamsk	2012	joint venture Kamaz and Marcopolo S.A.	small buses	Bravis
UAZ	Ulyanovsk	1941	Sollers JSC (80%)	SUV, Light commercial vehicle	UAZ Hunter, UAZ Patriot, UAZ-2206/3303/3909/3962
Sollers-Dalniy Vostok	Vladivostok	2009	Sollers JSC	Cars	SsangYong :SsangYong Actyon, SsangYong Actyon Sports, SsangYong Kyron, SsangYong Rexton,
ZiL	Moscow, Petrovsk	1916-2013	Executive of Moscow	Medium and heavy trucks, small buses, fire trucks	ZIL-4333, ZIL-4331, ZIL-4329, ZIL-5301, ZIL-4327, ZIL-3250
BAZ	Bryansk	1958	none	tractors and wheel chassis dual-use (military and civilian), crane chassis	BAZ
Chechen Avto	Argun, Chechen Republic	2008	none	Cars	Lada Priora
IMS	Gzhel, Moscow Oblast	2007	Irito	SUV	Great Wall Hover H3, Great Wall Hover H5
Avtotor	Kaliningrad	1996	none	Cars, Light commercial vehicle	Opel : Opel Astra J (three-door and station wagon), Opel Insignia, Opel Meriva, Opel Zafira Tourer (3rd gen), Opel Mokka, Opel Antara,
Volzhanin	Volzhsky	1993	none	medium, large and articulated buses, intercity buses and coaches	Volgabus Cityrithm, Volgabus Rhytmix, Volgabus Dolphin, Volgabus Delta
BAW RUS Motor Corp.	Ulyanovsk	2008	joint venture AMS Group and BAW	light, medium trucks and small buses	BAW Tonik, BAW Fenix, BAW Street
ST Nizhegorodetz	Nizhny Novgorod	2007	Nizhegorodetz		
PKF Luidor	Nizhny Novgorod	2008	Luidor		
Kuzbassavto	Drachenino, Leninsk-Kuznetsky District, Kemerovo Oblast	2010	MARR TEC		
TagAZ	Taganrog	1998	-	Cars	TagAZ Aquila
Derways	Cherkessk	2003	Mercury (49%), Sberbank of Russia (51%)	Cars	Lifan: Lifan Smily, Lifan Solano, Lifan 520, Lifan X60, Geely :GEELY MK, Geely Emgrand EC7, Brilliance :Brilliance V5, Chery: Chery Bonus 3, Chery Tiggo 5, Jianghuai Automobile :JAC S1, JAC S5 Hawtai: Hawtai Boliger

== See also ==
- List of automobile manufacturers
- List of automobile marques
- List of motorcycle manufacturers
- List of truck manufacturers
