= Hyundai Motor Manufacturing Rus =

- Type: Subsidiary
- Industry: Automotive
- Founded: 29 February 2008
- Defunct: 27 September 2023
- Headquarters: Sestroretsk, Russia
- Parent: Hyundai Motor Company
- Website: www.hyundai.ru

OOO Hyundai Motor Manufacturing Rus was an automobile manufacturer based in Sestroretsk, Russia. The company was an wholly owned subsidiary of the South Korean Hyundai Motor Company and is considered to be the first full-fledged automobile plant of a foreign automobile plant in the Russian Federation.

== History ==
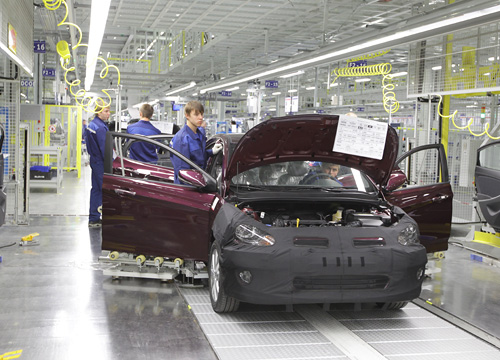
Pre-production of the Solaris in 2010

Hyundai Motor Manufacturing Rus was established on 29 February 2008 and the foundation stone was laid on 5 June.

The press shop was able to start the test run on 19 May 2010. On the occasion of the test run, a small opening ceremony was held among the workforce. A short time later, the pre-production of the new Solaris began, a model that is located as a hatchback in the small car segment and as a sedan in the compact class. The design of the model comes from the Fluidic Sculpture concept study. The engines used come from the Gamma series. The first presentation of the Solaris models took place in August 2010 at the Moscow International Automobile Salon.

Series production finally started with an annual capacity reduced to 105,000 units. With the introduction of the 5-door, the capacity increased to 150,000 units. At full capacity, up to 200,000 automobiles can be produced per year.

In December 2020, Hyundai has completed the acquisition of a decommissioned General Motors manufacturing plant in Shushary, Saint Petersburg, making it the second plant for HMMR.

In September 2021, the Hyundai WIA division opened a car engine manufacturing plant in Saint Petersburg, the biggest in Russia and the fifth in the world. The new plant is designed to produce about 330,000 engines for Hyundai Solaris and Creta as well as for Kia Rio by the end of the year 2021. The construction of the plant began in December 2019.

On 24 February 2022, Russian troops have begun a large scale invasion of Ukraine. Russia escalated the war that it had begun im March 2014 by annexiating Crimea. Most Western world carmakers suspended production. Russia made it difficult to extract funds and urged the carmakers to sell their plants for a nominal fee.

On 27 September 2023, Hyundai sold the Saint Petersburg factory to AGR Automotive, a subsidiary of Russian company Art-Finans. Assembly operations restarted in mid-2024 under the new ownership, using unassembled kits enough to produce around 70,000 vehicles.

On 26 January 2024, Hyundai finalised its Russia exit.

== Production ==
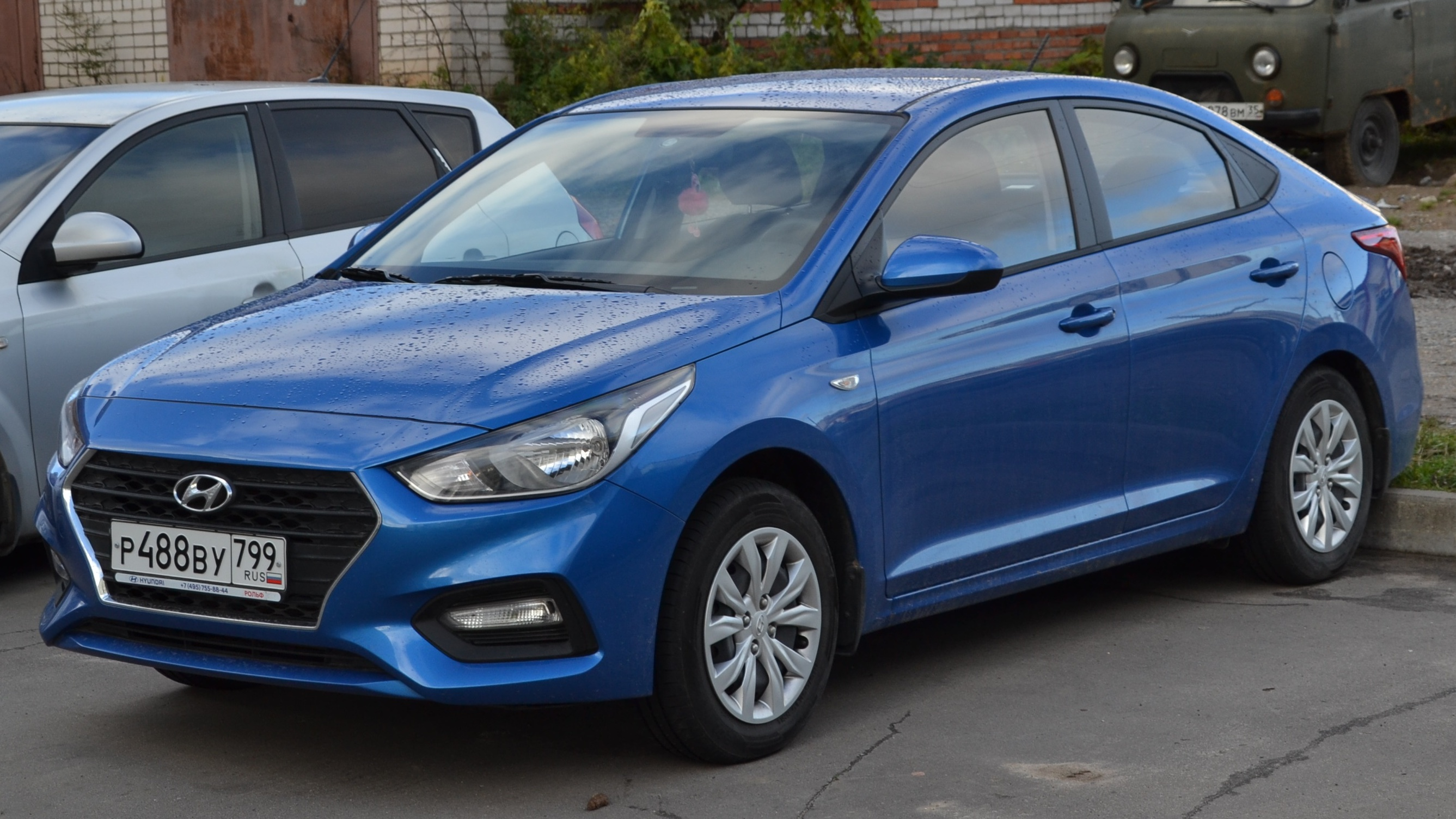
2018 Hyundai Solaris

- Hyundai Solaris (2011–2022)
- Kia Rio (2011–2022)
- Hyundai Creta (2016–2022)

== See also ==
- List of Hyundai Motor Company manufacturing facilities
