= Hippolyte Romanov =

Hippolyte Vladimirovich Romanov
- Ипполит Владимирович Романов
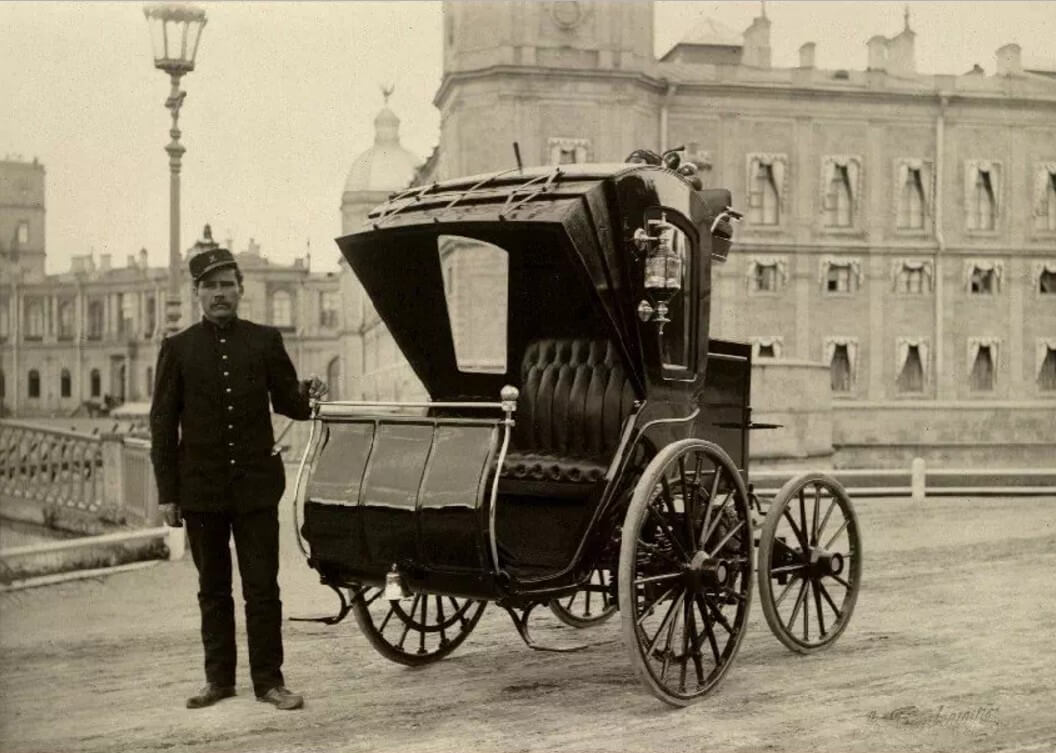
- Born: January 25, 1864; Tiflis, Russian Empire, today Tbilisi, Georgia
- Died: January 1, 1944 (aged 79); New York City, New York, United States

Hippolyte Vladimirovich Romanov (also spelt Hippolyte Romanoff; Russian: Ипполит Владимирович Романов; 1864–1944) was a Russian engineer and inventor, whose work was closely associated with electric vehicles. He designed the first domestic electric car that was built in Saint Petersburg, 1899.

This vehicle was designed to carry two people and became famous under the name "cuckoo."

It has 750 kg weight, of which 370 kg held battery. Capacity of fully charged battery was enough for about 60 km way at a speed of 35 versts per hour (about 39 km/h).

He also built an omnibus car carrying 17 people at a speed of 20 km/h over a distance of 60 km.

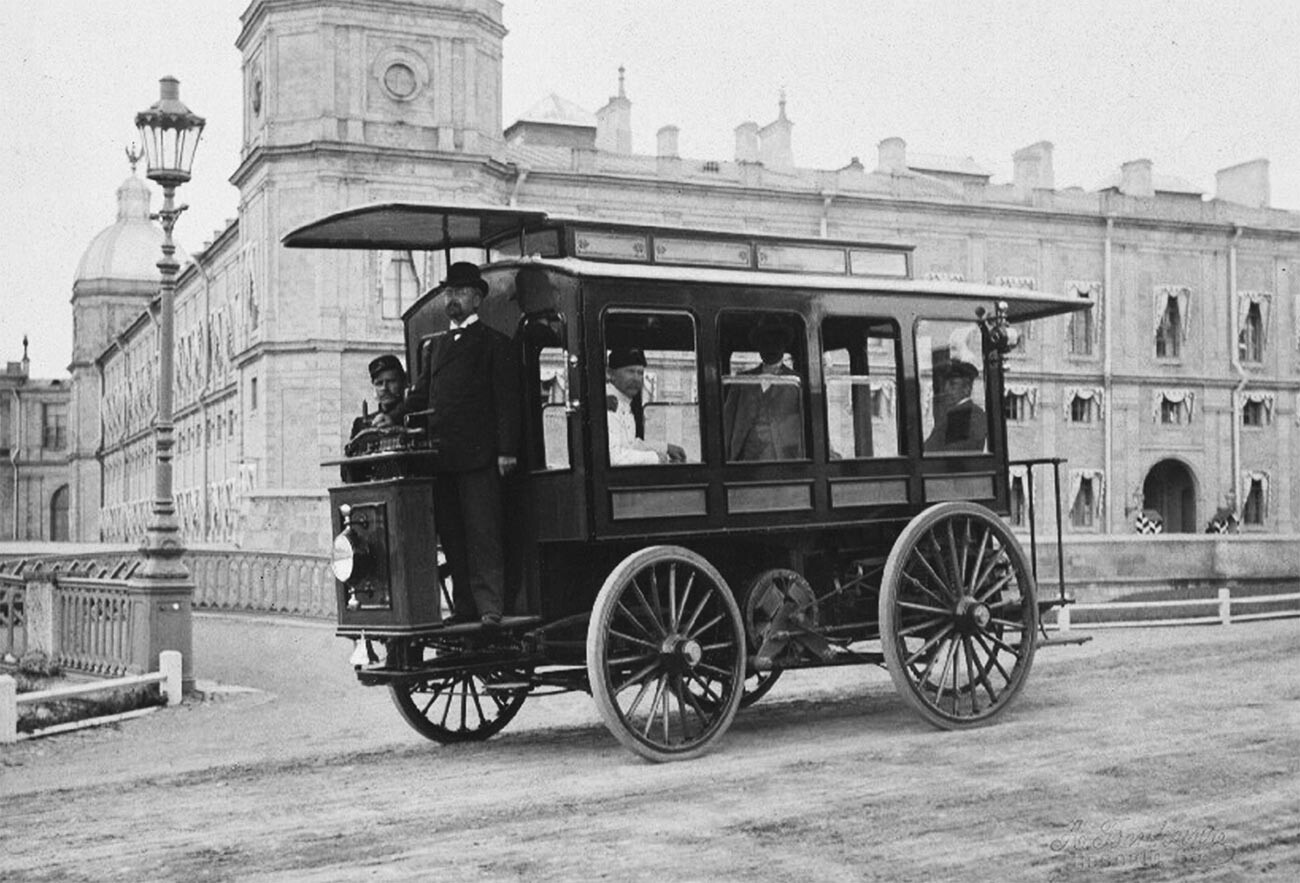
First electric omnibus by Hyppolyte Romanov in Gatchina

His 20-seater electric omnibus designed for hotels was built in the "Dux" factory in Moscow in 1902 . Its design featured running gear steel tire.

However, the development of electric transport in the country needed support from the state.

On January 19, 1901 Romanov was asked by St. Petersburg City Duma to open 10 routes. This required 80 omnibuses, which need totalling funds of more than 500,000 rubles. To find such huge amounts of money, it was decided to establish a joint stock company, which failed, because its direct competitors (different omnibus and tram companies) were clearly unhappy with the new form of transport.

As the result all Romanov's efforts to establish regular traffic of electric buses failed. Seeing that his ideas were not popular, Romanov transferred to work in other areas of electrical engineering.

He built eight electrical vehicles: 4 trucks, 1 three-cycled van and 3 private passenger cars by mid-1914, according to the magazine "Motorist". Trying to assess the prospects for the spread of electric cars in Russia, magazine wrote:

... Meanwhile, electric cars could be very helpful ... We just beware of one-sided relationship to the electrical crews and apply them only where they really stand on their products internationally in its place. Not competition and practice will show what area of movement should be Applicability gasoline cars, and to what extent - electric ...
