= Spetsteh =

Spetsteh LLC, (Russian: ООО "Спецтех") based in Nizhny Novgorod, is a Russian manufacturer and marketer of specialized tracked and wheeled all terrain vehicles. Its vehicles are operated by companies and oil and gas companies, geologists, energy, hunters, herders, search and rescue services.

== Models ==
=== Tracked two-part ATVs ===
- ТТС-3404-ПГ Ужгур (PG Uzhgur)
- TTC-3404-ps Uzhgur
- ТТС-3404-3 ГП Ужгур/ GP Uzhgur
- Hagglund BV-206
- ТТМ-4901ГР/GR
- ТТМ-4901ПС/4901PS

=== Tracked ATVs ===
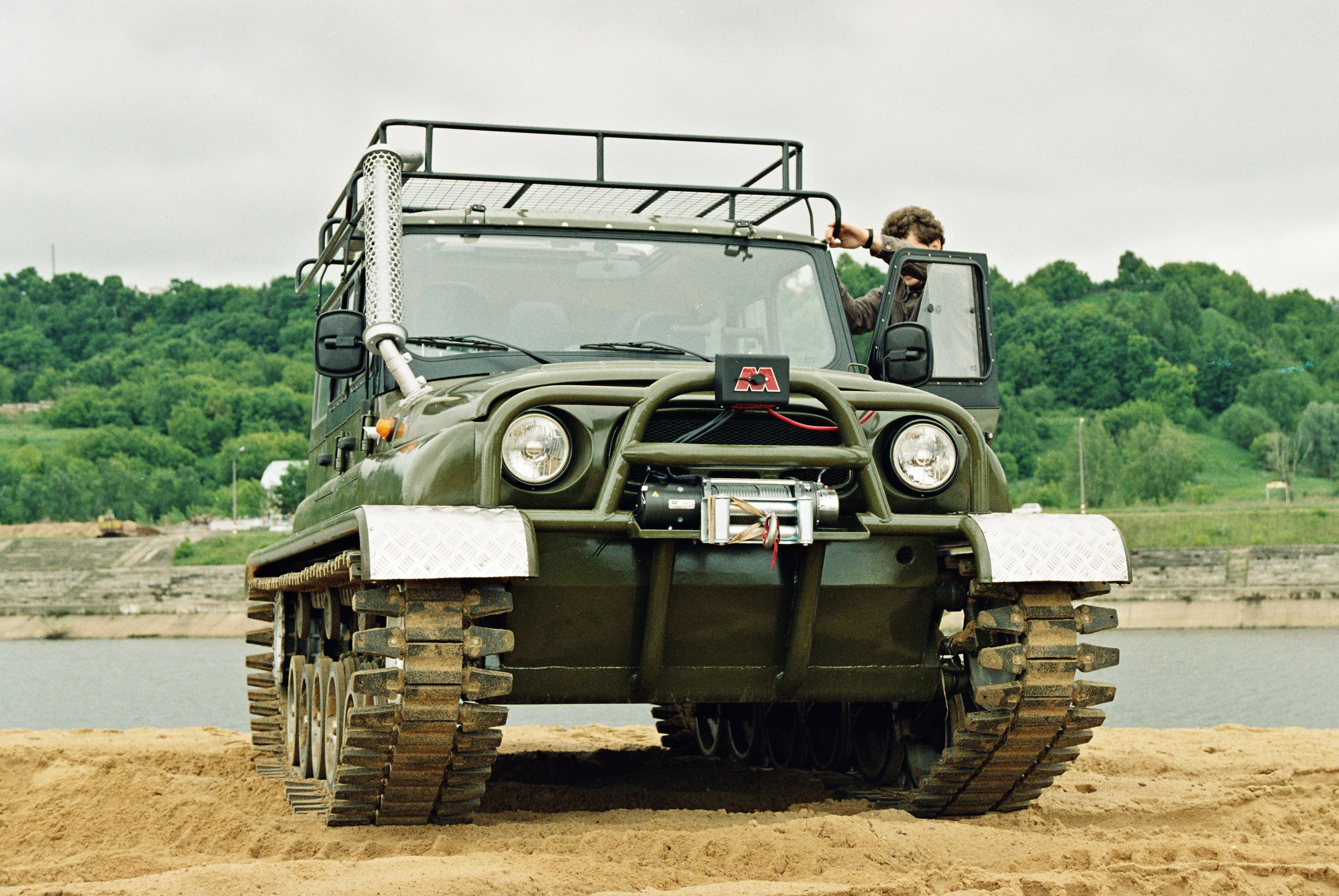
Spetsteh built UAZ Hunter on tracks

- ЗВМ-2410/SBU-2410 Uhtysh
- ЗВМ-2411П/SBU-2411P Uzola
- ЗВМ-2411Г/SBU-2411G Uzola
  - SBU-2411GP
- SBU-2412GP
- ТТМ-3902ГР/TTM 3902GR
- ТТМ-3902ПС/TTM 3902PS
- TTC-34014 Vetluga
- TTC-34015 Vetluga

tracked chassis manufactured by GAZ

- GAZ 34039-12
- GAZ 34039-13
- GAZ 34039-22
- GAS 34039-23
- GAS 34039-33
- GAZ 3409 BEAVER
  - GAZ 34091

=== Wheeled ATVs ===
Transmash manufactured wheeled ATV's equipped with large high flotation tires

- ЗВМ-3966/SBU-3966 (based on the GAZ-66)
- ЗВМ-3908/SBU-3908 (based on the GAZ Sadko)
- Kержак 4×4/Kerzhak 4×4 (based on the GAZ Gazelle)
- Кержак 6×6/Kerzhak 6×6 (based a 6×6 conversion of the GAZ Gazelle)
- Кержак 4×4/Kerzhak 4×4 with AMAZONE ZA-M Fertilizer spreaders (based on the GAZ Gazelle chassis cab
- ТТС 8110 (a two wheeled trailer)

== Issues ==
Such vehicles were also used by the South Sudanese's government forces and associated militia's offensive in April 2018, which enabled them to assault previously inaccessible marshlands and swamps. The offensive led to extensive human rights violations, which included gang rapes, summary execution, tortures and enslavement of civilians.

== See also ==
- Trekol - another Russian large ATV manufacturer
