= Electrocar =

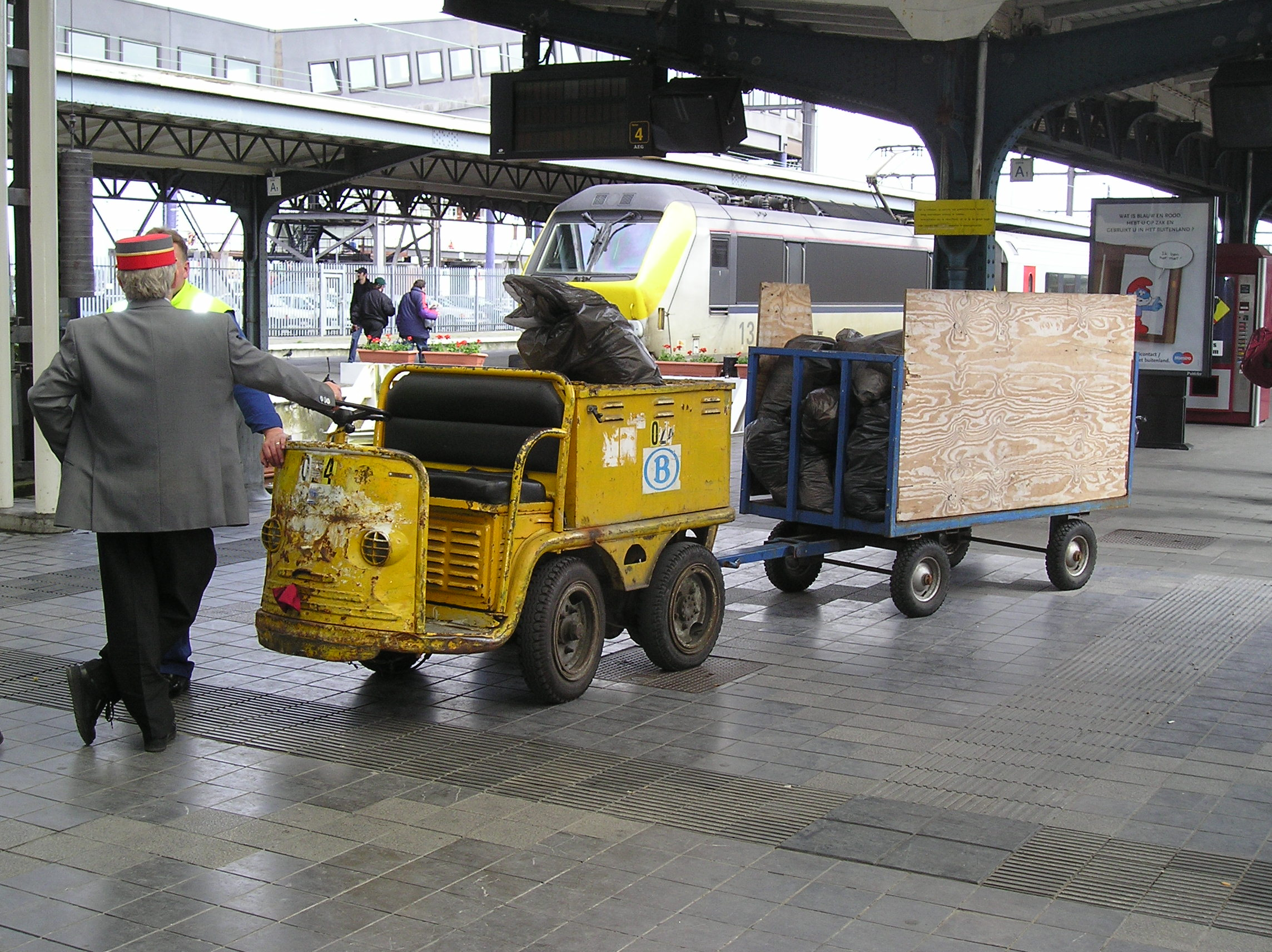
Small electric vehicle in Ostend train station, Belgium

Electrocar, Electrocart is an electric vehicle, typically a small cart with an electrical driving gear and a storage battery.

In the United Kingdom, similar small electric vehicles were known as electric drays.

A typical Soviet/Belarusian electrocar EC-1.00 (and also its modifications, including EC-1.00-1 designed and manufactured (as of 2007) at Mogilev Automobile Plant (MoAZ) is frequently used in factories for the transportation of not so heavy loads, because it does not emit harmful exhaust.

== MoAZ EC-1.00 specifications ==
Electrocar EC-1.00

Overview
- Manufacturer: MoAZ

Body and chassis
- Class: Small electric vehicles

Powertrain
- Engine: 4,0 kW, 80V (electrical)

Dimensions
- Length: 3,315 mm (130.5 in)
- Width: 1,300 mm (51.2 in)
- Height: 2,200 mm (86.6 in)
- Curb weight: 1,750 kg (3,858 lb)

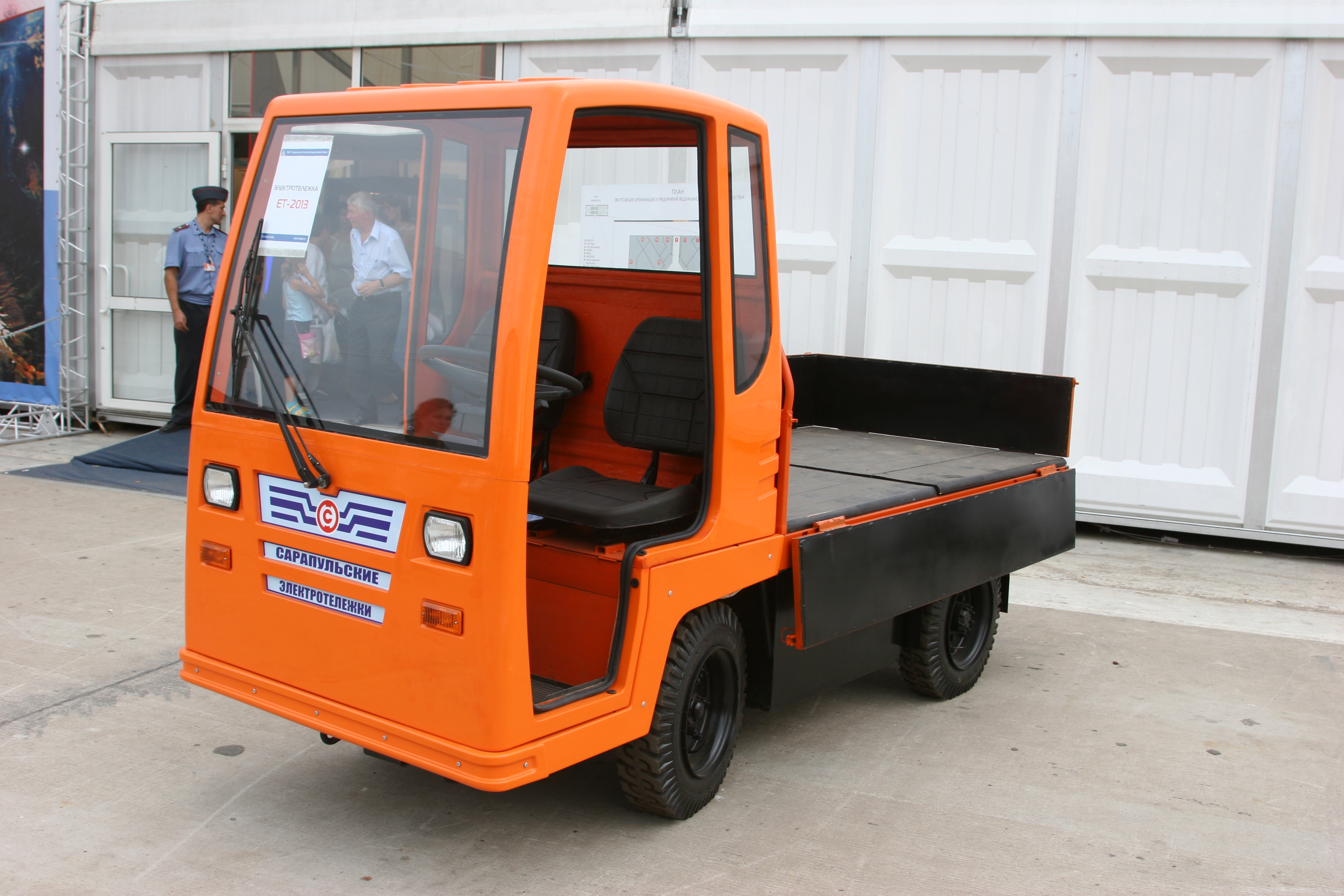
Sarapul Automobile Plant electrocar on 2007 MAKS Airshow

- Maximum load - 2,000 kg (4,409 lb)
- Full mass - 1,750 kg (3,858 lb)
- Dimensions - 3315 mm (length) x 1300 mm (width) x 2200 mm (height)
- Cargo platform dimensions - 2050 mm (l) x 1300 mm (w)
- Max loading height - 800 mm (31.5 in)
- Min outer turning radius - 2,900 mm (114.2 in)
- Max velocity - 20 km/h (12 mph)
- Nominal engine power - 4,0 kW
- Nominal voltage - 80V
- Control system - thyristor-impulse- (GTO) or contactor-based

== See also ==
- Battery electric vehicle
- Forklift truck
- Electric platform truck
