= Yarovit Motors =

Russian automotive company

- Type: Joint Stock Company
- Industry: Automotive
- Founded: 2003; 23 years ago
- Defunct: 2014
- Fate: Bankrupted
- Headquarters: Saint Petersburg, Russia
- Key people: Andrey Biryukov
- Products: Heavy road vehicles Offroad vehicles

CJSC Yarovit Motors (Russian: Яровит Моторс, "spring") was a St. Petersburg, Russia company engaged in the SKD assembly and modification of trucks and road tractors road vehicles of the Dutch truck company Terberg. JSC "YAROVIT MOTORS" was created in 2003 when Yarovit Holdings purchased the former Leningrad Metal Plant.

In Russia, Yarovit vehicles are positioned as a multi-axle-highway trucks and cargo capacity for the transport of goods in difficult road and weather conditions. YAROVIT trucks belong to classes 6 and 7 trucks with gross vehicle weight from 20.0 to 40.0 tons and more than 40 tons, respectively.

According to the classification of vehicles, adopted by the UNECE Regulations trucks, YAROVITs belongs to the category N3 - vehicles, which include trucks, cars, tractors, special vehicles with a gross vehicle weight exceeding 12 tonnes.

According to the classification of trucks, adopted by the United States, the car belongs to a class of heavy trucks (Heavy Duty), with a gross weight of more than 15 tons.

In 2007 only 20 trucks were assembled an in 2008 only 19 units, although the capabilities of the enterprise itself made it possible to assemble up to 500 trucks per year.

In September 2014, a bankruptcy petition was filed for the plant and production ceased. In 2018 an investigation into billionaire Mikhail Prokhorov was launched.

== Products ==
The YAROVIT range of trucks is based on the on Terberg 6x6, 8x8, 10x8 chassis. These chassis are the basis for the development of families of three families of vehicles:

GLOROS (cab over engine), trucks for road and off-road use with the arrangement of the LPC. Yarovit utilizes Belkarplastik cabs as Terberg cabs were manufactured by DAF Trucks a division of Paccar;

DOGMUS (bonnet layout), trucks for road and off-road use with the arrangement of spacecraft;

ORDEX (for installation of special equipment chassis-cab, placed in front of the engine), special-purpose trucks with the arrangement of the ARC.

Additionally Yarovit creates other wheel formulas, different layout schemes varied choices. On the basis of the chassis are built on a variety of functional purpose trucks such as dump trucks, tractors, timber haulers, concrete mixers, etc.

== Hybrid vehicles ==
In April 2010, "YAROVIT Motors" presented the concept of an affordable, hybrid Russian city car, to support the development of which the president of Onexim Mikhail Prokhorov .

The main characteristics of the new car (brand E-mobile)

It is assumed that the car will be a series circuit hybrid. In this scheme, electricity is produced on board the vehicle by a generator driven by a combustion engine - gasoline engine, diesel engine or a gas-powered (the same scheme planned for the Chevrolet Volt).

- Curb weight - no more than 700 kg
- Maximum speed - 130 km/h
- Range - 1100 km
- Fuel consumption - 3.5 liters / 100 km
- Drive motor power with the recovery - about 50 kW
- The number of units and parts - 2-2.5 times less than in a conventional car
