= UAZ Simba =

Motor vehicle

The UAZ Simba are two different UAZ designed 4×2 or 4×4 wheel drive minibus concepts with the same name created in 1999 and 2002 respectively. The production launches of these two minibuses have been cancelled. The Simba has a wheelbase of 3,000 mm (120 in) and is a combination of a 7-9-person van and an SUV. It shares many common components with UAZ-3162 SUV. Simba family prototypes were shown at the Moscow Auto Salon from 1999 to 2005, but did not reach production for financial reasons.

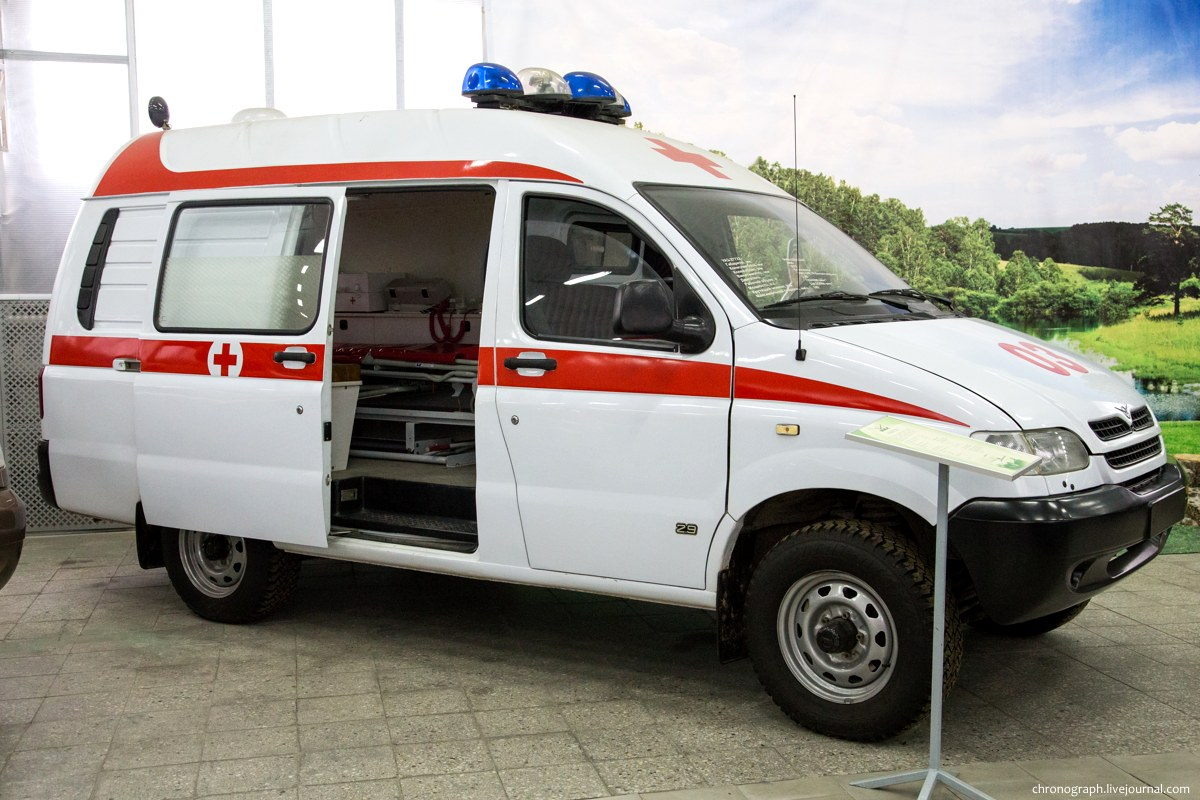
1999 UAZ-3165 (UAZ-27722 ambulance)

The Simba was based on an enhanced UAZ Simbir platform. The Simba family provided for the modification of a long 3,000 mm (120 in) wheelbase which contained a 250 mm (9.8 in) rear overhang. The Simba's roof was 460 mm (18 in) taller than the Simbir's, which allowed to increase the capacity up to 13 passengers. UAZ-3165 was planning on offering one petrol engine, the UFG 249.10, or the turbo-diesel ZMZ-5143.10, producing 132 and 98 hp (97 and 72 kW) respectively. The only transmission option was to have been a manual 5-speed gearbox. The gross vehicle weight (GVR) was 3 tons, maximum speed 142–160 km/h (88–99 mph).

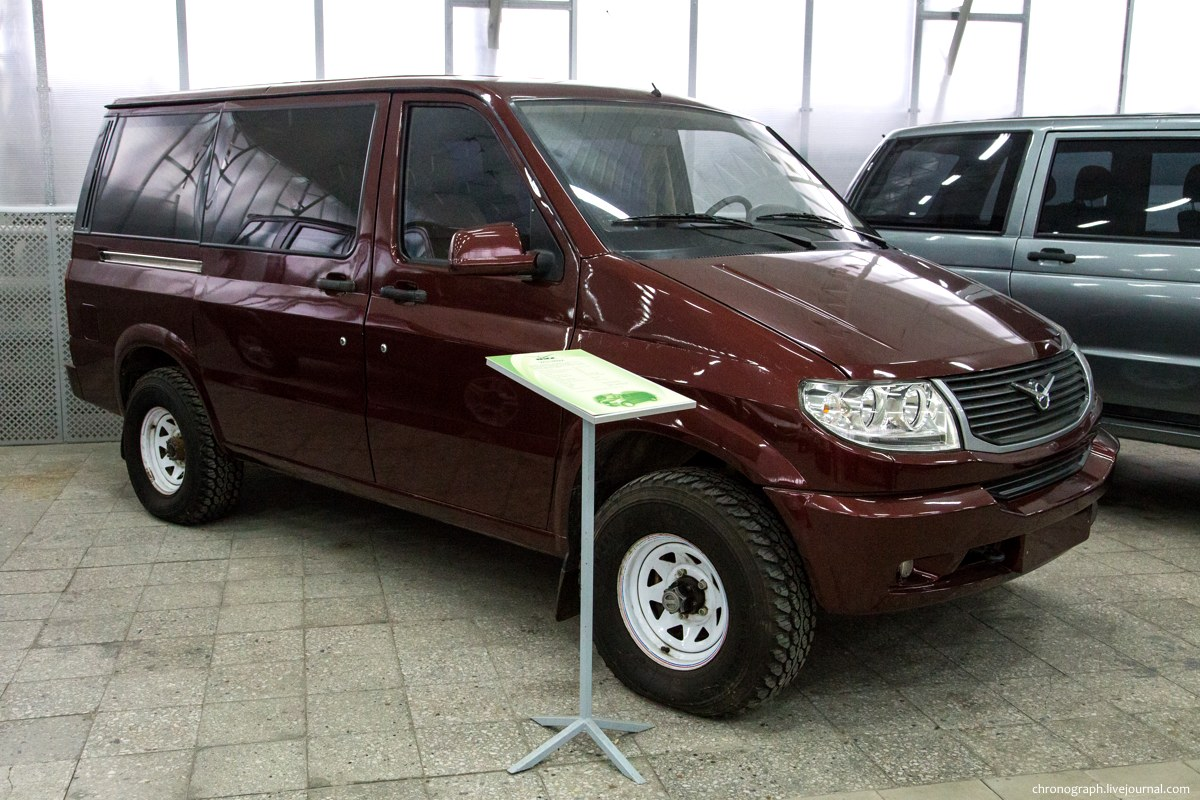
2002 UAZ-3165М minibus

Several prototypes have been presented at the car shows:

- UAZ-3165 - minibus with ZMZ-409 motor
- UAZ-Combi - minibus with a high plastic roof
- UAZ-27722 - ambulance
- UAZ-2365 - flatbed truck

== See also ==
- UAZ-452 - UAZ minibus
- GAZ Sobol - GAZ minibus
