= UAZ Patriot =

Russian mid-size body-on-frame SUV

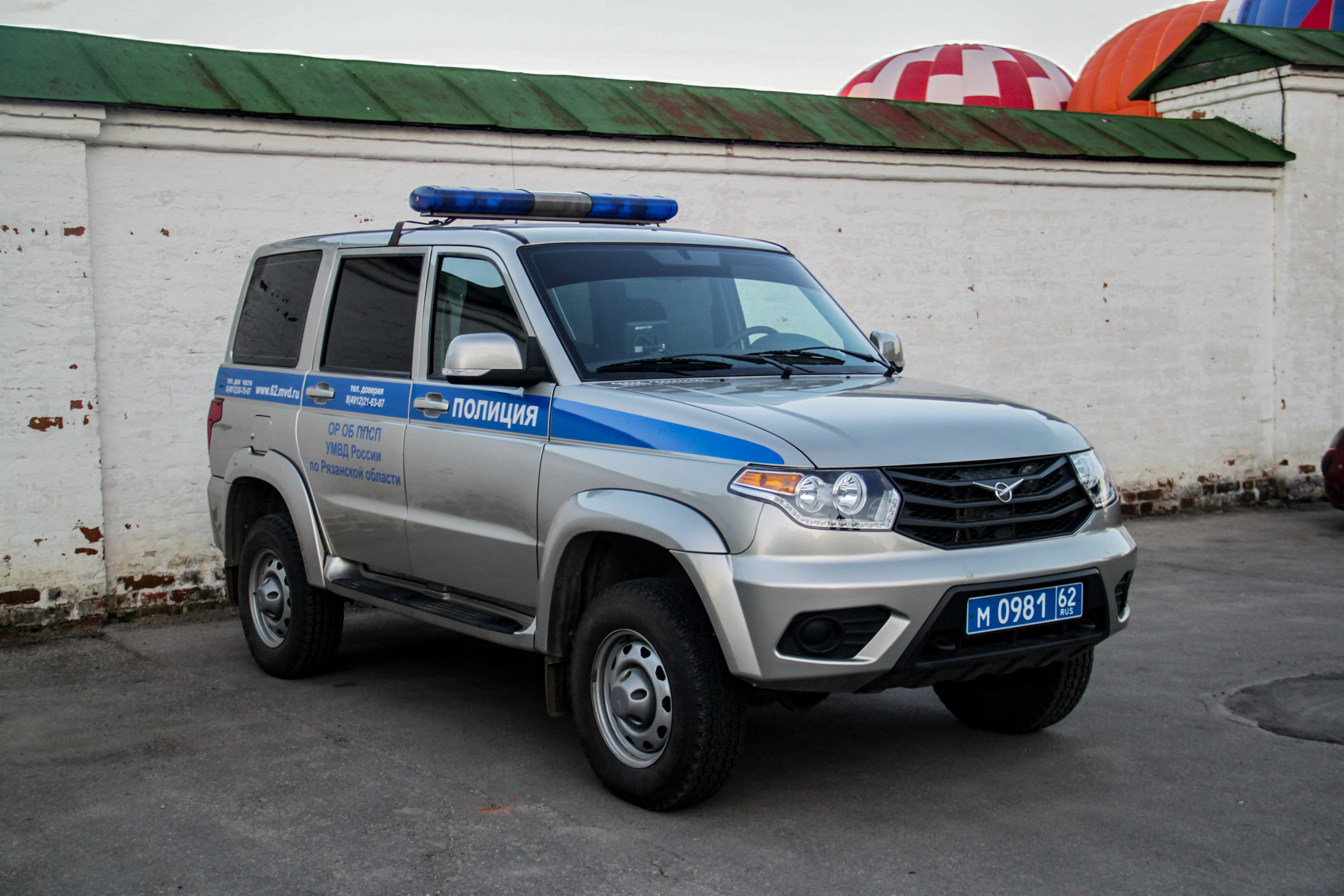

Overview
- Manufacturer: UAZ
- Also called: UAZ Kazak (Colombia, Chile); UAZ Patrol (Mexico); Baijah Tulos (Germany, 2007–2012); Bremach 4x4 SUV (United States)
- Production: 2005–present
- Assembly: Russia: Ulyanovsk

Body and chassis
- Class: Mid-size SUV
- Body style: 5-door wagon, 4-door Pickup truck
- Layout: FR/4WD

Powertrain
- Engine: 2.7 L ZMZ-409.10; 2.6 L Andoria-Mot; 2.3 L Iveco F1A diesel; 2.2 L ZMZ-51432 diesel; 2.7 L GM I4
- Transmission: 5-speed manual, 6-speed automatic

Dimensions
- Length: 4,647 mm (183.0 in)
- Width: 2,080 mm (81.9 in)
- Height: 1,900 mm (74.8 in); 2,000 mm (78.7 in)
- Curb weight: 2,070 kg (4,563.6 lb)

Chronology
- Predecessor: UAZ Simbir

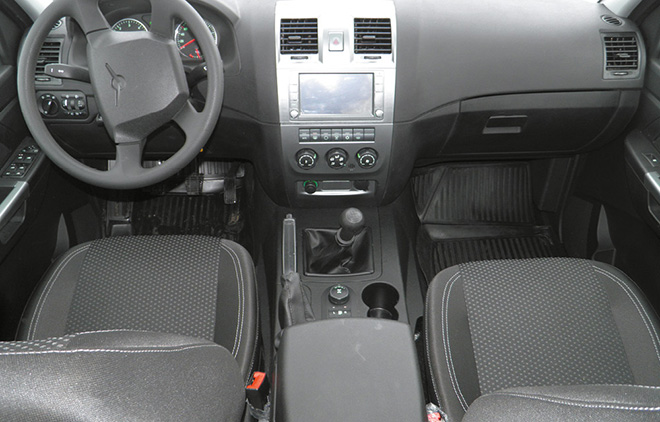
UAZ Pickup interior

The UAZ Patriot (Russian: УАЗ Патриот [UAZ-3163]) is a mid-size SUV with a body-on-frame construction produced by the UAZ division of Sollers in Ulyanovsk, Russia. It was introduced in 2005 and replaced the older UAZ Simbir (UAZ-3162). Extensive use of newer parts, large carrying capacity, good off-road capabilities and an affordable price (<US$5,000) predicted good sales in Russia; 12,011 units were sold in the year 2007.

The SUV accommodates five adults and can carry about 200 kilograms (440 lb) of cargo.

== Timeline ==
In October 2011, UAZ announced the release of a limited edition SUV in honour of the 70th anniversary of the plant. Cars of the anniversary series have different exterior and interior trim details.

In May 2012, the plant built a restyled model of the UAZ Patriot with a different dashboard, which no longer had a handle for the front passenger. It had a new, safer four-spoke steering wheel from the Japanese Company Takata-Petri, 2DIN media player and a USB-connector for flash drives.

In August 2013, UAZ started the production of a renewed Patriot with a new transfer case Dymos featuring electronic control.

A facelifted UAZ Patriot debuted in 2014: the SUV got new bumpers, headlights, seats, an optional multimedia system with navigation and a rear back-up camera, some chassis improvements, a new turbocharger for the diesel engine and updated switchgear from the Astra J and the Astra K.

The UAZ Patriot 4×4 and pickup were to be imported into the United States as the Bremach 4×4 SUV and Bremach Brio in 2022, but Bremach announced a cessation of operations and refunds of deposits as a consequence of the Russian invasion of Ukraine.

== Versions ==
Note that the Patriot Sport has been discontinued while the UAZ Cargo and UAZ Profi are now the UAZ Professional, and the UAZ Pickup truck is marketed separately.

- UAZ Patriot Diesel (Originally the UAZ-31631, now the 31638) — equipped with the IVECO F1A (Fiat Ducato) 2.3 L 116 hp turbodiesel, it meets Euro-3 emission standards, has a top speed of 145 km/h (90 mph) and uses 9.5 L/100 km (25 mpg_{‑US}). Since 2012 it is available as the 31638 with the domestically produced turbodiesel ZMZ-51432 meeting Euro-4.
- UAZ Cargo (UAZ-23602-050) — commercial pickup based on the 3163, with a long 3,000 mm (120 in) wheelbase and a shortened 2-person cabin. Available since 2008.

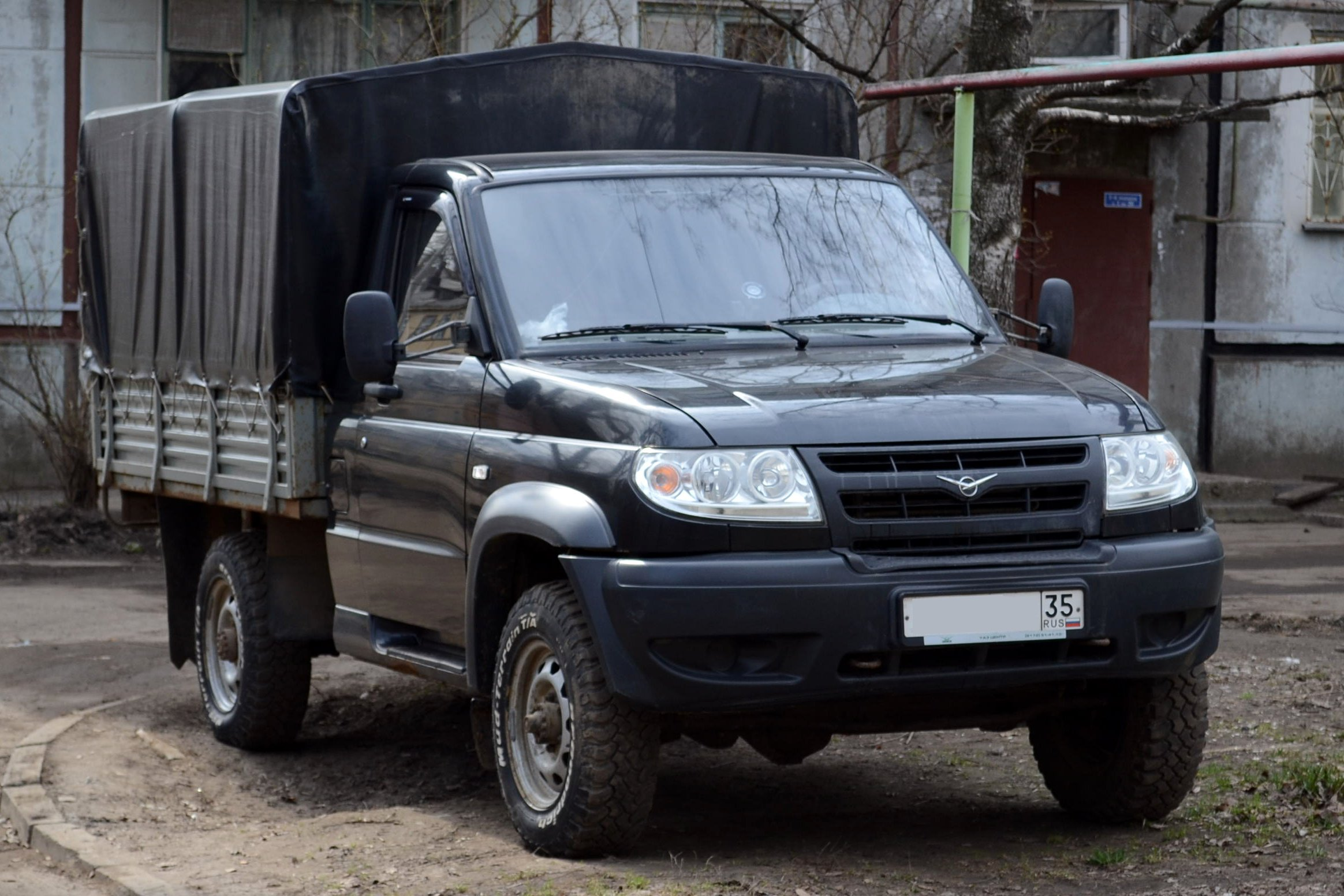
Uaz Cargo 230602-050

Stereo image
Left frame
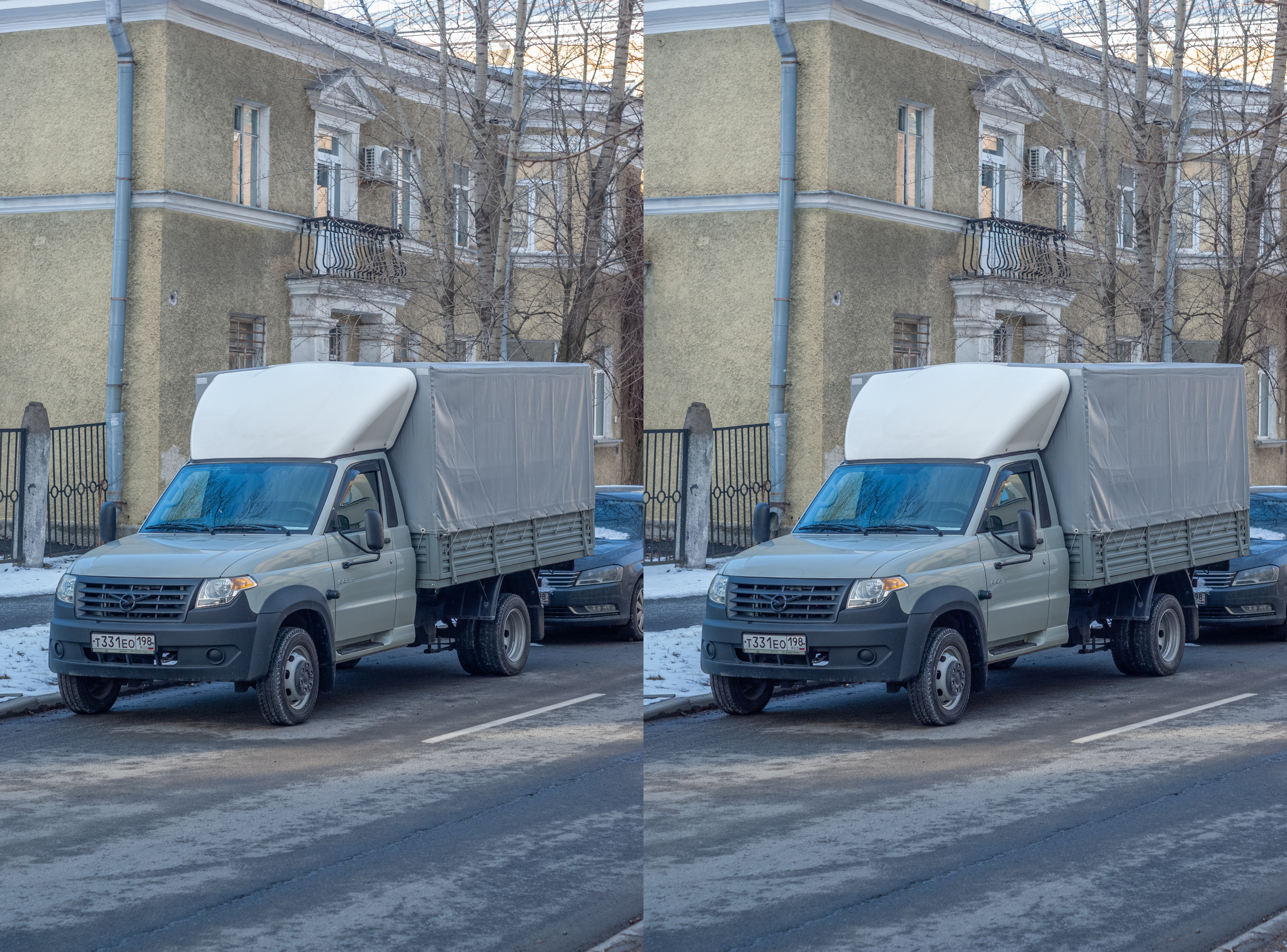
Right frame
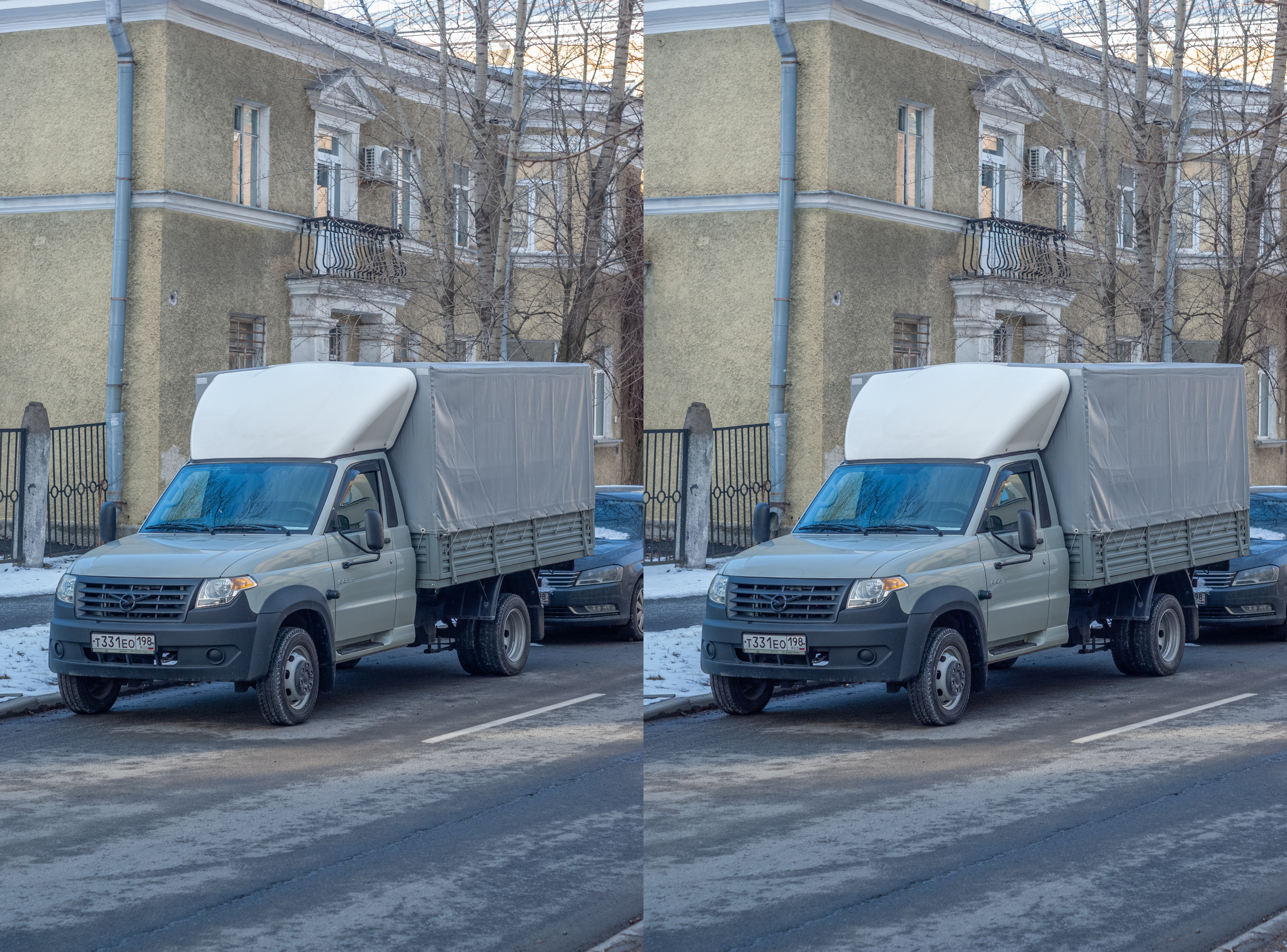
Parallel view
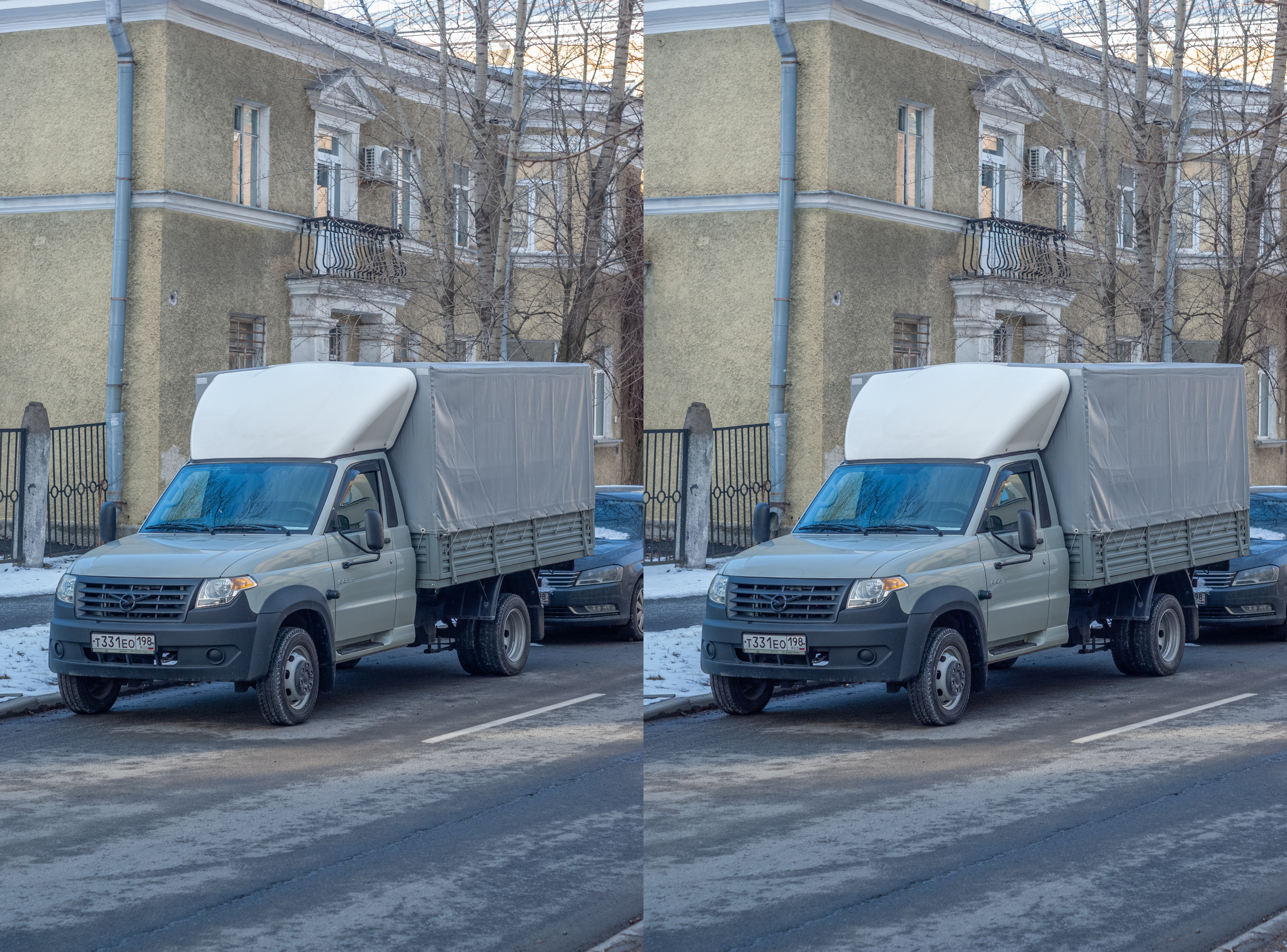
Cross-eye view
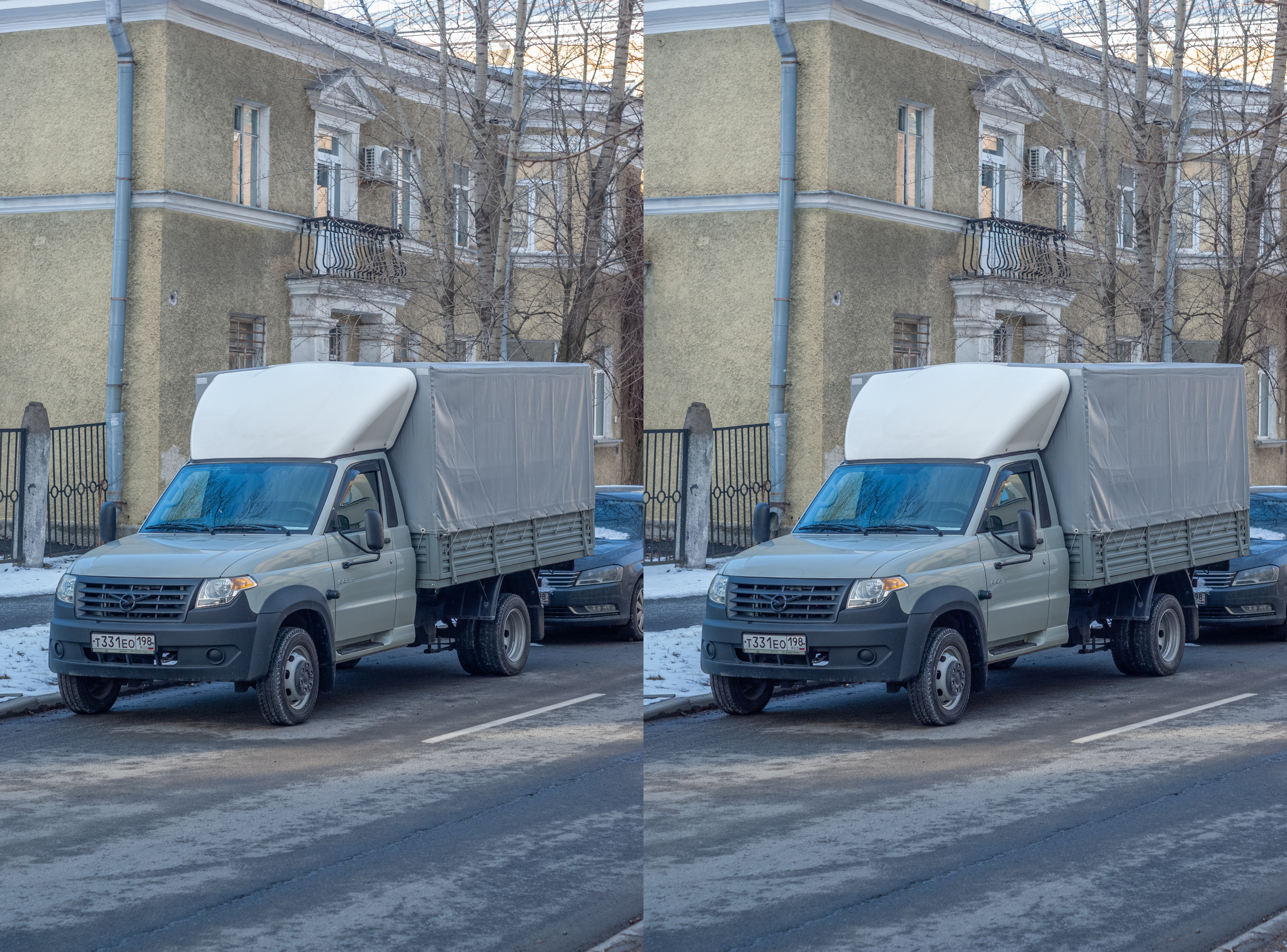

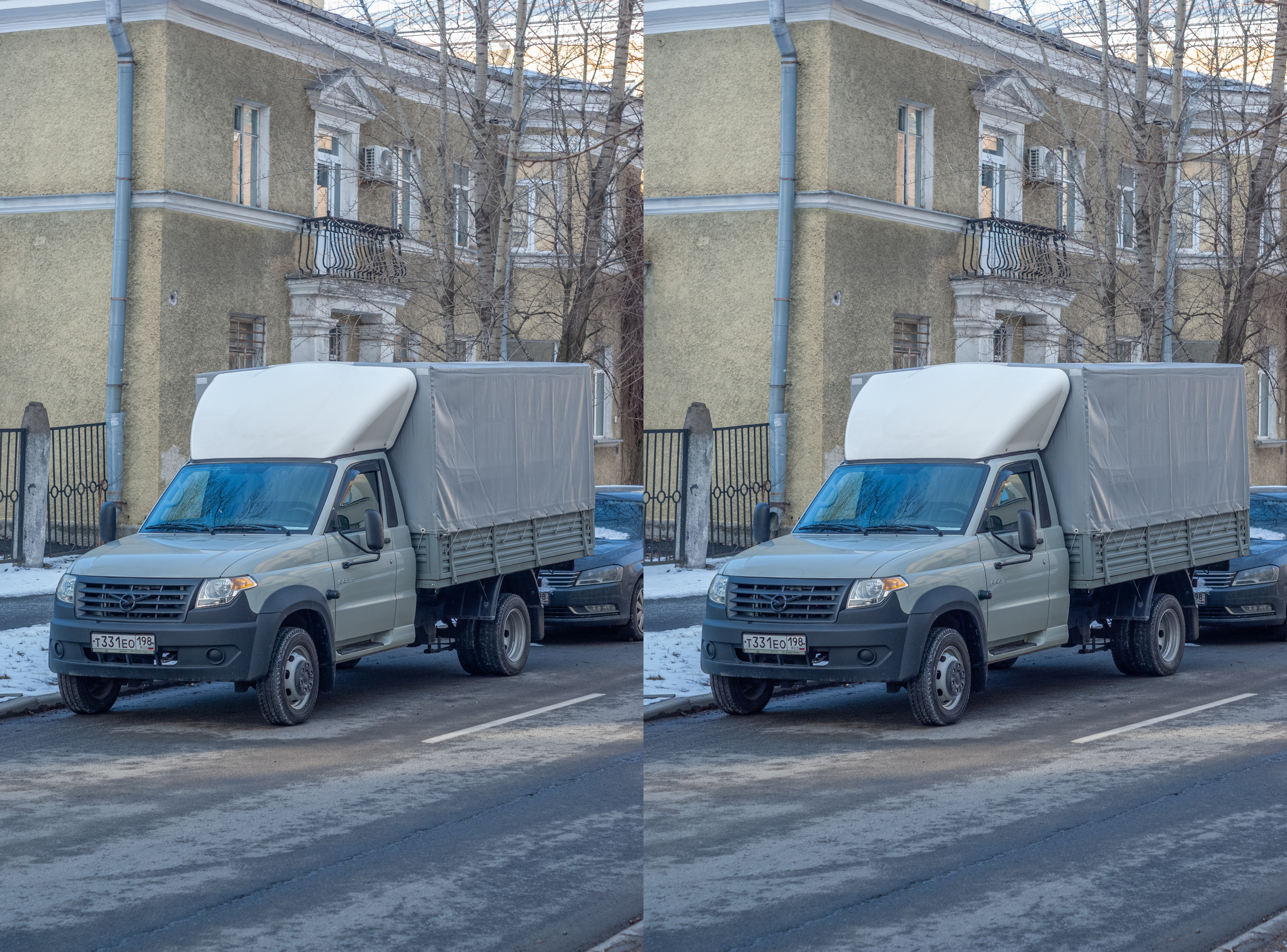
- UAZ Cargo in Russia

- UAZ Pickup (UAZ-23632) — a 4-door 5-seat pickup truck based on the 3163, also with a 3000-mm long wheelbase. The pickup payload is 725 kg (1,598 lb). Available since August 2008.

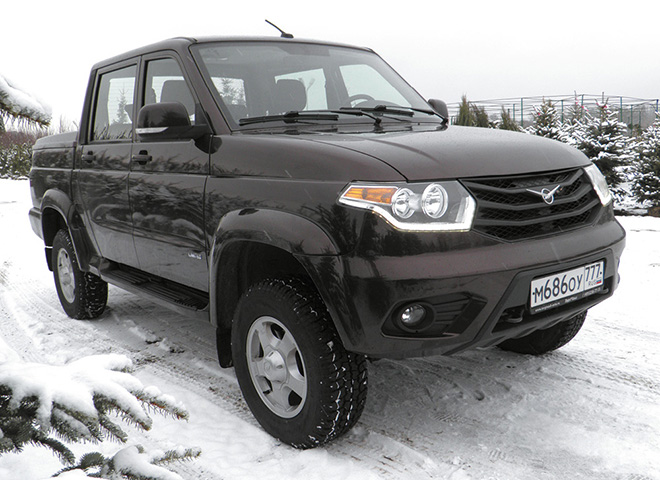
UAZ Pickup

- UAZ Patriot Sport (UAZ-3164) — shorter-wheelbase version (wheelbase is reduced by 360 mm (14 in) and is 2,400 mm (94 in), the length of the car to 4,287 mm (168.8 in) and luggage compartment volume was reduced to 960 liters (34 cubic feet)). It was positioned by the developers as a car "for young and active people." Unlike the standard model, the UAZ Patriot Sport has a more narrow rear door openings and is the successor to the UAZ-3160. Due to the shorter overhangs the car has better maneuverability and a smaller turning radius. The UAZ-3164 features two different 2.7-liter petrol engines: the ZMZ-40904 producing 128 hp (Limited Edition) and the 112-horsepower ZMZ-4091 (in the Classic and Comfort versions). The transmission is a 5-speed manual from Korean Dymos Inc., similar to the one that is installed on the standard UAZ Patriot. The production of the UAZ Patriot Sport launched on July 1, 2010. On December 1, 2010, it was temporarily halted.

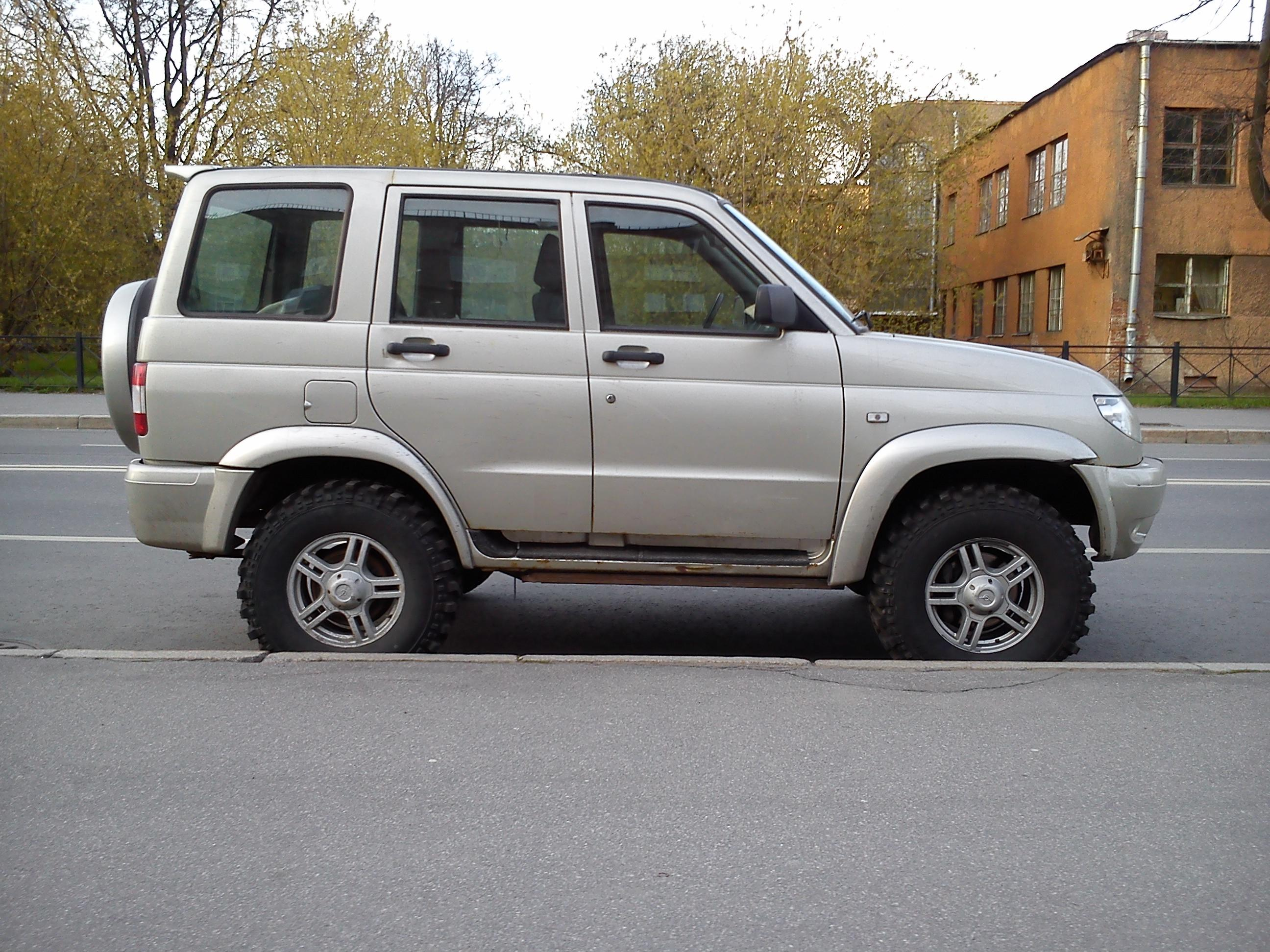
UAZ Patriot Sport

- UAZ Profi (UAZ-236021, UAZ-236022, UAZ-236323, UAZ-236324) - commercial pickup based UAZ-3163, but with elongated to 3,500 mm (140 in) wheelbase, a short two-seater or dual four-door 5-seater cabin, cargo platform with two different width. UAZ Pros is equipped with rear- or all-wheel drive, engine ZMZ-409 051 with the increased to 147 hp relative to the initial capacity of the engine ZMZ-40906. Series production began in August 2017.

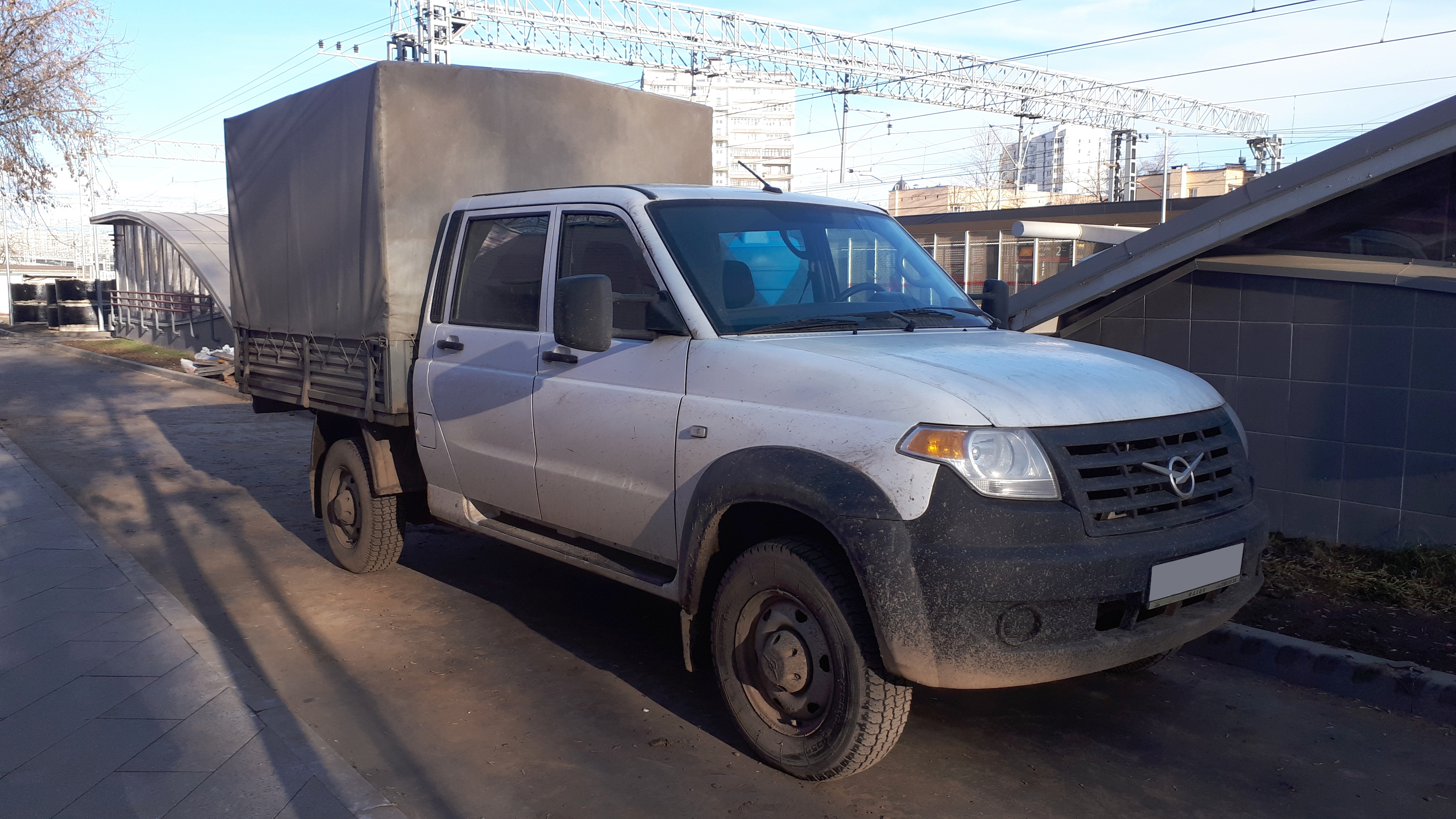
Uaz Profi 23632

== Specifications ==
- Wheel configuration: 4x4
- Number of seats: 5(9*)
- Dimensions: 4,647 mm × 2,080 mm × 1,900 mm (183.0 in × 81.9 in × 74.8 in)/2000 (with roof frames)
- Road clearance: 210 mm (8.27 in)
- Equipped vehicle weight: 2,070 kg (4,560 lb)
- Full weight: 2,670 kg (5,890 lb)
- Cargo capacity: 800 kg (1,800 lb)
- Max. speed: 150 km/h (93 mph)
- Fuel consumption at 90 km/h (56 mph): 14 L/100 km (17 mpg_{‑US}) / 10.4 L/100 km (23 mpg_{‑US}) / 13.2 L/100 km (17.8 mpg_{‑US}) (city /out-of-town/ mixed cycles)
- Engine: ZMZ-409.10 Inline-four engine
- Fuel: Gasoline A-92
- Bore X stroke: 95.5 mm × 94 mm (3.76 in × 3.70 in)
- Displacement: 2,693 cc (2.7 L; 164.3 cu in)
- Maximum power: 135 PS; 133 bhp (99 kW) at 4600 rpm.
- Maximum torque: 217 N⋅m (160 lbf⋅ft) at 3900 rpm.
- Transmission: Mechanical, 5-stage
- Gearbox: 2-stage (I-1, II-1,94)
- Front brakes: ventilated disk-type with two cylinders and floating caliper
- Rear brakes: drum-type, with one cylinder, with automatic adjustment of the clearance between the lining and the drum
- Tyres: 225/75R16, 245/70R16

== State civil or military service ==
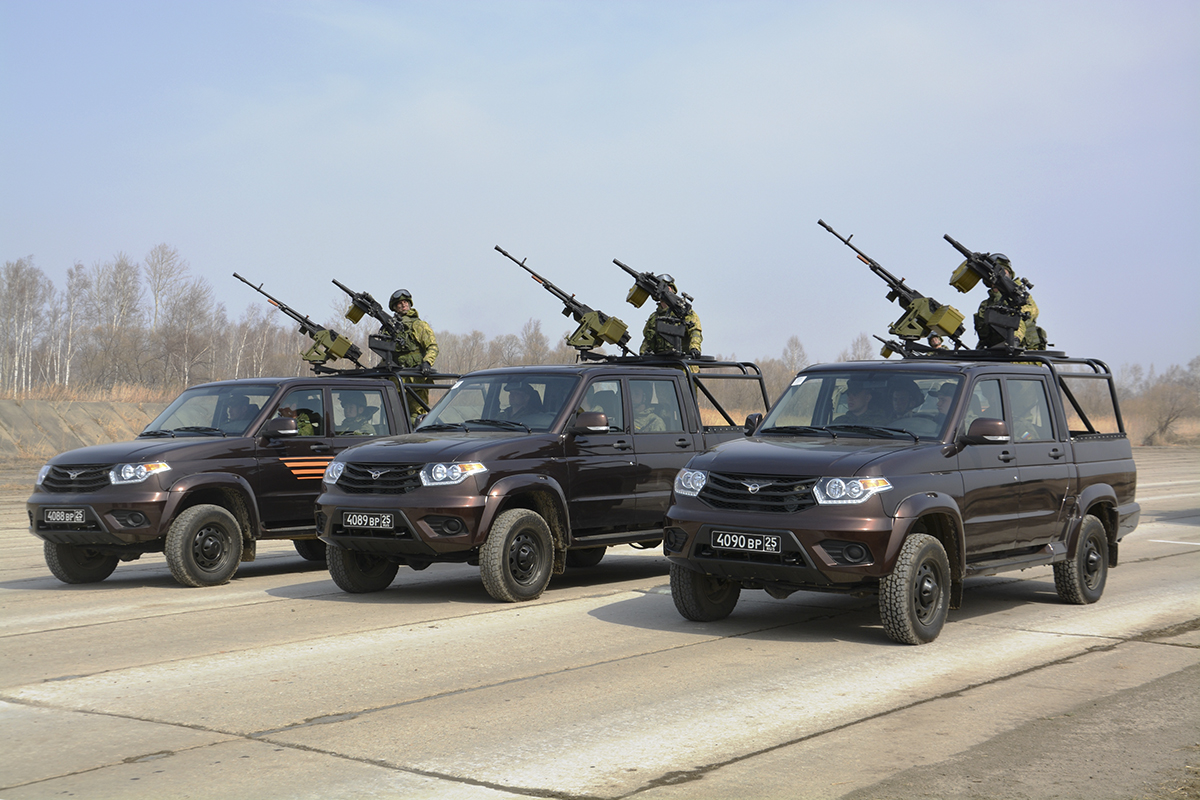
Russian Army UAZ Pickup technicals (Russian: УАЗ Пикап [УАЗ-23632])

- Belarus: Armed Forces of Belarus
- Nicaragua
- Russia - 1,500 cars were procured in 2023 by the Russian government.

Russian Police (including 28 armored cars)
Russian Border Troops
Russian Ground Forces As of the end of 2017, 90 UAZ Patriots in the "Pick-Up" version are in service with the 30th Motorized Brigade of the Infantry of the Russian Army, near Samara.

- Serbia: Serbian Armed Forces (64)
- Ukraine

National Police of Ukraine
Ukrainian Border Troops

== See also ==
- UAZ Simbir, a similar but smaller SUV.
- UAZ-469
- Lada Niva Travel, similar SUV from AvtoVAZ
- Lada Niva

== Bibliography ==
- Mark Galeotti & Adam Hook, Combat Vehicles of Russia's Special Forces – Spetsnaz, airborne, Arctic and interior troops, New Vanguard series 282, Osprey Publishing Ltd, Oxford 2020. ISBN 9781472841834
