= UAZ Jaguar =

UAZ-3907
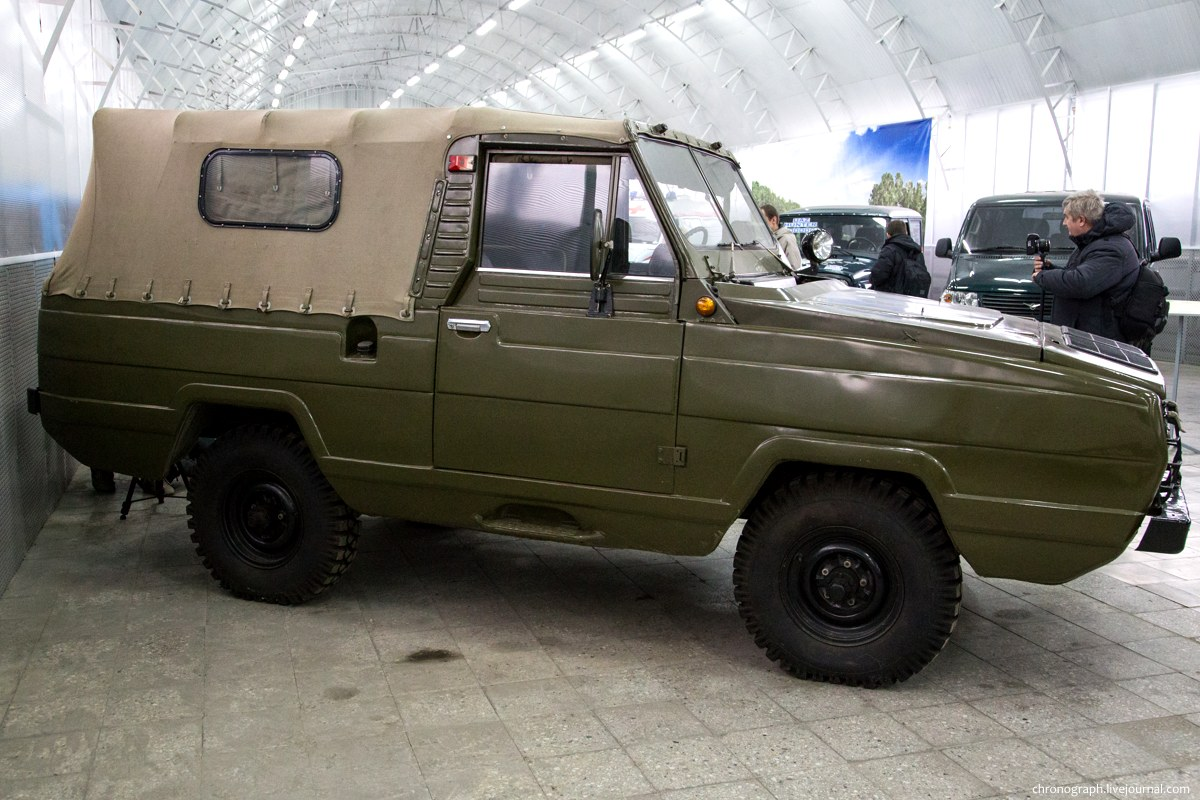
- UAZ Jaguar 4x4 Amphibian

Overview
- Production: Ulyanovsk Automobile Plant (Russia)

Body and chassis
- Body style: 2-door amphibious car
- Layout: Front-engine, four-wheel drive

Powertrain
- Engine: 4-cylinder UMZ 451 MI 2,450 cm^{3} (2.5 L) 53 kW (71.1 hp)
- Transmission: 4- or 5-speed manual gearbox 2-speed transfer case

The UAZ-3907 Jaguar (officially UAZ-3907 Ягуар Jaguar) is an amphibious 4x4 created in the Ulyanovsk Automobile Plant (UAZ), in 1976–1990, based on the components of the UAZ-469 4x4. The vehicle was not commercially produced.

== History ==
Design of an amphibious vehicle was started by designers of the Ulyanovsk Automobile Plant in 1976. A total of 14 were made in addition to the 1989 prototype. Cars were successfully tested and adapted for weapons. During testing the vehicle travelled on the Volga from Ulyanovsk to Astrakhan and back. However, in 1991, after losing prospective military orders following the fall of the Soviet Union, the Ulyanovsk Automobile Plant stopped preparations.

== Design ==
The design used engine, transmission, and suspension units from the UAZ-469. It had a flotation body with two hermetically closed doors, underfloor, in front of the rear axle – equipped with two propellers. The amphibious car is driven due to the rotation of the front wheels that perform the function of rudders (This contributes proximity screws that hold out the water through an arch of the front wheels).

== Variants ==
UAZ-39071 БАКЛАН Baklan (Cormorant) developed from 1986 to 1989, under a separate contract with the USSR's Committee for State Security Border Troops, modifications were developed and with the installation of six pairs of skis, radar, radio, machine gun, and a cell for search dogs.

== See also ==
- VAZ Reka another Soviet era amphibious 4x4
