= UAZ =

Russian automobile company

Ulyanovsky Avtomobilny Zavod (UAZ)

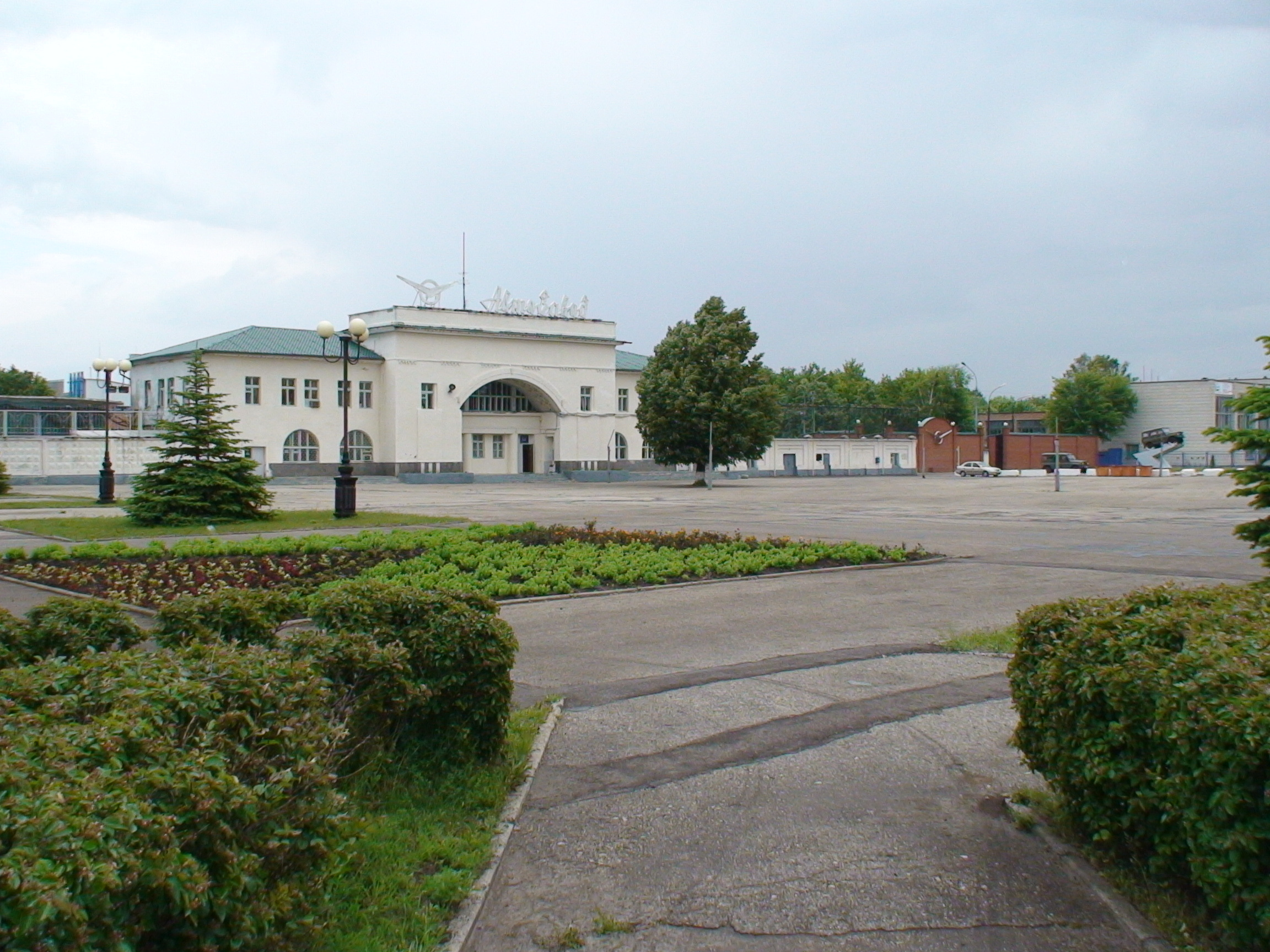
- Ulyanovskiy Avtozavod (UAZ) main entrance
- Company type: Private limited company
- Industry: Automotive
- Founded: 1941; 85 years ago
- Headquarters: Ulyanovsk, ULY, Russia
- Products: SUVs; Off-road vehicles; Buses; Pickups; Trucks
- Revenue: $601 million (2017)
- Operating income: −$29.8 million (2017)
- Net income: $26 million (2017)
- Total assets: $746 million (2017)
- Total equity: $236 million (2017)
- Parent: Sollers JSC
- Website: uaz.ru

UAZ or Ulyanovsky Avtomobilny Zavod (Russian: Ульяновский автомобильный завод, УАЗ, lit. 'Ulyanovsk Automobile Plant') is an automobile manufacturer based in Ulyanovsk, Russia, which manufactures off-road vehicles, buses and trucks. It has been part of the Sollers automotive group since 2000.

UAZ is best known for the UAZ-469 utility vehicle, which has seen wide use as a military vehicle in the Eastern bloc and around the world. The UAZ factory started production in 1941 as part of the Soviet war effort. 51,706 UAZ vehicles were produced in 2016.

== History ==
=== War and postwar ===
The Ulyanovsk Automobile Plant was founded in 1941 as a direct result of the German invasion of the Soviet Union. In response to this threat, the government of Joseph Stalin ordered the evacuation of strategically crucial industrial centers to the East. By October 1941, the rapid German drive to Moscow, triggered the decision to relocate the Moscow automotive manufacturer ZIS to the Volga town of Ulyanovsk. The town, already a nascent industrial center with a sufficiently developed infrastructure and a good supply of skilled workers, would be an ideal location for the reconstituted factory. It was also safely out of reach of the German army. At that time of its founding, the plant was considered a subsidiary of ZIS. By 1942, the plant began production of artillery shells and automobiles. The first vehicle produced at the plant was the ZIS-5 three-ton truck.

In 1943, when the prospect of a German victory had become far less likely, it was decided the relocated plant would remain in Ulyanovsk and be separated administratively from ZIS, which would be rebuilt in Moscow from scratch. This was in line with the Soviet post-war policy regarding various relocated industrial operations. It was considered more efficient to leave the newly built plants as is, while the original plants, provided they survived the war were outfitted anew, frequently with captured German machinery. At the end of 1944, the production of the ZIS-5 was transferred to The Ural Automotive Plant in Miass, while the Ulyanovsk plant began producing the smaller GAZ-AA in 1947. UAZ developed a prototype 1.5-tonne truck in 1948, using the ubiquitous 50 hp (37 kW; 51 PS) 2,112 cc (129 cu in) inline four of the Pobeda; this, the UAZ-300, was never built, due to a lack of production capacity. In 1954, production was expanded to include the GAZ-69, and the first batches were assembled from GAZ parts. Two years later, the factory was not just assembling GAZ-69s from parts delivered elsewhere, but manufacturing them in their entirety.

The connection with GAZ led UAZ to be the top Soviet manufacturer of four-wheel drive vehicles.

=== Golden age ===
UAZ began its growth away from being a mere assembler in 1954, with the creation of its own design office. It was this office, responding to a request from the Red Army, that in 1955 created a forward control van project, codenamed "Forty", on the GAZ-69 chassis. This became the UAZ-450, the first Soviet "cabover" truck. The prototype appeared in 1956, and was tested in both the Caucasus Mountains and the Crimea. Its loaded weight was 2.7 tonnes, and it, like all the UAZ-450 series vehicles, was powered by a 62 hp (46 kW; 63 PS) low-compression 2,432 cc (148.4 cu in) inline-four (based on the ubiquitous Pobeda's, but with an 88 mm (3.5 in) bore, rather than 82 mm (3.2 in)), and the Pobeda's three-speed transmission, while the transfer case, drive axles, leaf springs, and drum brakes came from the GAZ-69.

In 1958, UAZ began production of the UAZ-450 series of trucks and vans. The first model was the UAZ-450A ambulance; with room for two stretchers and four-wheel drive, it was arguably the best in the world for use in remote areas. It was followed by the UAZ-450D drop-side pickup, which had an 800 kg (1,800 lb) payload; the UAZ-450 van, with a 750 kg (1,650 lb) payload; and the 11-seat UAZ-450V microbus. All the UAZ-450 series were capable of disconnecting the front drive axle and of reaching 56 mph (90 km/h), achieving fuel economy of 14 L/100 km (17 mpg_{‑US}; 20 mpg_{‑imp}), and of towing an 850 kg (1,870 lb) trailer.

A two-wheel drive variant of the UAZ-450 was announced on 12 December 1961, with the UAZ-450's 2,300 mm (91 in) wheelbase and engine, as the UAZ-451 (van), UAZ-451D (drop-side pickup), UAZ-451A (ambulance), and UAZ-451B (minibus). The ambulance spawned a prototype UAZ-452GP with hydropneumatic suspension, to enable it to cross rough ground at high speed, following on the work done by Citroën on the DS19. The system proved very successful on trials, but it was rejected by the Soviet Army as too complicated, and so never entered production.

In 1966, the UAZ-451s were updated with a 70 hp (52 kW; 71 PS) 2,432 cc (148.4 cu in) inline-four (still based on the Pobeda's), four-speed gearbox, and minor detail changes, plus a stronger chassis (and so higher payload). The models were a redesignated UAZ-451M (van, with an 800 kg (1,800 lb) payload) and a UAZ-451DM (pickup, with a 1,000 kg (2,200 lb) payload). Maximum speed was 59 mph (95 km/h).

In 1966, the four-wheel drives were renumbered UAZ-452 (van), UAZ-452D (pickup), UAZ-452V (minibus), UAZ-452A and UAZ-452G (both ambulances, with different patient capacities). There was also the UAZ-452S ambulance, specially designed for Arctic conditions, with more heating capacity, double-glazed windows, and insulation; they proved able to keep a 30 °C interior temperature in −60 °C outside conditions. The UAZ-452 was able to cross 50 cm (20 in) of snow and carry an 800 kg (1,800 lb) load. The UAZ-452s would go on to become a workhorse of Soviet agriculture and police, with the pickup proving a popular commercial vehicle. Export versions of the UAZ-452D were called Trekmaster when sold in Britain, but never in large numbers; there was also a version with a British-built dump body, the Tipmaster.

The UAZ-451S was a snow-crossing variant with front skis and rear tracks; it was never produced in quantity, nor was the UAZ-451S2, which had tracks at front and rear. The UAZ-452 also served as the basis for an articulated model, the UAZ-452P, that was never put into production.

In 1972 the well-regarded, but outdated, GAZ-69 was replaced by the more modern UAZ-469. This was developed from the UAZ-471 of 1958 (with four-wheel independent suspension, which proved too complex) and the UAZ-460. The UAZ-469 was a sturdy, but not-so-comfortable vehicle with the ability to overcome virtually any terrain, while also providing ease of maintenance. The UAZ-469 was not made available to the civilian market until the late 1980s, before which time it was built exclusively for police and military use, as well as heads of agricultural enterprises (kolhozes and sovkhozes). A commercially available variant was produced by the Lutzk Automotive Works.

=== Later years ===
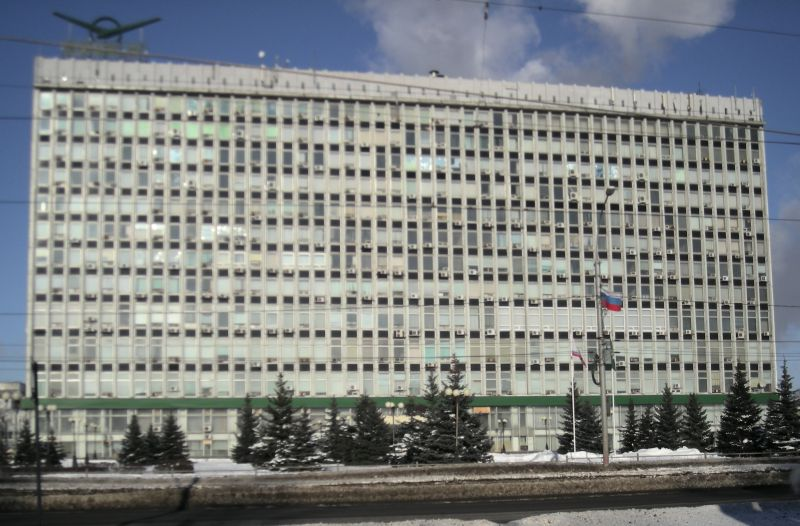
UAZ headquarters building

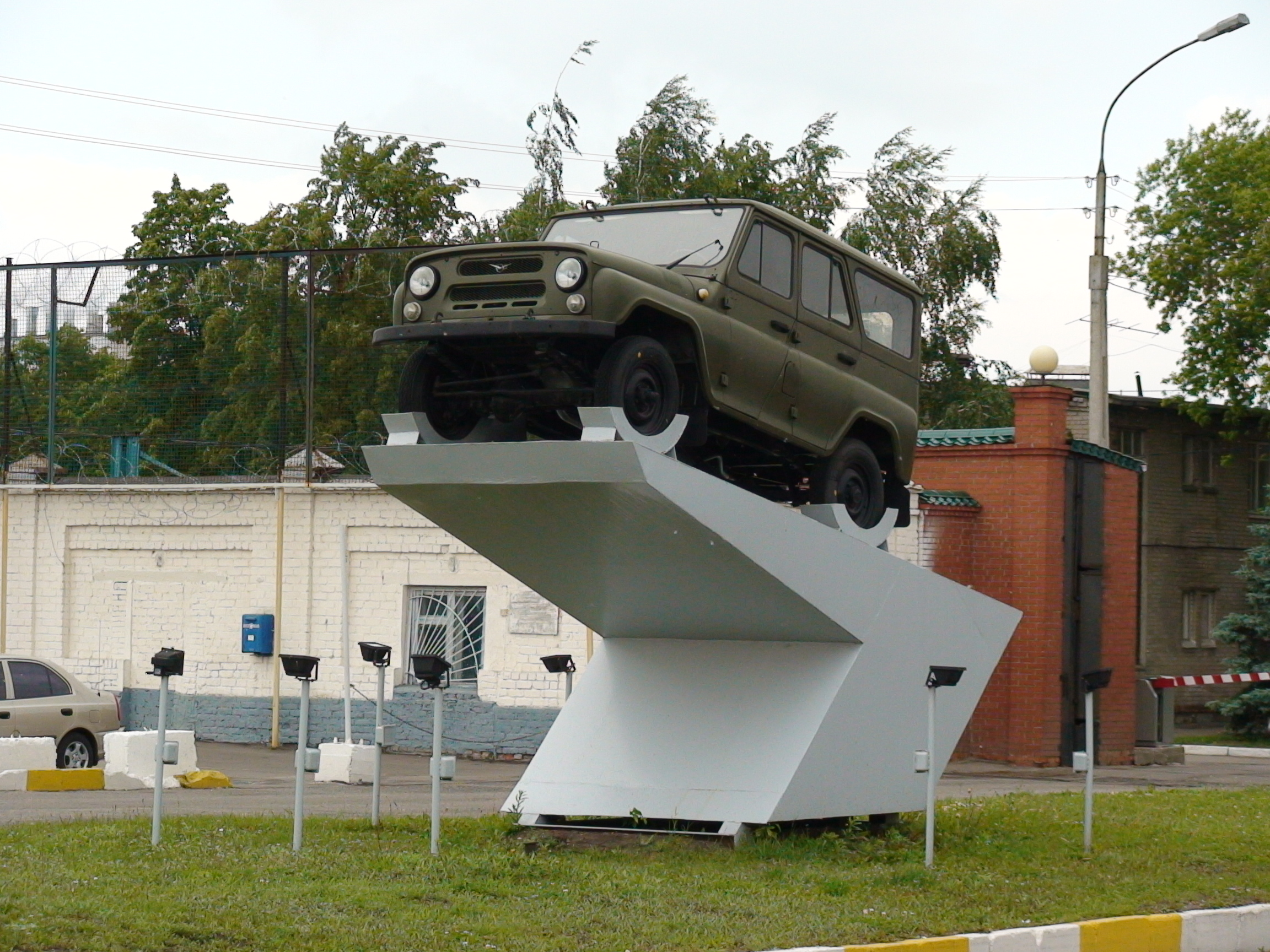
UAZ-469 stella at UAZ plant in Ulyanovsk

In the 1990s, following the dissolution of the Soviet Union, UAZ became a joint-stock company and soon received the Golden Globe and Golden Mercury Awards for a significant volume of sales and its contribution to the Russian economy.

On 5 August 1997, the new UAZ-3160 went into production and received a gold medal at an international fair in Yekaterinburg. The car was used as the basis for the later Simbir and UAZ-3163.

In March 2003, UAZ opened an assembly line in Vietnam. On 20 November, the company produced the last UAZ-31512 and the first UAZ Hunter.

On 17 August 2005, the first UAZ Patriots rolled off the assembly line. They had new suspension, transmission and steering control and became the first brand new models of UAZ since the fall of the Soviet Union. The same year the assembly line had undergone a large-scale modernization. The company signed contracts with foreign suppliers and used a significant number of foreign components in its newest vehicles.

In 2006, UAZ opened a new control and test section of the main assembly line and presented 4 new cars at the Moscow International Automobile Salon.

In the following years UAZ introduced a number of additional options and improvements in its vehicles, such as the better heating and ventilation of the passenger compartment, engine cooling system, together with Lukoil introduced a new line of motor oils for its cars, offered Iveco diesel engines and launched the UAZ Cargo, a light commercial truck based on the UAZ Patriot.

In 2012, the Patriot and the Pickup received a new engine, ZMZ Euro-4 with European on-board diagnostics, which became the first Russian diesel engine to meet the Euro-4 Standard published in 1998. 2013 was the banner year for UAZ, with export sales increasing by 37% since 2012. The next year the sales of the Patriot rose by 10%, and the company was visited by Premier Dmitry Medvedev.

During a test drive in 2014, a UAZ Patriot crossed winter roads and frozen tundra of the Sakha Republic and reached one of the northernmost Russian ports at Tiksi, being the first car to cross the 73rd parallel north moving under its own power.

In January 2015, the sales increased by 3%. A UAZ Patriot support vehicle took part in the 2015 Dakar Rally, crossing the route of 9,295 km through Bolivia, Chile and Peru. The company finished the production of special series of UAZ Hunters, which were to be replaced by newer models; these Hunters were a limited edition and had airbrushed artistic paintings on them commemorating the 70th anniversary of the victory in World War II. In August the UAZ Patriot received new upgrades, including new paint colors, 18-inch wheels, interiors, frameless wiper blades, etc. The same year UAZ trucks were present at the Moscow Off-Road Show 2015, Interpolitech-2015 and ComTrans-2015 exhibitions.

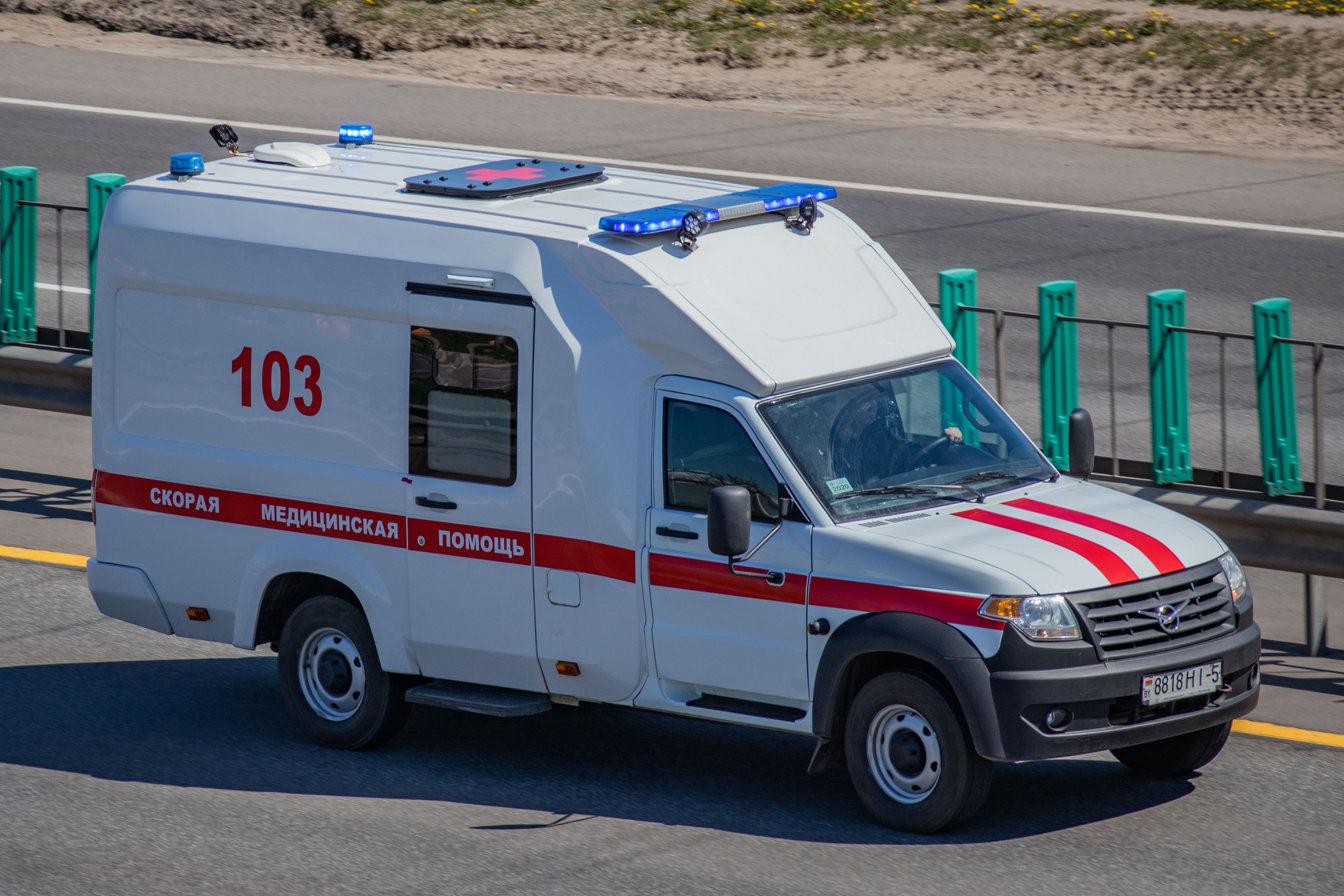
An ambulance based on a UAZ Profi.

UAZ delisted from the Moscow Exchange in July 2015.

In May 2023, Izvestia reported that UAZ would shortly launch knock down production of vehicles in Cuba, as a result of negotiations between Russian and Cuban enterprises. Service centers for the repair and maintenance of these vehicles would also be set up in the country. The Cuban side of the delegation was reportedly the most interested in UAZ Profi delivery vehicles, as well as ambulances based on the UAZ Classic. The first batch of machine kits will go to Cuba in July–August 2023. UAZ further stated that vehicle production would increase by 2,000 units, as well as increase employee wages by 12%.

In June 2023, UAZ announced plans to launch a limited anniversary edition of the UAZ Classic.

== Models ==
=== Current ===
Current lineup of UAZ vehicles:

==== SUVs ====
- UAZ Hunter (UAZ-315195, 2003–present)
- UAZ Patriot (UAZ-3163, 2005–present)
  - UAZ Pickup – pickup version
  - UAZ Cargo – truck version
  - UAZ Profi – truck version
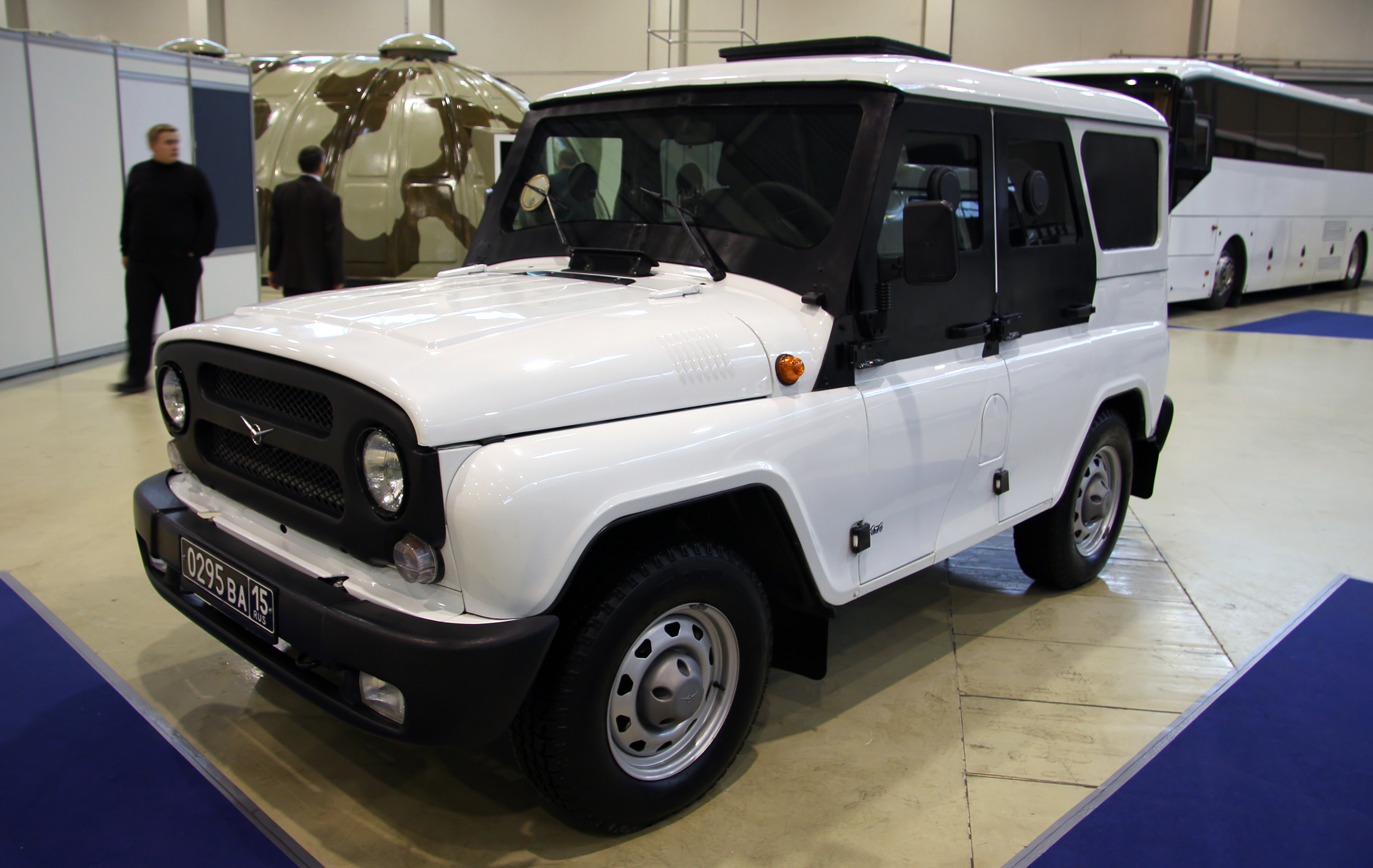
UAZ Hunter (2003–present)

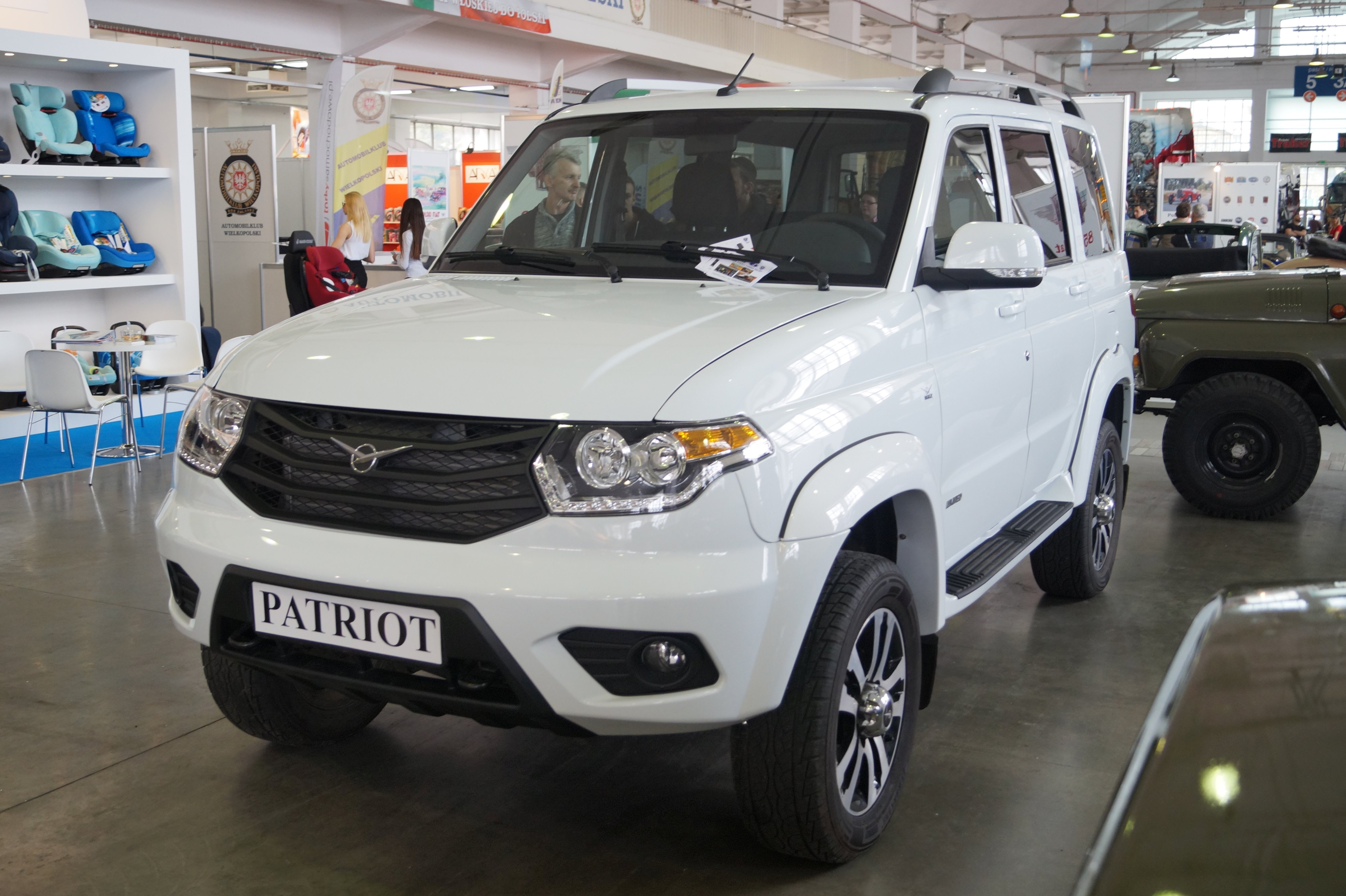
UAZ Patriot (2005–present)

==== Minibuses ====
- UAZ-452/UAZ-3741 (1965–present)
  - UAZ-451 – truck version
  - UAZ 452D/UAZ-3303 – truck version
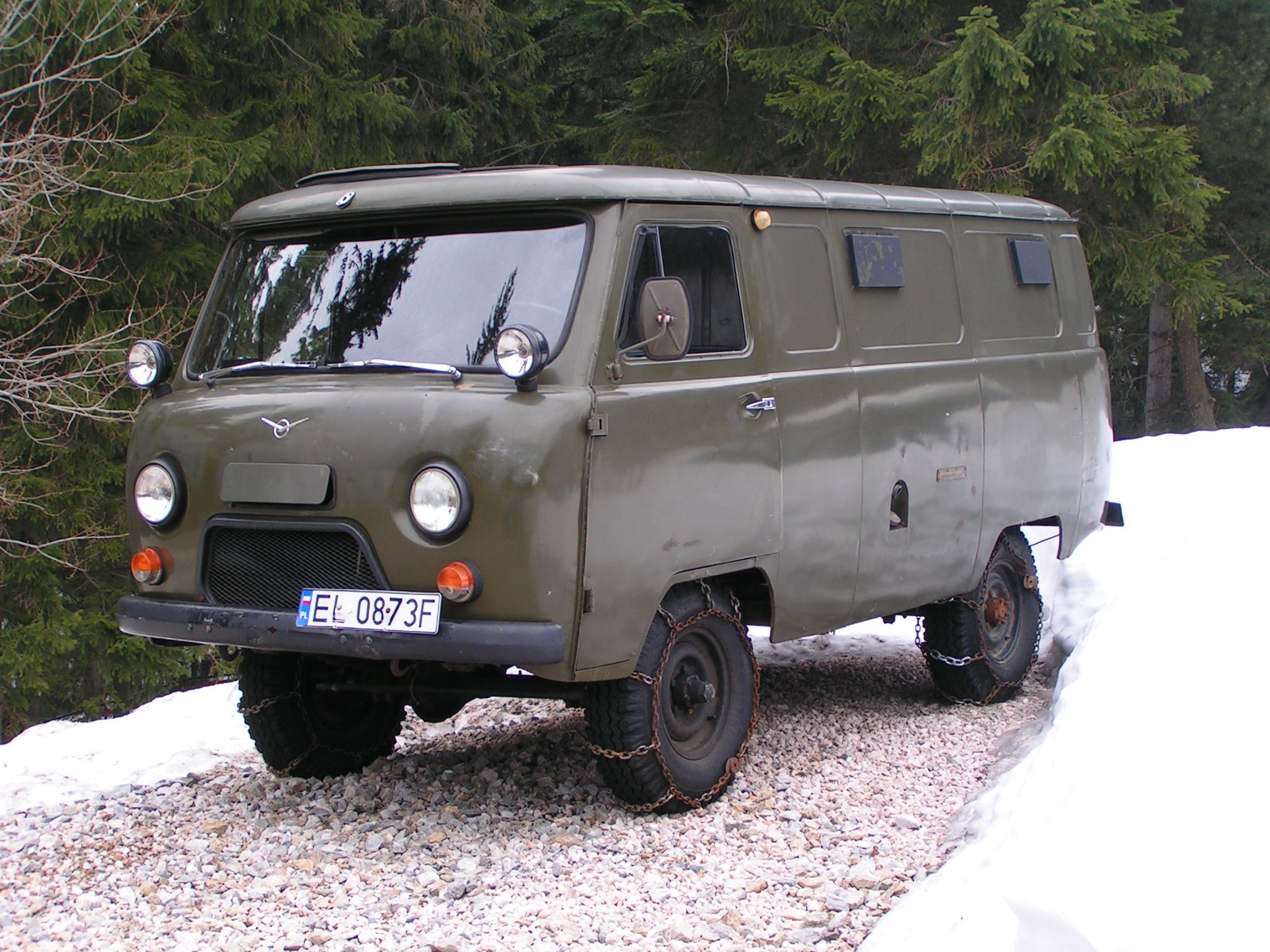
UAZ-452/UAZ-3742 (1965–present)

=== Past models ===
==== SUVs ====
- UAZ-469/UAZ-3151 (1971–2005)
  - UAZ-469B/UAZ-31512 – civilian version
  - UAZ-31514 – metal roofed version
  - UAZ-3153 – long wheelbase version
- UAZ-3160 (1997–1999)
- UAZ Simbir (UAZ-3162, 2000–2004)
  - UAZ-2360 – truck version
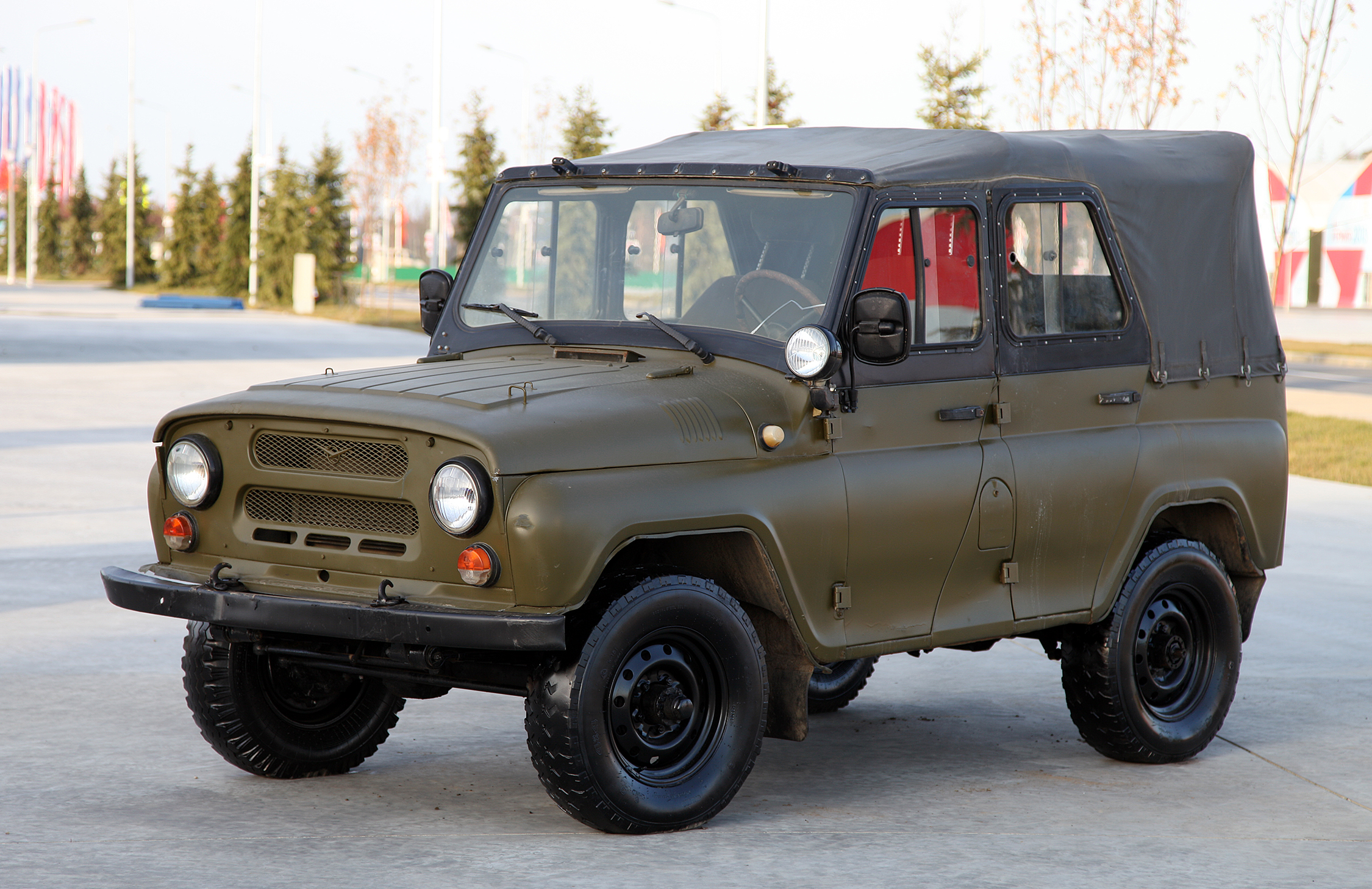
UAZ-469/UAZ-3151 (1971–2005)

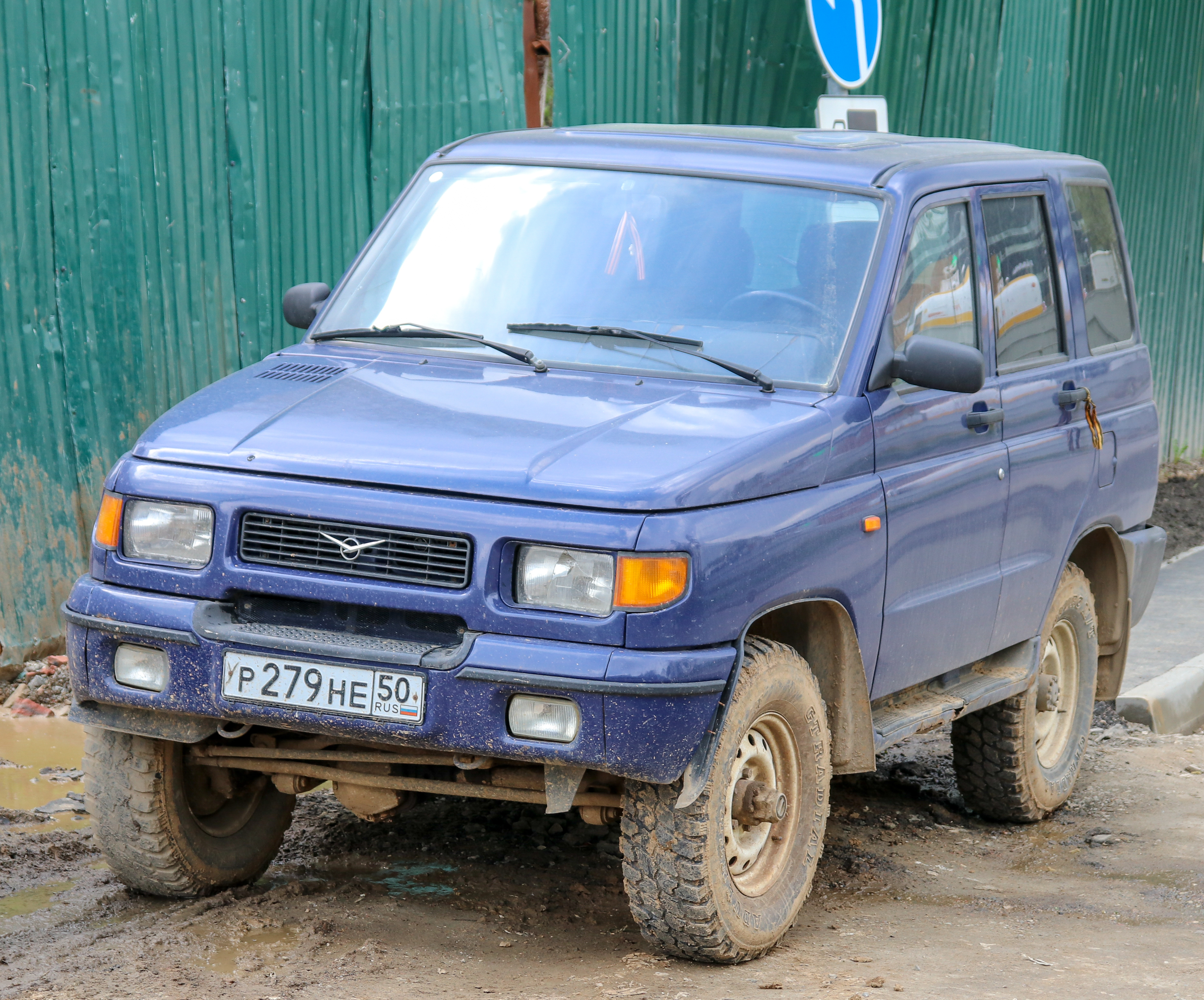
UAZ-3160 (1997–1999)

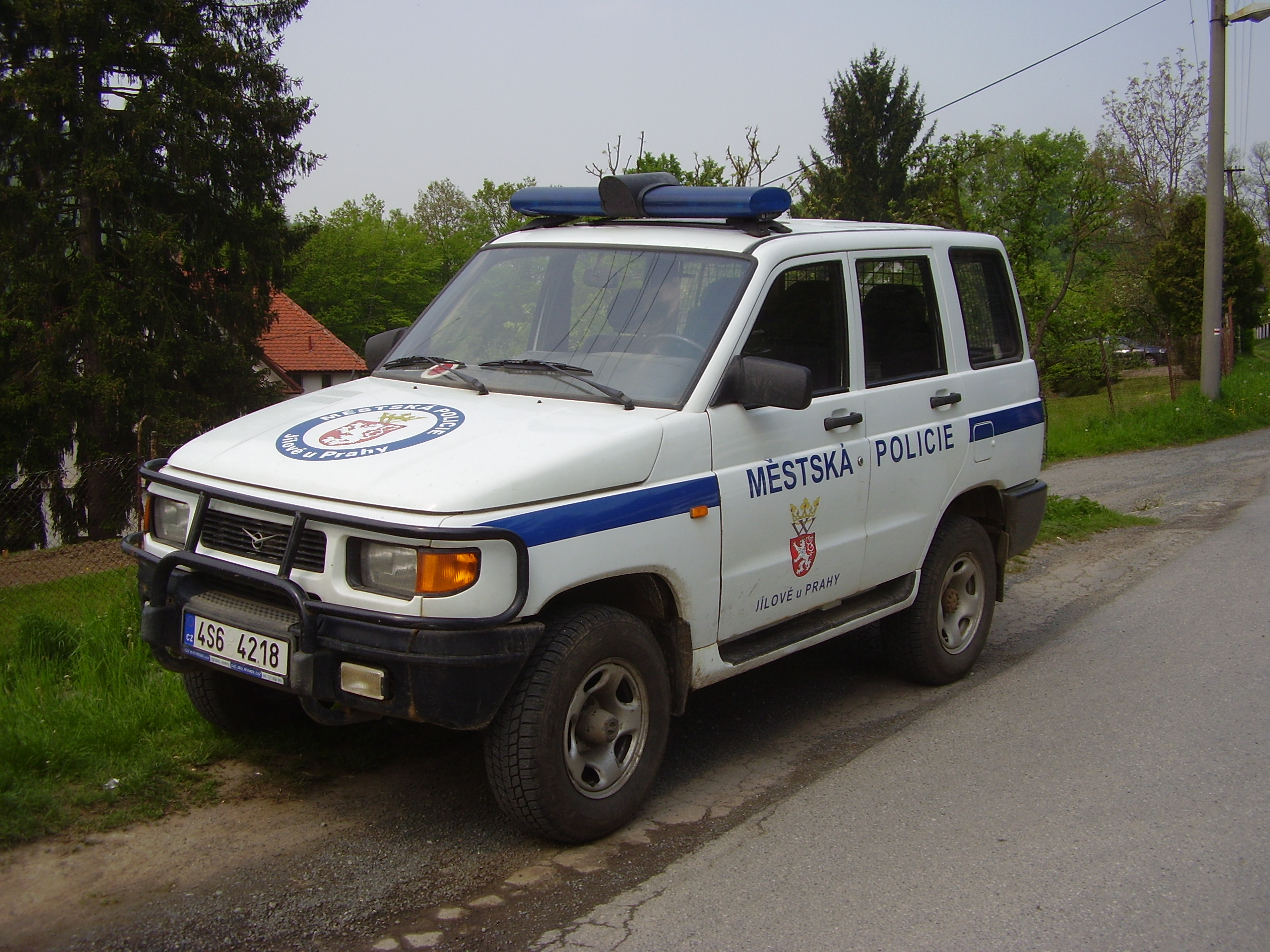
UAZ Simbir (2000–2004)

==== Minibuses ====
- UAZ-450 (1958–1965)
  - UAZ-450D – truck version
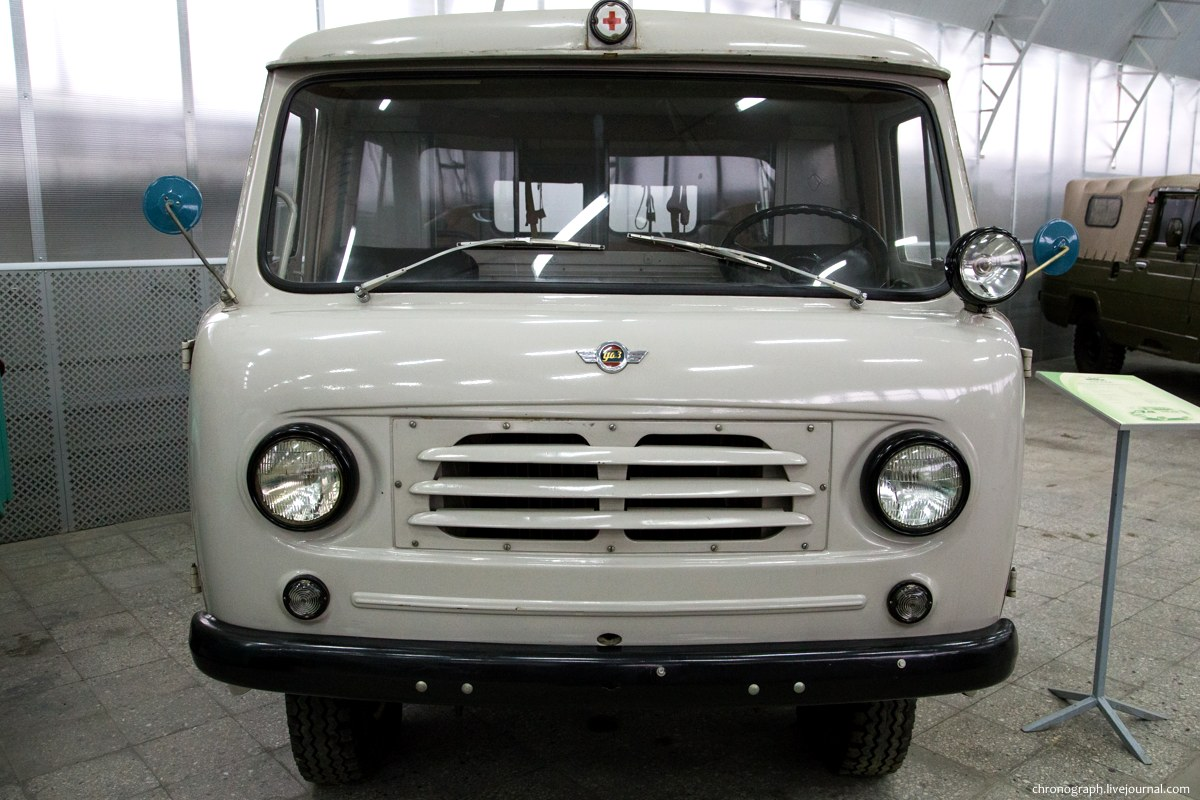
UAZ-450 (1958–1965)

=== Prototypes ===
- UAZ-3907 Jaguar – amphibious car (1976)
- UAZ-3171 – SUV (1989)
- UAZ Simba (UAZ-3165) – minivan (1999)
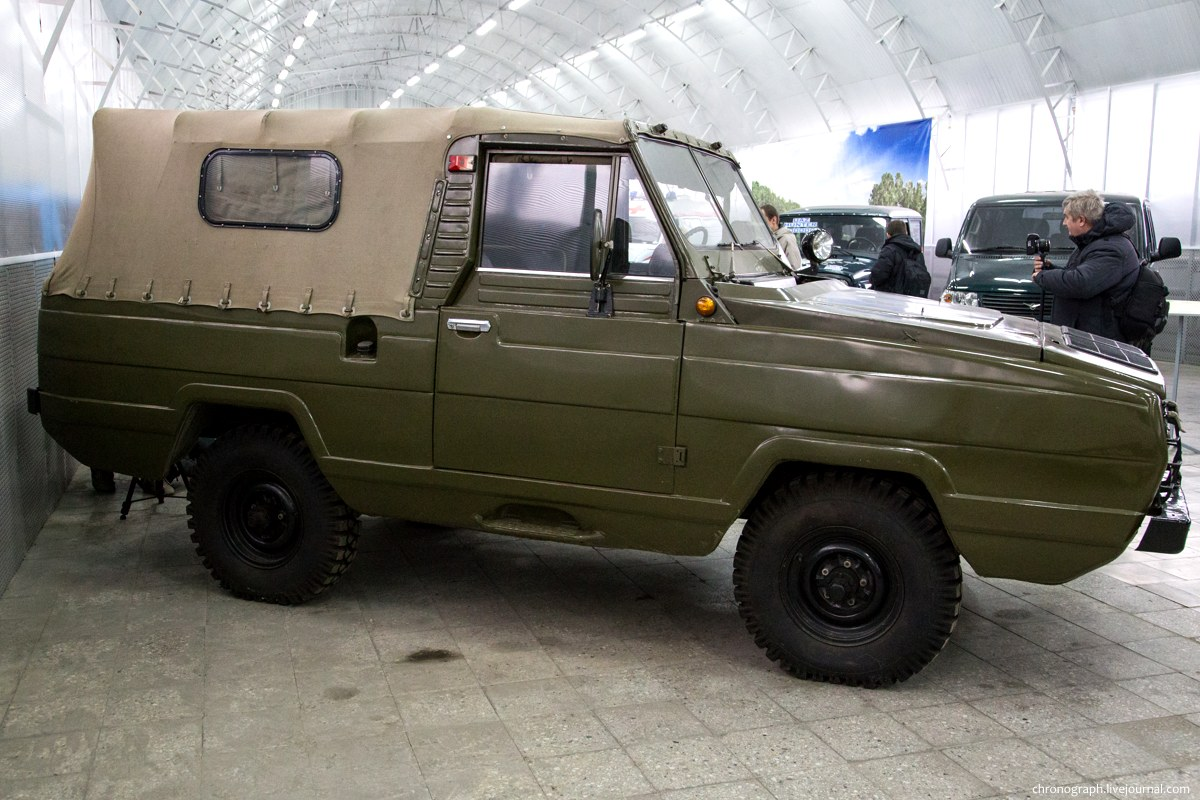
UAZ-3907 Jaguar (1976)

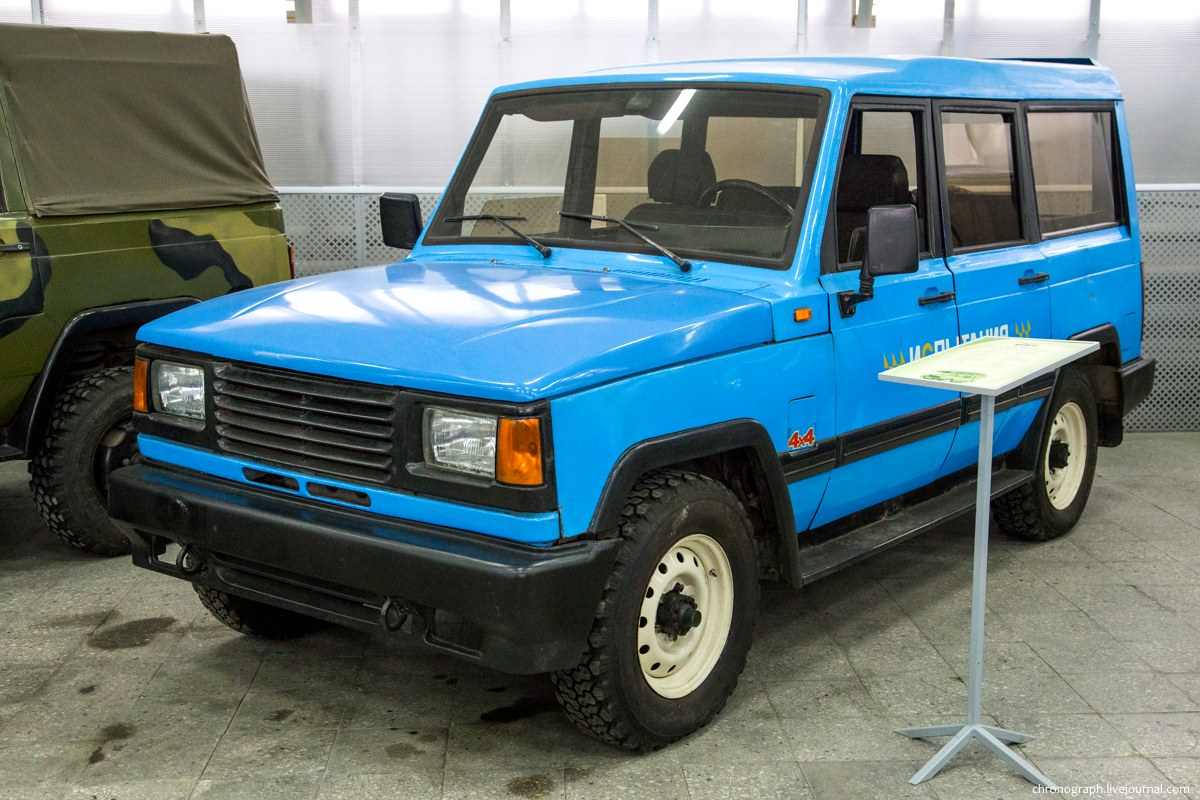
UAZ-3171 (1989)

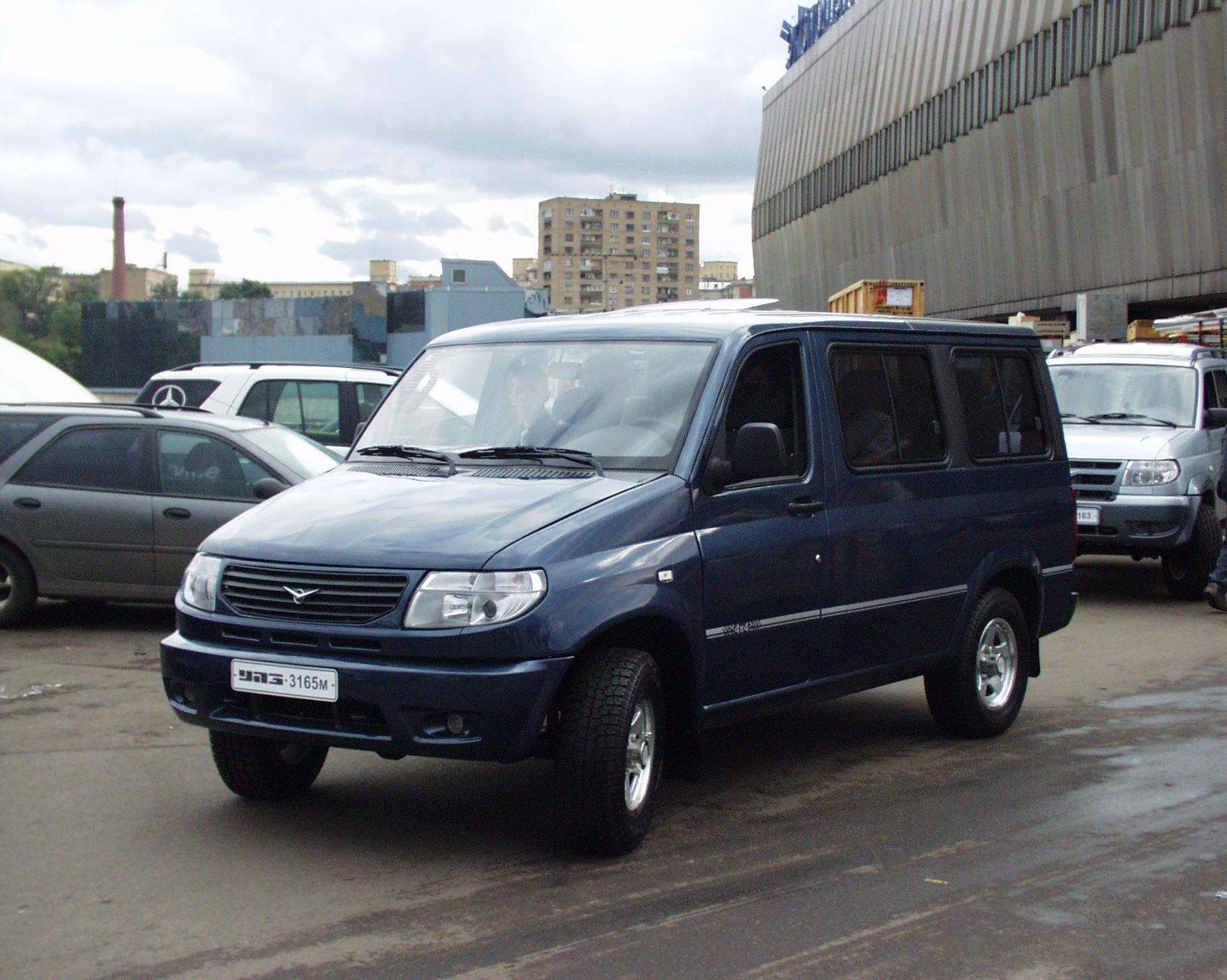
UAZ Simba (1999)

== See also ==
- TREKOL-39294 – A Russian six-wheeled amphibious all-terrain vehicle manufactured using UAZ and GAZ products
- Automobile model numbering system in the Soviet Union and Russia
