= TREKOL-39294 =

Motor vehicle

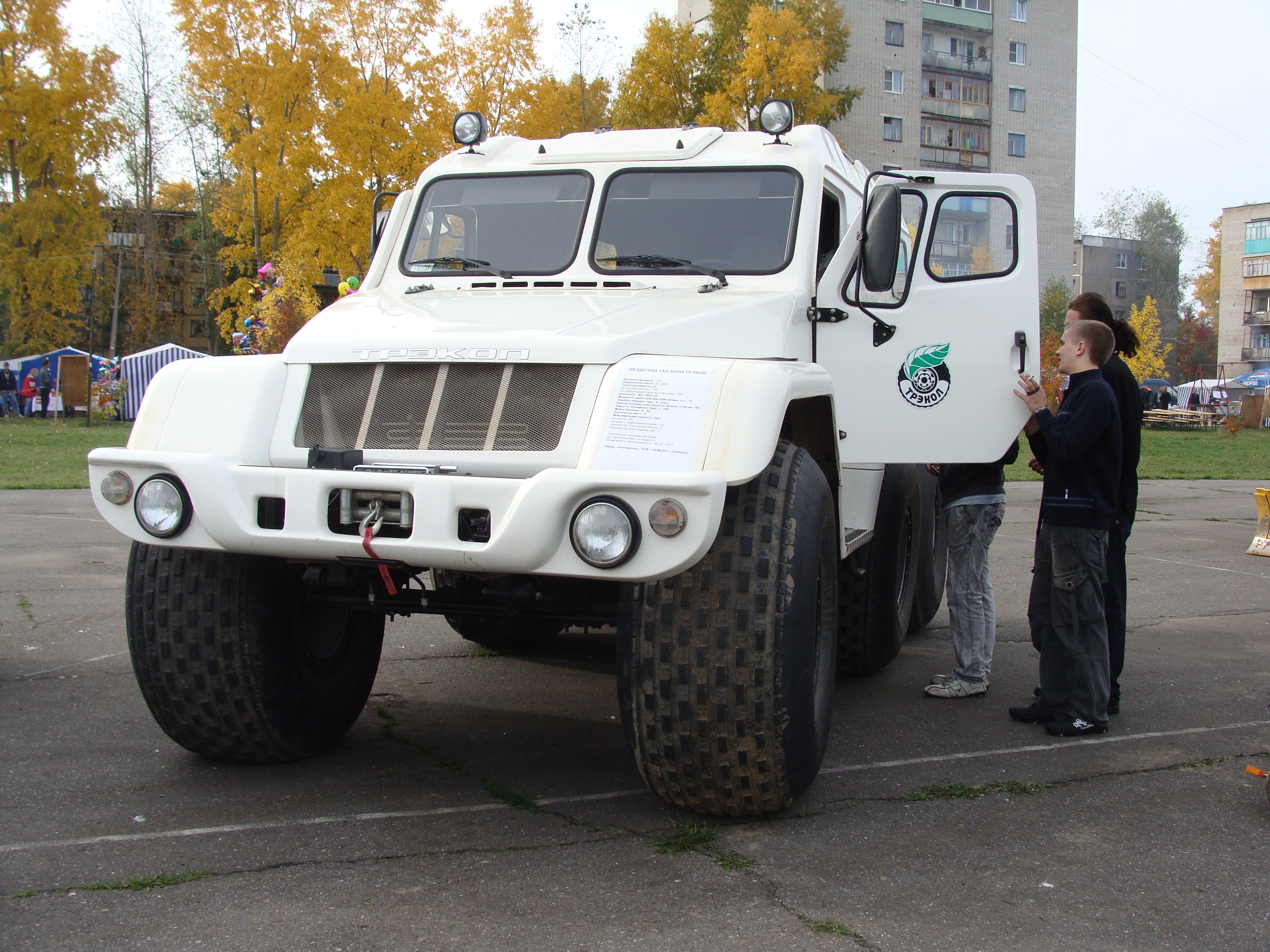
The TREKOL-39294

The TREKOL-39294 is a Russian six-wheeled amphibious all-terrain vehicle produced by TREKOL. The 39294 is available in two versions, passenger and freight, and it uses large low-pressure tires. TREKOL manufactures the 39294 using UAZ and GAZ parts, which they say ensures easy operation, easy maintenance and repairs. The fiberglass body has a very low thermal conductivity and the possibility of operating at a temperature of −45 °C to 45 °C. The vehicle has a capacity, in the passenger models, for up to 8 people. It has a maximum speed of 70 km/h (43 mph). All-terrain vehicles may be equipped with petrol or diesel engines, as well as a water jet to move through the water.

It is also featured in the game SnowRunner, renamed as the Yar 87.

== Specifications ==
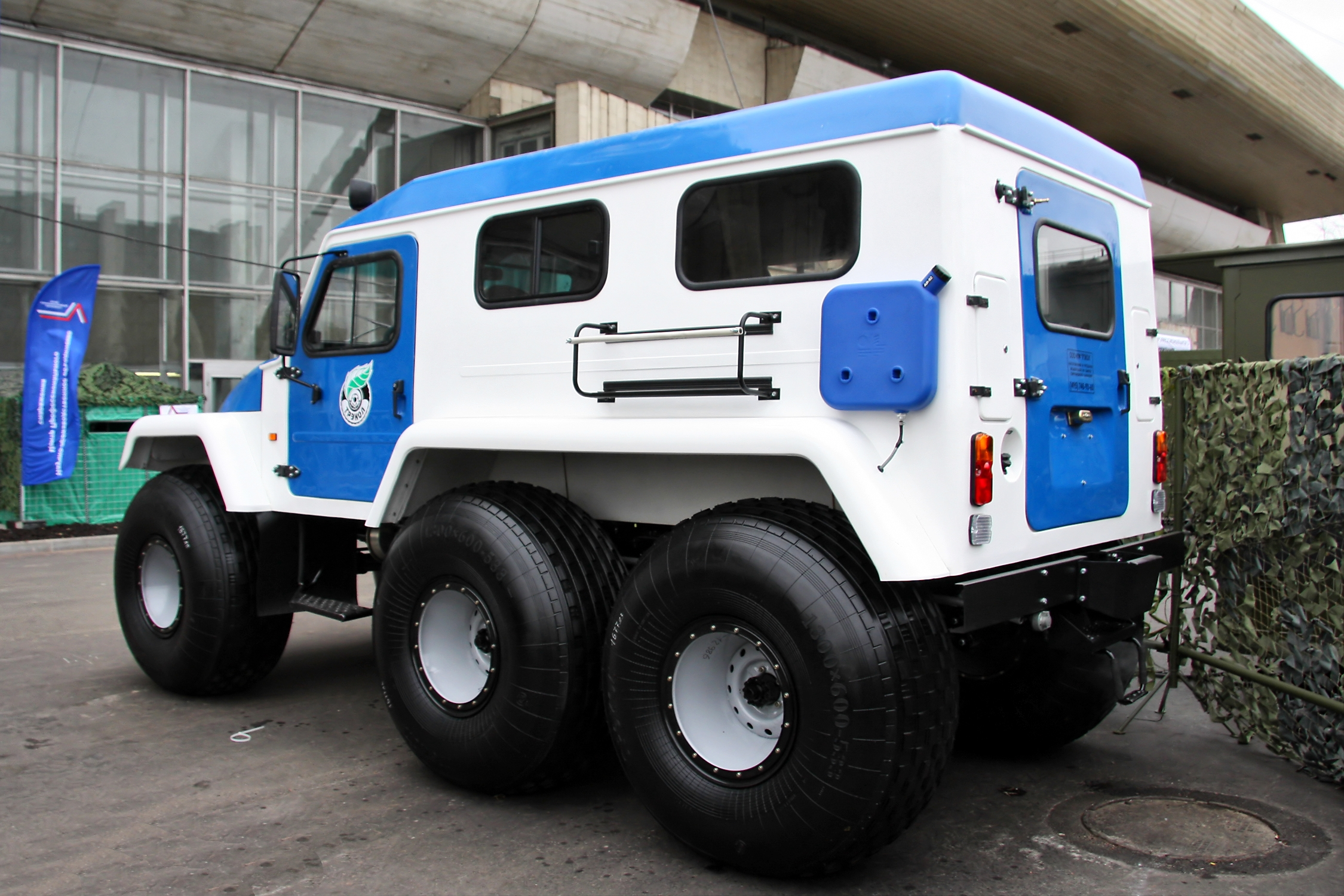
TREKOL left rear 3/4 view

- Axles: 6 × 6;
- Curb weight: 2,800 kg (6,200 lb);
- Load capacity on solid ground: 700 kg (1,500 lb);
- Capacity on soft ground and water: 400 kg (880 lb);
- Overall length/width/height: 5,670 mm (223.2 in)/2,540 mm (100.0 in)/2,715 mm (106.9 in);
- Track: 1,900 mm (74.8 in);
- Ground clearance: 490 mm (19.3 in);
- Engine: gasoline ZMZ-4062.10 (optional - diesel Hyundai D4BF);
- Engine capacity: 2.3 liters;
- Engine power: 66.2 kW (88.8 hp) at 4500 rpm;
- Maximum torque: 172.6 N⋅m (127.3 lb⋅ft) at 2500 rpm;
- Fuel: 92 octane gasoline;
- Fuel consumption at a speed of 50 km/h (31 mph): 14 L/100 km;
- Fuel capacity: 100 L;
- Transmission: 4-speed;
- Transfer case: 2-speed, inter-axle differential with forced locking, power integral type;
- Body: Fiberglass, 3-door.;
- Number of seats: 8;
- The number of heaters in the back of: 1;
- Tires TREKOL: 1300h600-533, tubeless, low pressure;
- Operating pressure in the tire: 10 ... 50 kPa (0.1 ... 0.5 kg / cm ²);
- Minimum pressure of the tires on the ground: 12 kPa (0.12 kg / cm ²);
- The maximum speed on the highway/water: 70 km/h (43 mph)/10 km/h (6 mph) (with outboard motor);
