= TREKOL =

Russian automotive company

- Company type: Limited liability company
- Industry: Automotive
- Headquarters: Lyubertsy, Moscow Region, Russia
- Products: ATVs swamp buggies
- Website: en.trecol.ru

TREKOL (Russian: ТРЭКОЛ) is a Moscow, Russia based designer and manufacturer of large all terrain amphibious vehicles/swamp buggies. Trekol is an abbreviation for «ТРанспорт ЭКОЛогический» or Transport Environmentally. TREKOL is a Limited liability company (Russian: Общество с ограниченной ответственностью (OOO)).

== Products ==
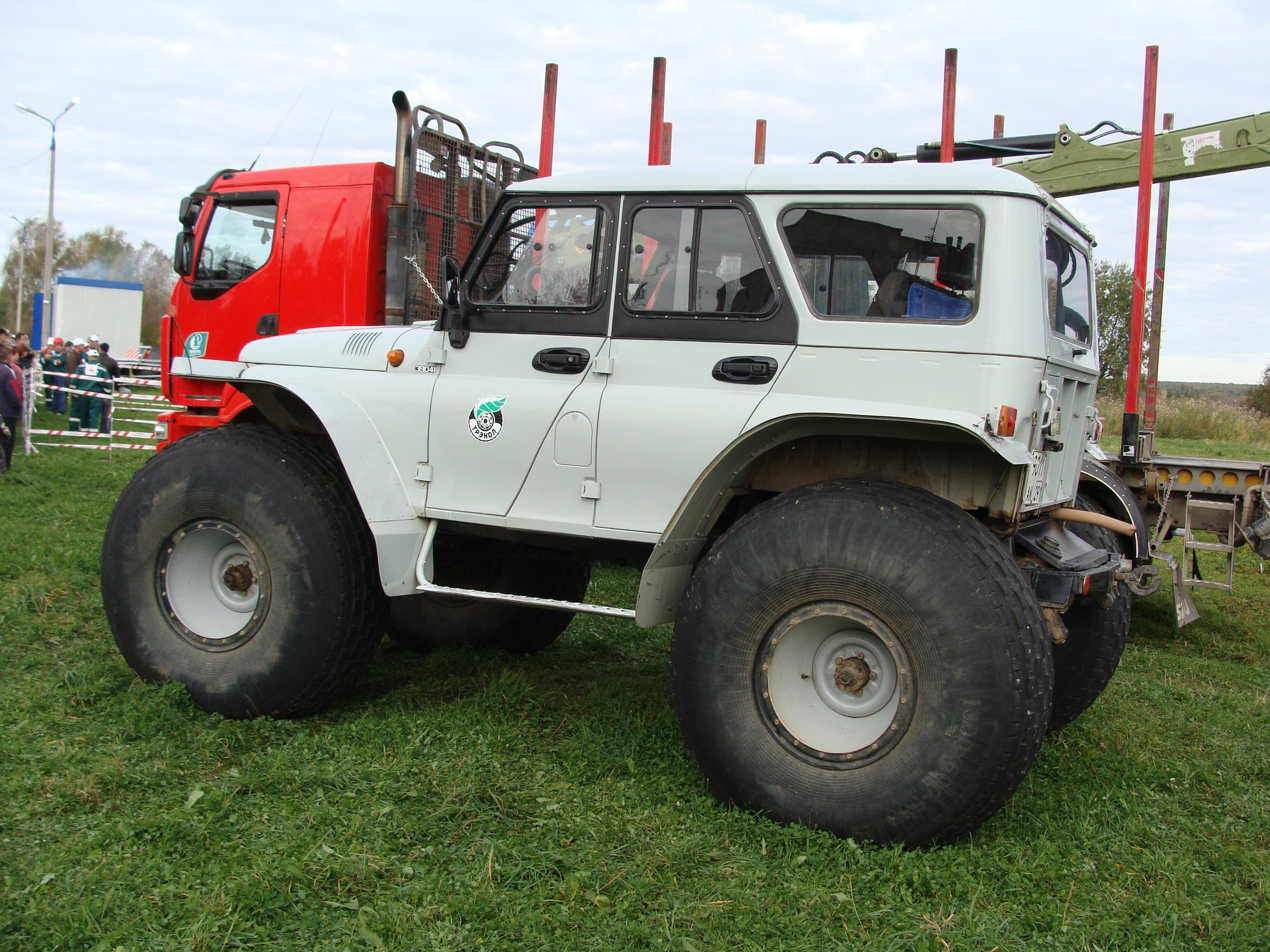
Cross-country vehicle UAZ-39294 «TREKOL 39041»

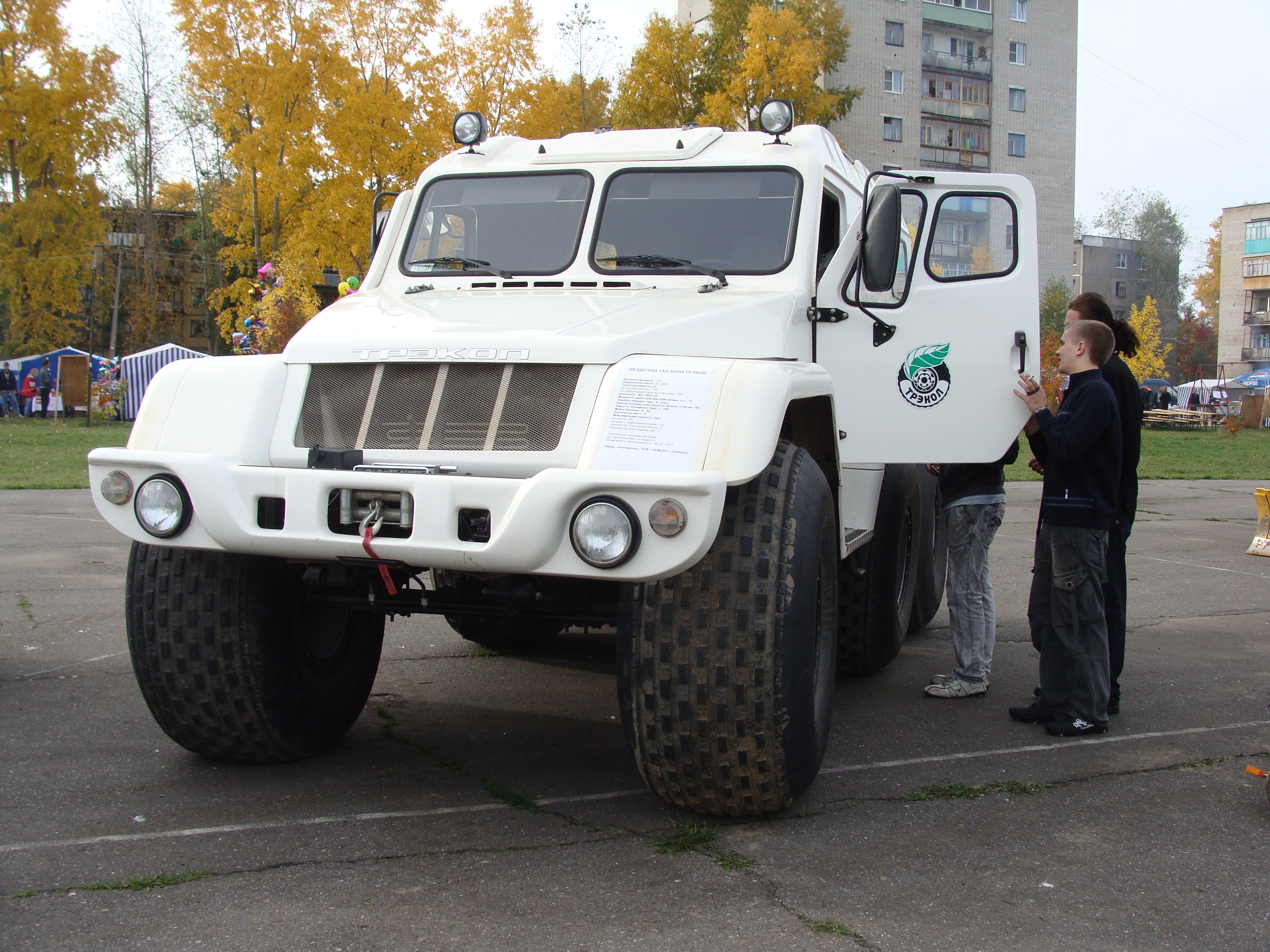
TREKOL 39294

Trekol manufactures the following wheeled ATV's

- TREKOL Trophy - 4x4 based on UAZ 2206
- TREKOL-39294 - 6x6 with a fiberglass body
- TREKOL-39295 -6x6 pickup truck with a fiberglass body
- TREKOL-39041 - 4x4 based on the UAZ-31514
- TREKOL-39445 - fiberglass body 4x4 based on rebodied UAZ Hunter
- TREKOL-39446 - fiberglass body pickup truck variant of 39445
- TREKOL-AGRO - 4x4 fitted with agricultural equipment
- TREKOL-Forester-D (LIGHT) - 4x4 open body
- TREKOL-Woodman - 4x4
- TREKOL Forester-M - large 4x4
- TREKOL Forester-M North - large 4x4 for Arctic use
- TREKOL 8901-trailer - single axle trailer
- TREKOL Ambulance - 6x6 ambulance on 39294 base
