= UAZ Bars =

Motor vehicle

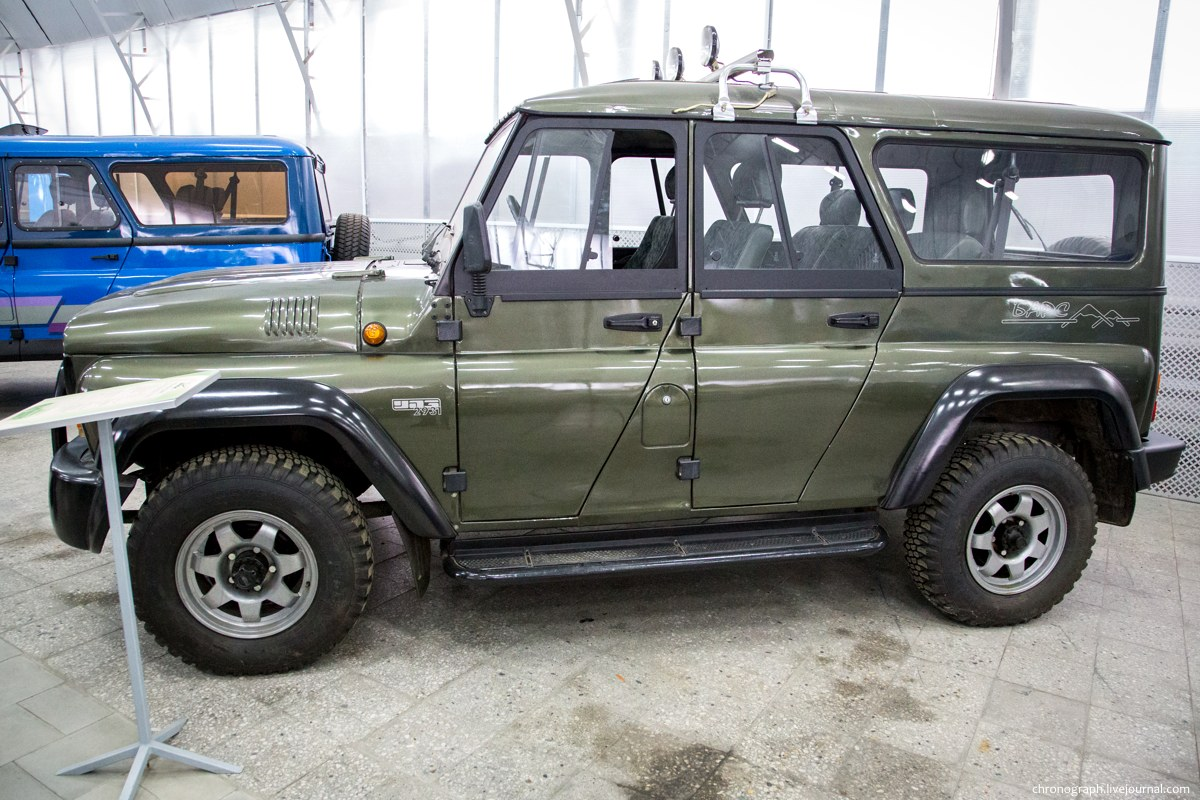
- UAZ Bars in UAZ's Exhibition Pavilion-Museum

Overview
- Manufacturer: UAZ
- Also called: UAZ-3159
- Production: December 1999–2010
- Assembly: Russia: Ulyanovsk

Body and chassis
- Body style: 4-door SUV
- Related: UAZ Hunter

Dimensions
- Wheelbase: 2,760 mm (109 in)
- Length: 4,550 mm (179 in)
- Width: 1,785 mm (70.3 in)

UAZ Bars (Russian: УАЗ Барс, (Note: Барс ("Bars") translates to Leopard.) UAZ-3159) is a Russian SUV produced by UAZ. It was introduced in December 1999. About 10,000 automobiles were produced until 2010. The UAZ Bars is a passenger-utility car with four-wheel drive, developed on the basis of UAZ-3153.

== Overview ==
The Bars is a widetrack (1,890 mm (74 in) versus 1,785 mm (70.3 in)) of the UAZ-3153, and has an extended wheelbase modification of the UAZ-3151, with engine ZMZ-409 with an overall length of 4,550 mm (179 in) and a wheelbase of 2,760 mm (109 in). The Bars has a higher capacity of negotiating gradients, better structural strength, and better steering capacity on roads of different surface quality.

The standard complete equipment has been supplemented with:

- Portal axles
- Hydro amplifier of the steering system;
- 5-speed gear box;
- Fine mesh transfer box.

For the UAZ-3159 Bars, a new range of 16-valve ZMZ-406 engine has been used with electronic controlled fuel injection. The engine design comprises a cast iron cylinder block, two camshafts in the engine head, and a timing chain.
