= UAZ Simbir =

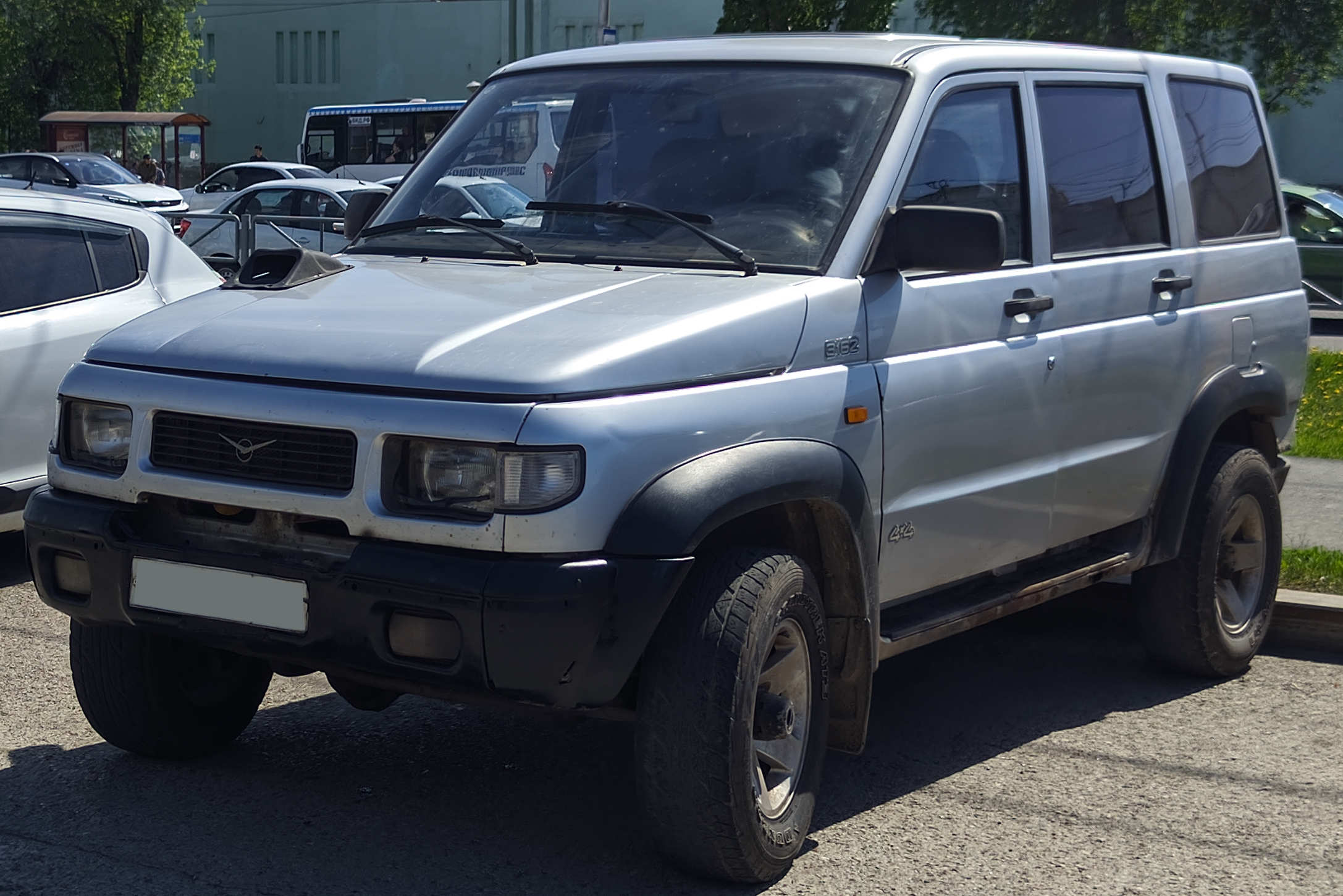

Overview
- Manufacturer: UAZ
- Production: 2000–2005
- Assembly: Russia: Ulyanovsk

Body and chassis
- Class: SUV
- Body style: 5-door wagon (4 or 5 seats)
- Layout: FR layout

Powertrain
- Engine: ЗМЗ (ZMZ)-409.10 gasoline

Dimensions
- Wheelbase: 2,760 mm (109 in)
- Length: 4,630 mm (182 in)
- Width: 2,020 mm (80 in)
- Height: 1,950 mm (77 in)
- Curb weight: 2,040 kg (4,500 lb)

Chronology
- Predecessor: UAZ-469
- Successor: UAZ Patriot

The UAZ Simbir (Russian: Симбир, from Simbirsk, old name for Ulyanovsk), or UAZ-3162, is a model of off-road vehicle produced by the Russian company UAZ between 2000 and 2005. This car is a completely new model in relation to the UAZ-469 and modifications based on it. It is essentially a rebodied extended wheelbase UAZ-3160. On August 5, 1997 the first prototype of the UAZ-3160 rolled off the assembly line. April 27, 2000 saw the first production sample UAZ-3162 Simbir featuring a long wheelbase and new Spicer axles from the UAZ-3160.

In 2003 the car was awarded zero stars out of a possible four by the Russian ARCAP safety assessment program.

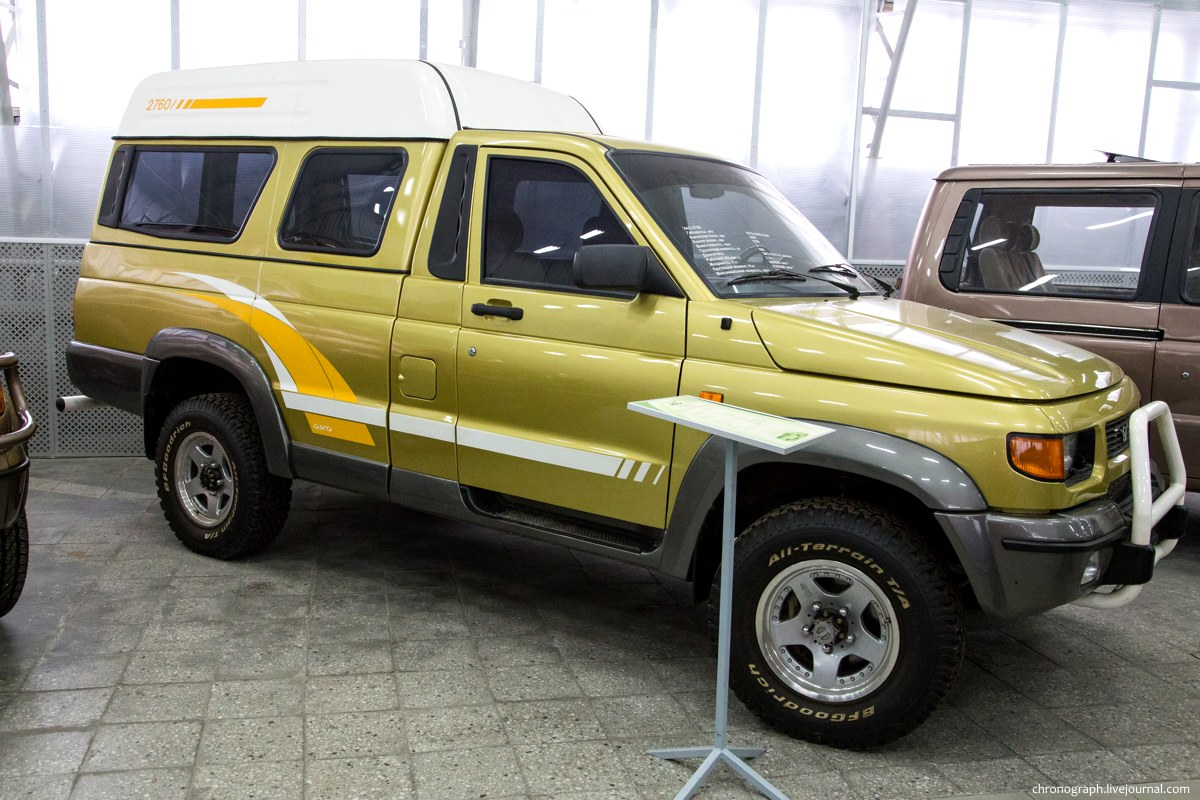
UAZ-2760 "Stalker" pickup with bed cap

The Simbir-based UAZ-2360 pickup truck was produced in small numbers in 2004–2005. The payload was approximately 1,000 kg (2,200 lb).

The Simbir was in production until 2005.

== Description ==
- Layout: permanent all-wheel drive
- Configuration: 4 × 4
- Ground clearance: 210 mm (8.3 in)
- Rear track: 1,445 mm (56.9 in)
- Front track: 1,445 mm (56.9 in)
- Load capacity: 800 kg (1,800 lb)
- Fuel consumption: 10.4 at 90 km/h (56 mph)
