= Emergency gas service =

Emergency gas service (Russian: аварийная газовая служба, Latinized:avariynaya gazovaya sluzhba) is an emergency service in many cities of Russia and some other countries of the former Soviet Union. Similar emergency services exist also in other countries, eg. in Poland (Polish: pogotowie gazowe).

== History ==
The history of service goes back to 20th century during Soviet period. In the USSR, a division was launched within militarized organizations of gas rescuers (included in the general gas rescue service of the chemical industry), non-military (they were a division of the organization) and voluntary. In 1992, due to the abolition of the all-Union ministries, the activities of the Directorate of paramilitary guards and mining and rescue units were discontinued and gas rescue services of enterprises became independent.

The term militarized was encountered in the regulations adopted in 1997. Wearing of uniforms and observance of military discipline were envisaged. The term ceased to be used in 2003.

== Duties ==
Emergency gas service response unit has the following responsibilities:

- promptly identify the circumstances that have developed as a result of an emergency;
- take immediate steps to determine the cause of an emergency and take measures for their elimination or localization.

The EGS may perform the following preventive actions free of charge:

- check the density of gas pipelines, gas appliances and devices using gas at the operating pressure;
- repackaging flange and threaded joints and shut-off devices with replacement of sealing materials.
- elimination of gas leaks, including the carrying out of rehabilitation works on the gas supply system,
- verification of compliance with the installation of gas appliances and equipment, construction of premises, laying gas pipelines building code requirements, design and operating rules;
- checking the flue and air ducts for the presence of thrust;
- check the availability of free access to gas pipelines, gas appliances and devices, as well as in basements and attics, where the pipelines are laid;
- verification of the suitability for use (operation) of gas appliances and devices and disable devices that are not suitable for use.

== When to notify EGS ==
- Odor of gas
- Reduced or increased gas pressure
- Sudden gas shutoff or cut on gas to gas appliances in without warning by employees
- Operation of gas appliances in one area interferes with the operation of gas appliances in another area
- Any explosion or fire.

== Phone number ==
The emergency telephone number is 04 or 104 depending on location.

== Vehicle ==
Russian EGS vehicles are painted in accordance with GOST R 50574-2002 (ГОСТ Р 50574-2002 г) which requires an overall lemon-yellow with contrasting red doors, red bumpers, red front and rear vertical stripes and red horizontal side stripes.

They may be fitted with blue lights and sirens.

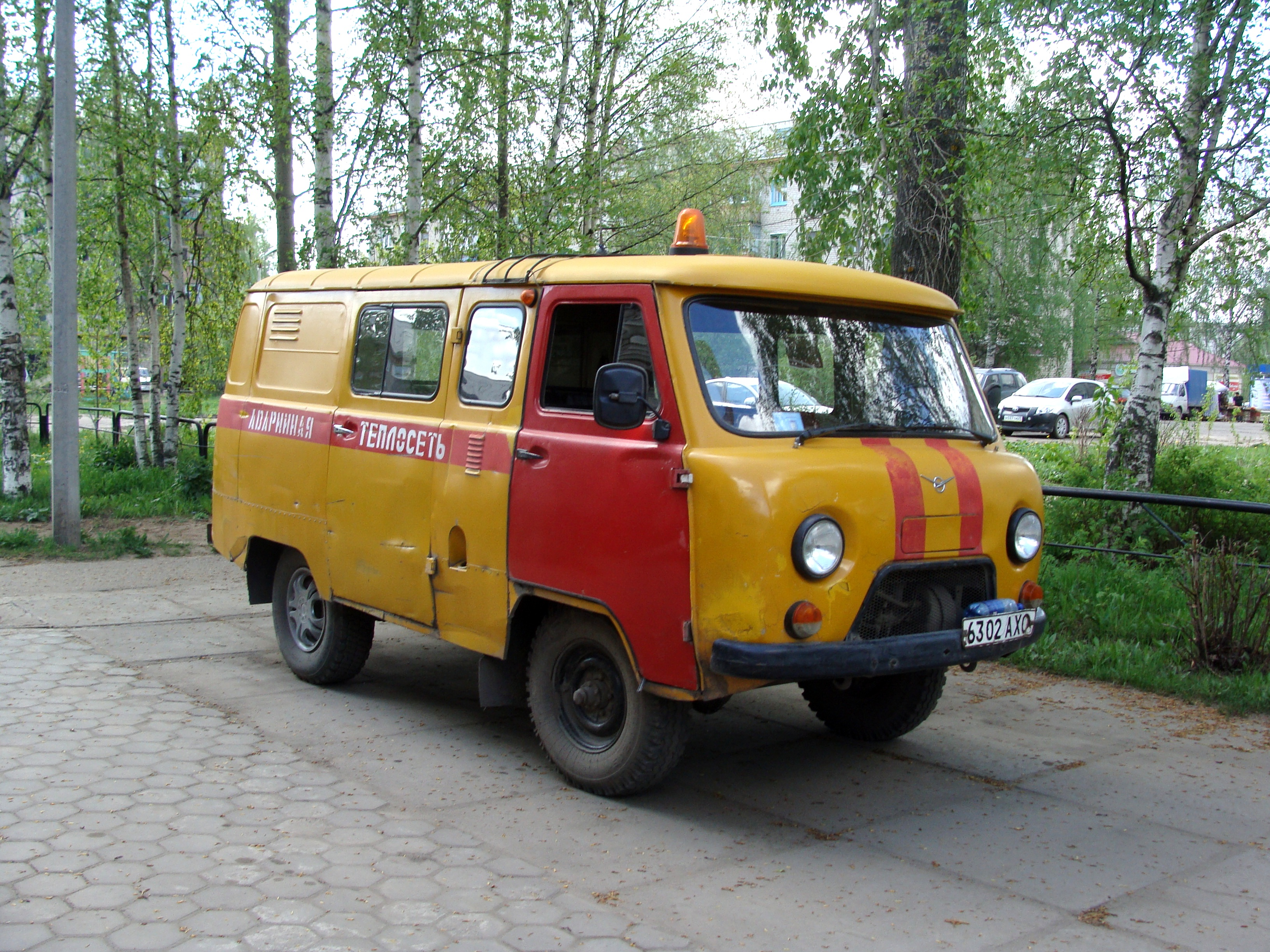
Emergency gas service UAZ-3909

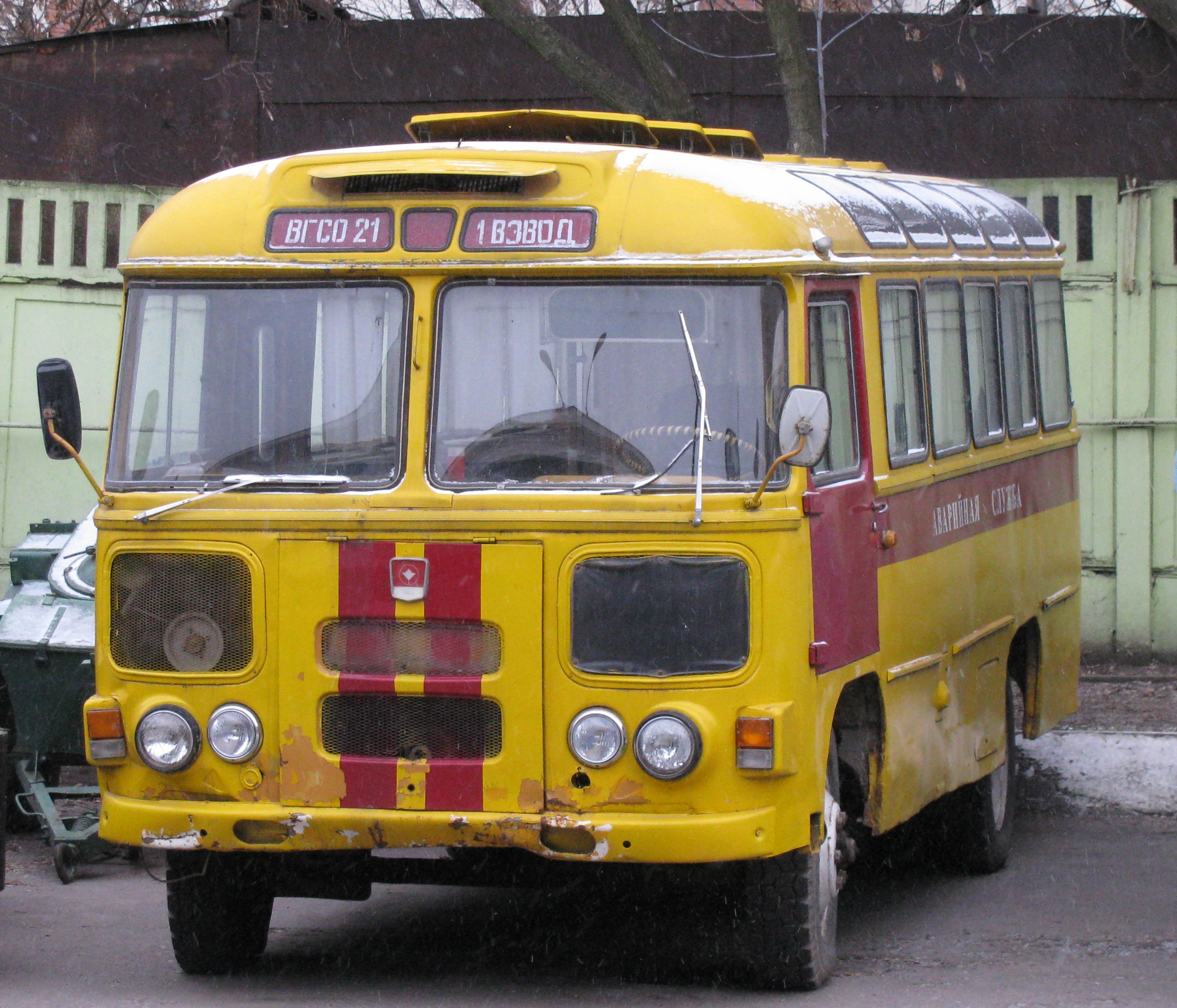
PAZ-672 Command Bus in Moscow

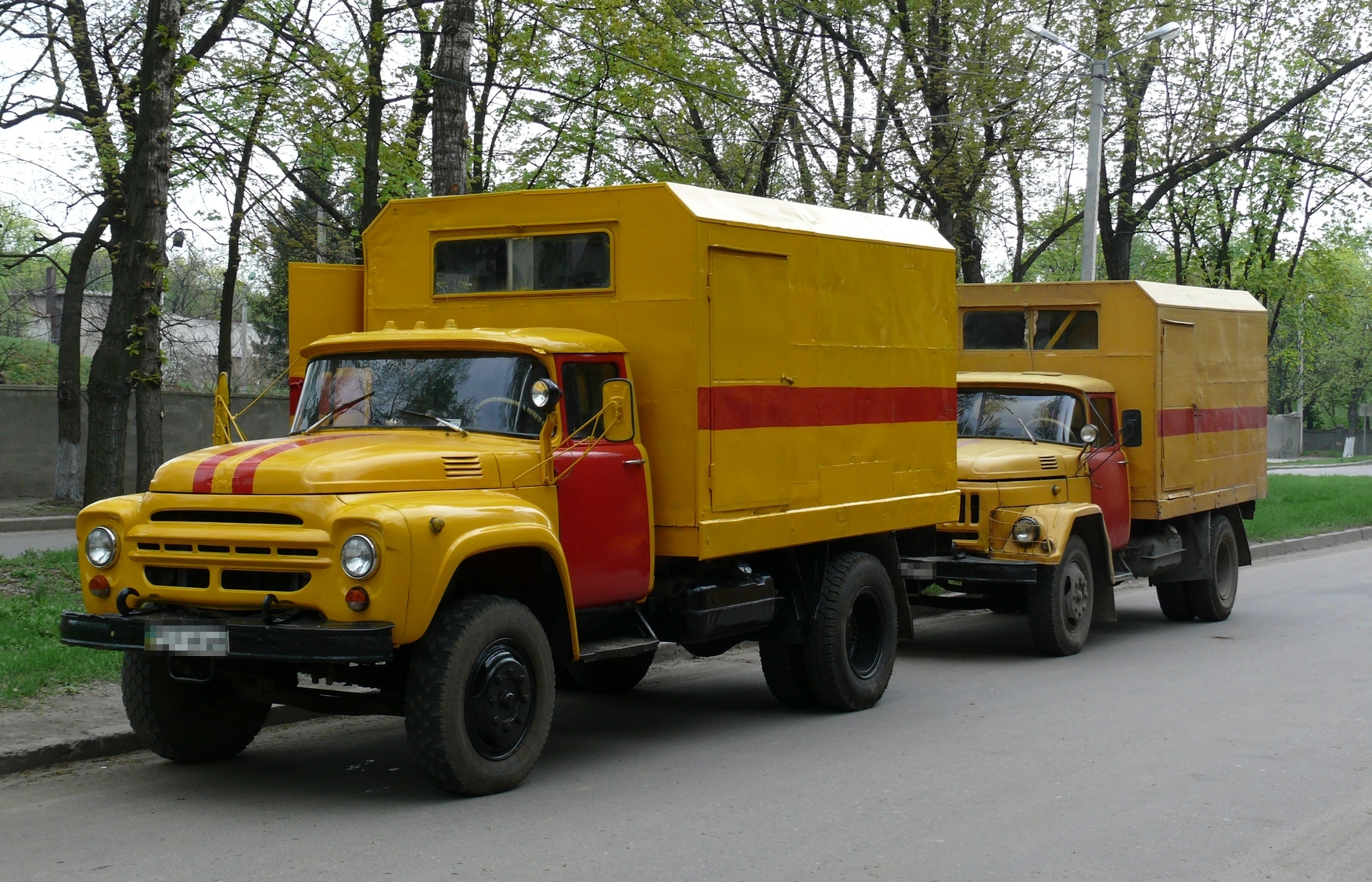
Two ZIL-130's of Ukrainian emergency gas service. The second one has a ZIL-131 cabin

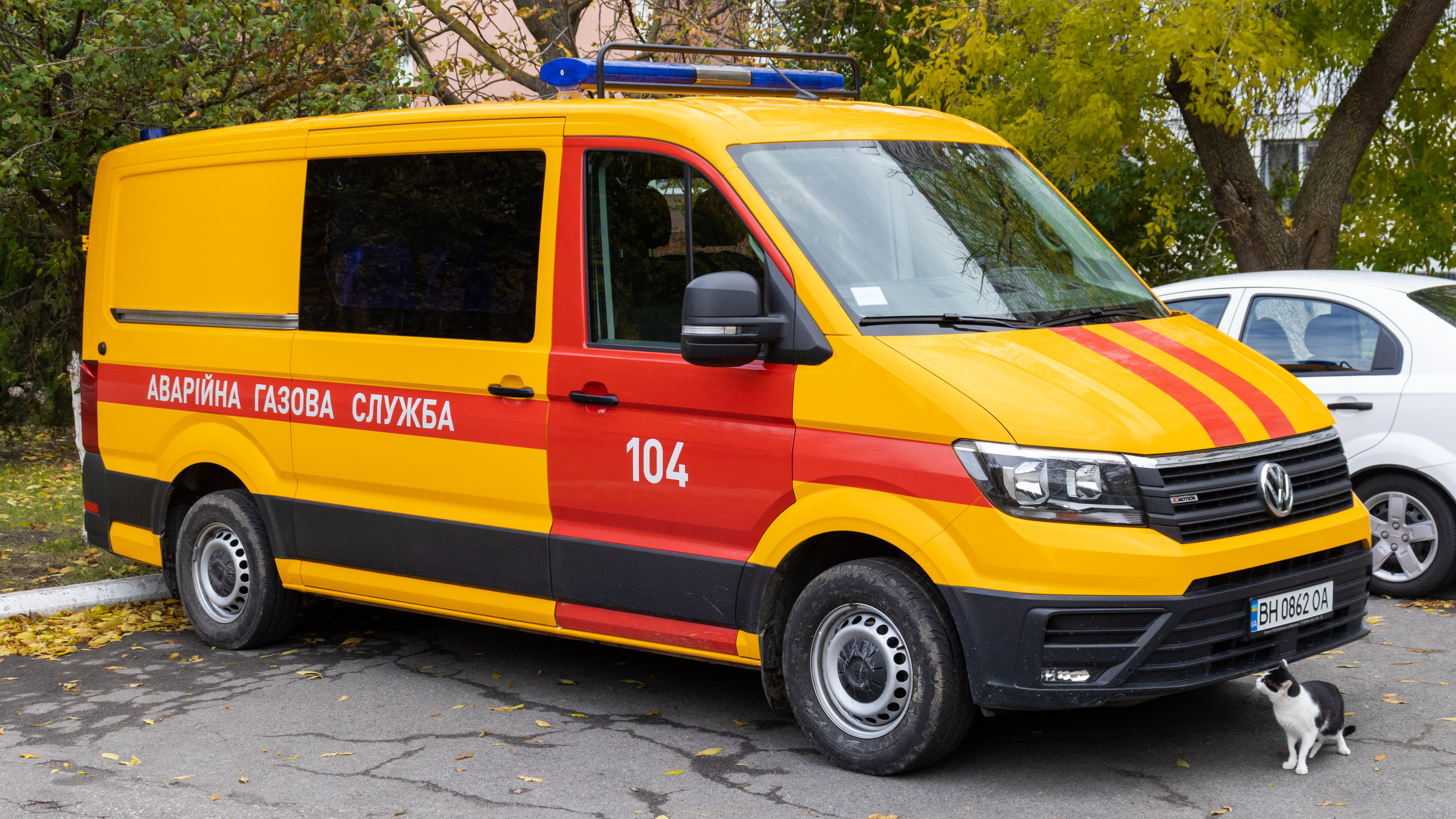
Volkswagen Crafter of the emergency gas service in Izmail, Ukraine

== See also ==
- Russian System of Disaster Management
- Search and rescue in Russia
