= Civil defense in Russia =

Civil defense in Russia is the system of measures to protect people and material assets in the Russian Federation in the event of hostilities, natural disasters or technological disasters, as well as the preparation of such measures. These measures include sheltering, evacuation, disguising facilities, first aid and basic residents.

The procedure for organizing civil defense is enshrined in the federal laws On Civil Defense (1998), On Protection against Emergencies of Natural and Technogenic Character (1994) and On Emergency and Rescue Services (1995).

== History ==
For the first time, civil defense events in Russia began to be held during the First World War. The advent of aviation and chemical weapons contributed to striking economic and infrastructure facilities located behind enemy lines. Often, the bombing of cities was carried out in order to intimidate and demoralize the population. Therefore, the military command of the army and authorities began to develop and carry out measures to protect the population from the dangers arising from the conduct of hostilities. They consisted in conducting blackouts, informing the population, communicating to the population the rules of conduct in case of an air attack or the use of chemical warfare agents, providing medical assistance, providing the population with personal protective equipment, fighting fires, equipping shelters, etc. These events were held in large cities of the Russian Empire: Petrograd, Odessa, Sevastopol, Warsaw, Minsk, Riga, Grodno, Bialystok, Brest, Tallinn. At the state level, civil defense measures were first held during the repulsion of the German attack on Petrograd in February - March 1918. On March 3, 1918, the Committee of Revolutionary Defense of Petrograd appealed to the population of Petrograd and its environs, where they brought to them the basic requirements of air defense and chemical protection.

After the end of World War I, civil defense measures were further improved. As a state system, Civil Defense dates back to October 4, 1932, when local air defense (MPLA) was formed as part of the country's air defense system. Local Air Defense was a system of measures carried out with local authorities in order to protect the population and economic objects from enemy attacks from the air, eliminate the consequences of its attacks, create normal conditions for the work of industrial enterprises, power plants, transport, etc.

In 1940, as the Main Directorate of the Local Air Defense, it was included in the system of the NKVD-MVD of the USSR.

On July 15, 1961, Resolution of the Central Committee of the CPSU and the Council of Ministers of the USSR No. 639-275 approved the Regulations on Civil Defense of the USSR. The Regulations defined the basic principles of protecting the population from weapons of mass destruction. The main method of protecting the population was its dispersal and evacuation. The plan was to provide shelters in close proximity to the place of work for people remaining in cities after the evacuation and dispersal of the population, that is, workers and employees continuing to work in industrial, transport, energy, communications. At this stage, the leadership of the MPVO-GO was entrusted to the executive bodies of the Councils of Deputies of Working People of Territories, Regions, Cities and Districts. Extinguishing large natural fires in the Moscow Oblast in 1972 required the involvement of significant civil defense forces and means to solve peacetime problems. In this regard, in 1974, the USSR Government adopted a resolution "On the use of non-military civil defense formations in peacetime".

Since 1965, the civil defense took its final organizational form, the headquarters of the civil defense were created at each department, in all cities, large towns, at large enterprises, their work and interaction with the party-state apparatus and military administration were regulated. Regular civil defense exercises began with the civilian population of all ages, from children to senior citizens (such measures have been carried out before, but now they have taken on a universal and regular character).

In 1971, the leadership of the civil defense was assigned to the Ministry of Defense of the Soviet Union, the daily leadership was assigned to the Chief of the Civil Defense Forces (Russian: Начальник войск ГО) who concurrently served as deputy Minister of Defense.

Responsibility for local civil defense was vested in the Councils of Ministers of the Republics of the Soviet Union, executive committees of the Councils of People's Deputies, ministries, departments, organizations and enterprises, whose leaders were heads of civil defense. With them, civil defense headquarters and various services were created.

On July 30, 1987, following the experiences and lessons taken from the handling of the Chernobyl disaster resolution of the Central Committee of the CPSU and the Council of Ministers of the USSR No. 866213 "On measures for a radical restructuring of the civil defense system" was adopted.

In 1990 Resolution of the Council of Ministers of the USSR of November 30, 1990 No. 1201 "Issues related the Association of Rescue Units of the USSR" included units of the USSR emergency rescue forces in the forces involved in eliminating the consequences of natural disasters, accidents, catastrophes and other emergencies.

In 1991 the civil defense forces was moved from the Ministry of Defense to the State Committee of the Russian Federation for Civil Defense, Emergency Situations and Disaster Relief which was reformed in 1994 into the Ministry of Emergency Situations.

== Organization ==
Civil defense in Russia is organized hierarchically from the federal center to specific organizations (enterprises, factories, universities and so on) - the main link in the system. At each level, its own civil defense unit is created:

- Specialized departments in specific organizations (for example, the MOESK mobilization training and civil defense department, the center for civil defense and emergency situations at Moscow State University);
- Special units of local administrations (for example, the department of civil defense and emergency situations of the Serpukhov district of the Moscow region);

territorial centers of civil defense, which are equipped with rescue military units of the Ministry of Emergency Situations (for example, the Department of Civil Protection of Primorsky Territory);

- Special units of federal departments (for example, the department of civil service and mobilization training of the Ministry of Energy of Russia, the department of civil defense of the Ministry of Transport of Russia);
- Ministry of Emergency Situations.

The management of civil defense at various levels is entrusted to the respective leaders - the Russian government, the heads of federal and regional departments, local leaders and heads of organizations. They make basic decisions and bear (except for the government) personal responsibility (criminal and administrative) for conducting civil defense.

Coordination of the work of various forces is entrusted to the regional, inter-regional and federal crisis management centers established in the Ministry of Emergencies.

== See also ==
- Russian System of Disaster Management
- Russian Tsunami Warning System
- Search and rescue in Russia
