= EPRON =

Special-Purpose Underwater Rescue Party
- Экспедиция подводных работ особого назначения (ЭПРОН)
- Flag on EPRON vessels (1929-1935)

Agency overview
- Formed: 1923
- Dissolved: 1942
- Parent agency: Soviet Navy

Pennant of EPRON's rescue diver detachment

Pennant of EPRON's chief

EPRON, Russian: Экспедиция подводных работ особого назначения (ЭПРОН) "Special Expedition for Underwater Works" —Special-Purpose Underwater Rescue Party, was a government agency of the Soviet Union to salvage valuable cargo and equipment from sunken ships and submarines.

== History ==
EPRON was established on 17 December 1923 and was initially under the Joint State Political Directorate (Объединенное государственное политическое управление – ОГПУ) at the Council of People's Commissars. Its first operation was treasure-hunting near Sevastopol for the wreckage of HMS Prince, a steamship sunk by a storm off Balaklava in November 1854 when it was carrying gold from Britain to pay British troops fighting in the Crimea (GBP 200,000). The project team was financed, equipped, trained and managed by Japanese diving specialists, who had become highly experienced through salvaging warships of the Russian Imperial Navy sunk or scuttled during the 1904–1905 Russo-Japanese War. The wreckage was allegedly located but there were no reports of gold being found in the quantities that had been initially deemed.

After that EPRON extended its operations to rescue and salvaging sunken ships, gradually absorbing other diving units (less experienced and/or worse equipped) and creating new ones. In 1929 EPRON became the sole body in the USSR responsible for all kinds of work under water - in marine operations, hydraulic and river engineering, mining, wreckage and derelict logging and utilizing, etc.

In 1931 it was transferred from the OGPU as a department to the People's Commissariat of Communication Routes. In 1936 EPRON was subordinated to NKVT (НКВТ, "Народный Комиссариат Водного Транспорта" - "People's Commissariat (Ministry) of Sea and River Transport"); in 1939 - further to NKMF (НКМФ, "Народный Комиссариат Морского Флота" - "People's Commissariat (Ministry) of the Merchant Navy").

By 1941 EPRON had rescued 36 ships and raised 74 sunken ships with total weight of about 25,000 GRT. In 1941 naval rescue and salvage units were transferred to the Soviet Navy (still under the name EPRON); in 1942 it was renamed the Emergency Rescue Service of the Navy (Аварийно-спасательная служба ВМФ), which became the Search and Emergency Rescue Service of the Navy (поисково-спасательная служба ВМФ) in 1979.

== Notable commanders ==
- Vladimir Yazykov (1923-1924)
- Lev Zakharov-Meyer (1923-1930)
- Photius Krylov (1932-1942)

== See also ==
- Search and rescue in Russia
