= Geophysical Service of the Russian Academy of Sciences =

- Федеральный исследовательский центр «Единая геофизическая служба Российской академии наук»
- Established: 1994 (current form)
- Field of research: Geology, Geophysics, Seismology
- Location: Obninsk, Russia; 55°06′54″N 36°34′10″E
- Affiliations: Russian Academy of Sciences
- Website: www.gsras.ru

Geophysical Service of the Russian Academy of Sciences (Russian: Федеральный исследовательский центр «Единая геофизическая служба Российской академии наук» (ФИЦ ЕГС РАН)) is a research body responsible for geological research.

== History ==
Geophysical Service was established on the basis of Experimental Methodical Expedition of the Joint Institute of Physics of the Earth in accordance with the Decree of the Presidium of the Russian Academy of Sciences No.107 on May 31, 1994, pursuant to Order of the Government of Russia No.444 of May 11, 1993.

== Functions ==
The main activities of service: basic research and applied research in the field of seismology and geophysics, as well as conducting continuous seismic monitoring of the Russian Federation, tsunami warning in the Russian Far East, monitoring volcanic activity in Kamchatka and slow monitoring of geodynamic processes in the crust and ground deformation, carrying out continuous seismic monitoring of the world.

In addition, in comply with the Order of the Government of Russia, Russian Academy of Sciences, the service:

- Together with Federal Service for Hydrometeorology and Environmental Monitoring of Russia, maintains the Russian Tsunami Warning System in the Far East;
- Together with the Ministry of Defence of the Russian Federation (according to Government Resolution dated August 25, 2005, No.537) maintains a Russian objects (nine seismic stations through the Russian Academy of Sciences) of the International Monitoring System, which is created for continuous monitoring of the implementation of the Comprehensive Nuclear-Test-Ban Treaty.
