= Russian Tsunami Warning System =

Emergency warning system in the Russian Far East

Russian tsunami warning system (Russian: Российская система предупреждения о цунами), also known as Russian tsunami warning service (Russian: Российская служба предупреждения о цунами), is a tsunami warning system in the Russian Far East which is operated and maintained by the Geophysical Service of the Russian Academy of Sciences together with the Far Eastern Regional Research Hydrometeorological Institute (Russian: Дальневосточный региональный научно-исследовательский гидрометеорологический институт (ДВНИГМИ)). It is subordinated to the Federal Service for Hydrometeorology and Environmental Monitoring. The Russian tsunami warning system is known under the Russian acronym FP RSCHS-Tsunami (Russian: ФП РСЧС-Цунами).

== History ==
The Russian tsunami warning system development began in 1956 to 1959. This followed the tsunami and damage which occurred during the 1952 Severo-Kurilsk earthquake. After this, a government decree was issued for the organization of a tsunami warning service. Since 1956, the seismic part of the work was carried out by the Yuzhno-Sakhalinsk seismic station.

In 2003, following the creation of the Unified State System for the Prevention and Elimination of Emergency Situations (RSChS; (Russian: РСЧС), the tsunami warning service received the status of a functional subsystem of the unified system with the acronym FP RSChS-Tsunami (Russian: ФП РСЧС-Цунами).

In the second half of 2000, the system began a modernization process which included the deployment of new buoys.

== Operations ==
The Russian tsunami warning system includes a network of seismological stations, a hydrophysical (level) network, tsunami warning centers, and a communication system for tsunami warnings. System components are located in Sovetskaya Gavan, Nevelsk, Rudnaya Pristan, Vladivostok, Nakhodka, Preobrazhenye, Uglegorsk, Poronaysk, Starodubskoye, Kholmsk, Korsakov, Cape Crillon, Yuzhno Kurilsk and Vodopadnaya.

== See also ==
- Search and rescue in Russia
- Civil defense in Russia
- Russian System of Disaster Management
