= MOESK =

Electric power transmission and distribution company

JSC Moscow United Electric Grid Company
- Native name: OAO Московская объединенная электросетевая компания
- Romanized name: OAO Moskovskaya Ovedinennaya Elektrosetevaya Kompaniya
- Company type: Public (OAO)
- Traded as: MCX: MSRS
- Industry: Electricity
- Predecessor: Mosenergo
- Founded: 1 April 2005
- Headquarters: Moscow, Russia
- Key people: Nikolay Shvets (Chairman); Andrey Konovalov(CEO)
- Services: Electricity transmission Electricity distribution
- Revenue: $2.14 billion (2016)
- Operating income: $243 million (2016)
- Net income: $14 million (2016)
- Total assets: $5.05 billion (2016)
- Total equity: $2.57 billion (2016)
- Owner: Rosseti (50.9%)
- Number of employees: 16,014
- Parent: Rosseti
- Website: www.moesk.ru

MOESK (Moscow United Electric Grid Company; former name: Moscow Region Power Grid Company) is an electric power transmission and distribution company operating in the Moscow metropolitan area, Russia. It also provides connection services and installation, repair, and technical maintenance services for electrical equipment.

The company was established as a result of the reorganization of Mosenergo on 1 April 2005. Its original name was the Moscow Region Power Grid Company. The company changed its name to Moscow United Electric Grid Company in June 2006. Its energy facilities include approximately 607 high-voltage feeding centers of 35/110/220 kV, 15,590 kilometres (9,690 mi) of 35-220 kV power lines, 1,408 kilometres (875 mi) of high-voltage cable lines; and 121,145 kilometres (75,276 mi) of distribution electric grids. The company is based in Moscow, the Russian Federation.It is a subsidiary of Holding IDGC.

The company attendance territory equals 47,000 square kilometres (18,000 sq mi) with a population of around 17 million people.
