= UAZ-452 =

Russian transport van

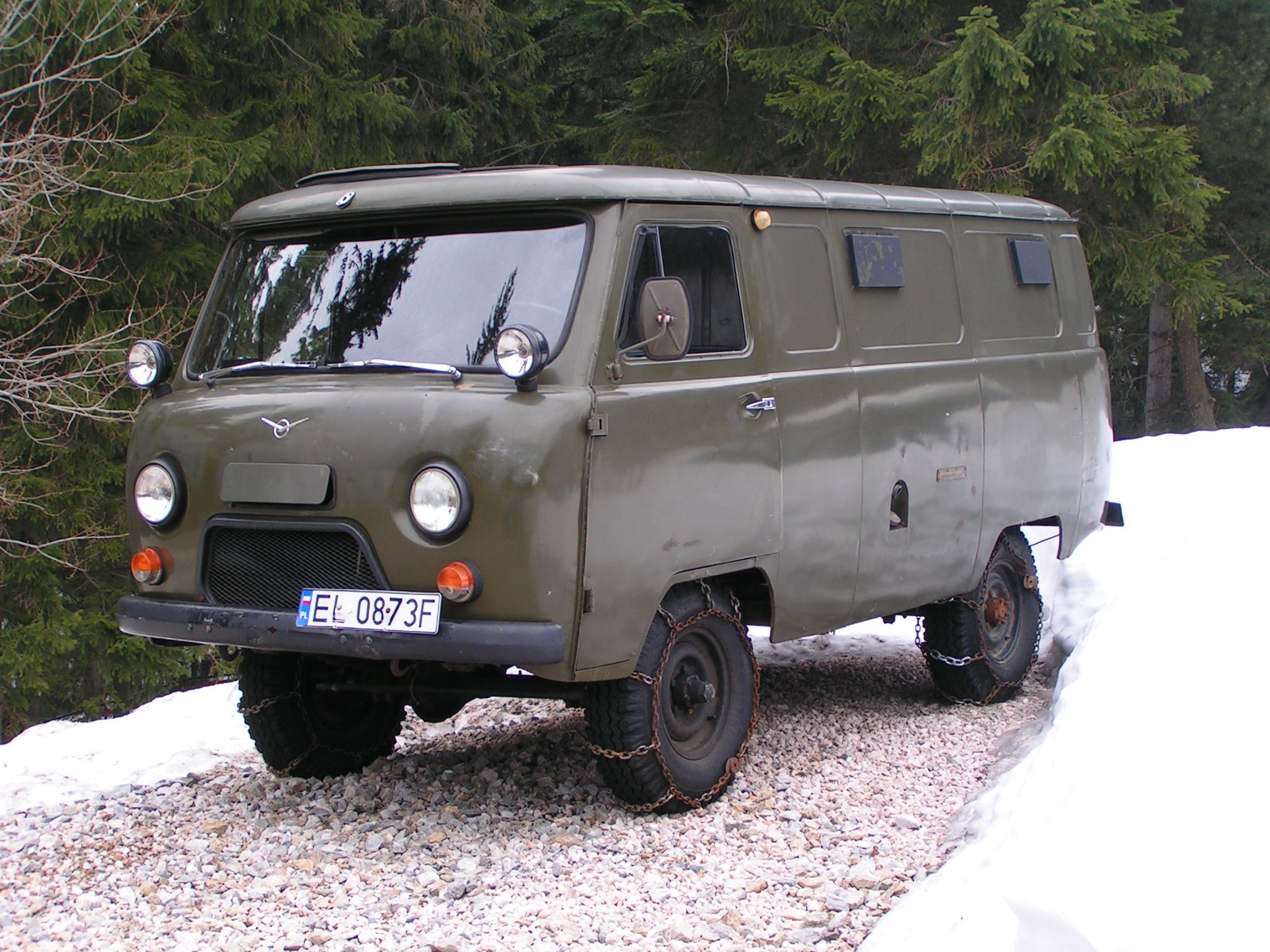
- 1985 UAZ-3741 in Poland

Overview
- Manufacturer: UAZ
- Also called: UAZ-450 (1958–1965); UAZ-452 (1965–1985); UAZ-2206 (minibus); UAZ-3303 (pickup); UAZ-3741 (van); UAZ-3909 (combi); UAZ-3962 (ambulance)
- Production: 1958–present
- Assembly: Soviet Union / Russia: Ulyanovsk
- Designer: Vladimir Ariamov

Body and chassis
- Class: Off-road vehicle
- Layout: Front-engine, four-wheel drive

Powertrain
- Engine: 2432 cc UAZ-450 petrol I4 (1958–1965); 2445 cc UMZ-452 petrol I4
- Transmission: 3-speed manual 4-speed manual 5-speed manual

Dimensions
- Wheelbase: 2,300 mm (90.6 in)
- Length: 4,360 mm (171.7 in)
- Width: 1,940 mm (76.4 in)
- Height: 2,090 mm (82.3 in)
- Kerb weight: 1,760 kg (3,880 lb)

Chronology
- Successor: UAZ Simba (cancelled)

The UAZ-452 is a family of four wheel drive off-road vans and light trucks with body-on-frame construction and cab over engine design, built by the Ulyanovsk Automobile Plant (UAZ) since 1965, with similar earlier families UAZ-450 and UAZ-451 built from 1958 to 1965 and 1961 to 1982 respectively. Originally designed for the Soviet Armed Forces, since 1985 the vans received updates, with more modern engines and internationally compliant lighting, at the same time the lineup received new four-digit model numbers according to the new Soviet standards for vehicle indices set in 1966. From 2010s, all UAZ-452 variants are collectively referred to by UAZ as SGR (СГР - Старый Грузовой Ряд, "old commercial lineup"). The UAZ-452 has been popularly and widely known as "Bukhanka" (буханка, loaf) after its resemblance to a loaf of rye bread; from summer 2026 onward, it became the vehicle's actual official name.

== Overview ==
The original UAZ-450 (produced between 1958 and 1965), was based on the chassis and engine of the four-wheel drive light truck GAZ-69, and was the first "forward control" vehicle of this type to be built in Russia or anywhere else in the Soviet Union. The UAZ-450 was lightly revised and simplified, resulting in the UAZ-452. Because of the external similarities to a loaf of bread, the van became known as Буханка (bukhanka, or 'loaf' in Russian). The ambulance version was nicknamed Таблетка (tabletka, a pill). The van is produced in several modifications, with the main difference being the body type (e.g. UAZ-3741 van (known as bukhanka), or the UAZ-3303 pickup truck, which is known as golovastik, tadpole).

The body of the van is normally equipped with two front doors, a single-wing door on the right side and a double-wing door at the rear, although the exact configuration can vary depending on the specific modification. Notable in the van are the fuel ports on the left and the right side of the van, leading to two separate fuel tanks.

The engine, placed between the driver and the passenger seats, was the same 75 hp (55 kW) 2.4-litre (2,445 cc) UMZ-452MI inline-four as the UAZ-469, and was able to run on gasoline of as low as 72 octane (76 was preferred).

As of 2024, it is the oldest vehicle design in production.

== History ==
In 1954 the Ministry of the Automotive Industry of the Soviet Union ordered the Design and Experimental Department of UAZ to develop a light offroad freight vehicle for army in short terms. For the base were taken the chassis of GAZ-69 which was assembled at the factory at the time. After the debate with the specialists of NAMI it was decided to choose the cab-over-engine design. The first prototype was designed by Vladimir Ariamov, it had a large front grille inserted into a stylized front mask and the roof was beveled towards the rear. For its black-and-white paint job the van was nicknamed soroka, magpie in Russian. The van was tested across Karakum Desert, Pamir Mountains, Kazakhstan and Oymyakon. In further development the vehicle was modified by Evgeny Starostin and Lev Shemarin, the grille became smaller to simplify the assembly process and the roof was straightened to fit two sets of stretchers as a military ambulance. The final design was finished by Shemarin several hours before it was scheduled to be sent to Moscow for approval.

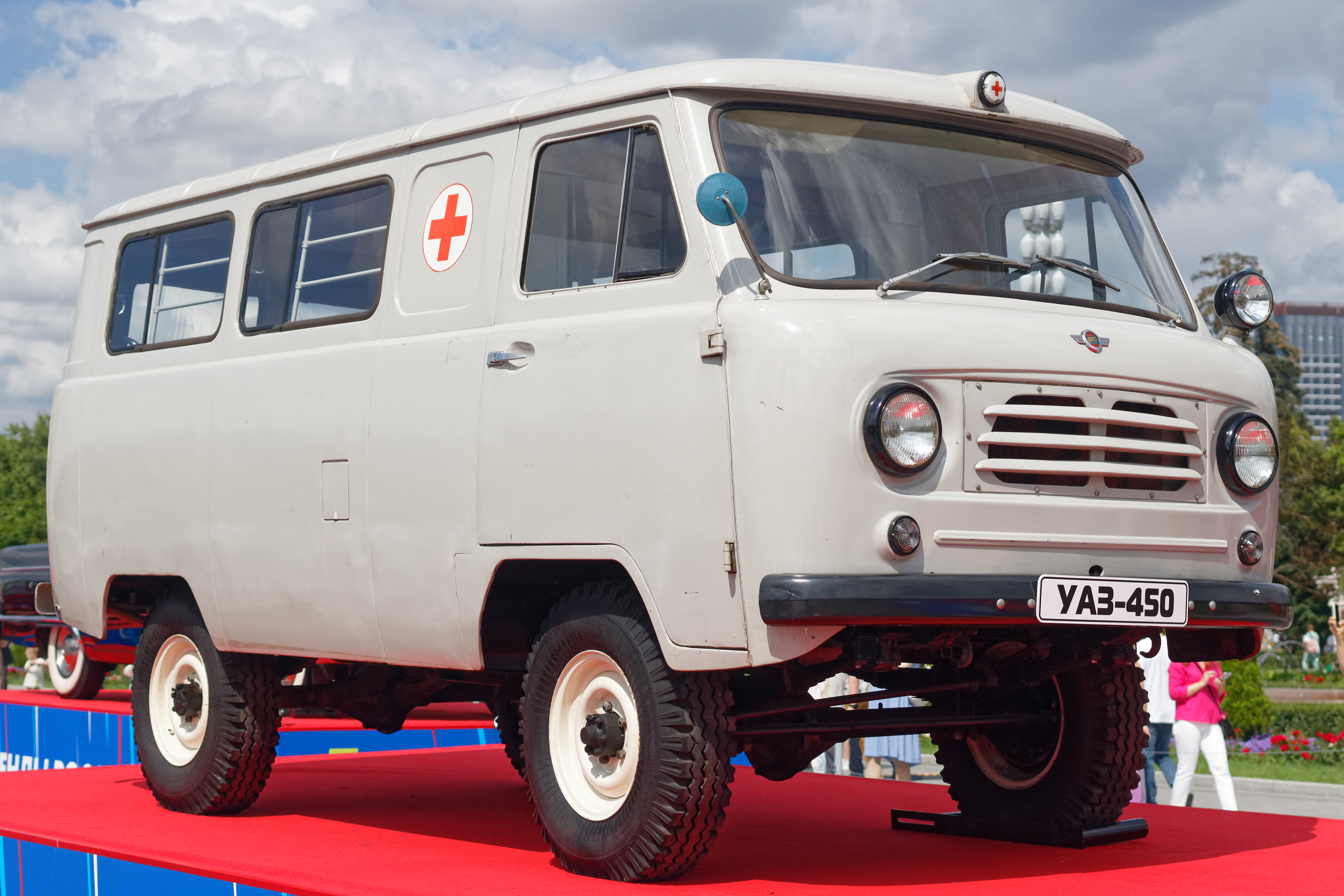

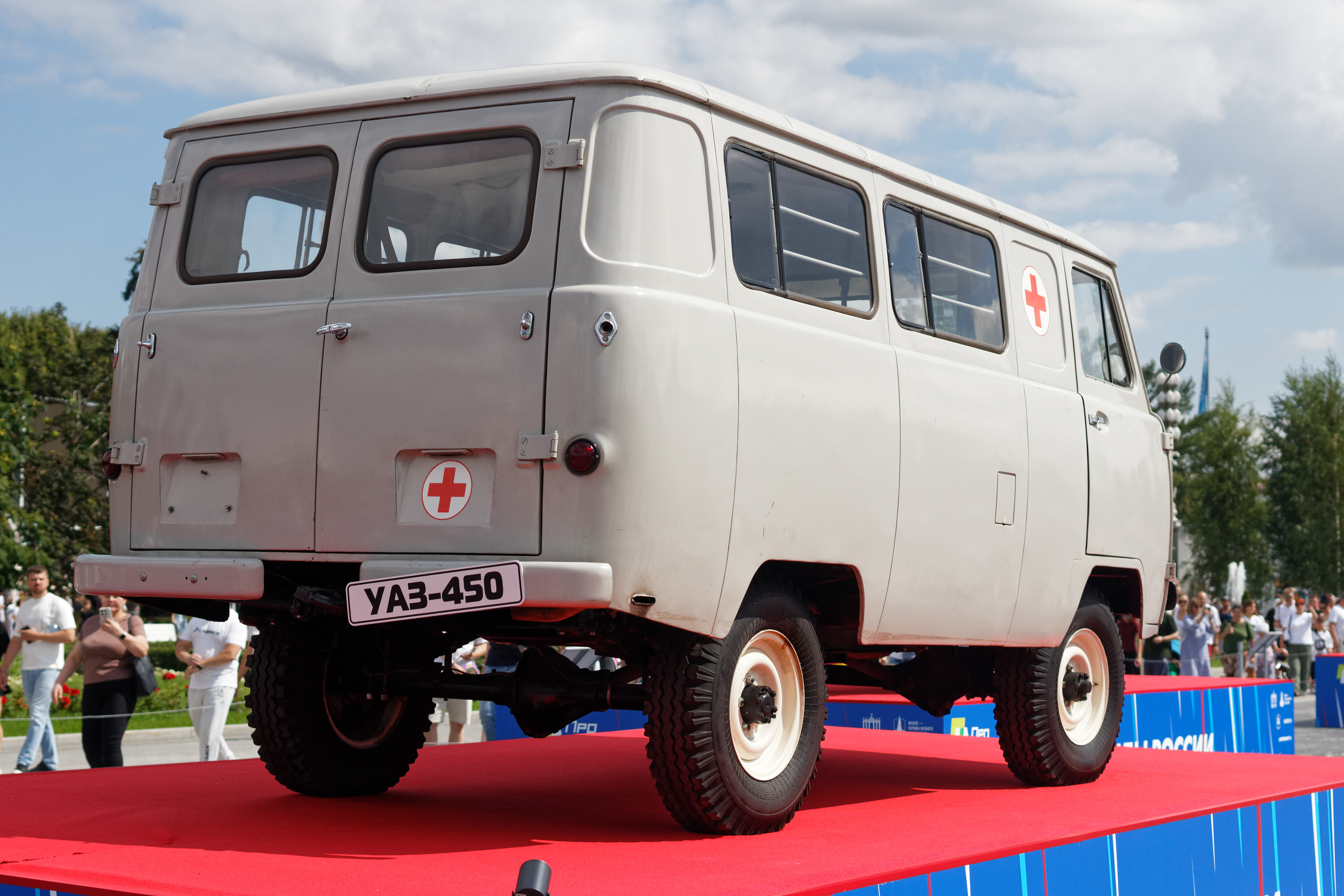
UAZ-450 (1958–1965)

UAZ was prepared for the serial production in 1958 and planned to assemble 4000 units per year. In June the van was presented at VDNKh in Moscow. First units of UAZ-450 had front suicide doors. The model was available in four bodystyles, van, ambulance, minibus and truck, the minibus had rear quarter windows and roof glass panels. Originally the model was equipped with engine based on GAZ-M20 Pobeda. The vehicle was tested with railroad wheels to be used as a railcar. Most vans were used as ambulances, they could seat up to 4 stretchers or 6 on the benches and one accompanying both. The vehicle was not comfortable for people on the move, as suspension in the submodel remained that of the standard model, but this van was, and in many places is still the only ambulance vehicle that can reach some of the most remote places.

In 1958, before the UAZ-450 was finished, its rear-wheel drive version of UAZ-450 was ordered, it received the UAZ-451 index. The main problem in design process was the front axle being overloaded. Various modification proposals were made and in the end it was decided to move the engine 73 mm (2.9 in) down. The truck undergone the testing where it was competing with GAZ-51. UAZ-451 has entered the serial production in 1961 but the minibus and ambulance models were cancelled.

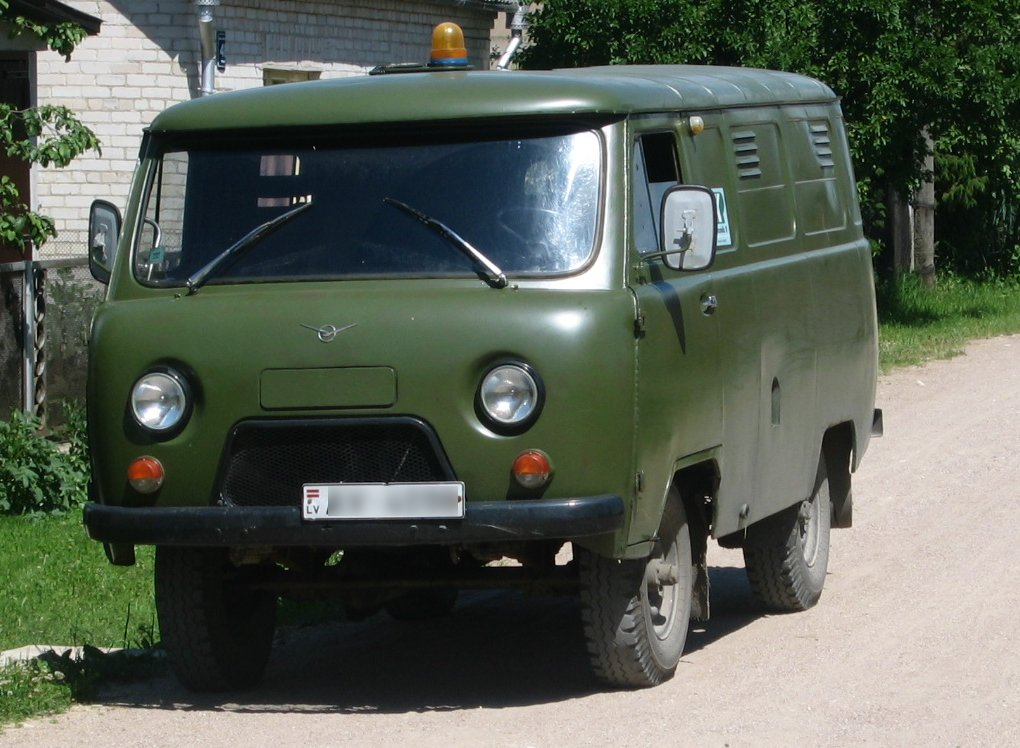

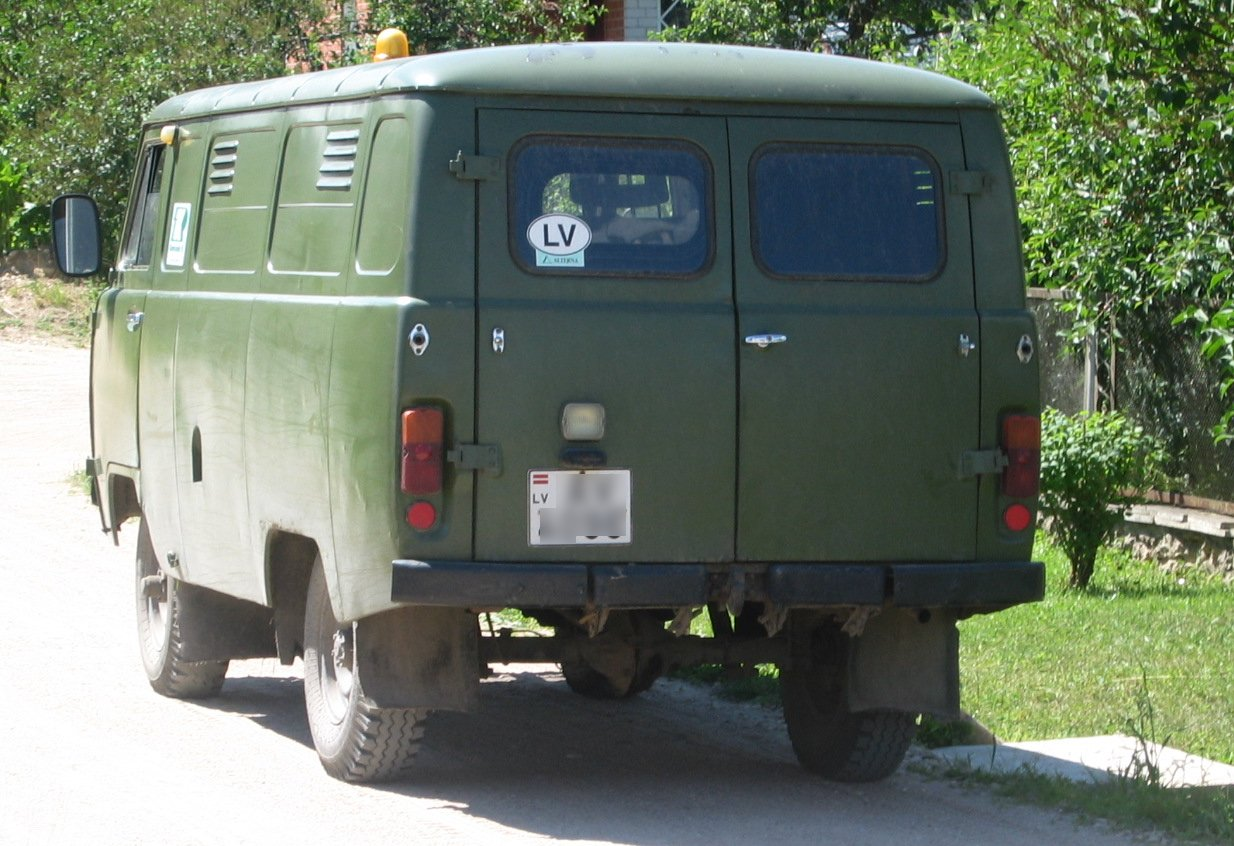
UAZ-3741

Since 1960 UAZ had been testing upgrades for 450 model, the work was finalized in 1963. The new vehicles received an OHV engine based on GAZ-21 Volga, 4-speed manual transmission and a facelift, roof windows were removed. The model was given an index of UAZ-452 and entered the production in 1966, an upgraded rear-wheel drive UAZ-451M had been in production for 1965-1982. Vehicles produced until 1979 were equipped with old-style lights: turn signal lights were colorless (white), rear lights were round, and the back of the body was rounder and had a 'fake quarter windows' left from 450. Subsequent post-1979 models got amber (yellow) signal lights, and rear lights were slightly bigger and rectangular, the fake windows were removed.

In 1985 the van was upgraded and spun off into separate submodels: UAZ-39625, UAZ-3962, UAZ-3303, UAZ-3909 and UAZ-2206. The upgrade consisted of lighting fixtures that met modern international requirements, alarms, a new instrument panel, and a new speedometer. The brakes were redesigned. The engine was also upgraded, and its power output increased to 99 hp against the previous 78 hp.

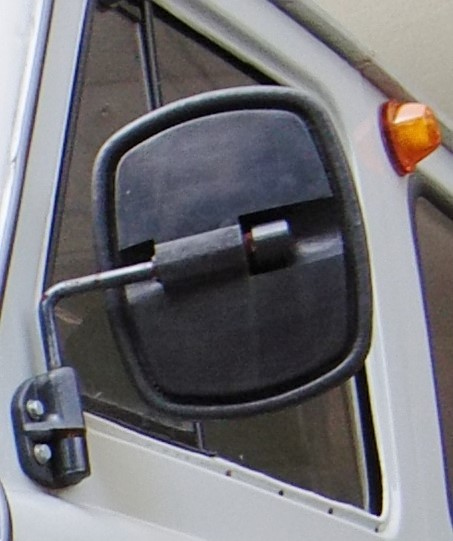
Old side mirror (pre 2000s)

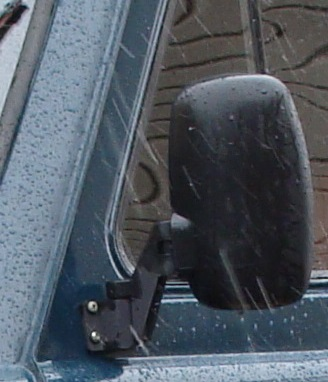
New side mirror (post 2000s)

In the early 2000s, the model was given new plastic side mirrors taken from the GAZ GAZelle van, headrests on front seats; and new passenger seats for a minibus version (UAZ-2206) were also given headrests. The pickup truck (UAZ-3303) was fitted with a metal body instead of a wooden one.

In subsequent years, the engine was upgraded to meet modern emissions requirements, and the van was also fitted with an injury-reducing plastic steering wheel.

In March 2011, models UAZ-39625, UAZ-3962, and UAZ-2206 received upgrades, consisting of ABS brakes, power steering, seat belts and the Euro-4 engine as standard equipment.

During the Russian invasion of Ukraine, mounting losses of supply and utility vehicles in the Russian military faster than they could be replaced resulted in UAZ-452 loaf vans being deployed to the frontlines. Despite some rugged off-road features, its lack of shock absorbers, poor comfort and weak engine made its performance extremely poor and an easy target for drones. Its thin steel panels do not provide protection against drone strikes, and the fuel tanks under the vehicle on both flanks make it susceptible to catching fire. By 2024, destroyed Bukhankas became a common sight in Ukraine and, as a result, Russian troops have attempted to reinforce the vans with caged armour. Additionally, modifications such as covering the vans in Kontakt reactive armor, including its windshield, were observed. Unlike the thick armour of tanks, the van is not capable of handling the explosive charge within the ERA blocks, and the modifications make it more dangerous for the crew.

== Modifications ==
=== 1958-1965 ===
- UAZ-450 (1958-1965): cargo panel van with windowless rear section
- UAZ-450D (1958-1965): light flatbed truck with wooden platform.
- UAZ-450A (1958-1965): medical transport, capable of transporting eight sitting patients (on foldable benches) or four laying patients (on wall-mounted stretchers) in the rear compartment. Due to the construction of the body walls, the UAZ-450A didn't have a side door for its rear compartment, making it inconvenient to access.
- UAZ-451 (1961-1965): rear-wheel-drive panel van.
- UAZ-451D (1961-1965): rear-wheel-drive light flatbed truck. Due to the balancing complications regarding the conversion of the GAZ-69 platform, which resulted in front axle overload, it was decided to modify a GAZ-21 chassis instead for the rear-wheel-drive versions.

=== 1965-1985 ===
- UAZ-452 (1965-1985): cargo panel van with windowless rear section.
- UAZ-452A (1965-1985): medical transport, capable of transporting six sitting patients (on foldable benches) or four laying patients (on wall-mounted stretchers) in the rear compartment, in addition to two seats in the cab and a seventh rear seat for a medical assistant. Two pairs of side windows on the rear compartment out of three (first pair blanked off). A rotating searchlight and a medical vehicle identification light were mounted on the cab roof. It carried limited medical equipment and was intended only to transport the patients to the nearest hospital, so it wasn't a "true" ambulance.
- UAZ-452D (1965-1985): light flatbed truck with wooden platform.
- UAZ-452V (1967-1985): passenger minibus with eleven seats (two in the cab, three rows of three in the rear section). Three pairs of side windows on the rear compartment. Originally planned as a standard public transport alongside the RAF minibuses (including bright two-tone paint jobs in promotional photography), but never actually employed as such due to insufficient production numbers, it was used in the same utility and military roles as the others.
- UAZ-451M (1965-1982): rear-wheel-drive panel van.
- UAZ-451DM (1965-1982): rear-wheel-drive light flatbed truck. Since the UAZ-451 already used the updated platform, it didn't receive a new index (like 450 to 452), only a "M" suffix. Produced in smaller numbers, both 451M variants were used mainly for collective farms and other rural applications, where four-wheel-drive didn't matter as much as in the military.
- UAZ-452E, -452AE, -452DE: variants of the van, medical transport and truck, equipped with shielded electric circuits (Э - "экранированный", shielded) for work next to air fields, radio communication centers and other places with heavy electromagnetic interference.
- UAZ-452G (1971): planned "true ambulance" variant of the UAZ-452, equipped with a single stationary stretcher, three seats for the medical personnel in the rear section, and standard medical equipment to assist the patient on the way to the hospital. Despite being successfully trialed, it never entered production for unknown reasons.
- UAZ-452AS and -452VS (1976): prototypes of medical transport and passenger minibus adpated for extreme cold (С - "северный", Northern), including additional insulation, double-glazed windows and more powerful heating. The UAZ-452AS was trialed in Yakutia in winter of 1976 and proved to be successful, but it never entered production. The UAZ-452VS is known to have been built, but it was never trialed and presumably cancelled along with the 452AS.

=== 1985-present ===
At least nine distinct body configurations have seen mass production in UAZ from 1985 onward:

- UAZ-3741: panel van, updated base UAZ-452. Variant with shielded circuits renamed UAZ-37411. Ongoing.
- UAZ-3962: medical transport, updated UAZ-452A. Variant with shielded circuits renamed UAZ-39621. Ongoing.
- UAZ-2206: passenger minibus, updated UAZ-452V. From 1990s onward, configurations with different number and/or design of seats have been introduced. Ongoing.
- UAZ-3303: light flatbed truck (originally with wooden platform, metal since 1990s), updated UAZ-452D. Variant with shielded circuits renamed UAZ-33031. Ongoing.
- UAZ-3909 (1994): combined cargo-passenger minibus with five seats and a table in the front half of the rear compartment (in addition to two seats in the cab), separated from the cargo-only rear half. Two pairs of side windows on the rear compartment out of three (rearmost pair blanked off). Ongoing.
- UAZ-33036 (1996): extended wheelbase variant of the UAZ-3303 (from 2300mm to 2550mm), same bed dimensions. Discontinued in mid-2000s.
- UAZ-39095 (1996): extended wheelbase variant of the UAZ-3303 with sleeper section in the rear of the cab. Discontinued in mid-2000s.
- UAZ-39094 (1997): double-cab flatbed truck (3 doors, 5 seats) with extended wheelbase. Ongoing.
- UAZ-39625 (2000): alternate cargo-passenger minibus, which reuses the UAZ-3962's body shell and interior configuration (seven seats as foldable benches in the rear), but doesn't have any medical markings or equipment. Ongoing.

== Users ==
- Armenia
- Azerbaijan
- Belarus
- Bulgaria
- Cambodia
- Cuba
- Egypt
- Georgia
- Hungary
- Kyrgyzstan
- Moldova
- Mongolia
- Netherlands
- North Korea
- Russia
- Serbia
- Syria
- Ukraine
- Vietnam

== Specifications ==
	UAZ-3303	UAZ-3741	UAZ-2206	UAZ-3962	UAZ-3909	UAZ-39094
Number of seats	2	2	8-11	8	7	5
Number of doors	2	4	4	4	4	3
Length, mm (ft)	4474 (14’ 8")	4440 (14’ 6")	4440 (14’ 6")	4440 (14’ 6")	4440 (14’ 6")	4847 (15’ 10")
Width, mm (ft)	2100	2100	2100	2100	2100	2100
Height, mm (ft)	2355	2101	2101	2101	2101	2355
Wheelbase, mm (ft)	2550	2300	2300	2300	2300	2550
Clearance, mm (ft)	220	220	220	220	220	220
Fording depth, mm (ft)	500	500	500	500	500	500
Curb weight, kg	1845	1805	1940	1805	1905	1995
Gross weight, kg	3070	2730	2790	2730	2830	3070
Payload, kg	1225	925	850	925	925	1075
Fuel	petrol (gas)	petrol (gas)	petrol (gas)	petrol (gas)	petrol (gas)	petrol (gas)
Engine displacement in liters.	2.7	2.7	2.7	2.7	2.7	2.7
Maximum power, hp (kW)	112 (82.5) at 4000 rpm	112 (82.5) at 4000 rpm	112 (82.5) at 4000 rpm	112 (82.5) at 4000 rpm	112 (82.5) at 4000 rpm	112 (82.5) at 4000 rpm
Maximum torque, Nm	208 at 3000 rpm	208 at 3000 rpm	208 at 3000 rpm	208 at 3000 rpm	208 at 3000 rpm	208 at 3000 rpm
Maximum speed, km / h (m/h)	115	127	127	127	127	127
Fuel consumption at 90 km / h, l / 100 km	15.4	13.5	13.5	13.5	13.5	17
Capacity fuel tanks, l	50	77	77	77	77	50
Gearbox	Manual, 5-speed	Manual, 5-speed	Manual, 5-speed	Manual, 5-speed	Manual, 5-speed	Manual, 5-speed
Transfer case	2-speed	2-speed	2-speed	2-speed	2-speed	2-speed
Brakes	dual circuit, vacuum booster, drum	dual circuit, vacuum booster, drum	dual circuit, vacuum booster, drum	dual circuit, vacuum booster, drum	dual circuit, vacuum booster, drum	dual circuit, vacuum booster, drum
Tyres	225 / 75 R 16	225 / 75 R 16	225 / 75 R 16	225 / 75 R 16	225 / 75 R 16	225 / 75 R 16

== Gallery ==
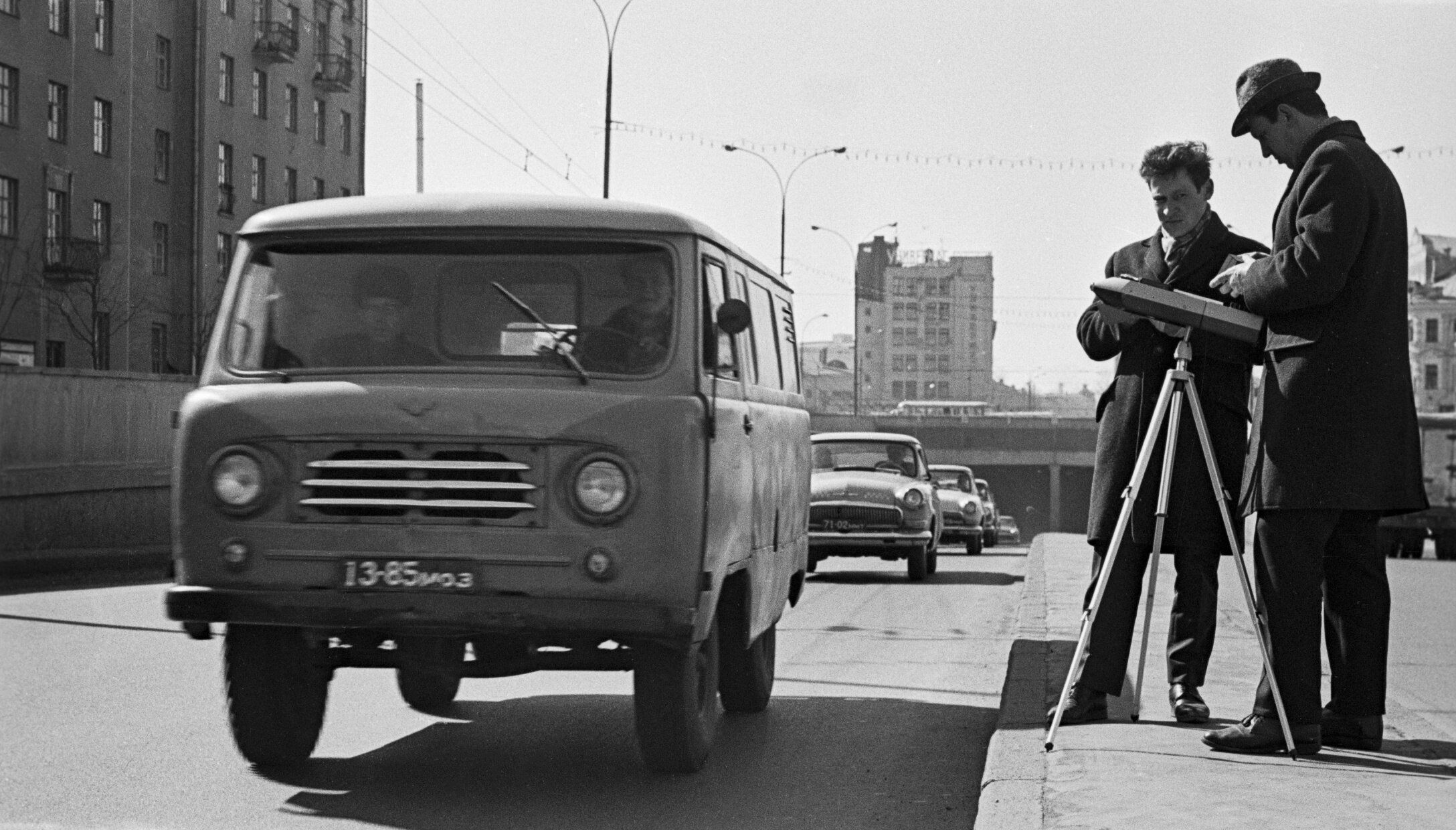
UAZ-451 in Moscow

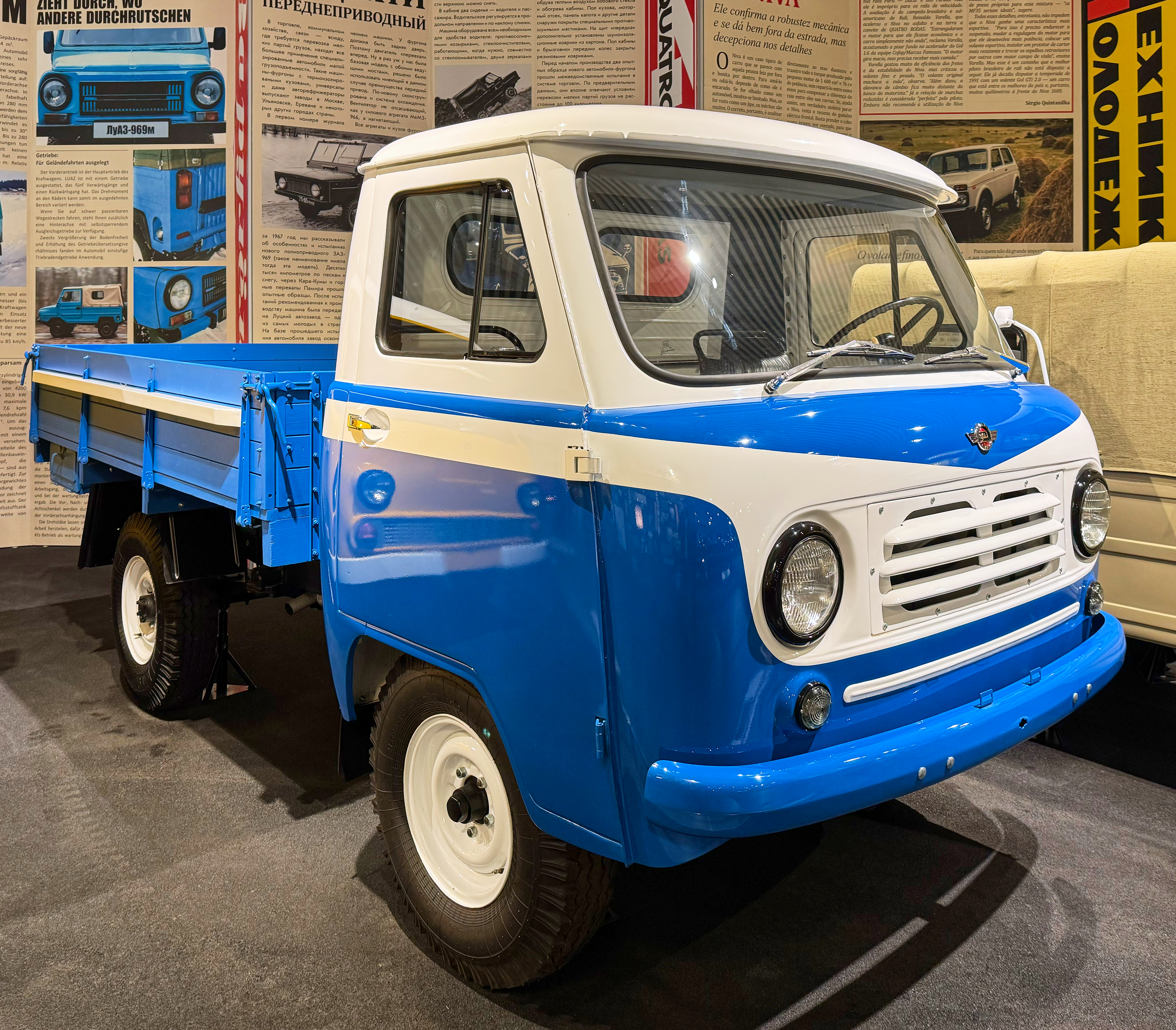
UAZ-451D at UMMC Museum Complex in Verkhnyaya Pyshma

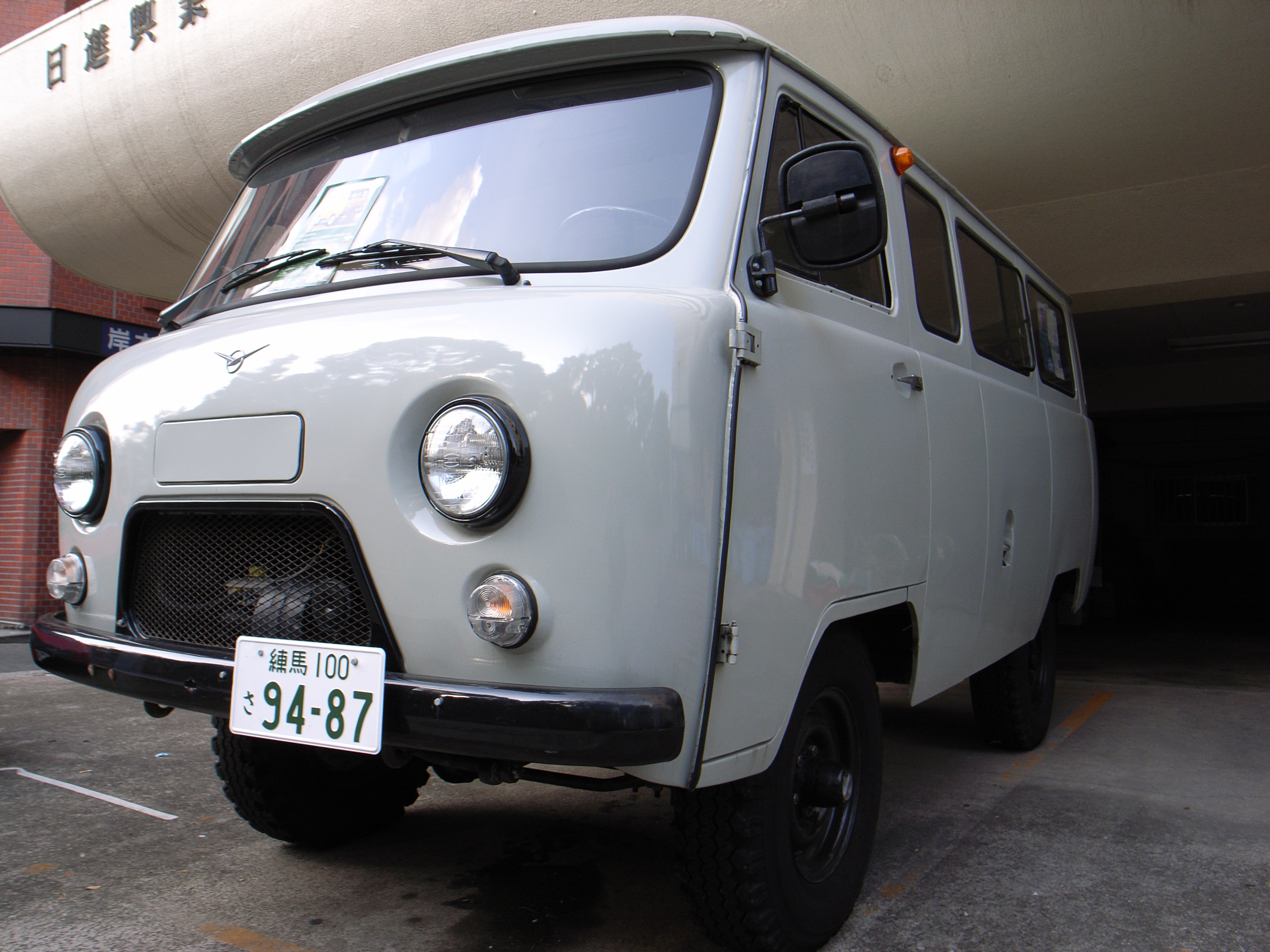
UAZ-452 in good condition, Japan

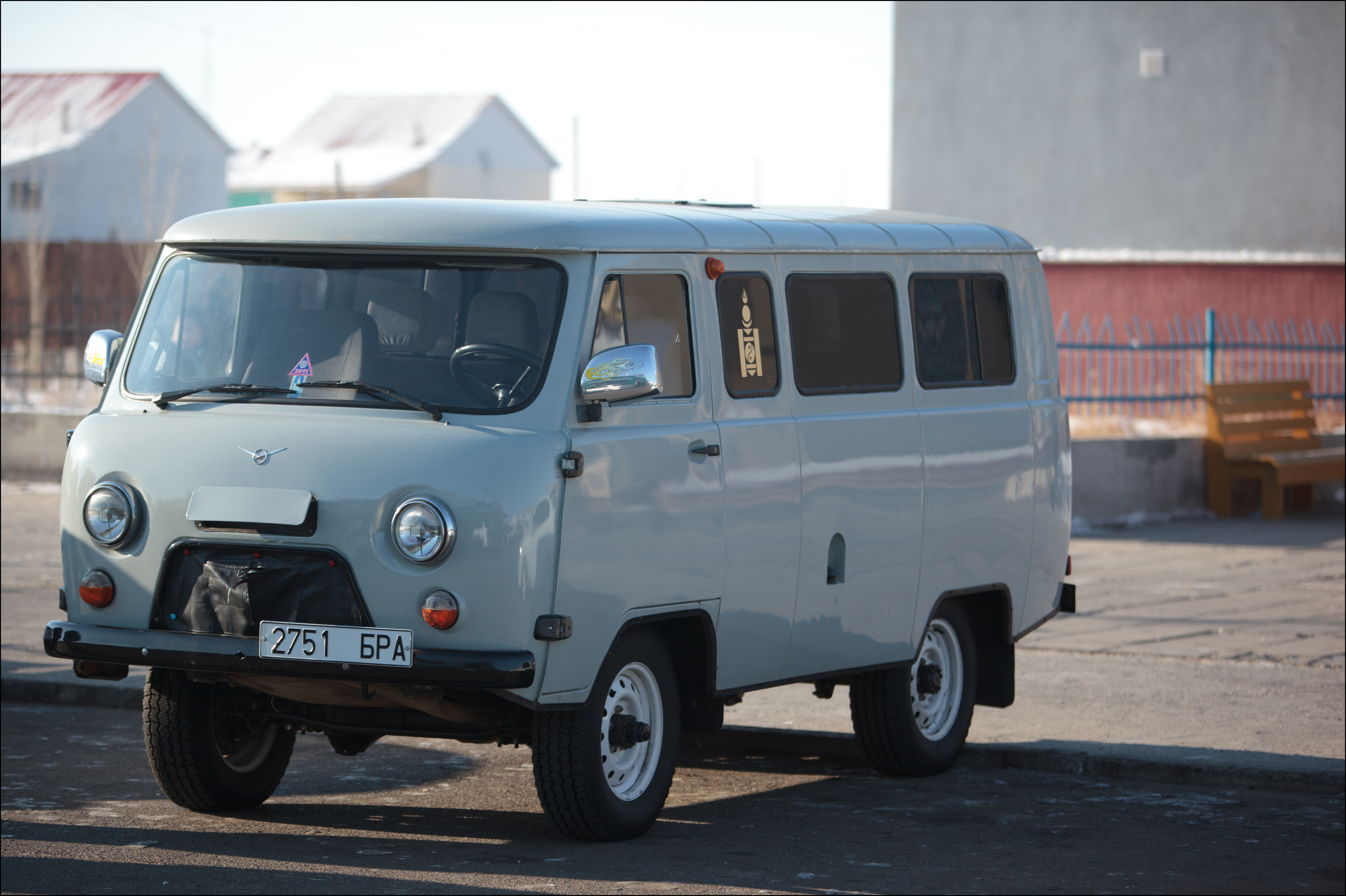
UAZ-2206

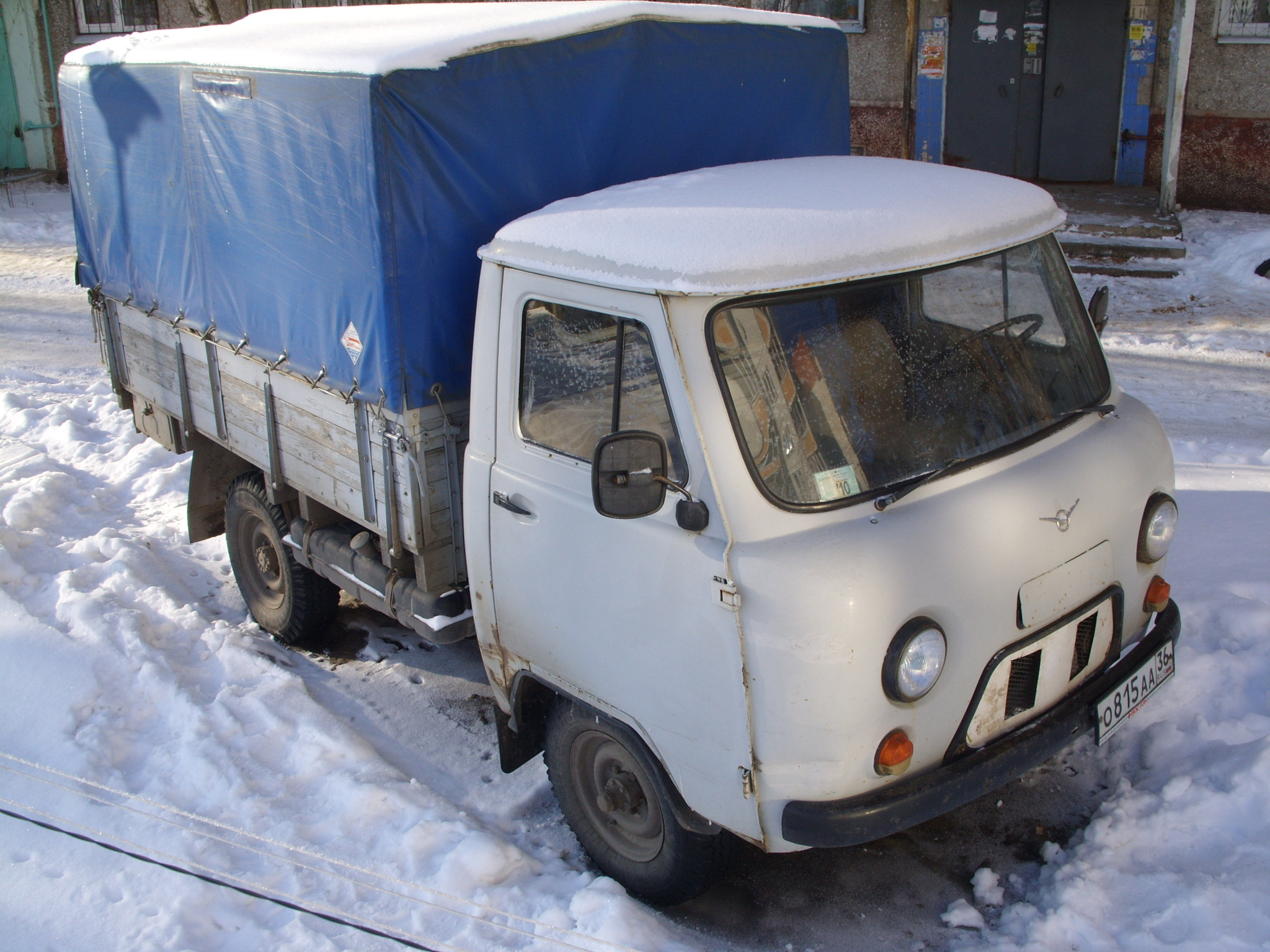
UAZ-3303

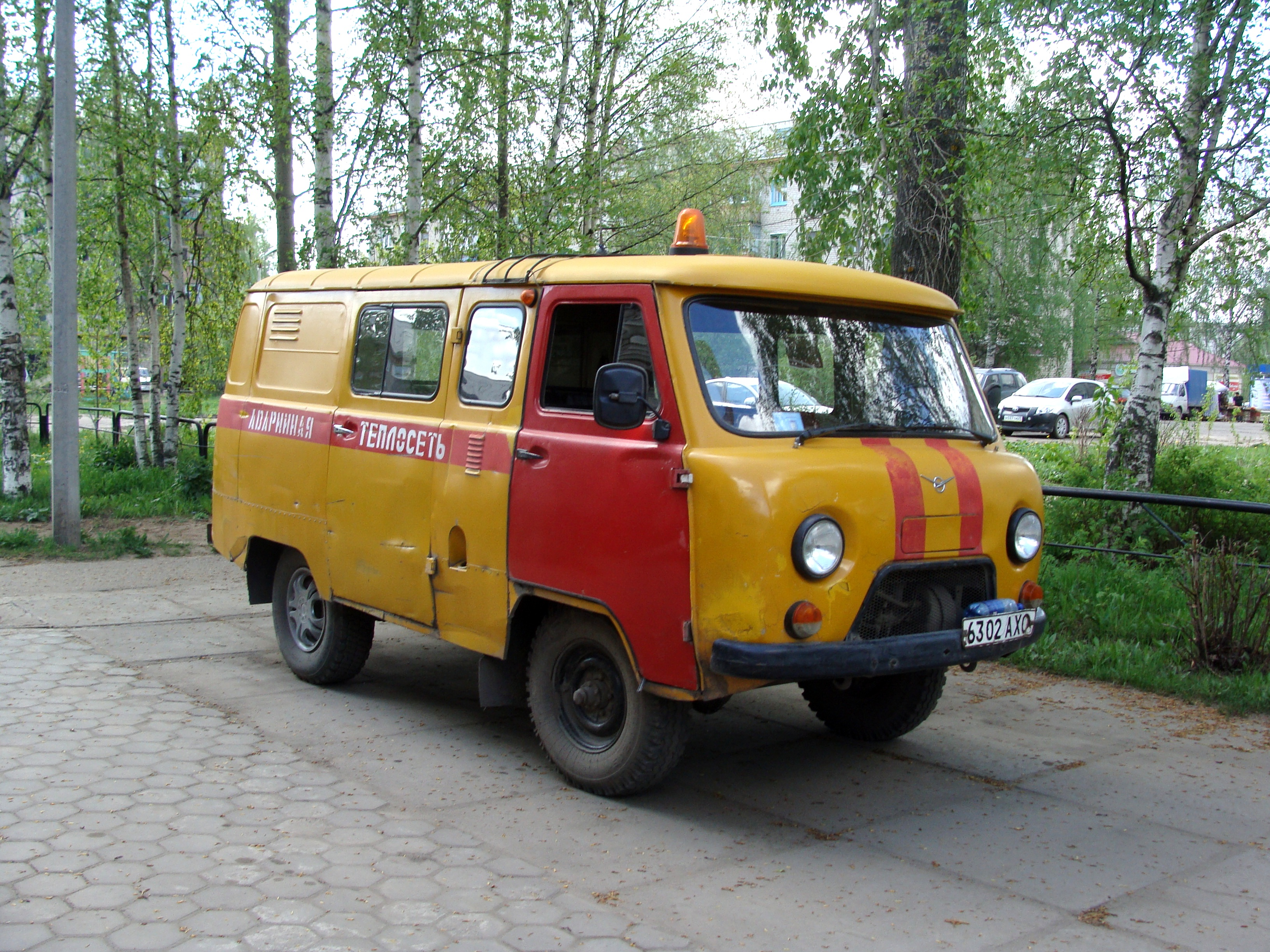
UAZ-3909 (Emergency Gas Service)

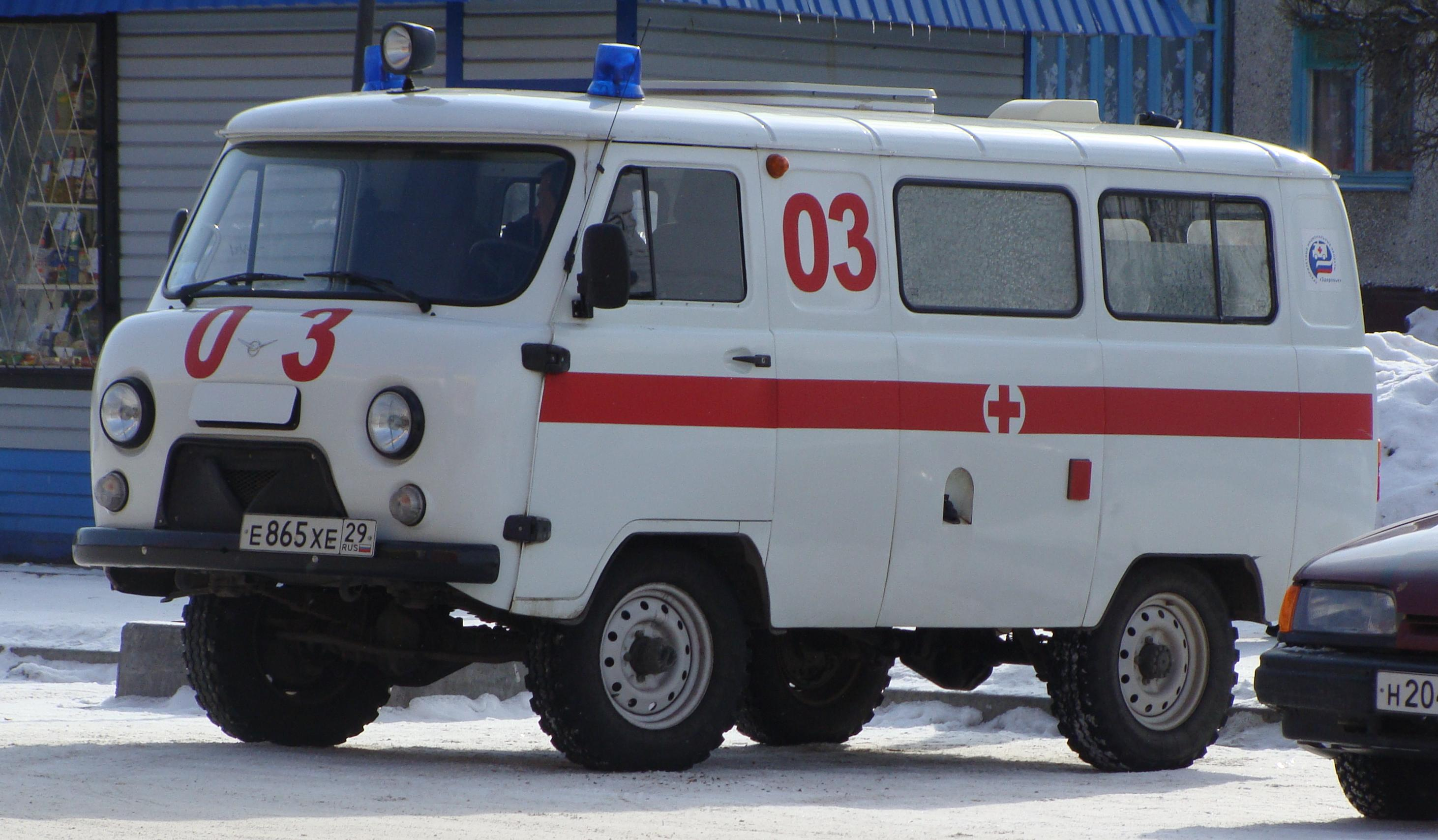
"Sanitarka" UAZ-3962 all-wheel drive van common in rural areas of Russia

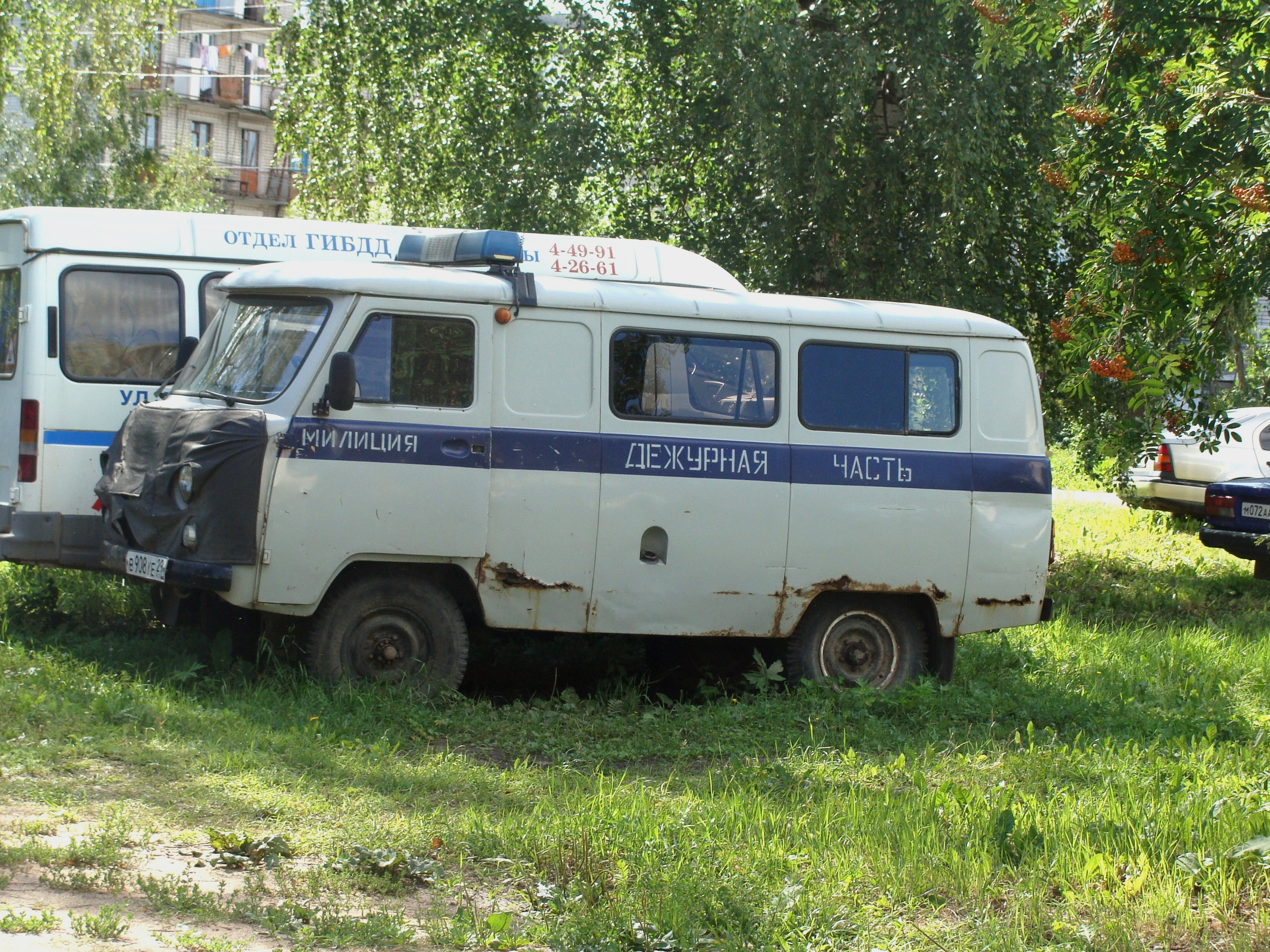
UAZ-39625

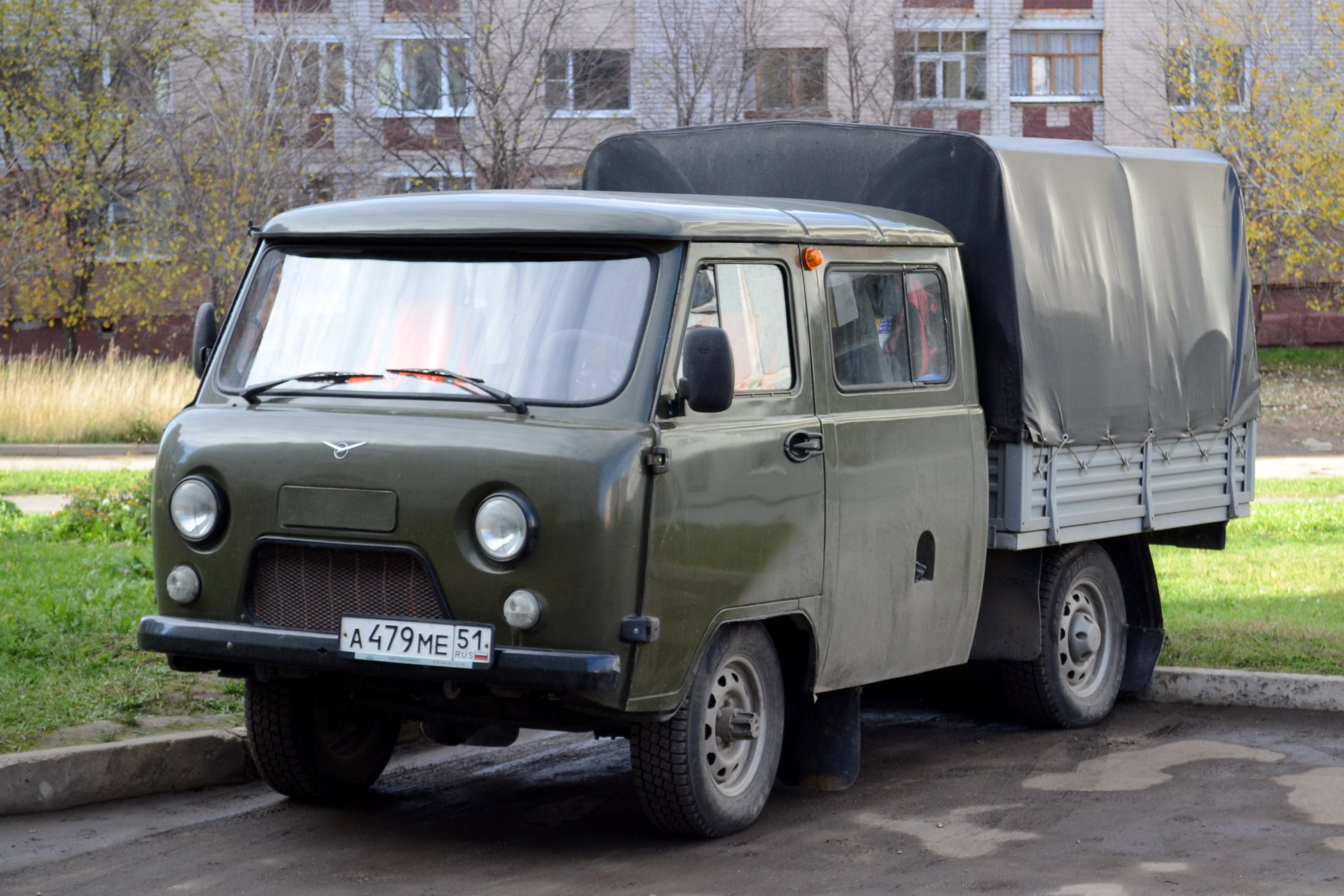
UAZ-39094

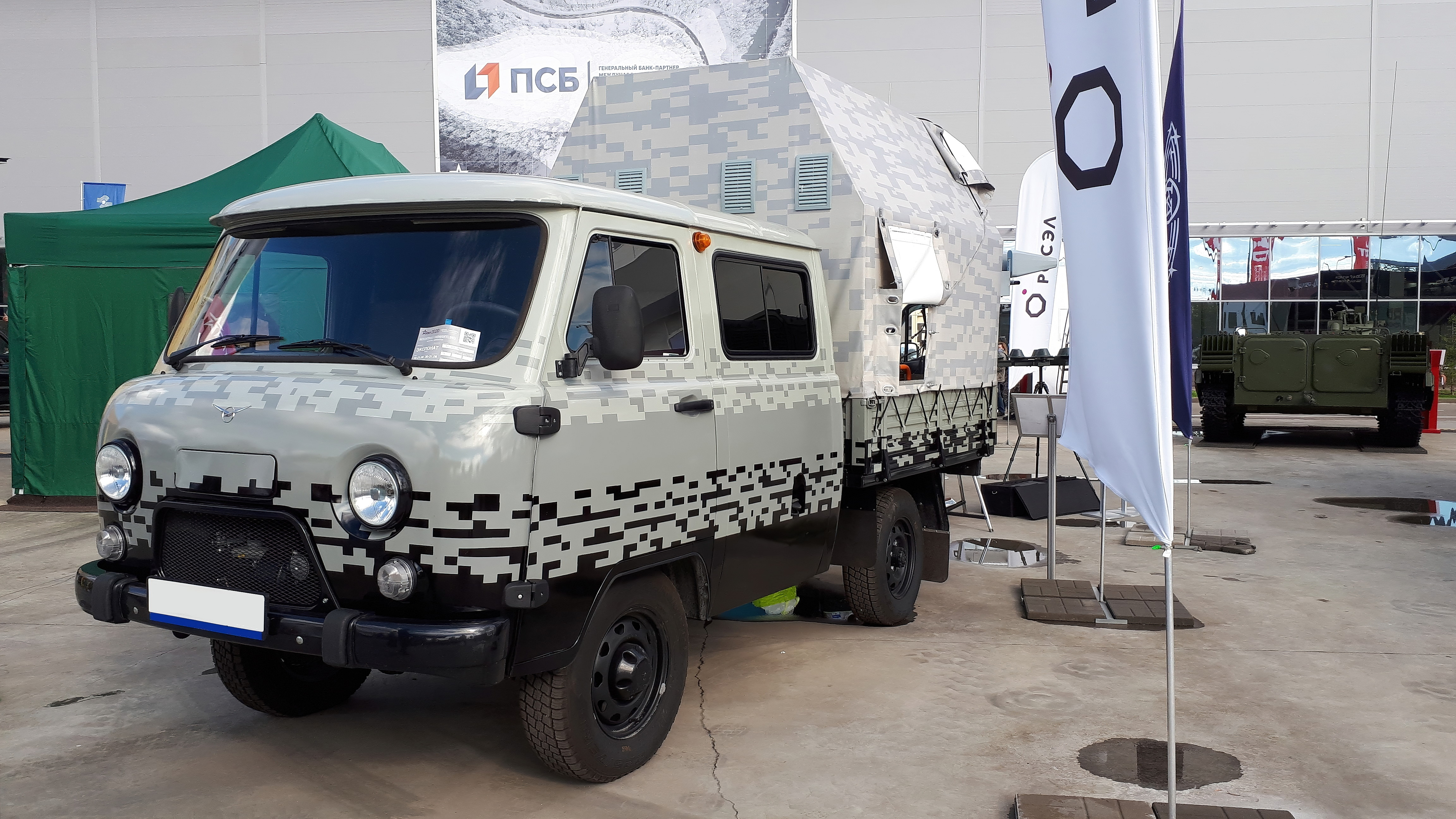
UAV counteraction complex "Ataka-Trophy" on UAZ-39094 chassis

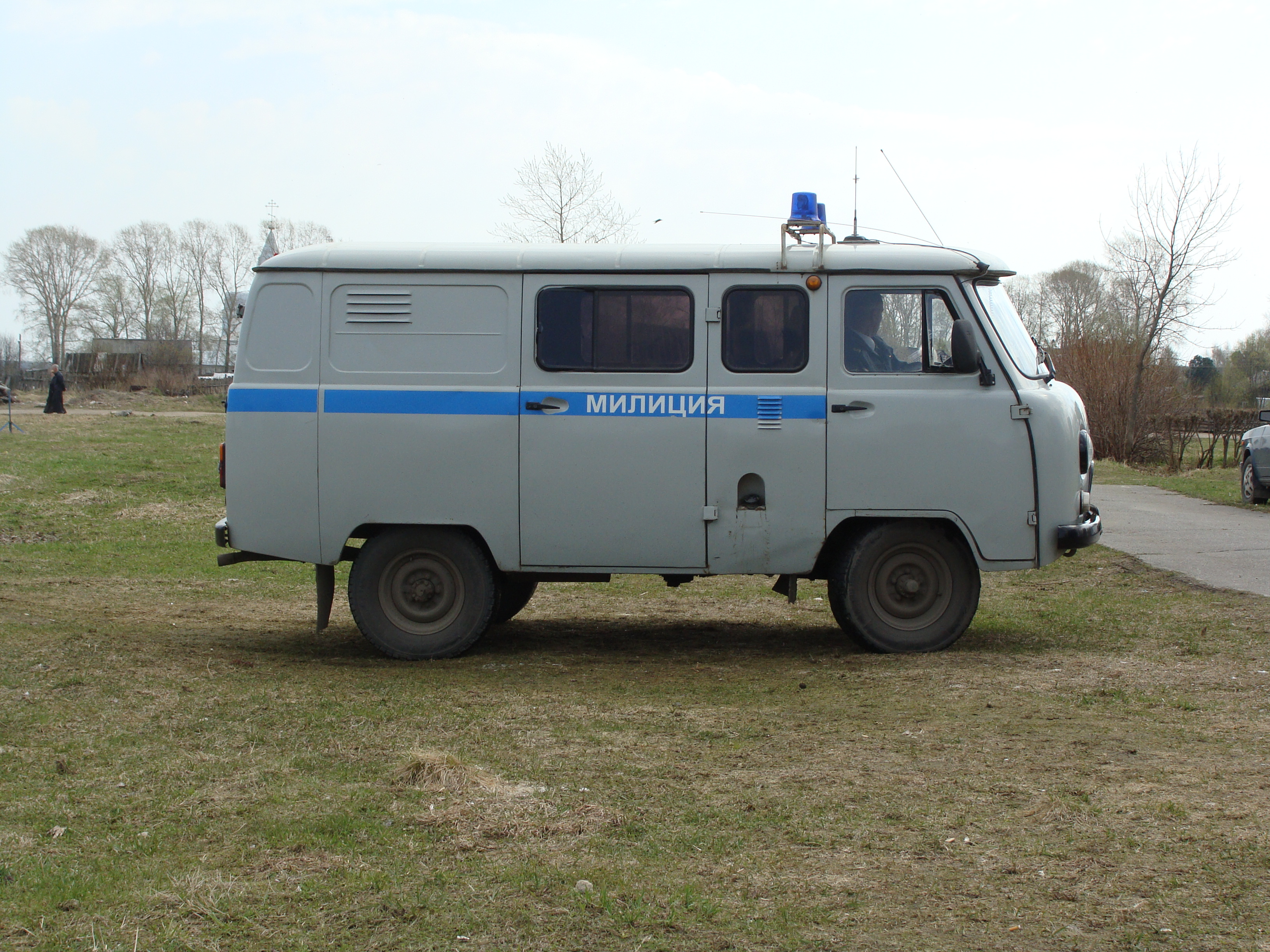
Militsiya vehicle

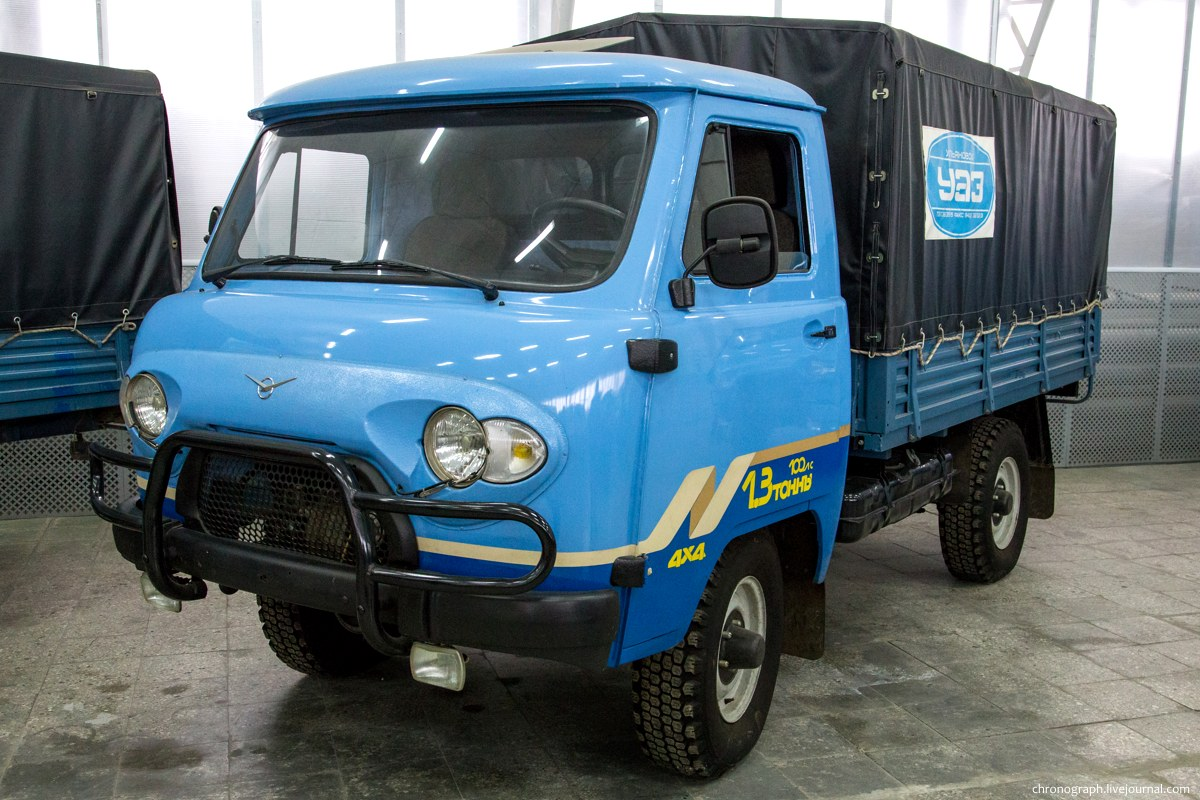
UAZ-33036

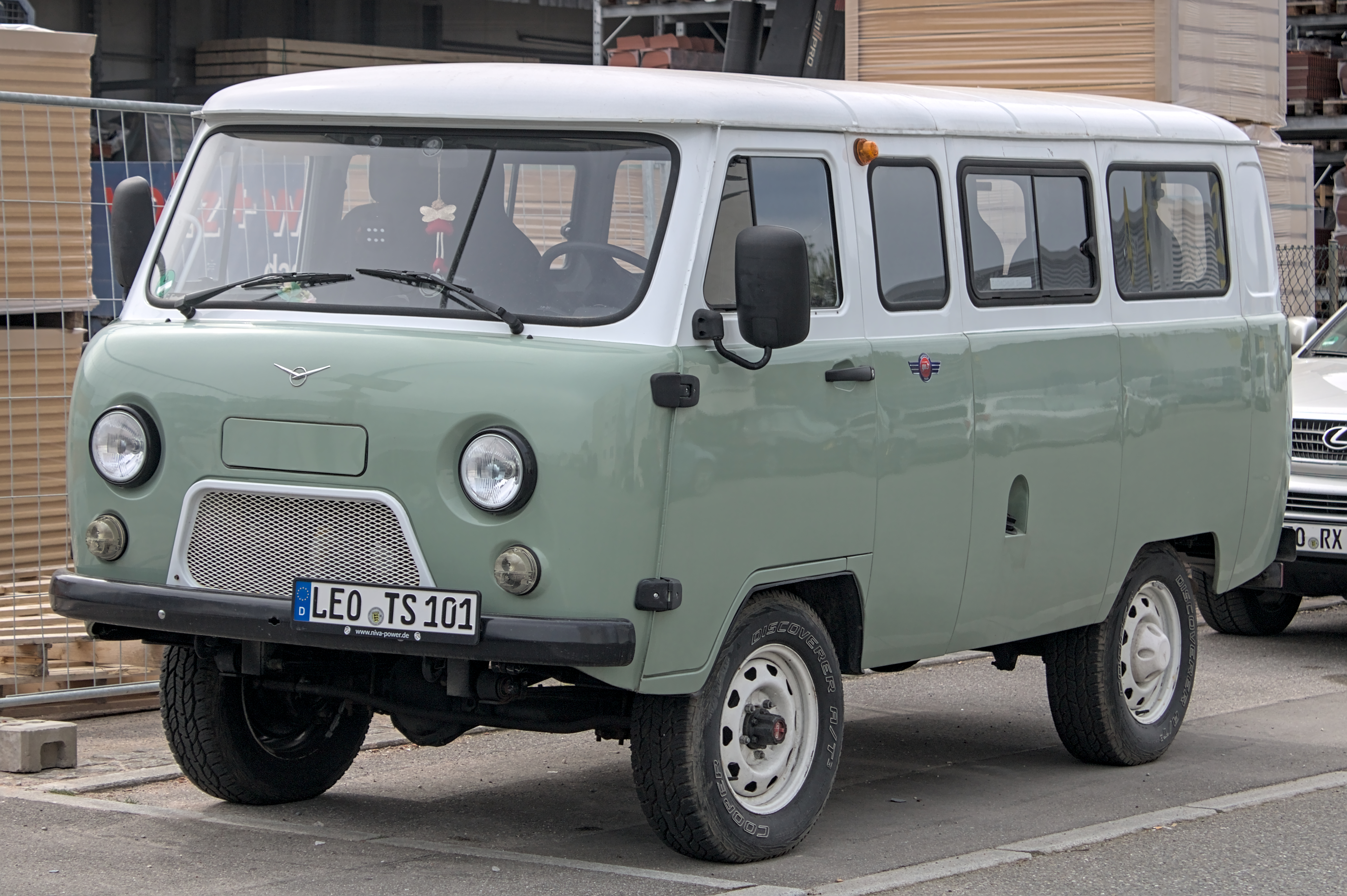
2018 "Jubilee" special and limited edition made in honor of the 60th anniversary of the launch of the UAZ-450. Cars of this edition have a two-tone retro coloring and stickers in the form of early UAZ emblem (Germany)

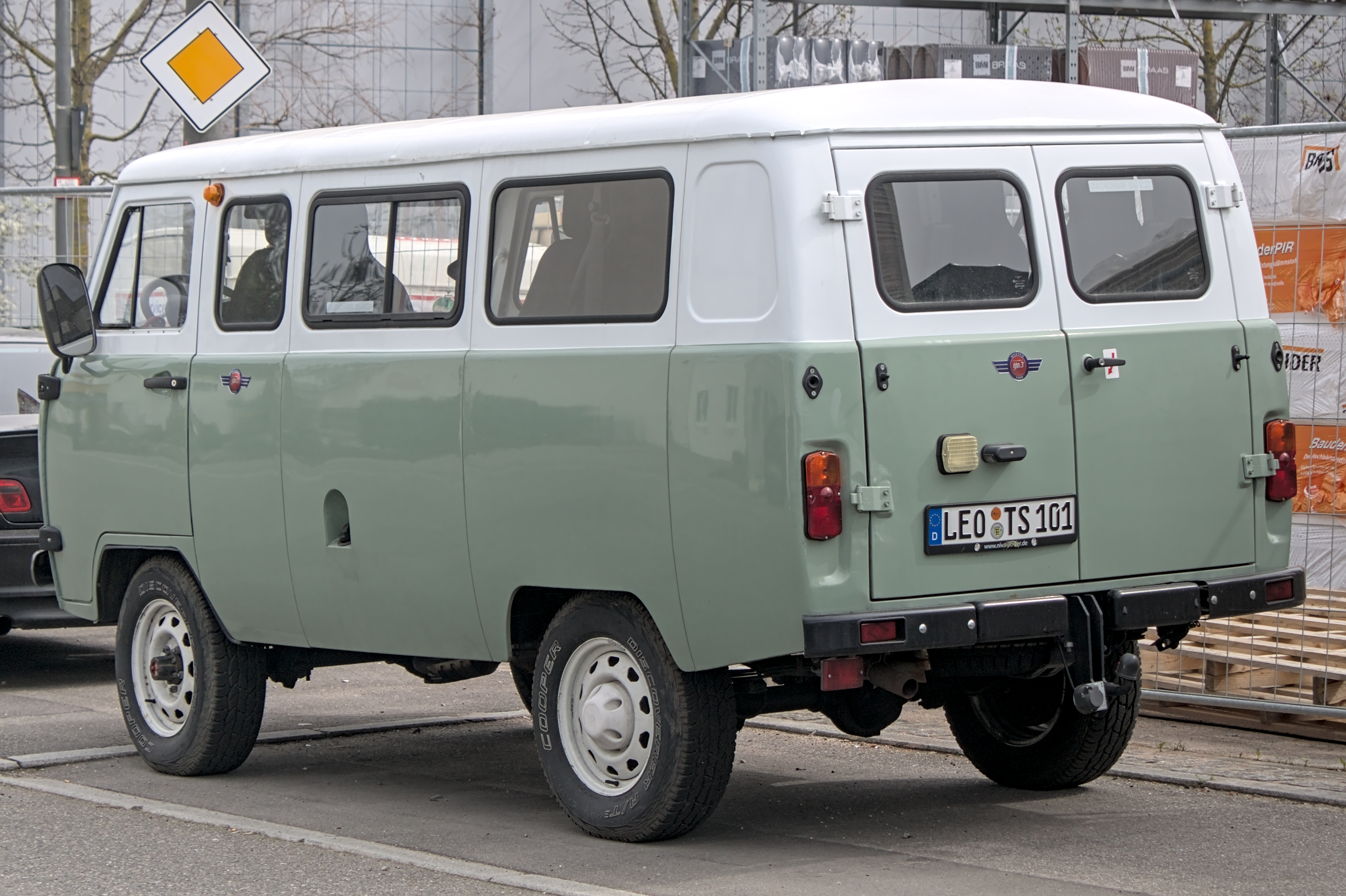
Rear view of "Jubilee" special edition

== See also ==
- RAF-977
- Barkas B 1000

== Bibliography ==
- Ambulance Vehicle UAZ-452-A // "Soviet Military Review", No. 8, August 1988. page 27
- Foss, Christopher F.; Gander, Terry J., eds. (1999). Jane's Military Vehicles and Logistics 1999-2000 (20th ed.). Janes Information Group. ISBN 978-0-7106-1912-9.
