= Mosenergo =

Russian power company

OJSC Mosenergo
- Native name: OAO «Мосэнерго»
- Type: Public (OAO)
- Traded as: MCX: MSNG; LSE: AOMD
- ISIN: US0373763087
- Industry: Electricity
- Founded: 1887
- Headquarters: Moscow, Russia
- Key people: Kirill Seleznev (Chairman); Vitaly Yakovlev (CEO)
- Products: Electric power Thermal energy
- Revenue: $2.51 billion (2020)
- Operating income: $105 million (2020)
- Net income: $112 million (2020)
- Total assets: $5.64 billion (2020)
- Total equity: $4.57 billion (2020)
- Owner: Gazprom Energoholding (53.5%); City of Moscow (26.4%)
- Number of employees: 16,725
- Parent: Gazprom
- Website: mosenergo.gazprom.com

Mosenergo (Мосэнерго, also known as TGK-3;) is a Russian power-generating company operating on fossil fuel and thermal generation. In addition to electric power, it also generates and sells heat for consumers in Moscow and the Moscow Oblast. The company was founded in 1887 in Moscow.

The power plants of Mosenergo have an installed electricity capacity of 11,100 MW and thermal capacity of 39,900 MW. Mosenergo operates 17 power plants with 104 cogeneration turbines, 7 gas-turbine units, one combined cycle power unit, two expansion generation units, 117 power boilers, and 114 peak-load boilers. Mosenergo is a subsidiary of Gazprom. Its shares are listed on the Moscow Exchange and London Stock Exchange.
