= Search and rescue in Russia =

Search and Rescue in the Russian Federation (Russian: Поисково-спасательные работы) is coordinated by the service of the Russian Ministry of Emergency Situations and includes a set of control bodies, forces and means designed to solve problems in the prevention and response to emergency situations. The basis of the service is search and rescue units.

== History ==
The modern system of search and rescue was created in accordance with the Order of the Government of Russia of July 28, 1992 No. 528 on the basis of tourist and mountaineering rescue services, points and centers.

The Search and Rescue Service is a subordinate institution of the Ministry of Emergency Situations, and is intended to carry out search and rescue operations in emergency situations of a natural and man-made nature.

=== Marine rescue ===
In 1923, the Special Purpose Underwater Expedition (EPRON) was created in the Soviet Union. Until 1931, it was under the jurisdiction of the OGPU, in 1931 it was transferred to the NKPS, in 1936 - to the People's Commissariat of Water Transport, in 1939 - to the People's Commissariat of the Marine Fleet. EPRON has become a powerful specialized monopoly organization for carrying out rescue, ship-lifting and diving operations. It had its own structural units (expeditions) in the Baltic, Black Sea, Northern, Pacific fleets and the Caspian military flotilla. With the beginning of the Great Patriotic War, EPRON was included in the Soviet Navy, and in 1942 it was reorganized into the Navy Rescue and Ship Lifting Service, which in 1944 was transformed into the Navy Rescue Service (ASS VMF).

By Order of the Council of Ministers of the USSR dated August 23, 1956 No. 5128-, the implementation of ship lifting and underwater technical work for national economic purposes for all civilian departments was transferred to the USSR MMF. These functions were to be performed by the Main Directorate of Sea Routes, Ship Lifting and Underwater Technical Works of the USSR MMF (Glavmorput MMF), which began to create on January 1, 1957, the corresponding units in all sea basins as part of the basin organizations of sea routes. Auxiliary watercraft and diving equipment were transferred to the Main Sea Route of the MMF from the ACS of the Navy.

Then, in the Black Sea, Baltic, Murmansk, Northern, Kamchatka, Sakhalin, Far Eastern and Caspian shipping companies, expeditionary teams of emergency rescue and underwater technical work (EO ASPTR) were created, operating on a self-supporting basis, which were assigned by order the functions of performing emergency operations. rescue operations and responsibility for rescuing people at sea. In 1972, the All-Union Association (VO) "Sovsudopodjem" was created at the USSR MMF, to which all expeditionary detachments of the ASPTR were functionally subordinated. In 1982, the VO "Sovsudopodjem" was abolished with the distribution of its functions between the VO "Moreplavaniye" and VO "Morstroyzagranpostavka".

In 1988, the State Marine Rescue Coordination Center and corresponding centers and subcenters in the country's sea basins were established under the USSR MMF. On January 15, 1991, the State Maritime Emergency Rescue Specialized Service of the USSR (Gosmorspetsvsluzhba) was created in accordance with Order of the Council of Ministers no. 48, subordinating basin emergency rescue departments to it. This structure, which in 1992, after the collapse of the USSR, became part of the system of organizations of the Ministry of Transport of Russia (Mintrans of Russia), was named the State Maritime Emergency Rescue Specialized Service of the Russian Federation (Gosmorspetsluzhba of Russia), and subsequently became the basis of the State Marine Rescue Service of Russia.

On July 23, 1998, by merging the Main Directorate of the State Marine Special Service of Russia and the State Maritime Rescue Service of Russia, the State Institution "State Emergency and Rescue Coordination Service of the Russian Federation" (Gosmorspasluzhba) was created. In 2004, during the administrative reform of the State Institution Gosmorspasluzhba and its divisions became subordinate to Rosmorrechflot of the Ministry of Transport of Russia. On March 31, 2005, the State Institution Gosmorspasluzhba became a federal unitary enterprise, and on May 26, 2011 - a federal budgetary institution (FBU "Gosmorspasluzhba of Russia").

In 2007, the Russian State Marine Rescue Service employed about 1,500 people, about 80 fleet units, including multi-purpose vessels, sea rescue tugs, diving vessels and auxiliary fleet. In addition to rescuing people at sea, the Russian State Marine Rescue Service also cleaned up oil spills at sea.

On June 24, 2014, the State Marine Rescue Service of Russia was transformed into the Federal Budgetary Institution "Marine Rescue Service of Rosmorrechflot". On March 15, 2018, the Federal Budgetary Institution “Marine Rescue Service of Rosmorrechflot” was renamed into the Federal State Budgetary Institution "Maritime Rescue Service".

== See also ==
- Civil defense in Russia
- Russian System of Disaster Management
- Russian Tsunami Warning System
