= Russian System of Disaster Management =

Russian complex system

All-Russian Comprehensive System Information and Warning the Population in Crowded Places (Russian: Общероссийская комплексная система информирования и оповещения населения в местах массового пребывания людей, romanized: Obshcherossiyskaya kompleksnaya sistema informirovaniya i opoveshcheniya naseleniya v mestakh massovogo prebyvaniya lyudey; in acronym ОКСИОН, OKSION) is Russia's complex system for monitoring, reporting and alerts. It was created in the framework of the Federal Target Program "Risk reduction and mitigation of natural and man-made disasters in the Russian Federation up to 2010". In May 2011, 596 OKSION terminal facilities in 37 data centers were built and put into operation. 2590 Plasmas and 1035 devices, such as "running line" were established.

The whole complex is developed and managed by an entity called Integrated Emergency Warning Systems for the Population (Russian: Комплексные системы экстренного оповещения населения) known in acronym OOO KSEON (Russian: ООО «КСЭОН»).

The system is divided into components dealing with on-street public notification (PUON) and at points located on the premises (pions). They consist of a large plasma or LCD screens, cameras, sound-amplifying equipment, and equipment for radiation and chemical control (PRHK). The system includes mobile complexes for informing and warning the population known as MKION (Russian: МКИОН), the system for protection against natural and man-made threats, informing and warning the population on transport known as SZIONT (Russian: СЗИОНТ) as well as the Regional Automated System of Centralized Notification of the Population (Russian: Региональная автоматизированная система централизованного оповещения населения) known in acronym R.A.S.TS.O (Russian: РАСЦО). The OKSION system has 4 levels: federal, interregional, regional and municipal. In 2023-2024, more than 10.5 thousand messages with emergency information were sent using the OKSION system through the mobile application of the Ministry of Emergency Situations of Russia.

== See also ==
- Civil defense in Russia
- Search and rescue in Russia
- Russian Tsunami Warning System
- Emergency Alert System
