= HMS Prince (1854) =

Royal Navy storeship

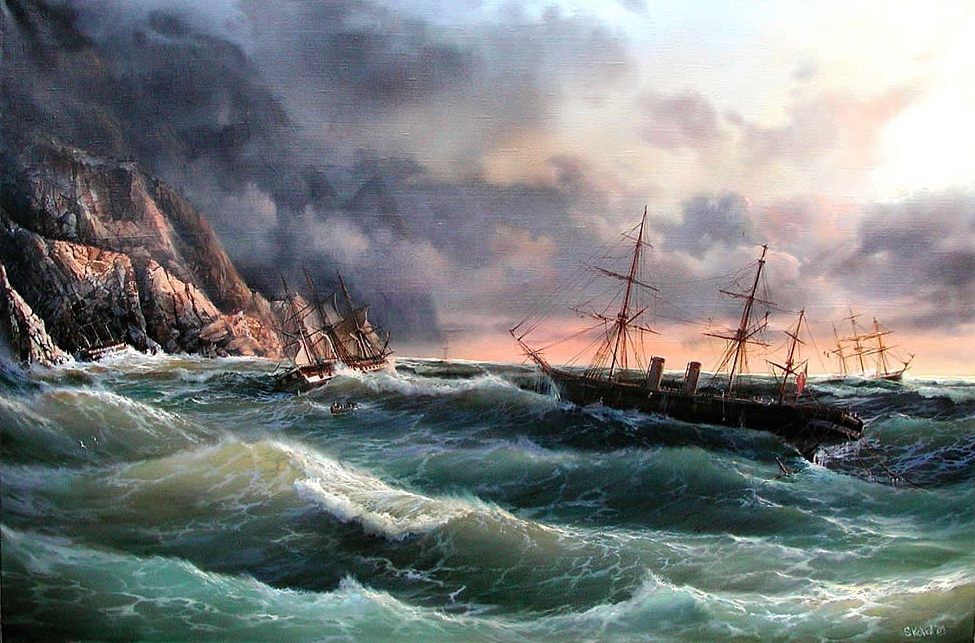
- The Wreckage of the Black Prince (sic) by Ivan Constantinovich Aivazovsky

History

United Kingdom
- Name: HMS Prince
- Builder: C J Mare, Blackwall
- Launched: 12 April 1854
- Acquired: Purchased in 1854
- Fate: Wrecked 14 November 1854

General characteristics
- Type: Storeship
- Tons burthen: 2710 bm
- Length: 291 ft 6 in (88.85 m)
- Beam: 41 ft 6 in (12.65 m)
- Depth of hold: 30 ft 8 in (9.35 m)
- Installed power: 300 nominal horsepower; 815 ihp (608 kW)
- Propulsion: 2-cylinder horizontal single-expansion steam engine; Single screw

HMS Prince was a Royal Navy storeship purchased in 1854 from mercantile owners and lost in a storm off Balaklava in November that year during the Crimean War.

She was purchased from the General Screw Steam Shipping Company for £105,000 by Admiralty Order dated July 1854 and commissioned under Commander Benjamin Baynton. She sailed for the Crimea, carrying 150 persons and a cargo of much needed winter uniforms. The loss of the ship and its cargo caused a public outcry in Britain because of the severe winter conditions being endured by troops in unsuitable clothing.

She was destroyed at a deep water anchorage outside Balaklava by a hurricane-force storm that tore her from her anchorage and dashed her onto rocks: she broke up completely within ten minutes and only six of her 150 crew were saved. Correspondent William Howard Russell considered her officers to have been negligent in losing her bower anchors. Commander Bayntoun, her commanding officer, perished in the wreck.

Twenty-nine other Allied transport ships were wrecked during the same storm.

A Ukrainian maritime archeological team led by Sergei Voronov, of the Ukrainian Academy of Sciences discovered the wreck in 2010 off Balaklava.

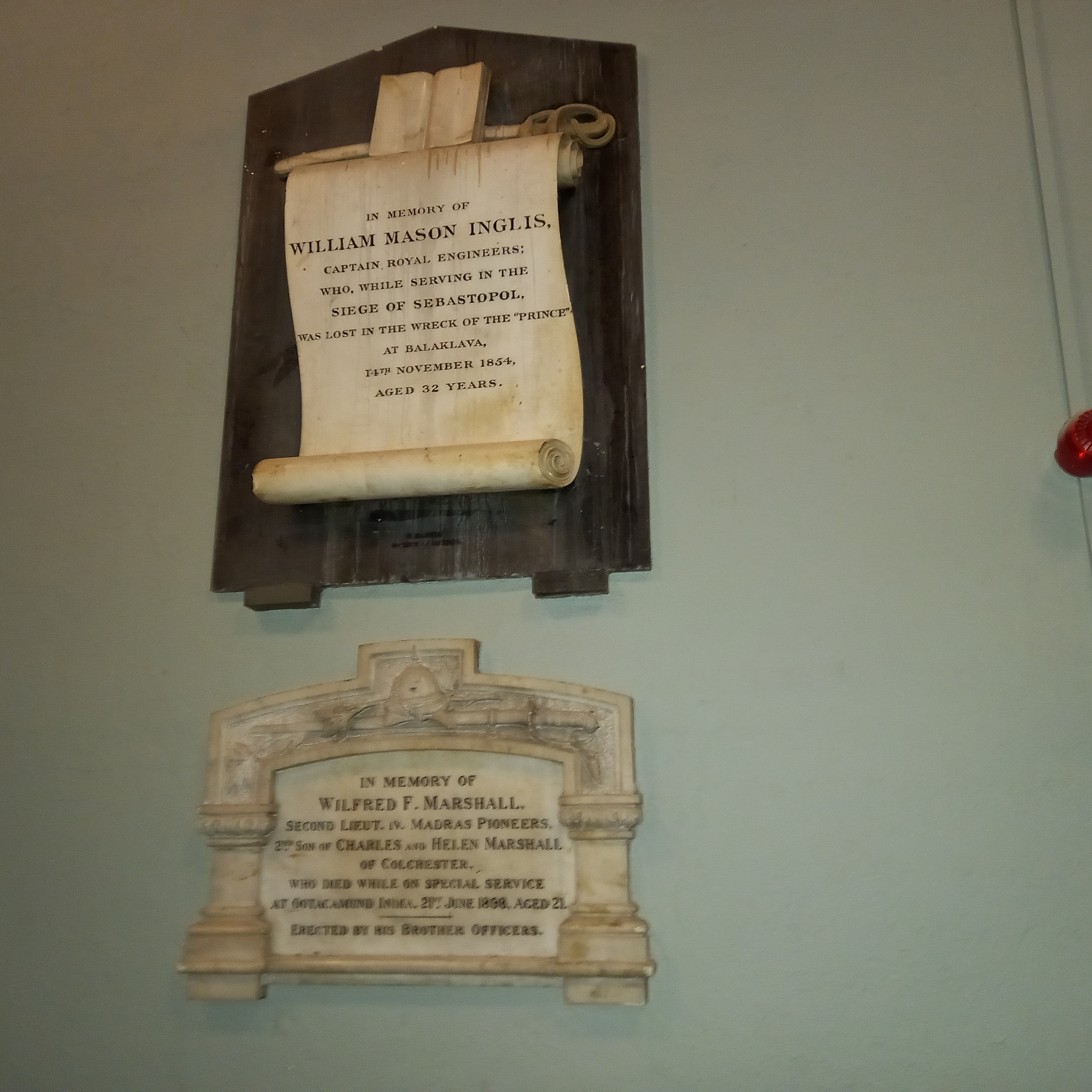
A memorial to one of the lost
