= Pipe industry of Russia =

The Pipe industry of Russia is part of that country's ferrous metallurgy sector. In recent years, approximately $8 billion has been invested in the modernization of Russian pipe manufacture, making it possible to produce new products and improve quality. By 2010, about 40% of the pipes produced in Russia were manufactured on new equipment.

== Manufacturing companies ==
=== VEST- MD ===
VEST-MD, located in Volgograd, manufactures welded tubes, special-purpose pipes for use in commercial and residential appliances and parts for the automotive industry. VEST-MD is a major Russian manufacturer of automotive tubes; its customers include ZiL, Kamaz, AvtoVAZ, MAZ, KrAZ, AutoZAZ, and SeAZ. The company's products are sold within Russia and also exported to Ukraine, Moldova, Uzbekistan, and Iran.

=== Vyksa Steel Works ===
Located in Vyksa near Nizhny Novgorod, the Vyksa Steel Works are a division of the United Metallurgical Company. In 2005, the company began making a new line of single-seam 1420mm pipes for main gas pipelines. The Russian bank Sberbank lent the company US$170 million to support this effort. As of 2006, Vyksa was the largest Russian manufacturer of metal pipes. In 2007, the company became the only Russian pipe supplier to Nord Stream 1, providing piping for the construction of an underwater section of Nord Stream's pipeline under the Baltic Sea. In 2008, the company began to use epoxy anti-corrosion coatings on pipes for use in offshore oil wells and gas fields.

=== Izhora Pipe Plant ===
Located in Kolpino, St. Petersburg, Izhora is fully owned by the joint stock company Severstal. Since 2006, the company has produced large diameter pipes up to 18 meters in length for the oil and gas industries. As of 2008, annual production was 438 tonnes. The company received a significant part of an order to supply large diameter pipes to the Bovanenkovo-Ukhta gas trunkline system.
