= Oka (automobile) =

Russian city car

Lada Оkа
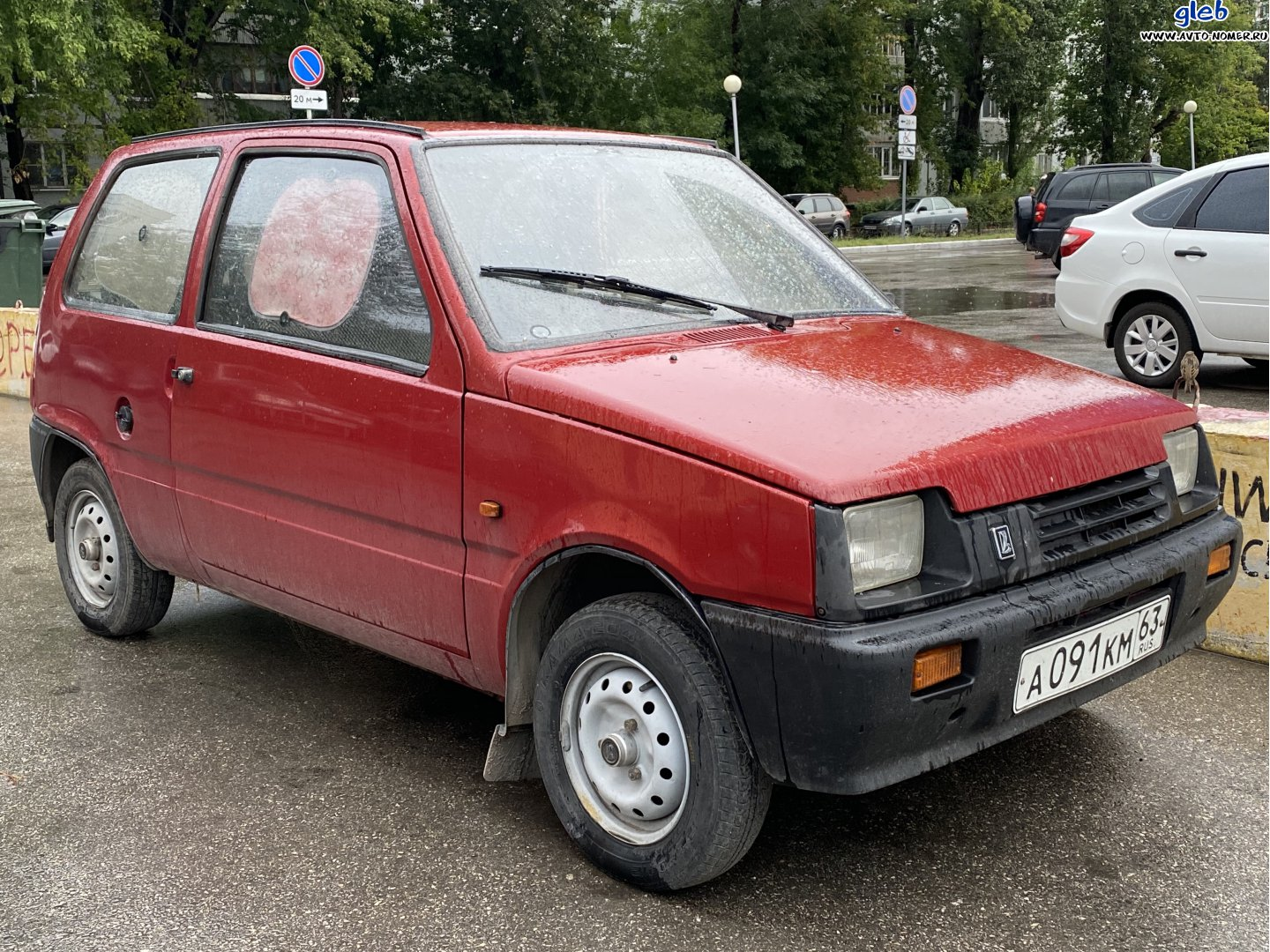

Overview
- Manufacturer: Lada (AvtoVAZ)
- Also called: VAZ-1111; SeAZ-1111; KamAZ-1111; SeAZ Oka; KamAZ Oka; Astro 11301; Oka NEV ZEV
- Production: 1987–2008; 2004–2008 (Azerbaijan)
- Assembly: Soviet Union / Russia: Togliatti; Russia: Serpukhov (SeAZ); Russia: Naberezhnye Chelny (KAMAZ); Azerbaijan: Ganja (Ganja Auto Plant)
- Designer: Yuriy Aleksandrovich Vereschagin

Body and chassis
- Class: City car (A)
- Body style: 3-door hatchback 2-door pickup truck
- Layout: front-engine, front-wheel-drive

Powertrain
- Engine: 644 cc SOHC I2; 749 cc SOHC I2; 993 cc TJ FAW I3; 1091 cc MeMZ 245.1 I4
- Electric motor: syncronus electric motor
- Transmission: 4-speed Manual

The Lada Оkа (VAZ-1111, SeAZ-1111, КаmАZ-1111, Astro 11301) (Russian: Ока (ВАЗ-1111, СеАЗ-1111, КамАЗ-1111)) is a city car designed in the Soviet Union in the later half of the 1970s by AvtoVAZ. It entered production in 1988, where it was powered by a 644 cc (39.3 cu in) SOHC two-cylinder engine. While developed at AutoVAZ by a team led by Yuri Kuteev, no production models were built there. Instead, manufacturing was outsourced to SeAZ factory in Serpukhov, and ZMA in Naberezhnye Chelny (then owned by Kamaz and now owned by SeverstalAvto). Massive plans were in place for a new plant in Yelabuga, but these failed to materialize. The car was also produced in Azerbaijan by the Gyandzha Auto Plant. The name comes from the Oka River in Russia, upon which Serpukhov is situated.

== History ==
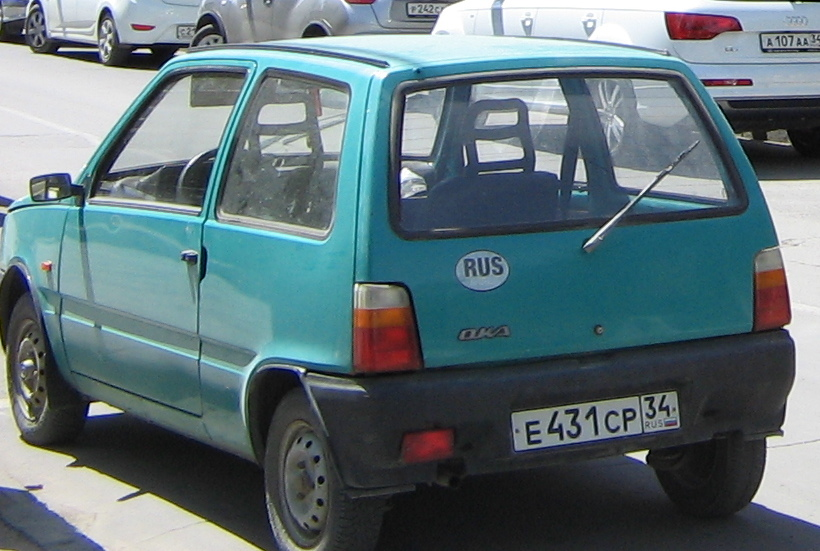
Oka rear

This affordable, lightweight and simple automobile replaced the air-cooled, rear-engined ZAZ Zaporozhets 966-968 series models as "the people's car". The SeAZ factory specialized in building purpose-built vehicles for handicapped drivers, and by the 1970s their offering was the S-3D, a spartan, boxy two-seat sedan powered by a motorcycle engine. Despite being noisy and smoky, the S-3D was, nevertheless, very popular with mobility-challenged drivers, many of whom were World War II veterans and, being such, received their vehicles free of charge. When engineers in Serpukhov under factory manager Alexander Popov (who told Minavtoprom (the automotive ministry) SeAZ needed a new product) conceived the Oka, they turned to their VAZ colleagues for help. The project was approved in 1983. Prior to the Oka, VAZ designers had been working on a number of microcars, including a similar-looking variant of the VAZ-1101 offered by the designer Yuri Danilov in 1971, but those models did not go into production.

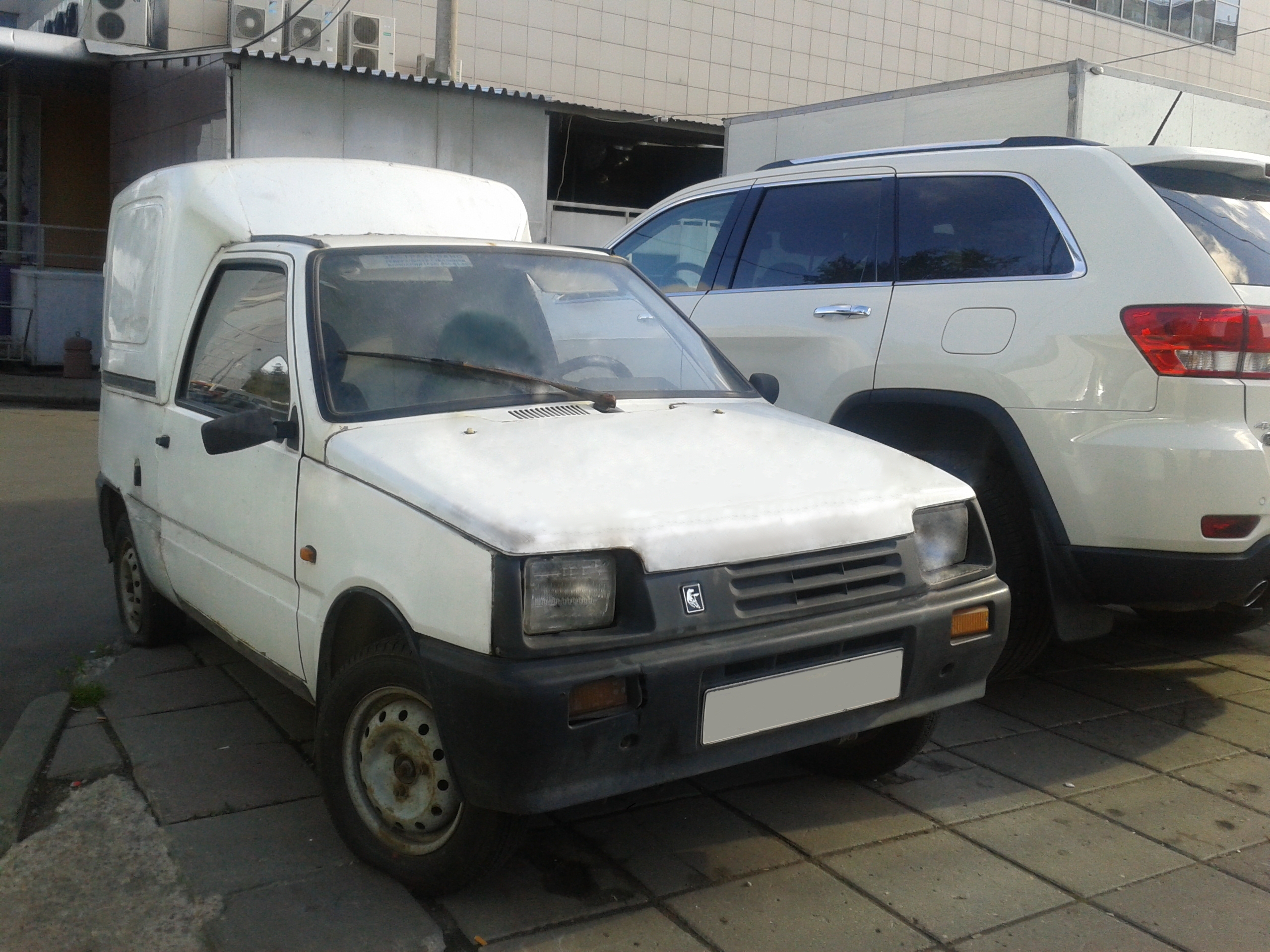
SeAZ-11116-50 cargo

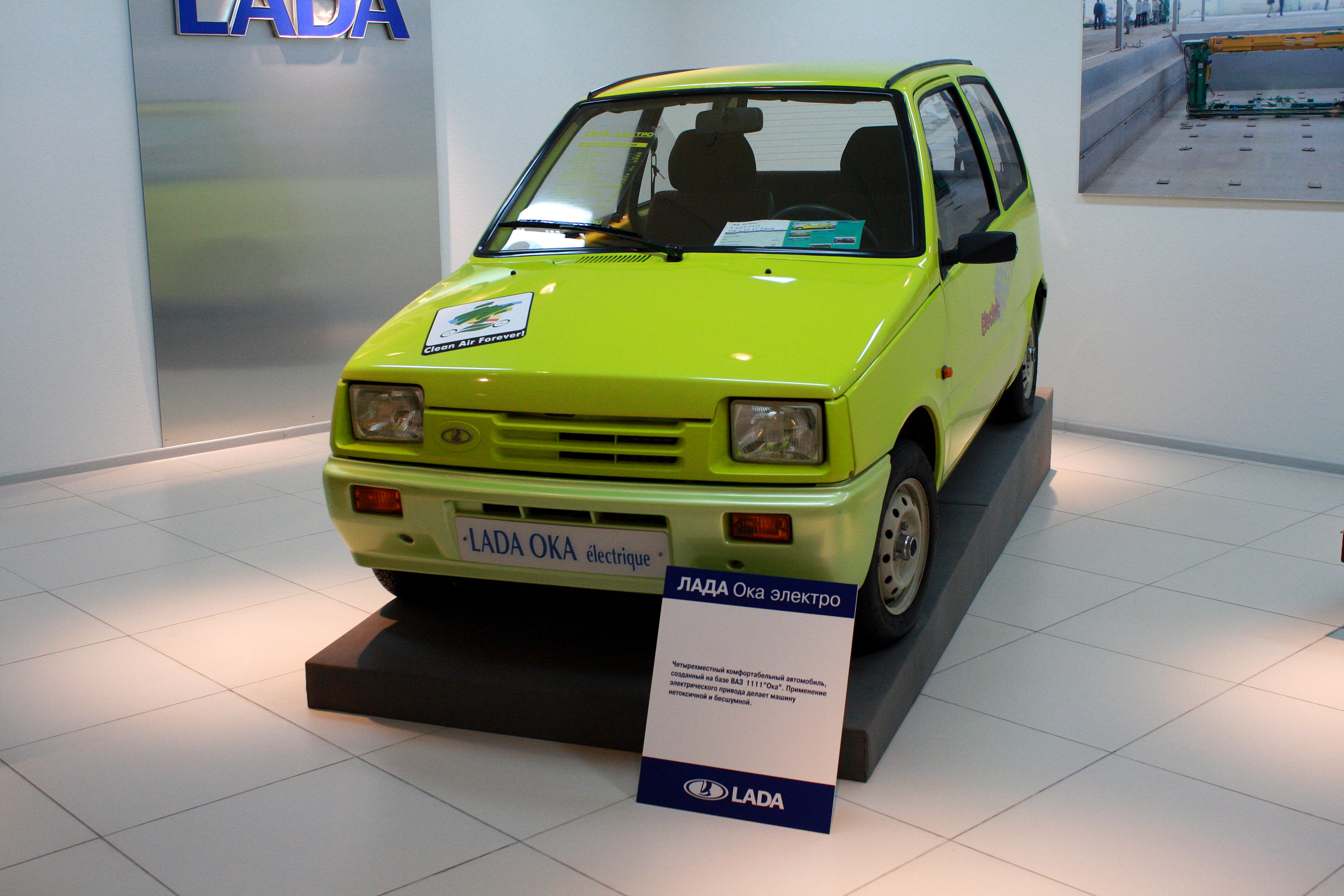
Lada Oka Electro

The tiny car was to be a replacement for the S-3D, and, like its predecessor, featured a simple motorcycle engine. Andrei Rozov, one of lead engine designers at VAZ, proposed a new three-cylinder engine, but, due to time constraints, that engine was not developed, and the decision was made to employ a two-cylinder variant of the VAZ-2108 four-cylinder engine by essentially chopping the latter in half. It was 1983, and the first Soviet front-wheel drive automobile, the 2108, was ready to hit the market. The Oka quickly became the next "people's car" project, a vehicle that "every factory engineer can afford".

The inspiration for Yuri Vereschagin, the VAZ exterior designer who penned the Oka, came from Japanese kei cars, such as the Daihatsu Cuore, which in turn, and along with the similar-looking Fiat Uno and Fiat Panda, resembled the styling of the Renault's supermini car, the Renault 5; the inspiration, however, was limited only to the size and overall proportions, and the car was different in design. The Soviet Ministry preferred the Oka over other three-door microcars designed by SeAZ and NAMI, as well as over a different, futuristic variant of the new car proposed by Vereschagin in 1984. Tightly restricted by project specifications, he did his work believing that his creation had little chance of seeing production.

In the event, however, he was proven wrong, as the Oka's overall acceptable operating characteristics and low price resulted in some 700,000 examples rolling off the assembly line over a period of nearly two decades. During test drives on roads and in the Caucasus Mountains, the car proved to have good handling, roadholding and, surprisingly for a vehicle of its size, excellent off-road capabilities.

The first cars were made in December 1987.

At the 1989 Moscow International Motor Show, VAZ exhibited a battery-electric version known as the VAZ-111E. The car was produced on a special-order basis until 1998. The 120 V worth of batteries were stored in the engine bay, beneath the seats and in the cargo bay, giving the car a range of approximately 100 km.

In 2002 the car was awarded zero stars out of a possible four by the Russian ARCAP safety assessment program; the version built in the ZMA factory was found to be marginally safer than the one built by SeAZ.

As of 2006, there were four versions of the Oka that were distributed: The basic VAZ-11113 Oka made by either ZMA (Naberezhnye Chelny) or SeAZ factory (33 hp, 125 km/h (78 mph) max, 3.2 litres per 100 km), "custom" VAZ-11301 Astro (49 hp) and VAZ-11113-27 Toyma - a light delivery vehicle with a cargo compartment instead of two rear seats.

Series production of the Oka ended in Russia in 2008, when SeAZ built the last batch of Okas with Chinese EURO-2 engines.

In the summer of 2023, the Russian government started talking about a possible revival of the brand.

== Versions ==
- VAZ-1111 - A basic model powered by a 650cc 2-cylinder engine. Produced between 1988-1996;
- VAZ-1111e - An experimental model with electric drive [2]. See also Rapan.
- SeAZ-1111-01 - A special version based on VAZ-1111 for disabled people without both legs;
- SeAZ-1111-02 - A special version based on VAZ-1111 for disabled people with one leg;
- SeAZ-1111-03 - A special version based on VAZ-1111 for disabled people with one leg and one arm;
- VAZ-11113 (LADA OKA) - a version powered by a larger 750cc 2-cylinder VAZ-11113 engine. Produced in 1996-2007. In 2000, "Auto Exotica 2000" demonstrated a version with 2-door "notchback" sedan with a separate trunk;
- SeAZ-11113-01 - a special version based on VAZ-11113 for disabled people without both legs. In 2000, an "Oka Prestige" prototype based on this version was shown with a soft canvas top on the left side of the roof and a swiveling driver's seat;
- SeAZ-11113-02 - a special version based on VAZ-11113 for disabled people with one leg;
- SeAZ-11113-03 - a special version based on VAZ-11113 for disabled people with one leg and one arm;
- SeAZ-11116 - a version powered by a Chinese-made 1000cc TJ FAW three-cylinder fuel-injected engine. Produced in 2007-2008 at SeAZ;
- SeAZ-11116-01 - a special version based SeAZ-11116 for disabled people without both legs;
- SeAZ-11116-02 - a special version based SeAZ-11116 for disabled people with one leg;
- SeAZ "Oka Junior" - limited-production sports version of for novice racers. Equipped with a roll cage, a sports steering wheel and seats with four-point seat belts;
- SeAZ "Sport" - a "semi-pro" racing version with a roll cage, Sparco seats with four-point safety belts, hood pins, and a lighter interior;
- "Oka-Astro-11301" - a limited-production extended wheelbase version originally produced in 2002-2006 by a small outfit called "Astro-kar" (later "Kamsky car assembly plant"). It was powered by a Ukrainian-made 1100cc MeMZ 245.1 carburetor engine certified to Euro-0 standards. This design was largely handbuilt with available parts;
- "Astro-113011" - similar to "-Astro-11301", but with a fuel-injected 1100cc engine certified to Euro-2;

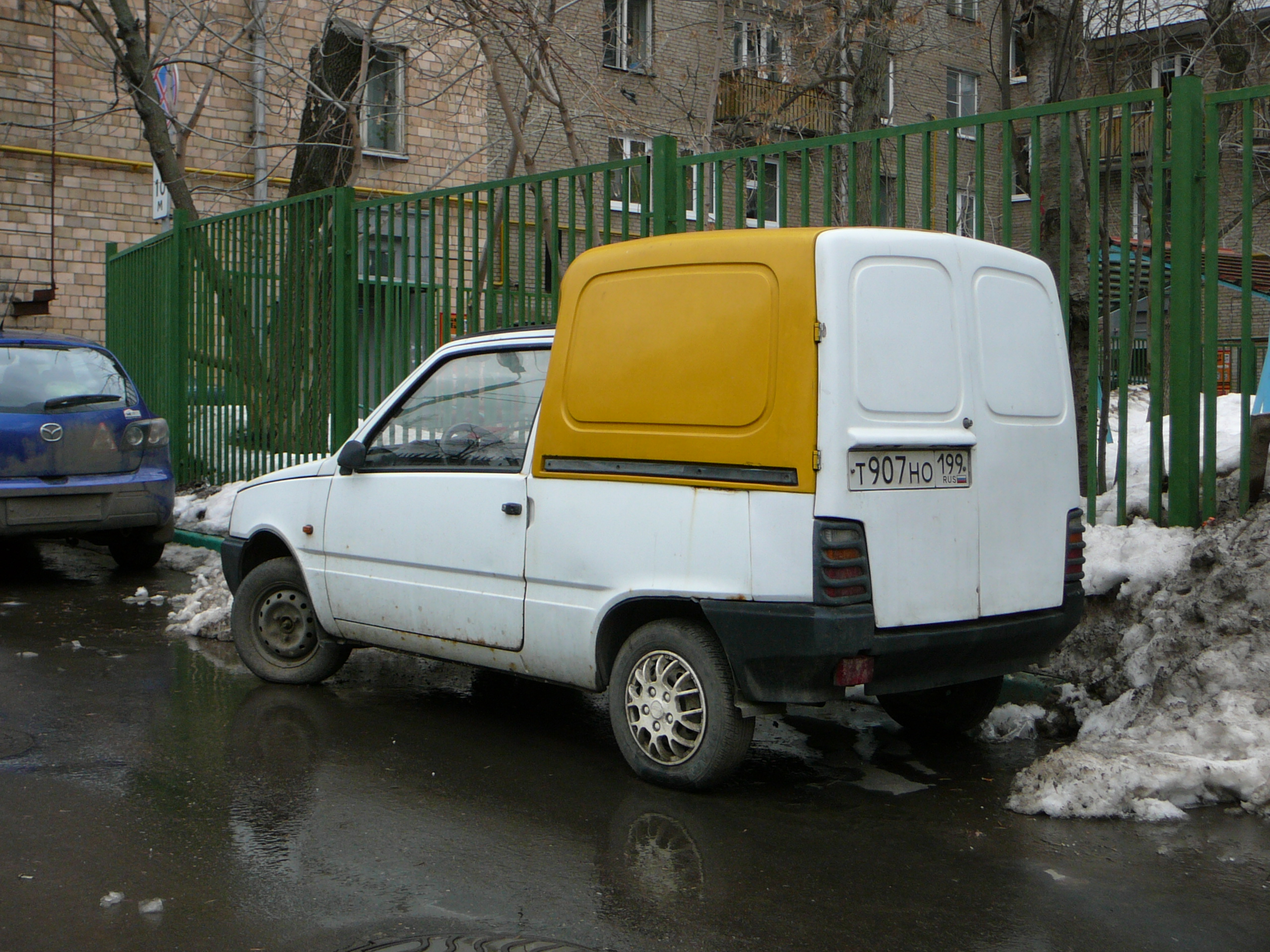
VAZ-17013 Toima panel van version

- VAZ-17013 "Toima" - a light delivery version based on the Kama "Oka". Equipped with a "sedan-delivery" body with an increased rear overhang which increased the usable volume of the cargo compartment to 1.5 cubic meters. Load capacity was up to 250 kg (without passengers). This was also produced by "Astro-kar" (later "Kamsky car assembly plant") in small batches in 2000-2007. In addition to the basic retail delivery model "Toima" had the following specialized version of: "Police", "Ambulance" and "Social", with glazed superstructure and a different layout salons, all produced in very small numbers;
- VAZ-1301 "Gnome" - a prototype of a pickup based on the Kama "Oka" featuring a frame under the cargo bed and load capacity of up to 350 kg (without passengers). Not produced;
- SeAZ-11116-010-50 "Eye of Van" and SeAZ-11116-011-50 "Oka Pickup" - commercial versions based on the SeAZ-11116 with respectively a "cube-van" and pick-up bodies. Only a pilot batch produced in 2007;
- SeAZ-11116-010-52 "Oka Universal" - a commercial version with a hatchback body with windowless sides and a rear cargo compartment with an elevated roof. A few prototypes built in 2007.
- SeAZ-11116-60 - a commercial version with a stake body. A few prototypes built in 2007.
- TTM-1901 "Golden Eagle" - essentially a snowmobile with skis in the front and tracks in rear. Designed to transport personnel and tow skiers. Built to order by Nizhny Novgorod-based "Transport" outfit using Oka bodies.

== Usage ==
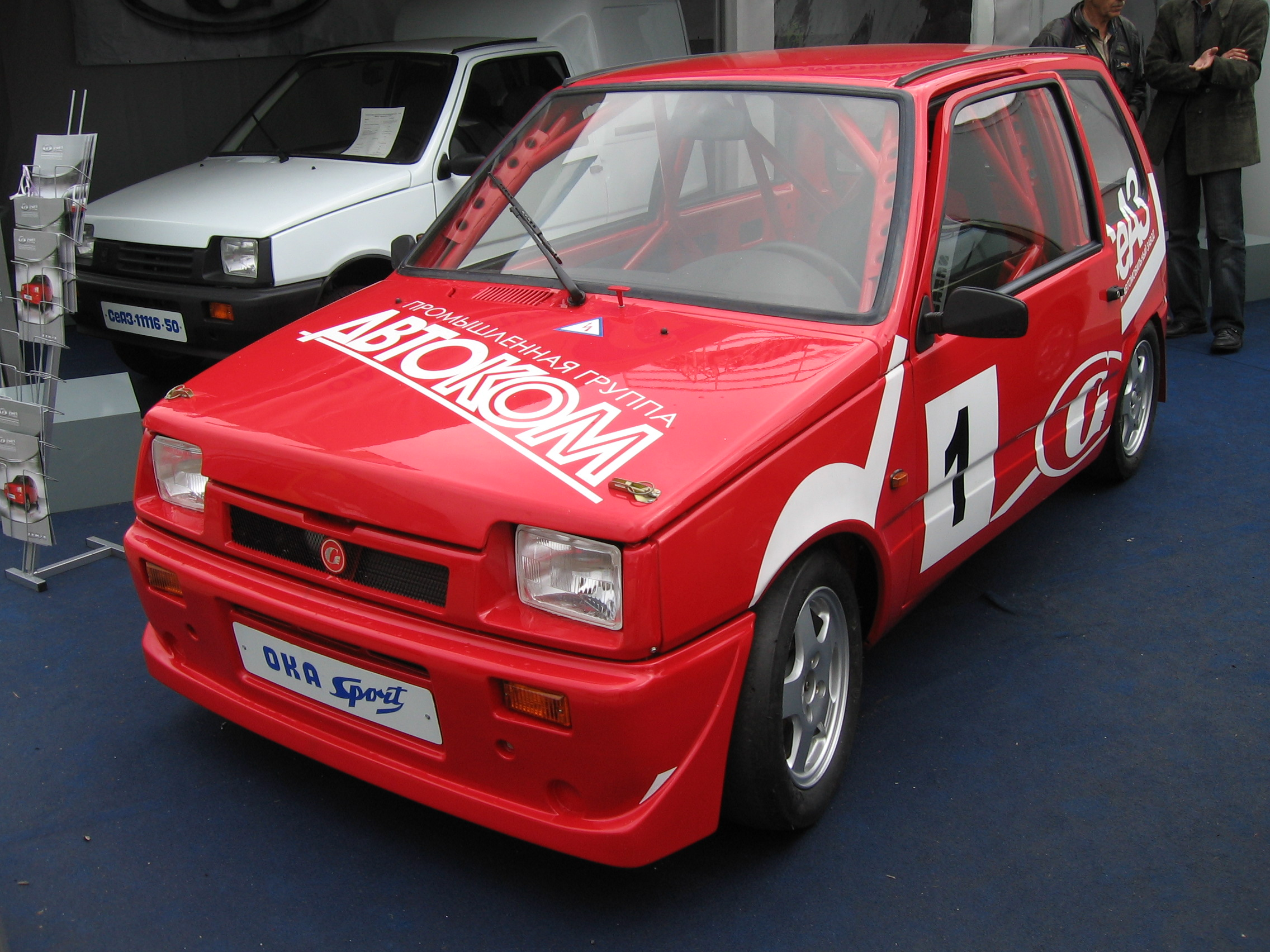
Oka Sport

Its road agility and acceleration rate (quite surprising for its appeal) prevented it from taking Zaporozhets' place in folklore (which takes its delight in the awkwardness and slow speed of the former).

Its small size and weight (635 kilograms), however, gave birth to a multitude of funny (and often true) stories involving several men carrying an Oka away from its parking place.

Special modifications for disabled people (missing one or both legs or one arm) were being distributed for free through the Soviet Union's (and later Russia's) social service system.

== United States ==
As of 2019, an American company called Oka Auto USA owned by MIROX, and located in Las Vegas, Nevada, offered electrically powered Okas for the US neighborhood electric vehicle (NEV) market called the Oka NEV ZEV. To conform to NEV regulations, the electric Oka's speed is limited to 25 mph (40 km/h).

== See also ==
- List of modern production plug-in electric vehicles
- TM 1131 - a compact economy car developed by JSC "Mishka-Tula-Moscow" (Rus:Мишка-Тула-Москва) a subsidiary of ZiL.
