= UAZ-469 =

Soviet military light utility vehicle

UAZ-469/3151/Hunter
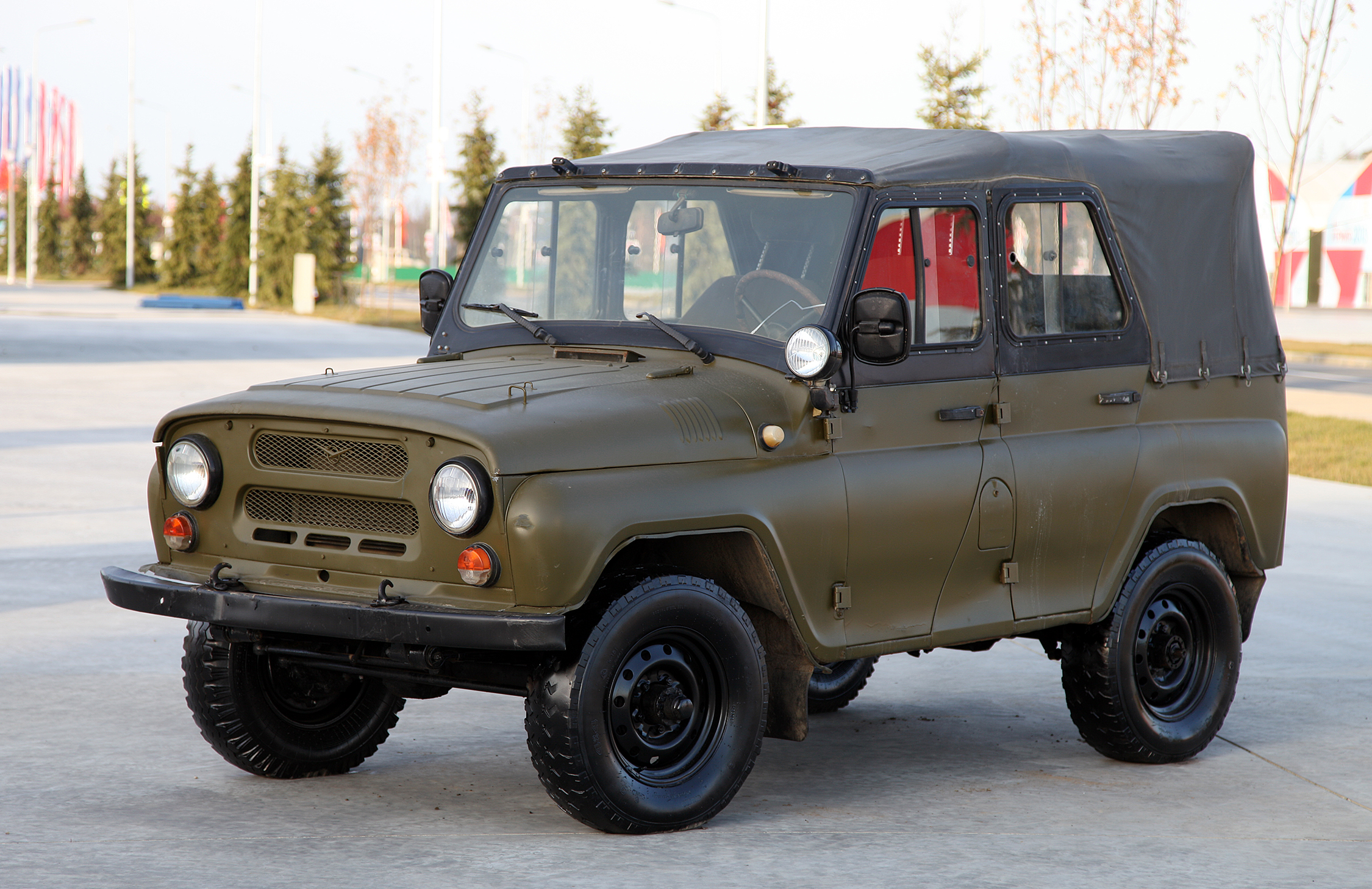
- UAZ-3151

Overview
- Manufacturer: UAZ
- Also called: UAZ-469 / UAZ-469B (1971–1985); UAZ-3151 / UAZ-31512 (1985–2003); UAZ Tundra 469 (West Germany, 1971–1991); UAZ Tigr (2005–2012); Baijah Taigah (Germany, 2003–2007); MWM Spartan (Czech Rep., 2020–2022)
- Production: 1971–present
- Assembly: Soviet Union / Russia: Ulyanovsk; Ukraine: Lutsk (LuAZ: 1999–2004); Germany: Bad Nauheim (Baijah Automotive: 2003–2007); Cuba: Camagüey (Empresa Reparadora José Smith Comas: 2003–20??); Azerbaijan: Ganja (Ganja Auto Plant: 2005–2008); Ukraine: Kremenchuk (KrASZ: 2004–2014); Vietnam: Hanoi (Thanh Xuan Industry Automobile-Motorbike Co.: 2003–present); Sudan: Port Sudan (2006–present); Czech Republic: Štěnovice (MW Motors: 2020–2022)
- Designer: Albert Rakhmanov

Body and chassis
- Body style: 4-door SUV
- Layout: Front-engine, four-wheel drive
- Related: Beijing BJ212

Powertrain
- Engine: 2445 cc UMZ 451 MI I4; 2693 cc I4
- Transmission: 4-speed or 5-speed manual

Dimensions
- Wheelbase: 2,380 mm (93.7 in)
- Length: 4,025 mm (158.5 in)
- Width: 1,785 mm (70.3 in)
- Height: 2,050 mm (80.7 in)
- Curb weight: 1,700 kg (3,747.9 lb)

Chronology
- Predecessor: GAZ-69
- Successor: UAZ Simbir

The UAZ-469, later sold as the UAZ-3151 and UAZ Hunter, is an off-road military light utility vehicle manufactured by UAZ since 1971. It was used by Soviet and other Warsaw Pact armed forces, as well as paramilitary units in Eastern Bloc countries. In the Soviet Union, it also saw widespread service in state organizations that needed a robust and durable off-road vehicle. Standard military versions included seating for seven personnel.

== History ==
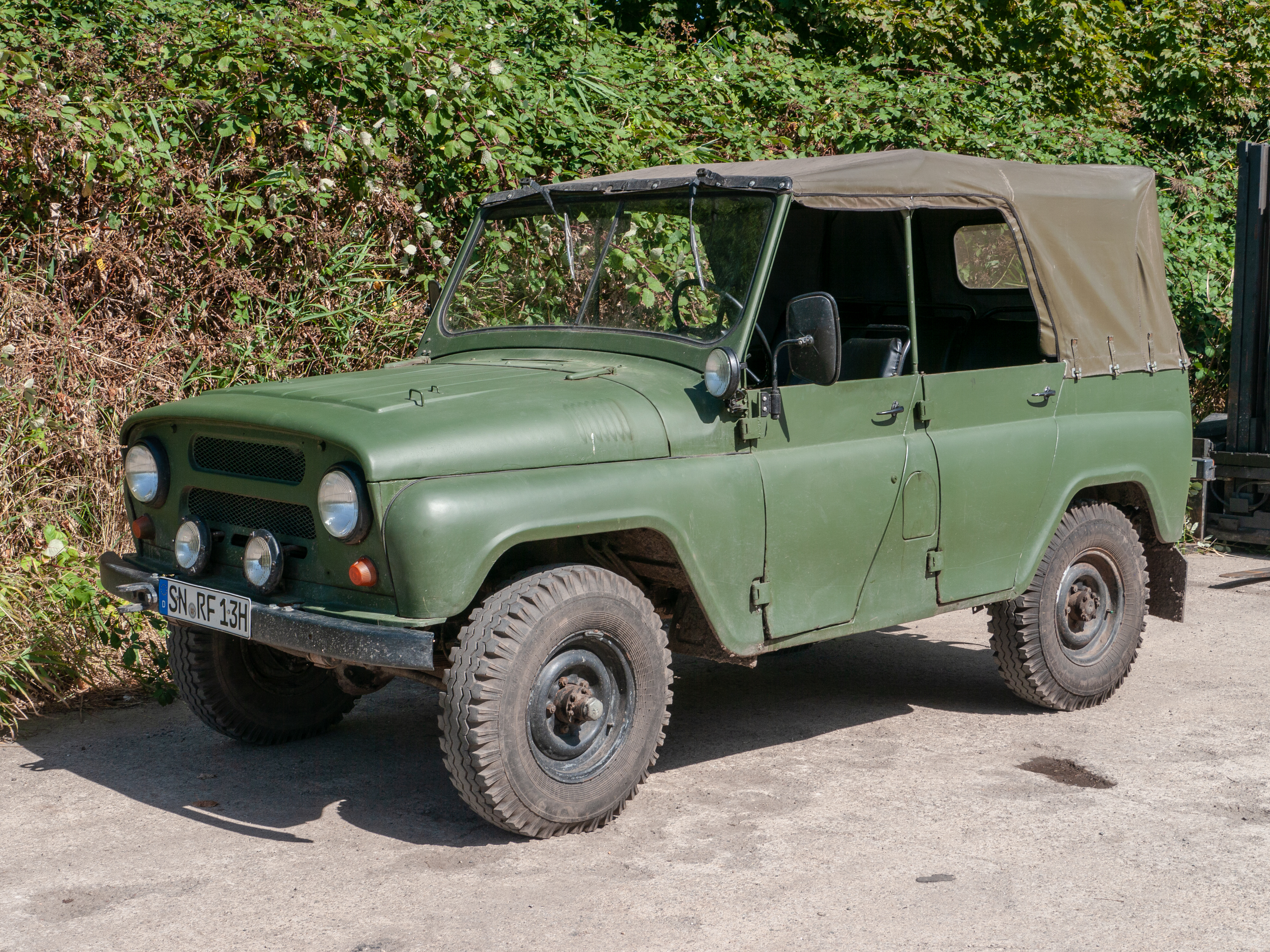
Early UAZ-469

In 1956, the Soviet Army ordered UAZ to design a successor for an outdated GAZ-69. At first the vehicle supposed to be amphibious and have a rear engine layout but later the order was simplified, and the car received a chassis of UAZ-450. The first prototypes were called UAZ-460 and had 400 mm of clearance, the model was proven to be prone to rollovers. Later the V4-powered unibody UAZ-471 was made, but its serial production required the plant reconstruction, so it was cancelled.

In 1961 the first UAZ-469 was made, it lowered to 300 mm of clearance and was powered by the same 75 hp (55 kW) 2,445 cc (149.2 cu in) UMZ-452MI inline-four engine as the UAZ-452 and is able to run on gasoline with an octane rating as low as 72 (although 76 was preferred). This engine was used in a variety of Soviet vehicles, including the GAZ-21 Volga passenger car. The UAZ-469 presented two great advantages: it was able to drive in virtually any terrain and it was very easy to repair.

Due to Soviet Union building expensive VAZ and KamAZ factories at the same time, UAZ-469 production was delayed and only began in 1971. At first, only a military version with ground clearance of 300 mm (12 in) entered the production, civilian UAZ-469B with clearance decreased to 220 mm (8.7 in) was introduced in 1973. The cars were mostly purchased by army and state agencies, but many were sold as surplus to private owners.

In 1974 three stock UAZ-469B became the first cars to ever conquer Mount Elbrus. The cars took 38 minutes to go 4200 m above sea level. The expedition was curated by the engineer of Nalchik High Mountain Geophysical Institute Aleksei Berberashvili, who previously drove 5600km up the Elbrus on a custom-made bike, becoming the first ever biker to conquer the mountain. Aside from expedition the cars that day were assisting in a rescue mission, bringing the emergency equipment to the people stuck on Elbrus. According to drivers, the engine power got shortened by approximately 40% but none of the cars broke down.

In 1980 the manufacturing of the hardtop version for Soviet Border Troops had begun, it received the name UAZ-31515 Burevestnik.

In 1985, due to new industry designation standards, modifications were renamed: the UAZ-469 became the UAZ-3151, while the UAZ-469B became the UAZ-31512. Newer models received a singular windshield with automated wipers, new lights, dual-circuit brake system, better heating and a modernized drivetrain.

In 1993 a civilian hardtop model UAZ-31514 entered the production, in 1997 its more powerful version, UAZ-31519, was introduced. In 1996 UAZ has made a stretched wheelbase model called Gusar, in 1999 its wider version called Bars was introduced, long wheelbase models were assembled in small batches. Also in 1996, UAZ introduced the UAZ-2315 pickup based on 31514. In 1999 UAZ began to assemble the short wheelbase Shalun.

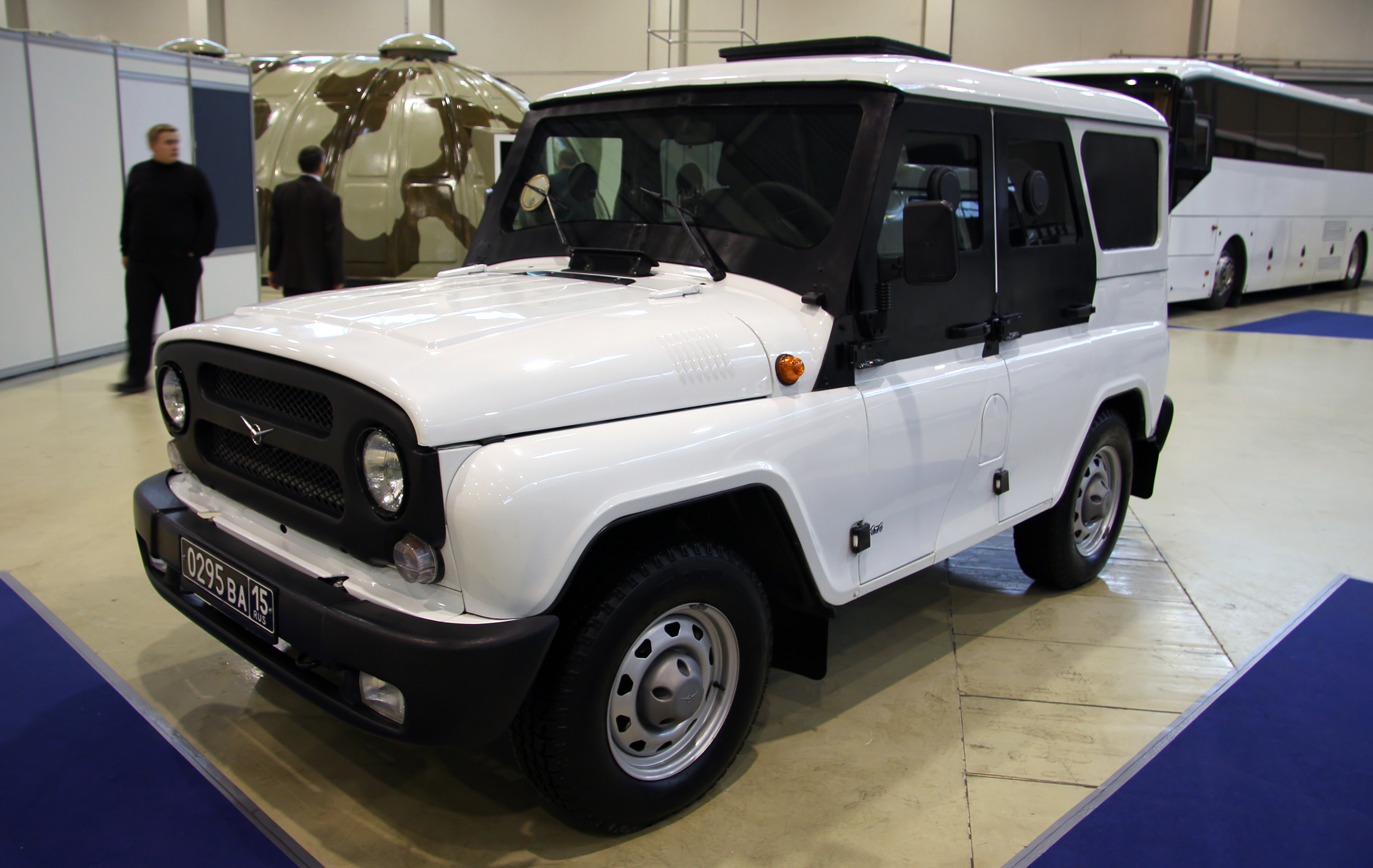
UAZ Hunter at Interpolitex 2011

In 2003 an updated version of the old UAZ-31514 was introduced to replace the base models, the new car was named UAZ Hunter. Manufacture of the UAZ-31512 for the Russian Army continued until 2011, while manufacture for the civilian market was discontinued in 2005 due to new emission standards.

The UAZ-469 and UAZ-3151 were exported to eighty countries, and between 1.65 to 2 million units of the vehicle and its variants were produced. The Hunter was originally sold in Germany and some Asian countries as the "UAZ Tigr" (Tiger), until General Motors complained that the name was too similar to the Opel Tigra, and in Germany, it was renamed "Baijah Taigah".

In 2010 in honor of the Victory Day UAZ launched a limited edition of Hunter under the original UAZ-469 nameplate.

June 4, 2010 UAZ Hunter set a world record of the biggest passenger capacity. In collaboration with Rumyantsev State School of Circus and Variety Art UAZ held an event where their car fitted 32 people including the driver. The weight of the passengers (including the driver) was 1900 kg and the car was able to drive the minimum required 10 meters with no people falling out of the car. UAZ Hunter has beaten the previous record of 23 people fitting into Kia Spectra and was featured in The Guinness Book of Records.

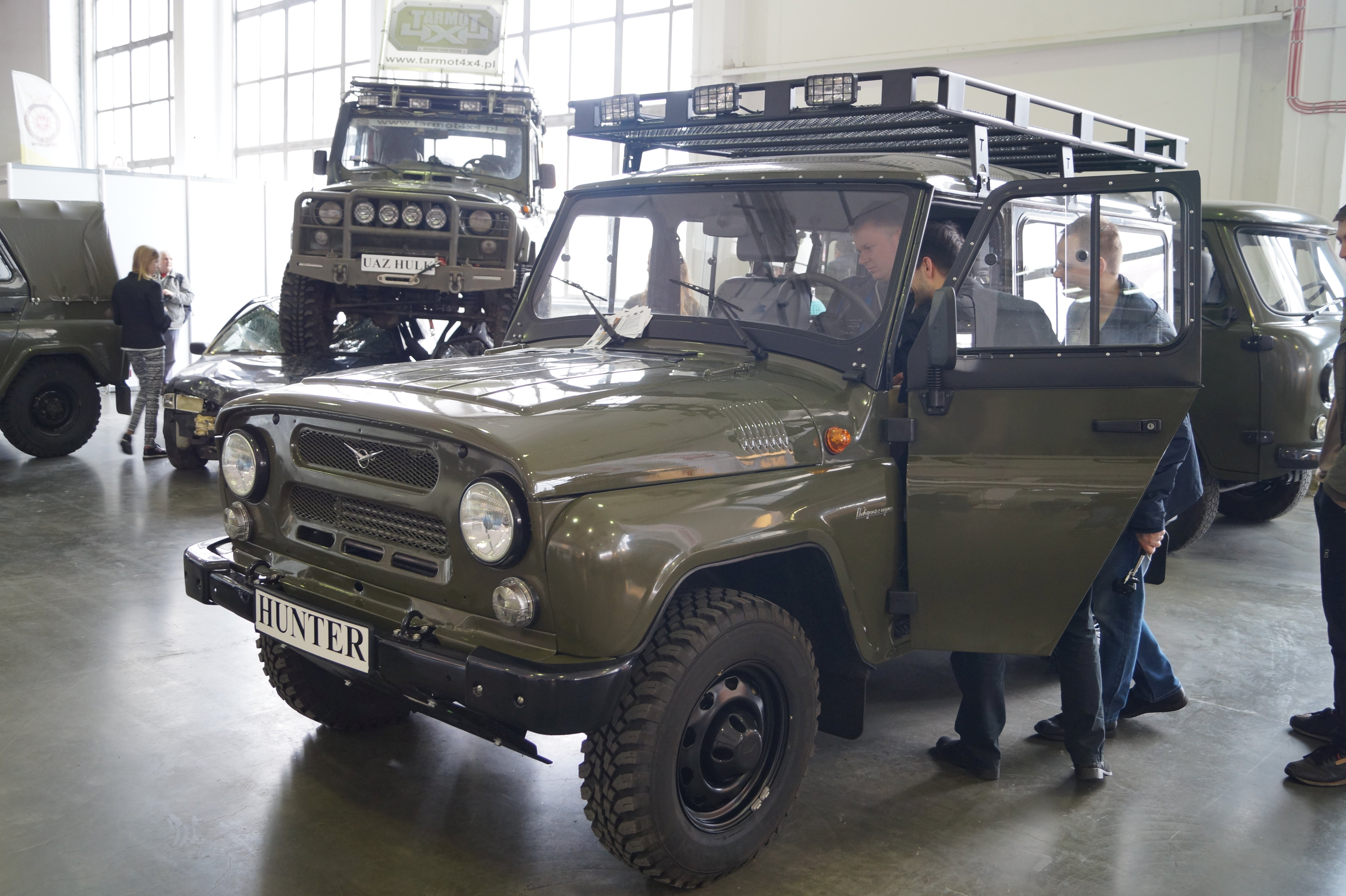
Post-facelift UAZ Hunter in Poznań

In 2011 UAZ Hunter underwent a facelift bringing back the classic bumpers and removing the plastic moldings, returning to the original look, similar to 2010 UAZ-469. Following the facelift UAZ launched a series of limited editions and special series.

In 2015 it was decided to discontinue the Hunter due to its outdated technology. In order to commemorate this and the Victory Day UAZ launched a limited 'Victory Series' with a livery inspired by the planes from the Soviet war drama Only "Old Men" Are Going Into Battle. The next year after the final edition the factory changed their decision and brought back UAZ Hunter back into production.

In 2017 to honor the model's 45th anniversary UAZ launched Hunter's special edition. It was available in teal and white color scheme and was limited to 469 copies referencing the car's original index.

In 2019 UAZ began to offer the Expedition version of Hunter. It was equipped with offroad bumper and a roof rack and was available exclusively in orange and black color scheme.

In 2021 Czech company MW Motors began the production of the electrified UAZ Hunter called Spartan. The project was introduced back in 2019, but its assembly got pushed back due to COVID-19 pandemic.

In 2022 to celebrate Hunter's 50th anniversary UAZ assembled 50 softtop cars under the original UAZ-469 nameplate, which was its first return since 2010.

Following Russia's full-scale invasion of Ukraine in 2022 UAZ was hit by western sanctions. The assembly of the original MWM Spartan had been stopped, eventually it got replaced by the Indian Force Gurkha. Due to the change of suppliers UAZ had to stop the assembly of the Expedition trims for 2023-2024.

== Specifications ==
The original version uses a 2.45-liter four-cylinder engine. From 2010 until 2013 it had a 2.7 L (2,693 cc) engine producing 112 hp (82 kW).

Engine
2,450 cc petrol, in-line 4-cylinder, water cooled, 75 hp (55 kW) at 4,000 rpm, 166.7 N⋅m (123.0 lb⋅ft) at 2,200 rpm
Fuel
Carburettor system, uses 76-octane petrol, tank capacity is 78 litres
Transmission
4-speed manual gearbox, 2-speed transfer case, 4-wheel drive
Front axle
Live axle with coil springs, drum brakes
Rear axle
Live axle with leaf springs, drum brakes

Dimensions and weights

- Empty weight with fuel: 1,650 kg (3,638 lb)
- Max. gross weight: 2,450 kg (5,401 lb)
- External dimensions: (length/width/height): 4,025 mm (158.5 in) × 1,785 mm (70.3 in) × 2,050 mm (80.7 in)
- Wheelbase: 2,380 mm (93.7 in)
- Tread front/rear: 1,453 mm (57.2 in)/1,453 mm (57.2 in)
- Ground clearance: 220 mm (8.7 in)
- Tire size: 215 SR 15
- Wheel size: 6L×15

== Modifications ==
- UAZ-469 / 3151 – specialized military UAZ-469, with ground clearance of 300 mm (12 in)
  - UAZ-469RKh – version modified for nuclear, biological, and chemical (NBC) resistance
  - UAZ-31515 Burevestnik – hardtop version for Soviet Border Troops
- UAZ-469B / 31512 – civilian version with ground clearance of 220 mm, longer PTO shafts and a single-stage main gear without the final drive. Available with a contact or contactless (on later models) electronic ignition system.
  - UAZ-469AP / 31512-UMM — Police patrol car version with an insulated five-door metal body and optional special equipment.
  - UAZ-469BI / 469BIT – 469B version with shielded electrical equipment (for example, P-403M microwave transceiver VHF radio)
  - UAZ-469BG / 3152 – medical utility version, equipped with places for nurses and a stretcher; modernized and renamed in 1985.
- UAZ-31514 / Hunter – hardtop version, modernized and renamed in 2003. Became a base model in 2005.
  - UAZ-31519 – more powerful version of the hardtop model
  - UAZ-2315 – pickup version
- UAZ-3150 Shalun – a short wheelbase (2000mm) version with removable roof and doors
- UAZ-3153 Gusar – long wheelbase model (2760mm)
  - UAZ-3159 Bars – wider version of the long wheelbase model

=== Special Editions ===
- UAZ-Martorelli – UAZ-469B version that was exported to Italy, where it was significantly modified. These versions included:
  - UAZ-Explorer – with Russian UMP-451M petrol engine (2,445 cc, 75 hp)
  - UAZ-Marathon – with a Peugeot XD2 diesel (2,498 cc, 76 hp)
  - UAZ-Dakar – with a turbodiesel Vittorio Martorelli VM Motori (2,400 cc, 100 hp)
  - UAZ-Racing – with a Fiat petrol engine (1,995 cc, 112 hp)
- Baijah Taigah – UAZ Hunter version that was exported to Germany
  - Active – 4-door hardtop
  - Cabrio – 4-door softtop
  - Pickup – 2-door pickup
- Vallarta Kit – special package available in Mexico, named after the beach resort of Puerto Vallarta. Features a winch, steering assembly and gearbox reinforcement, snorkel, suspension kit and LED headlights.
- UAZ Hunter Expedition – special package with offroad bumper and a roof rack.
- UAZ-469 (2010) – limited edition to commemorate the Victory Day
- UAZ Hunter Beach (2011) – limited edition with roll cage
- UAZ Hunter Expedition (2011) – limited edition with snorkel and a roof rack, not to be confused with 2019 special package
- UAZ Hunter Trophy (2013) – limited edition with sturdy steering arm and a tie down hook
- UAZ Hunter Victory Series (2015) – limited edition to commemorate the Victory Day
- UAZ Hunter Jungle Edition (2016) – limited edition with lifted suspension
- UAZ Hunter 45th Anniversary (2017) – limited edition to celebrate model's anniversary
- UAZ-469 50th Anniversary (2022) – limited edition to celebrate model's anniversary

== Vehicles based on UAZ Hunter ==
- UAZ-3907 Jaguar – amphibious vehicle based on the UAZ-469 with two propellers mounted to the rear axle
- R-125B1 / R125B2 – command and control vehicle with radio station
- UAZ-469 WZMot-4 – Polish ambulance version with stretched patient compartment, upgraded from UAZ-469BG
- UAZ-3151T – topography vehicle
- Barsuk – mobile communication node
- Vest – chassis for 9M133 Kornet
- TREKOL-39041 – amphibious vehicle based on UAZ-469B
  - TREKOL-39294 – variant with low–pressure tires
- MWM Spartan – Czech electric vehicle

== Military operators ==
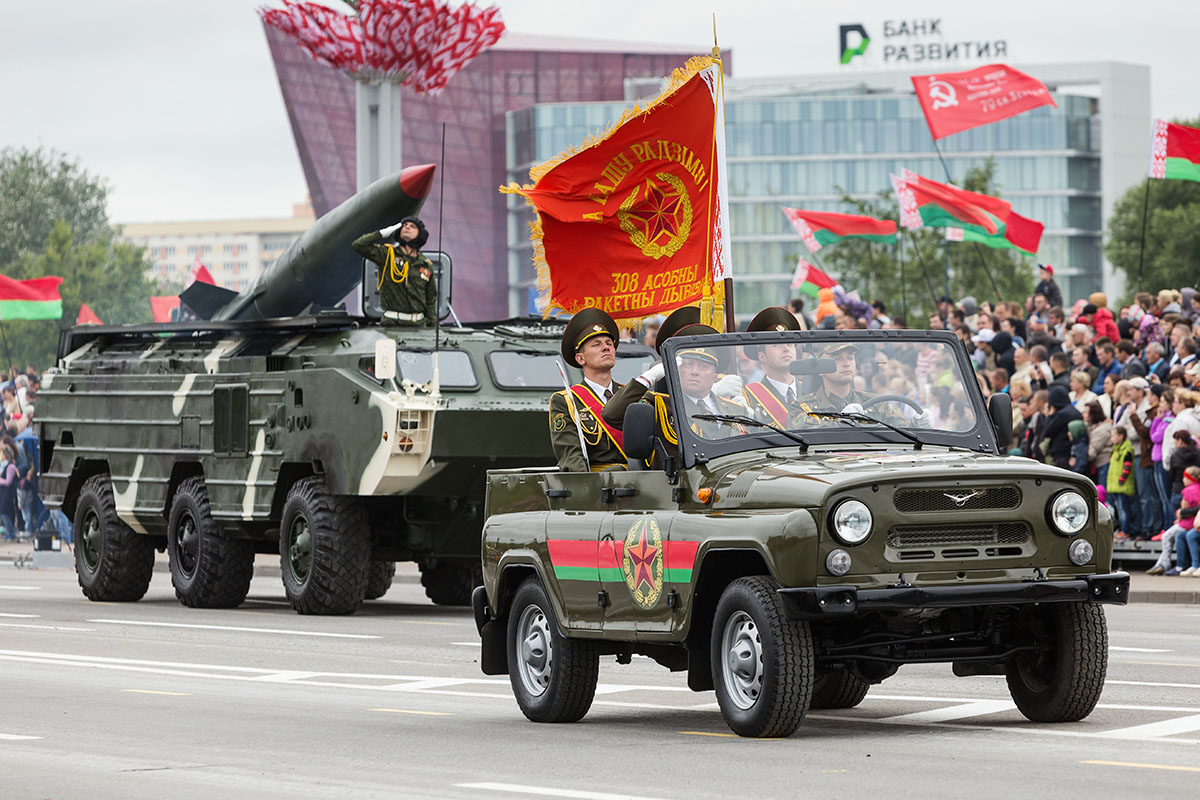
A UAZ-3151 on parade in Minsk, July 2017.

- Afghanistan
- Albania
- Algeria
- Angola
- Armenia
- Azerbaijan
- Belarus
- Bulgaria
- Cambodia
- Cuba
- Georgia
- Ghana
- Hungary
- Iraq
- Ivory Coast
- Kazakhstan
- Kyrgyzstan
- Laos
- Libya
- Moldova
- Mongolia
- Mozambique
- Nicaragua
- North Korea
- Poland
- Romania
- Russia
- Syria
- Tajikistan
- Transnistria
- Turkmenistan
- Ukraine
- Uruguay
- Uzbekistan
- Vietnam
- Yemen

=== Former military operators ===
- Afghanistan
- Czech Republic
- Czechoslovakia
- East Germany
- Egypt
- Islamic State
- Iran: Bought in the 1970s and retired in the 1990s.
- Lebanon: Used by the Lebanese Armed Forces and some Lebanese militias during the Lebanese Civil War (1975–1994).
- Mali
- Somalia: Bought in the 1970s, all were lost during the Somali Civil War.
- Slovakia
- Soviet Union: Passed on to successor states.

== Service history ==
- Yom Kippur War
- Lebanese Civil War
- Angolan Civil War
- Mozambican Civil War
- South African Border War
- Soviet–Afghan War
- Iran–Iraq War
- United States invasion of Grenada
- Persian Gulf War
- Transnistrian War
- First Nagorno-Karabakh War
- First Chechen War
- Second Chechen War
- War in Afghanistan (2001–2021)
- Iraq War
- Libyan crisis
- Syrian civil war
- Russo-Ukrainian War
  - War in Donbas
  - Russian invasion of Ukraine
- Second Nagorno-Karabakh War

== Gallery ==
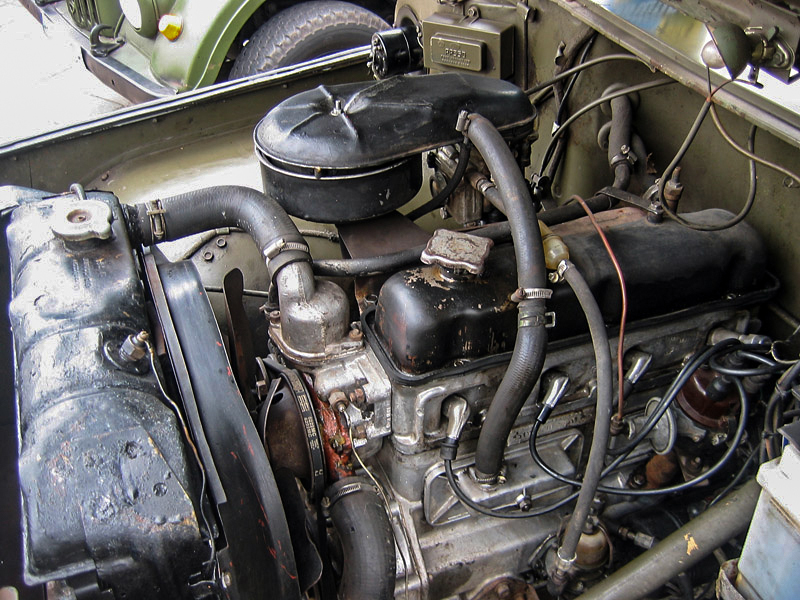
UMP-4178 engine for the UAZ-469

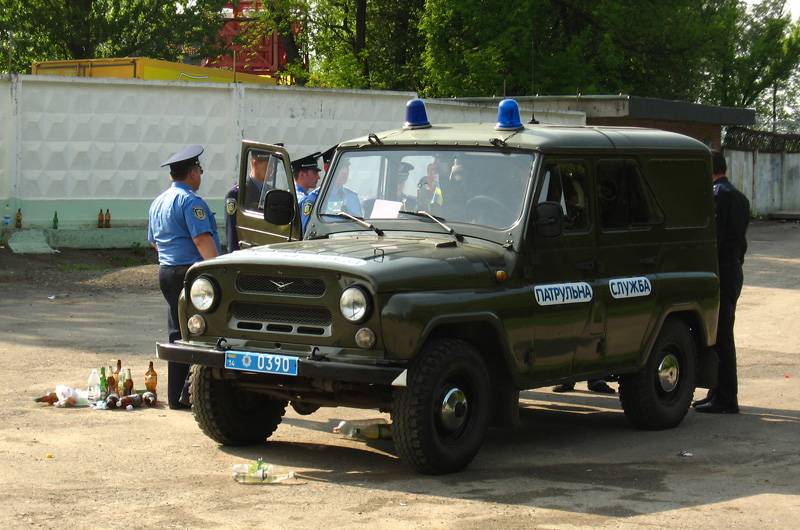
Ukrainian police UAZ-3151 UMM

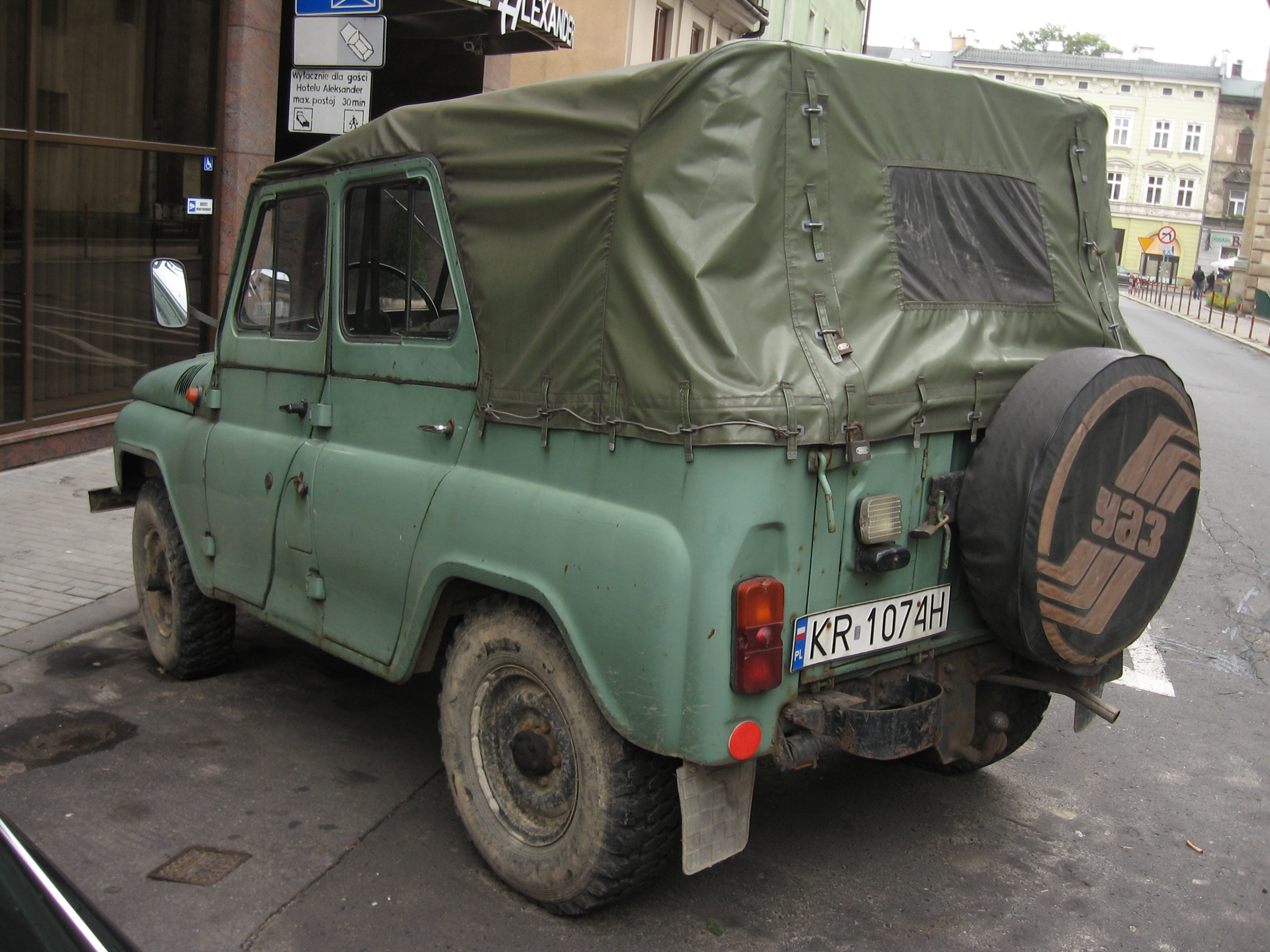
UAZ-469 on Garbarska street in Kraków

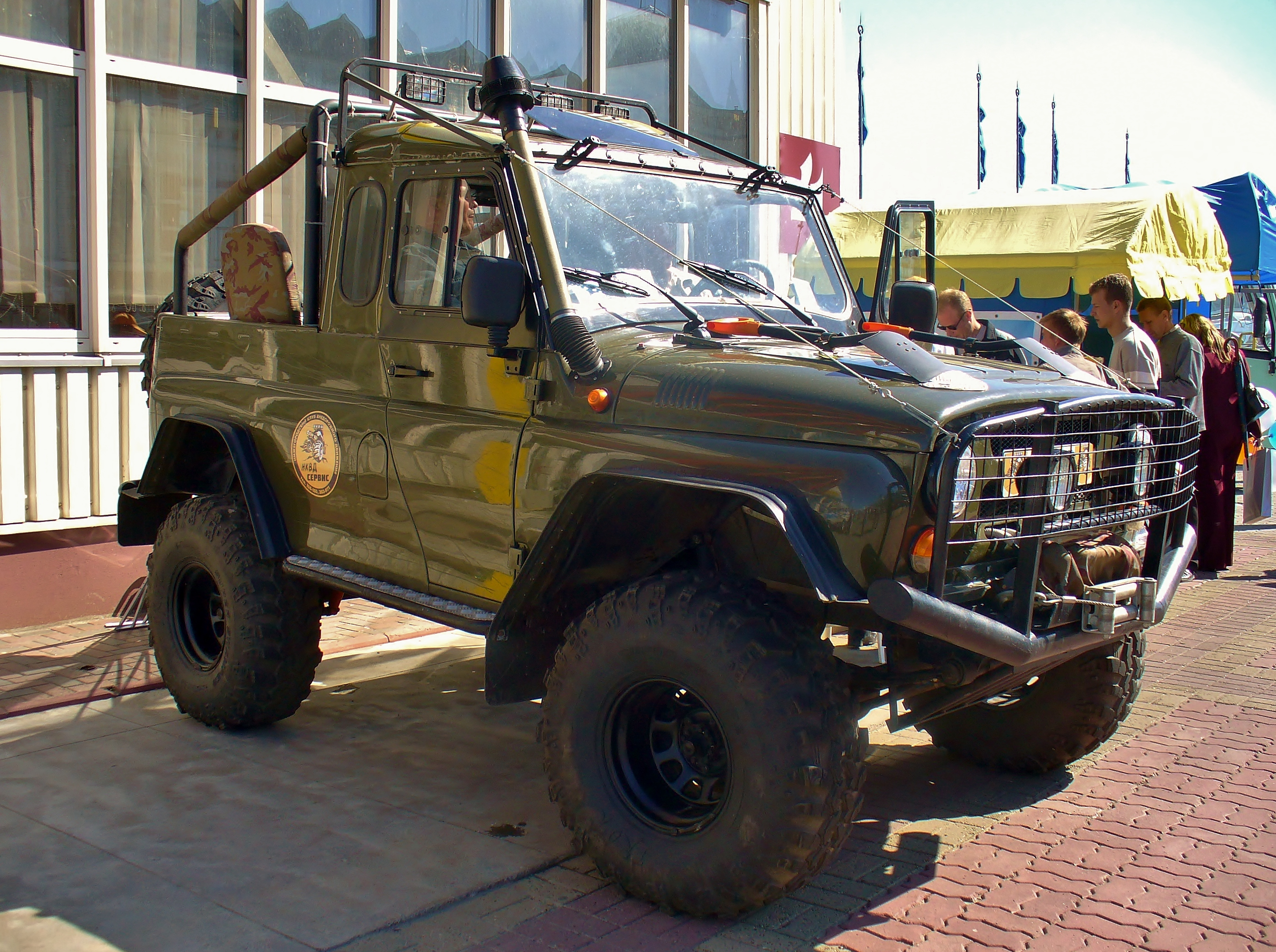
UAZ-3150 aka UAZ Sport

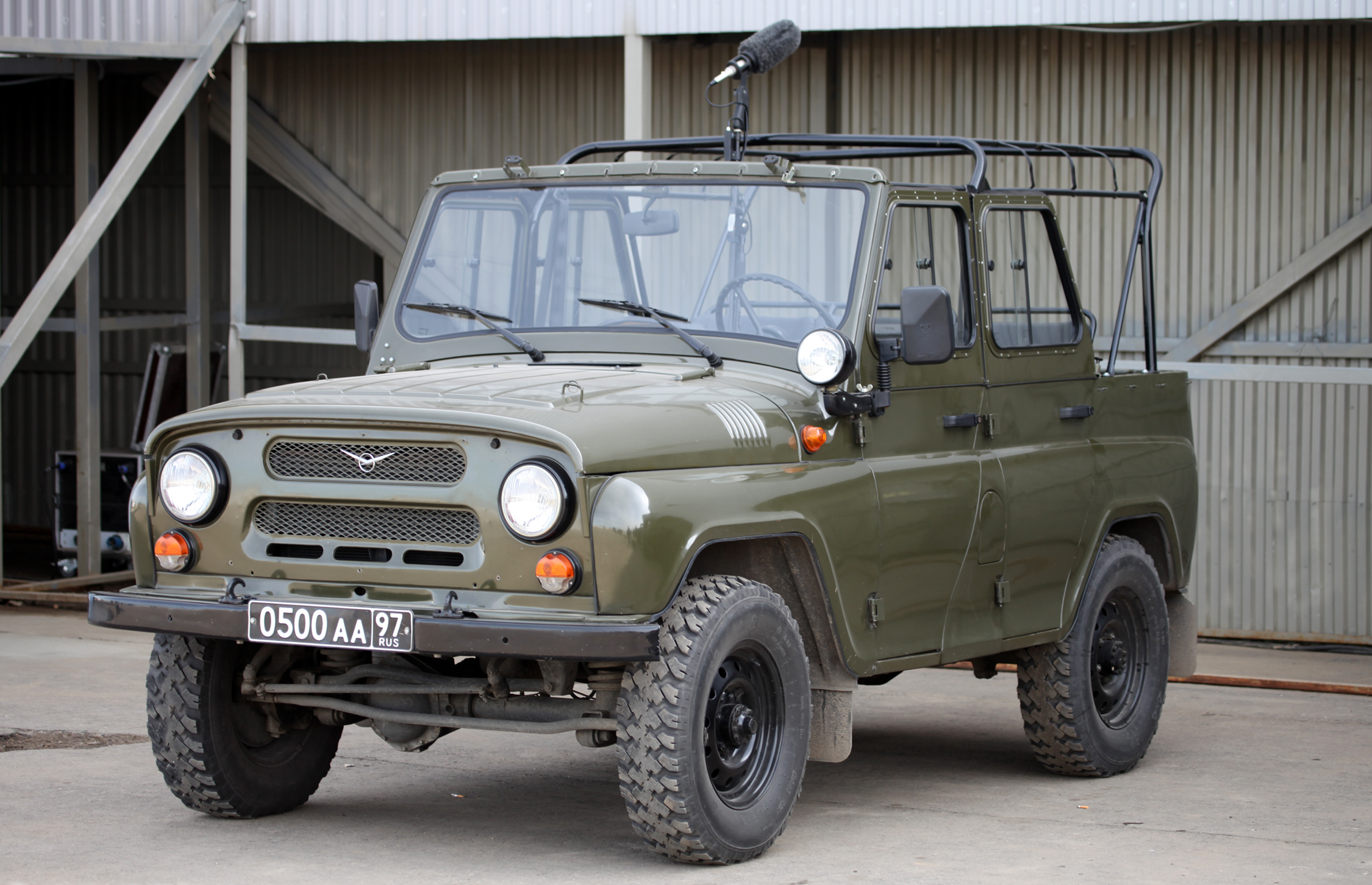
UAZ-469 with open top

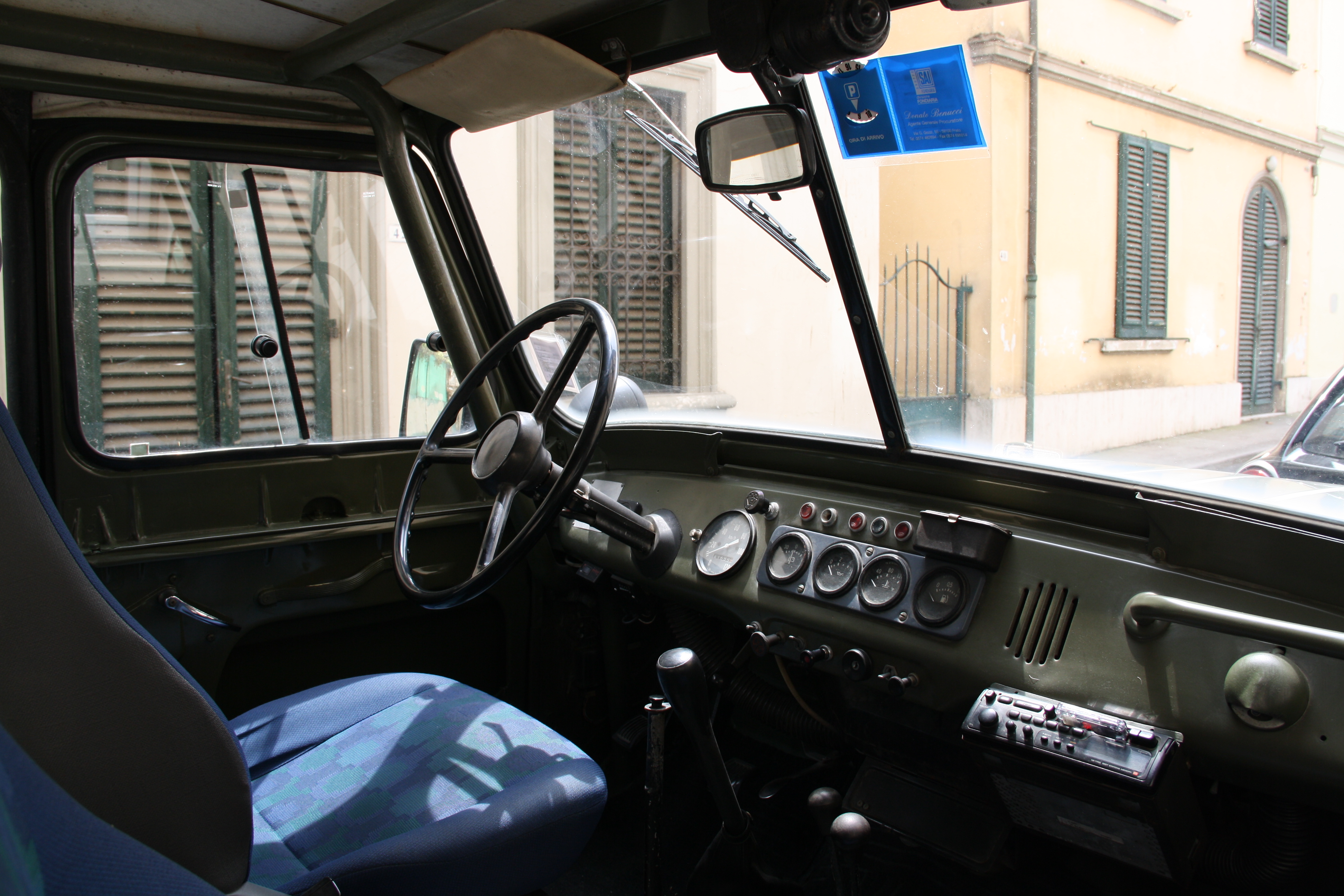
UAZ-469 interior

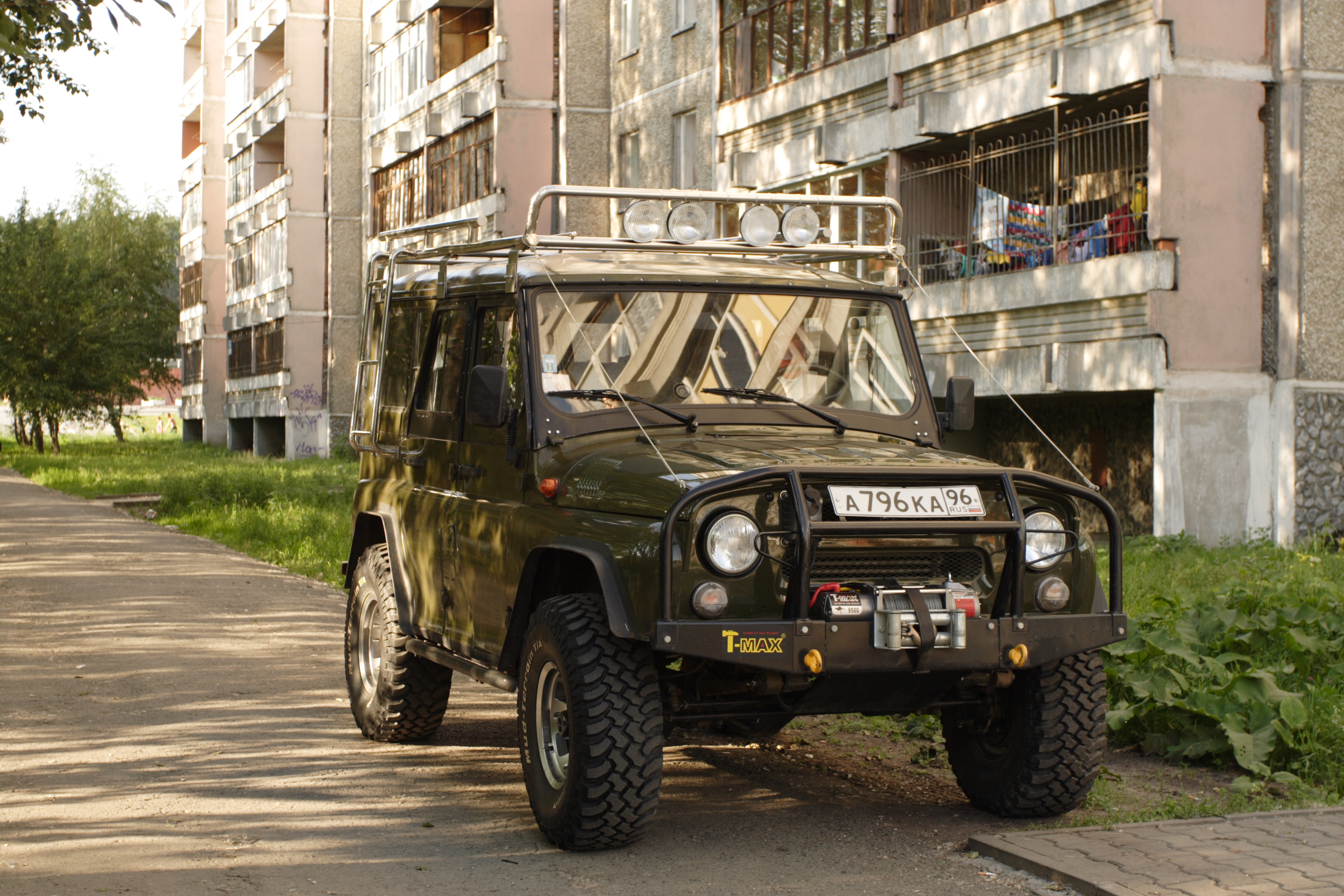
UAZ Hunter with equipment

== See also ==
- Beijing Auto Works BJ-212, a Chinese off-road vehicle based on the UAZ-469
- Willys MB, the US off-road vehicle of World War II.
- Lada Niva, similar SUV from AvtoVAZ
- Lada Niva Travel
- UAZ Patriot

== Bibliography ==
- Foss, Christopher F.; Gander, Terry J., eds. (1999). Jane's Military Vehicles and Logistics, 1999-2000. Jane's Information Group. ISBN 978-0-7106-1912-9.
- Kassis, Samer (2019). Invasion of Lebanon 1982. Abteilung 502. ISBN 978-84-120935-1-3.
- Sex, Zachary; Abi-Chahine, Bassel (2021). Modern Conflicts 2 – The Lebanese Civil War, From 1975 to 1991 and Beyond. Modern Conflicts Profile Guide. Vol. II. AK Interactive. EAN 8435568306073.
