= TM 1131 =

The TM 1131 "Туляк" (Ru:Tula) or "Мишка" (Ru:Mishka "Bear") is a compact economy car developed by JSC "Mishka-Tula-Moscow" (Rus:Мишка-Тула-Москва) a subsidiary of ZiL.

It is envisaged that with bodies: wagon, van and pickup truck. Construction: supporting metal space frame with plastic body panels.

The TM 1131 uses components and assemblies of the GAZ Gazelle, VAZ Oka, ZAZ Tavria and VAZ.

The TM 1131 visually reminiscent of the VAZ Oka.

== Specifications ==
- Body Types: 2-doors. Van, 2-doors. Pickup, 3-dv. Hatchback
- Engine: MeMZ (Ukrainian Melitopol) 4-cylinder, V - 1299 injector
  - power - 1.2L with 64 hp or 1.3L with 70 hp,
  - fuel - petrol RON 92 - RON 95, EURO-3
- Mass and dimensions
  - Length: 3330 mm
  - Width: 1575 mm
  - Height: 1442 mm
  - Ground clearance: 185 mm
- Wheelbase: 2280 mm
- Max. speed: 130 km/h
- Fuel consumption: 5.8 L per 100 km

== See also ==
- VAZ Oka
- APAL Stalker, a similarly manufactured SUV
