= Baijah Automotive =

Defunct German automotive manufacturer

Baijah Automotive GmbH is a former car manufacturer from Germany. The company was founded in 2003 by Marcus Nöske and was located in Bad Nauheim. It specialized in the assembly of off-road vehicles. The parts for its licensed models were produced from UAZ. Baijah was a technical supplier for the UN.

The company had financial difficulties. It was sold in 2007 to an investor that refused the total legal consequence. The founder's family fell into private bankruptcy and the investor got the name of the Baijah brand.

Offered models:

- 2003–2007: Baijah Taigah Active / Cabrio / UN vehicles
- 2007–2012: Baijah Tulos Pickup / Station / UN vehicles
- 2007–2012: Baijah Stalker (APAL Stalker)
