= APAL Stalker =

Russian light SUV

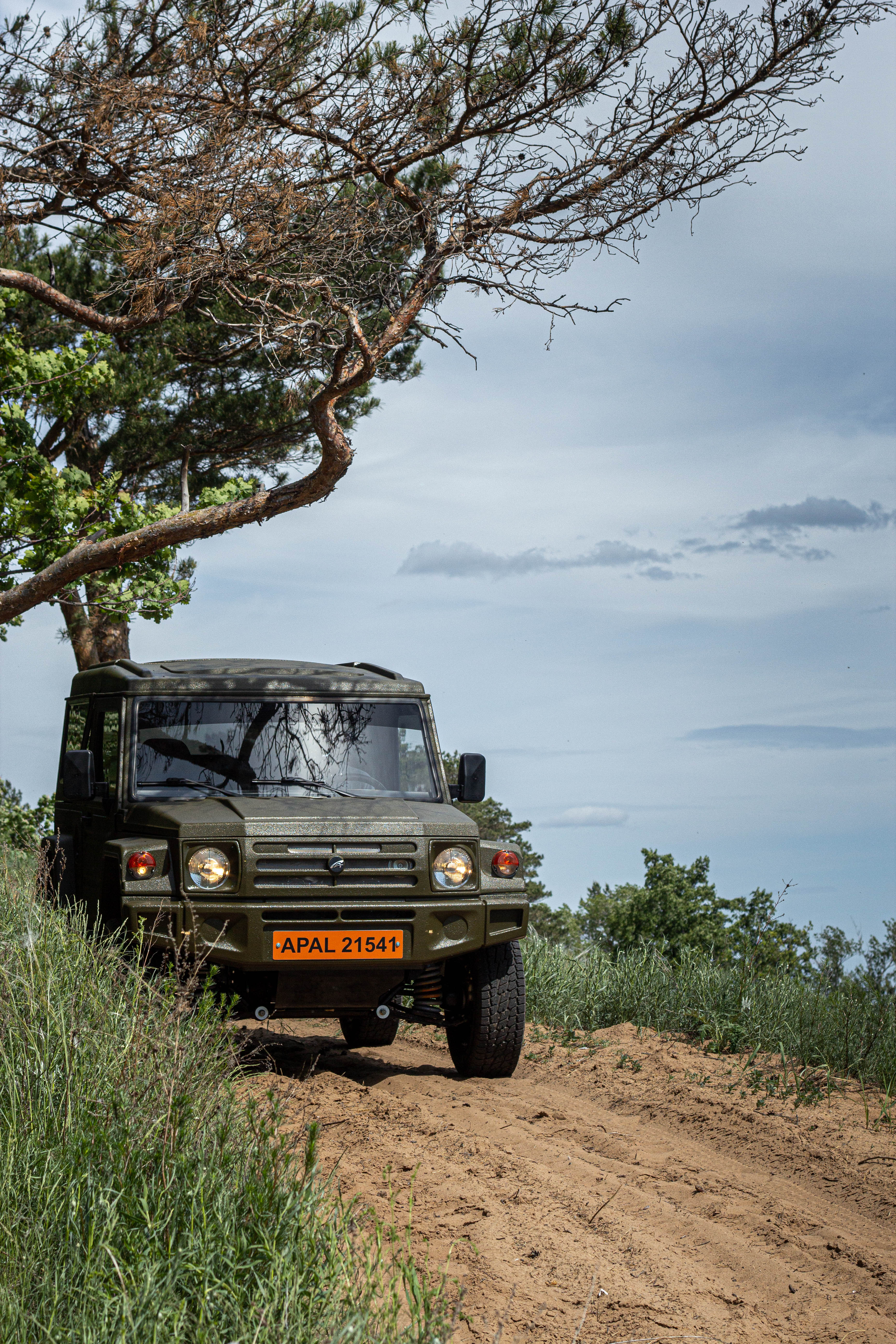
APAL 21541

The APAL-21541 Сталкер (Stalker) is a Russian light SUV, originally assembled using the parts and mechanicals of Zhiguli cars. It was developed in the city of Togliatti, Russia, by APAL (Ru:АПАЛ), a Russian automotive industries plastic parts supplier, in 2003 . It was designed by Alexander Lyinsky and Sergey Nekrasov.

The original rear-wheel drive APAL-2154 was built from 2003 to 2006 while its 4x4 APAL-21541 successor is built from 2006 to the present.

The Stalker utilises a space frame covered with plastic panels, using Lada Niva chassis and mechanicals.

The Stalker was planned to be manufactured in ChechenAvto's Argun plant.

== Specifications ==
Estimated price: 370 000 Rubles

Length x width x height = 3590mmx1560mmx1640mm

Number of seats = 4

Cargo Volume = ND

Curb weight = 950 kg

Gross weight = 1665 kg

Engine = I4 VAZ VAZ-21214 Gasoline 8-valve with multiple injection, 1.7 liter

Power = 82 hp at 5000 rev / min

Torque = 130 Nm at 3600 r / min

Transmission = a manual five-speed

Drive = rear or full, depending on customer requirements

Maximum speed = 130 km/h

Acceleration = 0–100 km/h in 13.6

Fuel consumption = unk

Tank volume = 42 l

Fuel Type = gasoline AI-95 (unleaded)

== Models ==
- APAL 2154 - original version
- APAL-21541 - a light four-wheel drive SUV is assembled on the basis of components and assemblies of the VAZ-2121 4 "Niva". Equipped with 1.7-liter gasoline engine with a capacity of 80 hp

== Variants ==
Travec Tecdrah TTi - German manufacture Travec uses an enlarged APAL Stalker body-on-space frame using the Dacia Duster mechanical and an 80 horsepower 1.5 dCi engine.

German company Baijah Automotive imported a modified version as the Baijah Stalker.

== See also ==
- TM 1131, a similarly manufactured small car
