= SMZ cyclecar =

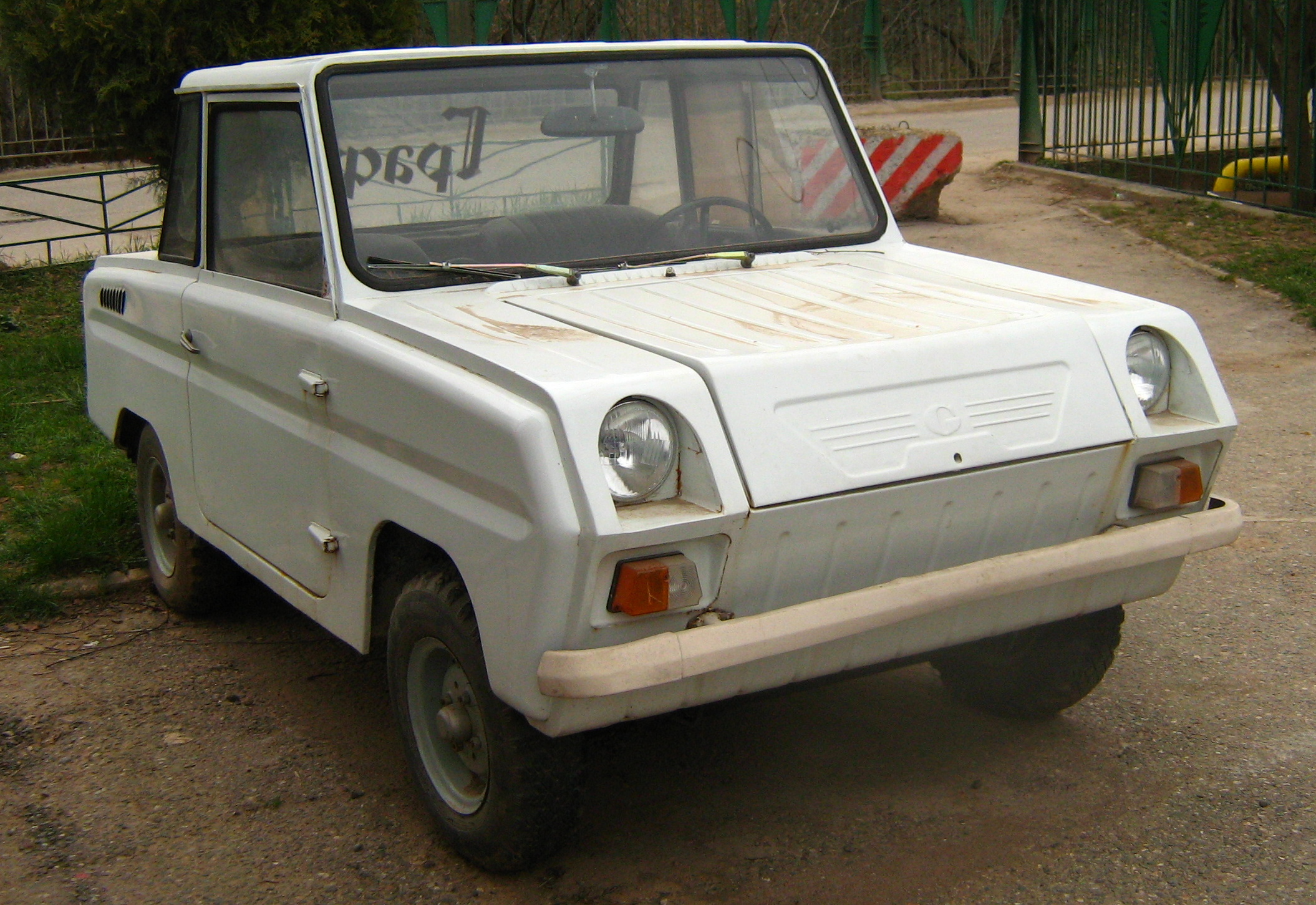

Overview
- Manufacturer: SeAZ
- Production: 1958-1971 (S3A); 1970-1997 (S3D)

Body and chassis
- Class: City car
- Layout: Rear-engine, rear-wheel-drive

Powertrain
- Transmission: 4-speed manual

Dimensions
- Wheelbase: 1700 mm
- Length: 2825 mm
- Width: 1380 mm
- Height: 1300 mm
- Curb weight: 480-598 kg

The SMZ was a Soviet cyclecar or microcar, manufactured in Serpukhov, Russia, by Serpukhov Motor Works (Russian: Серпуховский Мотозавод, Serpukhovskiy Motozavod), later known as the now-defunct SeAZ. The most common models were the S-3A and S-3D. They were specially designed for disabled drivers and were distributed in the USSR for free or at a large discount through the Soviet Union's social welfare system, and were not officially sold to non-disabled people. The S-3A-M was produced between 1958 and 1970. It was powered by a 346 cc single-cylinder two-stroke engine, giving 10 hp (7 kW) and a top speed of 55 km/h (34 mph).

The S-3D, produced between 1970 and 1997, was a twin-seat, four-wheeled cyclecar, 2.825 metres (111.2 in) in length, but rather heavy (≈500 kg) due to its all-steel body. It was powered by an 18 hp (13 kW) IZH-P3 air-cooled two-stroke engine.

In the USSR, the model was commonly known as a "motor-wheelchair" (Russian: инвалидка, invalidka) because they were only leased via the social care system to disabled people for five years without permission to sell (in a similar way to the British Invacars, made by AC, Thundersley and Tippen). After five years of use, a lessee had to return his "motor-wheelchair" to the social care organisations and was given a new one.

As with the Invacars, not all invalidkas were scrapped, because some of their lessees have registered them as their private property. However they remain rare and earlier models especially so and have become collector's items.

Since the 1980s, the use of SMZ cars has been in decline because disabled drivers prefer to use conventional cars with modified controls: Zaporozhets models, for instance, or the later VAZ-1111 "Oka", which were sold to them at substantial discounts. The last 300 S-3Ds left the SeAZ factory as late as autumn 1997.

S-3D production was discontinued without a direct replacement. The VAZ-1111 "Oka", which filled this role later, was a much larger, four-seater car.

== S-3A specifications ==
- Weight – 500 kg (1,102 lb)
- Length – 2,667 mm (105.0 in)
- Max velocity – 55 km/h (34 mph)
- cylinder – 346 cc, 72 mm (2.8 in) in diameter
- max power – 10 hp (7 kW)

== S-3D specifications ==
- Weight – 454 kg (1,001 lb)
- Dimensions – 2595 mm 102in(length) x 1380 mm 54in(width) x 1350 mm 53in(height)
- Track width – 1,114 mm (43.9 in)
- Wheelbase – 1,700 mm (66.9 in)
- Min turning radius – 3,8 – 4,2 m
- Max velocity – 55 km/h (34 mph)
- Fuel consumption – 7.0 litres per 100 kilometres (40 mpg_{‑imp}; 34 mpg_{‑US})
- Engine – IZH-P3-01, located in the rear
  - cylinder – 346 cc, 72 mm (2.8 in) in diameter
  - piston stroke – 85 mm (3.3 in)
  - max power – 18 hp (13 kW)
  - compression index – 7,5–8
- four-stage gearbox

== Welfare cars ==
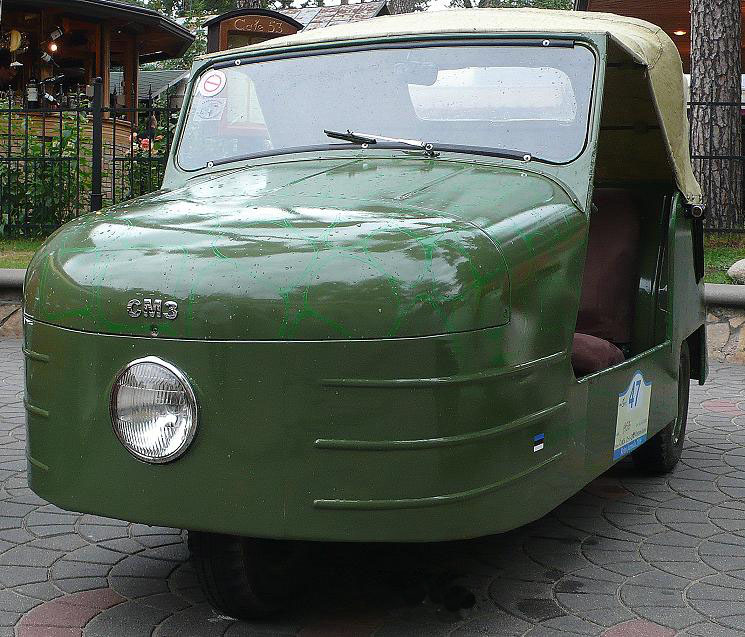
SMZ S-1L

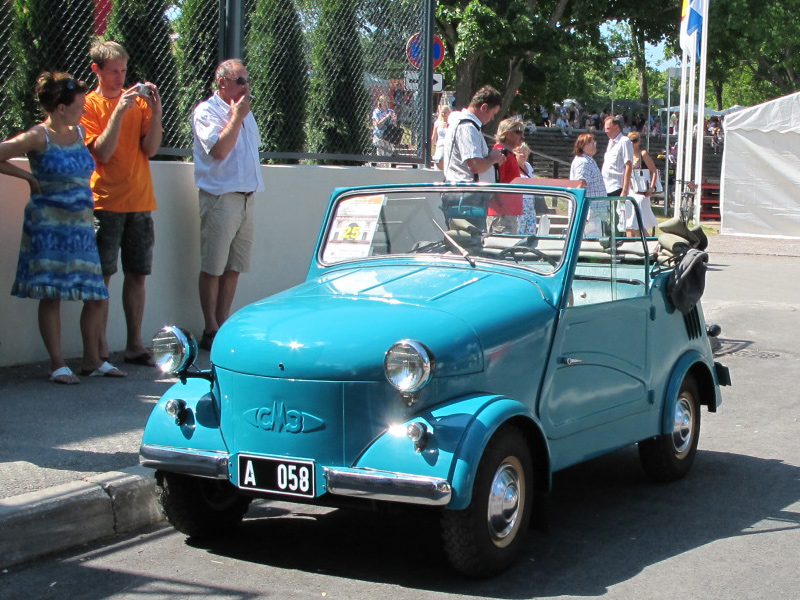
SMZ S-3A

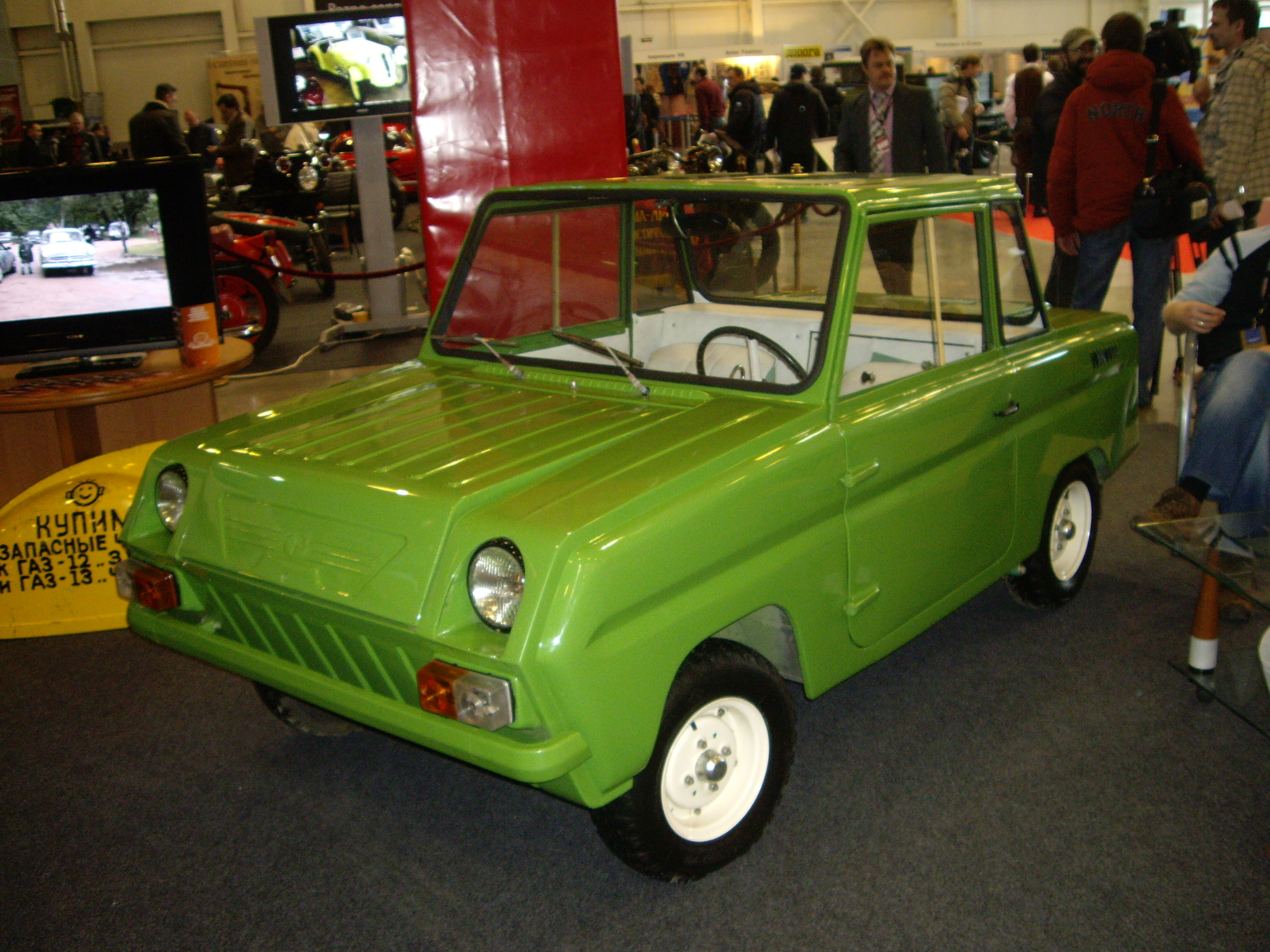
SMZ S3D

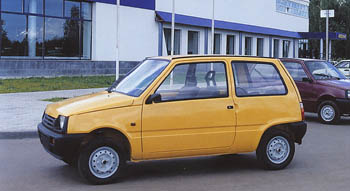
SeAZ Oka

== See also ==
- List of cyclecars by country of origin
- List of microcars by country of origin
