= SeAZ =

Automobile assembly plant in Russia

- Native name: ОАО «Серпуховский автомобильный завод»
- Type: Open joint-stock company
- Industry: Automotive
- Founded: 7 July 1939
- Defunct: 2013
- Headquarters: Serpukhov, Moscow Oblast, Russia
- Key people: Artur Miller, bankruptcy manager
- Products: Cyclecars, VAZ-1111 Oka
- Revenue: circa $ 85 000 000
- Number of employees: circa 50
- Parent: PLC Tsentrotorg
- Website: seaz.ru

SeAZ (Russian: Серпуховский автомобильный завод, romanized: Serpukhovsky Avtomobilny Zavod, lit. 'Serpukhov Automobile Plant') was a large engineering plant in Serpukhov, Moscow Oblast, Russia. From 1939 to 1995, the company was called SMZ (Serpukhov Motorcycle Plant) and produced various cyclecars for use by disabled drivers, usually powered by IZh motorcycle engines. Between 1991 and 2008 it also produced Lada Oka microcars developed by AvtoVAZ. The company was declared bankrupt in 2013.

== History ==
The company was founded on July 7, 1939, by an order of the People's Commissariat for General Automotive Industry and by the head of Glavmotoveloprom, concerning production of small-capacity motorcycles.

Since the beginning of the 1980s, the factory entered a period of development: the prototype of a new car was designed and produced, and was named "Oka". It anticipated the car produced nowadays.

In 1985, the Council of Ministers of the Soviet Union issued a decree "On the creation of new capacities for the production of the new model of a microcar at the AvtoVAZ and KamAZ plants and at the Serpukhov Motorcycle Plant of the Soviet Ministry of the Automotive Industry".

The Serpukhov plant was significantly rebuilt for the new tasks. The leading Soviet enterprises, as well as some foreign companies such as Dürr AG, Bollhoff and PPG, were entrusted with the equipment for production and assembly. In 1989, the plant started assembling cars of the extra-small class. At the same time, it was integrated into the AvtoVAZ corporation.

In 1995, AvtoVAZ fully transferred the assembly of the Oka microcar to SMZ. In 2005, the SeAZ stock company became a member of the Avtokom industrial group. Production of the Oka ended in 2007. The company has subsequently stated that it has no plans to resume car production.

After the company's bankruptcy, the factory site was turned into the Serpukhov Industrial Park.

== Welfare cars ==
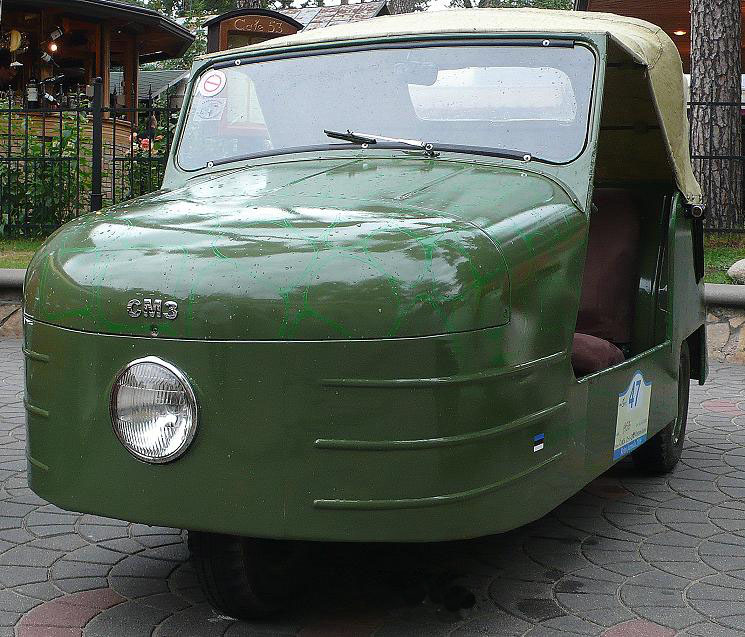
SMZ S-1L

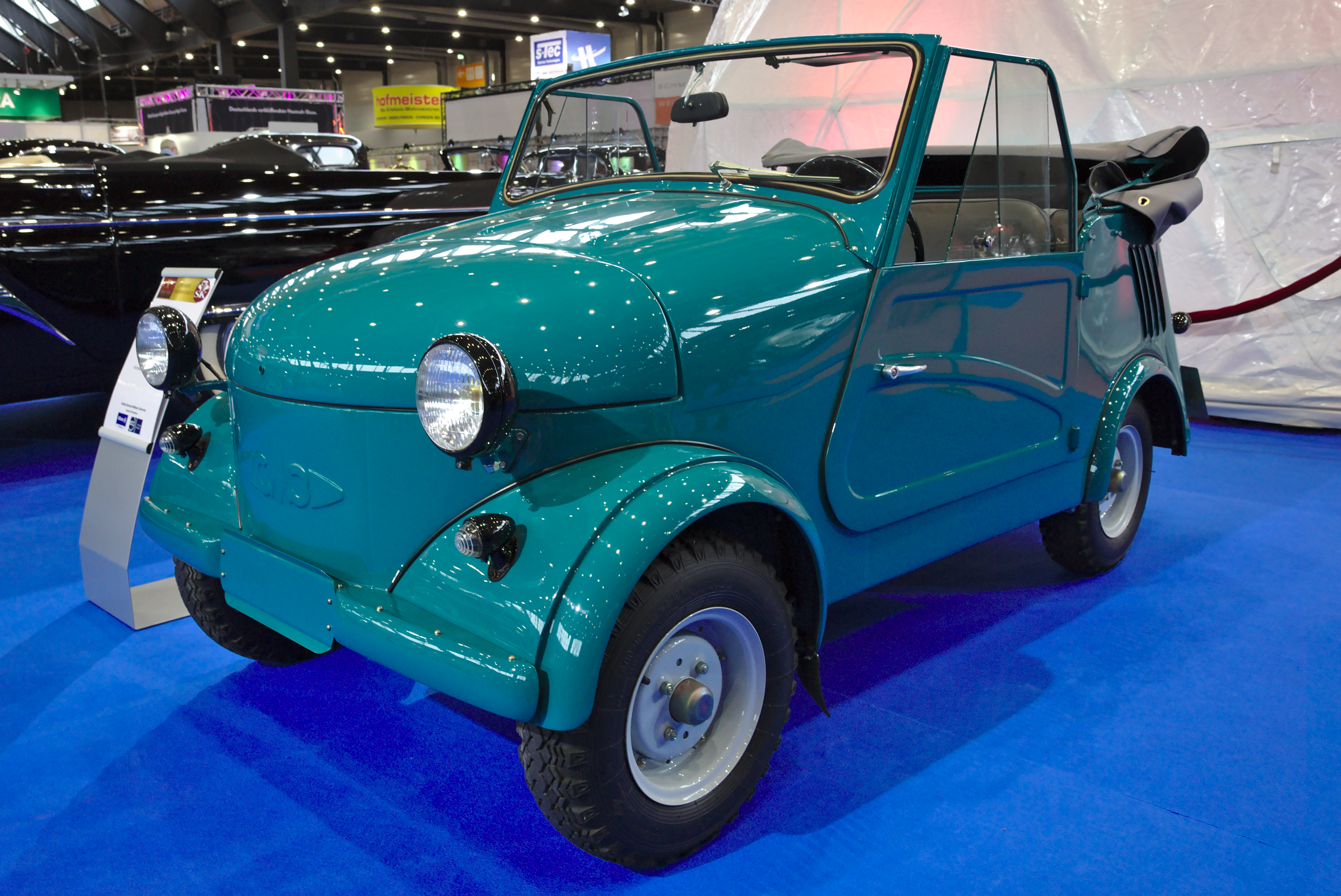
SMZ S-3A (1958–1970)

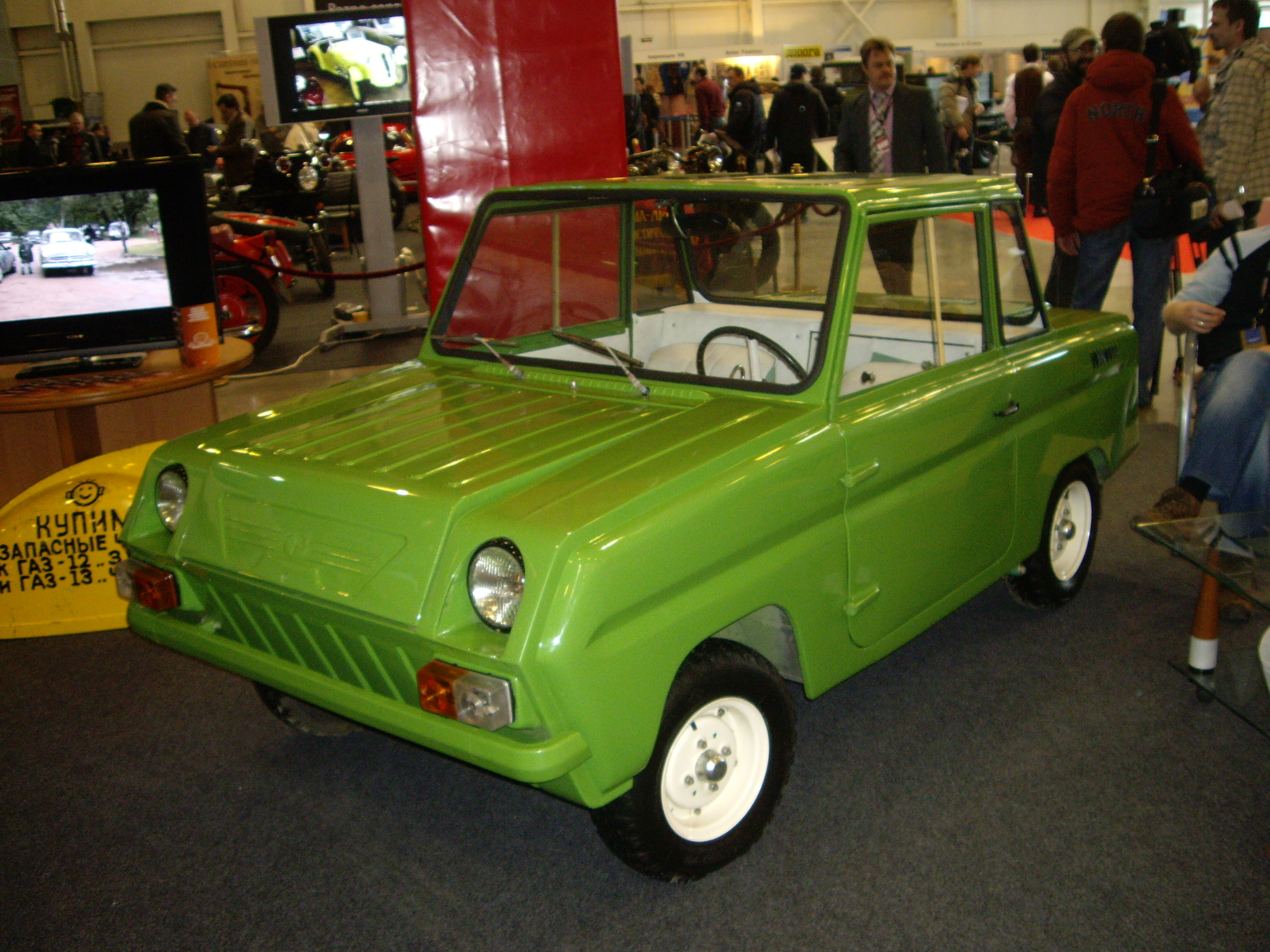
SMZ S3D (1970–1997)

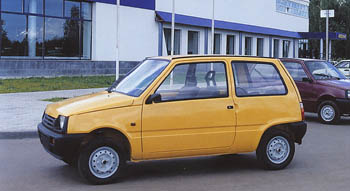
SeAZ Oka (1988–2008)
