= Economy of Ganja =

Ganja on the map

Ganja is the second largest city of Azerbaijan, according to its population (331.4 thousand (1 January 2017), however, it is behind Baku and Sumqayit in terms of industrial production. The city is located in Ganja-Gazakh economic region (12.48 thousand square kilometers). The economy of Ganja embraces the issues connected to the economy of the city of Ganja. Industry, tourism, agriculture, and transportation are the major branches of its economy. Most of the total volume of industrial products is accounted for non-ferrous metallurgy, light and food industries, electronics industry and home appliances.

== Industry ==
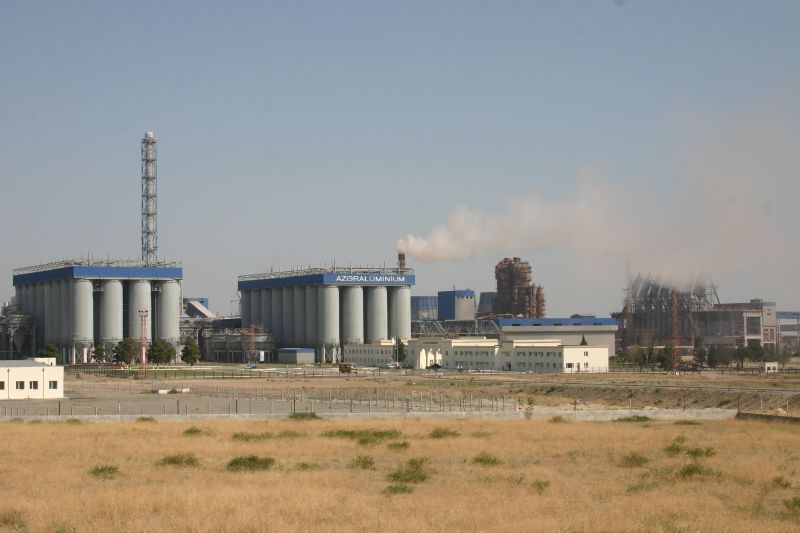
Ganja Aluminum Factory

The industry of Ganja is composed of extraction and processing industries. There are also enterprises of production of electrical devices, communications equipment, and enterprises for repairing cars and agricultural machinery operating within the machinery industrial sector which are considered as the leading branches of heavy industry. Ganja Automobile Plant meets the important part of the local demands of Agriculture within the country. Iron ore, alunite, limestone, marble, gypsum, and zeolite extracting from the districts of Ganja-Gazakh is mainly produced by enterprises that are located in Ganja. Ganja aluminum plant, for instance, is specialized in production of aluminum oxide (alumina), primary aluminum and semi-final aluminum products (such as aluminum sheet – in list and roll forms, both sides painted sheet and lists) of bauxite and alunite ore. Electroenergetics constitute another branch of heavy industry. Ganja heating and power station are two main examples of this area. Chemical industry products like sulphuric acid, potassium fertilizer are also manufactured by large plants operating within the city. Moreover, porcelain earthenware plate production exists in Ganja.

The total number of operating enterprises in industry, in 2016, was around 130. Actual prices of industrial productions are comparably higher than previous years, so that it approximately increased by 2 times to 380402 manat in 2016 compared to 2010. The share of private sector in industrial production increased to 53.4 percent that initially was around 26.4 percent in 2010. The following table shows the total contributions of industry over years.

| | 2010 | 2012 | 2013 | 2014 | 2015 | 2016 |
| Number of operating enterprises total, unit | 125 | 116 | 116 | 125 | 134 | 130 |
| Industrial product (actual price of the relevant year), thousand manat | 112315 | 191345 | 182127 | 199326 | 239954 | 380402 |
| Industrial product, relative to previous year, in percent (at comparable prices) | 134 | 238.2 | 107.3 | 111.1 | 117.7 | 131.3 |
| Remaining balance of finished goods for the year, thousand manat | 2702 | 6536 | 4723 | 6523 | 26414 | 19579 |
| Share of non-public sector in industrial product, in percent | 26,4 | 67,6 | 59,3 | 51,1 | 52,7 | 53,4 |
| Average number of employees - total, people | 7079 | 5810 | 7515 | 6154 | 4807 | 4882 |
| Average monthly salary of employees, manat | 217,7 | 272,6 | 296,2 | 328,1 | 378,4 | 395,9 |
| Availability of the main industrial and production assets (at the end of the year with the balance sheet), million. manat | 228,8 | 562,3 | 642,5 | 707,1 | 593,9 | 603,5 |
| Production of basic types of products in natural expression: | | | | | | |
| Cotton fabrics, thousand square m | 774,2 | 94,2 | 288,4 | 547,6 | 545,9 | 259 |
| Sugar confectionery products, tons | 34,6 | 51,1 | 62,7 | 23,7 | 28,9 | 12,1 |
| Sausage products, tons | 44,6 | 61,4 | 62,7 | 66,9 | 67,3 | 15,5 |
| Flour, thousand tons | 40,8 | 63,1 | 57 | 47,7 | 53,5 | 52,4 |
| Wheat bran, tons | 13124 | 5024 | 5300 | 4639 | 5373 | 7759 |
| Brandy (cognac), thousand dekaliter | 5,5 | 4,9 | 3 | 3,5 | 1,1 | 1,2 |
| Vodka, thousand dekaliter | 221,7 | 249,7 | 264,7 | 284,4 | 168,3 | 127,9 |
| Grape wine, thousand dekaliter | 308,7 | 454,3 | 476,8 | 450,7 | 288 | 291,2 |
| Aluminum oxide, thousand tons | - | 101,8 | - | - | - | - |
| Heat energy, thousand | 11,9 | 2,2 | 4,3 | 20,3 | 46,6 | 30,3 |
| Including commodity | 11,9 | 2,2 | 4 | 16,4 | 45,6 | 29,3 |
| Fruit juices, thousand | 3,3 | 3 | 30 | 2,4 | 2,4 | - |
| The finished aluminum alloys are initially tone | - | 52241,8 | - | - | - | - |

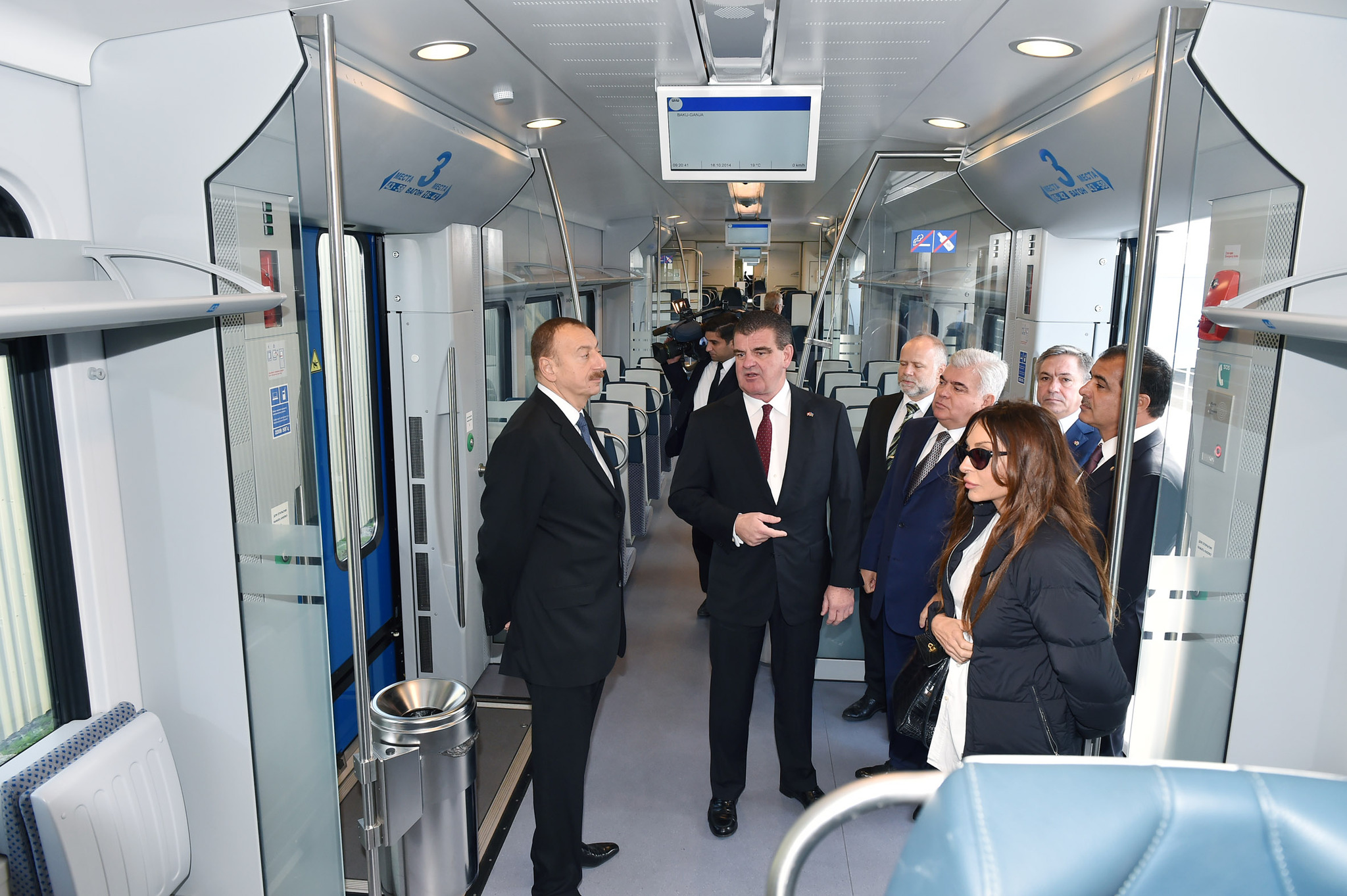
On Saturday, October 18, 2014, the President of Azerbaijan Ilham Aliyev attended the groundbreaking ceremony for the new plant.

The construction of a plant had been launched for the production of railway cars by the Swiss company Stadler Rail Group in the city of Ganja in the West of Azerbaijan.

The plant, with an initial capacity of 50–60 passenger cars a year, would provide local Economy not only for the domestic market, but also for the neighboring countries.

The head of Azerbaijan Railways Arif Askerov said that the construction is scheduled for completion in the Spring of 2016. Since then this project never have been completed.

=== Light industry ===
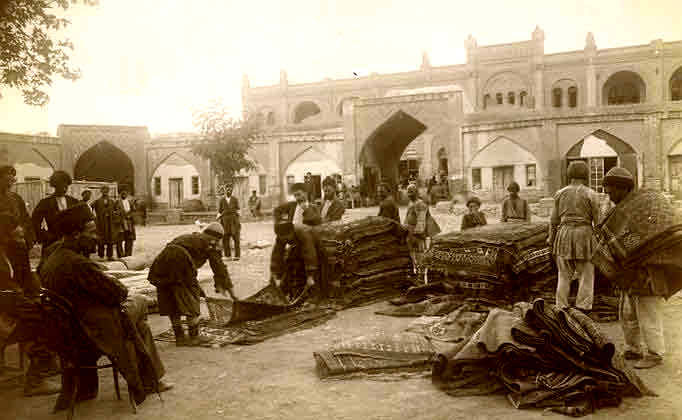
Carpet market in Ganja (XIXcentury)

The light industry of Ganja comprises cotton cloth, wool cloth, production of textile goods, carpet weaving enterprises which primarily relies on the processing of local raw material that comes from the other districts of Ganja-Gazakh economic region. Textile goods under name of Ganja silk are exported to Russia, Georgia, Turkey, and Tunisia.

=== Food industry ===
The food industry depends on processing of agricultural products such as production of wine, cognac, meat-dairy products, confectionery, and canned production. The project named “New Chinar” aimed to restore the production of the new types and production of famous “Chinar” sweets. After restoration “New Chinar” brand will be one of the biggest sweets manufacturer of the Caucasus region.

=== Construction industry ===
The main enterprises operating in construction industry are large panel household building construction company, metal-concrete, brick ceramics and marble plants. Limestone, marble, and gypsum are the main natural resources utilized in construction industry. The total amount of investments in construction works, in 2016, is around 254094.3 thousand manat that is relatively high compared to previous years.

Statistics of construction works in Ganja
| | 2010 | 2012 | 2013 | 2014 | 2015 | 2016 |
| Putted into operation: | | | | | | |
| Main funds (thousand manat) | 38680,4 | 269035,3 | 251206,4 | 353247,7 | 332419,4 | 95401,9 |
| Houses, total area (thousand square meters) | 14,1 | 24,4 | 116,4 | 45,9 | 36,7 | 58,9 |
| of which private houses | 11,5 | 15,2 | 29,7 | 14,5 | 36,7 | 36,9 |
| Investments in main capital (thousand manat) | 99518,8 | 176496,5 | 334069,1 | 387245,1 | 355472,6 | 278893,3 |
| including: | | | | | | |
| construction works | 64470,0 | 168726,7 | 311903,8 | 348036,4 | 315717,0 | 254094,3 |
| Number of construction companies | 28 | 22 | 23 | 27 | 23 | 20 |
| The number of employees working there | 887 | 956 | 997 | 407 | 387 | 280 |

== Agriculture ==
The major agricultural specialization areas in Ganja are potatoes, viniculture, and wheat production. 13-14% of agricultural output in the republic, including 80-85% of potatoes, 28% of grapes, 15% of livestock goods belongs to Ganja-Gazakh region's share along with the city of Ganja. The weight water-melon, vegetable-growing, fruit-growing and cattle breeding in agriculture increases annually.7. The following table indicates the total changes in the agriculture of Ganja from 2010 to 2016 and also provides detailed information in all areas of agriculture.

| | 2010 | 2012 | 2013 | 2014 | 2015 | 2016 |
Total area of sown agricultural crops (ha)
| Cereals and cereal legumes | 12 | 12 | 15 | 28 | 22 | 13 |
| Including wheat | 4 | 7 | 15 | 23 | 22 | 10 |
| Sunflower for seed production | - | 1 | - | - | - | - |
| Potato | 22 | 21 | 21 | 22 | 20 | 13 |
| Vegetables | 49 | 48 | 48 | 48 | 47 | 28 |
| Fruit and berry | 108 | 117 | 117 | 117 | 117 | 310 |
| Grape | 286 | 288 | 68 | 68 | 86 | 94 |
| Cereals and cereal legumes | 9 | 21 | 33 | 64 | 49 | 14 |
| Including wheat | 5 | 15 | 33 | 55 | 50 | 13 |
| Sunflower for seed production | - | 1 | - | - | - | - |
| Potato | 132 | 148 | 159 | 161 | 240 | 162 |
| Vegetables | 823 | 1190 | 1194 | 756 | 916 | 231 |
| Fruit and berry | 369 | 560 | 572 | 580 | 602 | 917 |
| Grape | 1462 | 2239 | 583 | 460 | 279 | 817 |
Productivity (in all categories of farming), centner / ha
| Grain | 8,2 | 17,3 | 21,9 | 22,9 | 22,1 | 13,0 |
| Including wheat | 13,2 | 21,0 | 21,9 | 23,9 | 22,1 | 12,5 |
| Sunflower for seed production | - | 8,4 | - | - | - | - |
| Potato | 59 | 72 | 76 | 73 | 120 | 127 |
| Vegetables | 55 | 71 | 73 | 79 | 82 | 83 |
| Fruit and berry | 37,9 | 55,0 | 56,2 | 57,0 | 53,7 | 32,8 |
| Grape | 47,8 | 79,5 | 78,5 | 58,7 | 31,4 | 98,9 |
Number of Livestock (in total
| cattle | 1364 | 1249 | 1646 | 1579 | 1133 | 1300 |
| including cow and buffalo | 577 | 535 | 586 | 594 | 398 | 426 |
| Sheep and goats | 5590 | 2753 | 2825 | 2650 | 2017 | 2670 |
| Pigs | 76 | - | - | - | - | - |
| Birds | 11181 | 9260 | 12000 | 12335 | 22885 | 21500 |
| Bee families | 14 | 19 | 19 | 16 | 4 | 8 |
Production of cattle product, ton
| Meat | 28 | 33 | 34 | 29 | 26 | 20 |
| Milk | 385 | 446 | 520 | 569 | 588 | 394 |
| Eggs | 287 | 232 | 254 | 276 | 288 | 384 |
| Wool (in physical weight) | 5 | 3 | 3 | 3 | 4 | 3 |

== Tourism ==
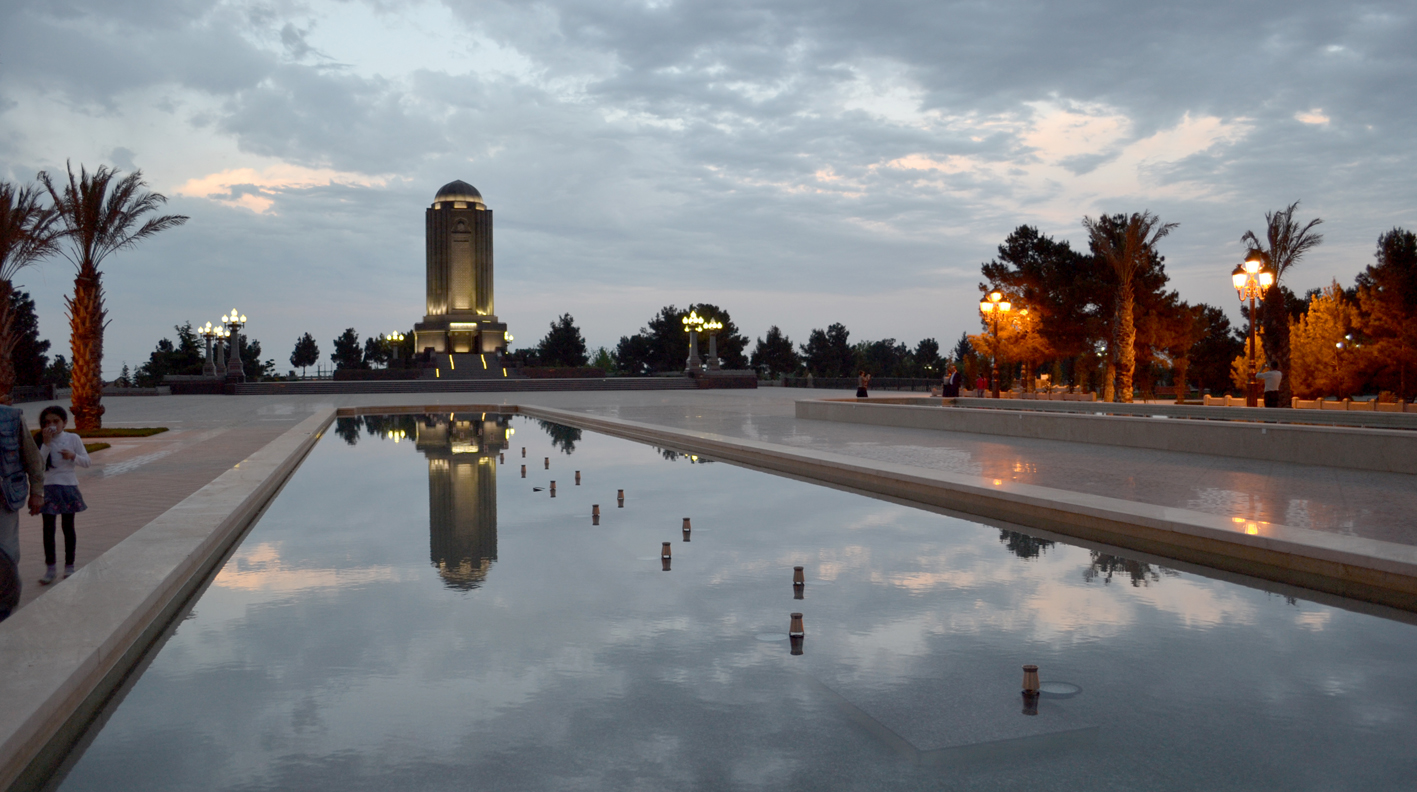
Nizami Ganjavi Mausoleum

The convenient natural conditions, clean climate, landscape, and historical monuments and buildings from its past makes Ganja one the main touristic places within Azerbaijan. In fact, Shahsevenler and Shah Abbas Mosques, Comerd Gessab Tomb, Alban temple and Divankhana are the main architectural structures form those times. The Heydar Aliyev Center and Park Complex in Ganja, the Nizami Ganjavi Museum and Center, the Cultural Center named after Mahsati Ganjavi and Ganja Castle Gates are also on the list of touristic places. The number of hotels and inns in the city was 8 with the total capacity of 1267 according to statistics of 2016. The table below gives data about tourism in Ganja nearly around a decade.

| | 2010 | 2012 | 2013 | 2014 | 2015 | 2016 |
| Number of hotel and hotel type facilities, unit | 7 | 9 | 9 | 8 | 9 | 8 |
| Number of rooms, unit | 511 | 650 | 650 | 469 | 636 | 636 |
| Total capacity, places | 956 | 1247 | 1247 | 927 | 1267 | 1267 |
| Number of persons, persons | 8036 | 15885 | 11968 | 8718 | 17114 | 11245 |
| Number of accommodations, individual-night | 8594 | 15885 | 12428 | 9335 | 22200 | 21556 |

== Transportation ==
The City is located on the railroad and high road lines connecting Azerbaijan to Georgia and the Black Sea. Ganja-Gazakh-Georgia border highway and Baku-Tbilisi-Kars railway that connecting Trans-Europe and Trans-Asia railway networks through Azerbaijan, Georgia and Turkey passes through Ganja. Ganja, like the other big cities in Azerbaijan has a large urban transport system. Out of 38819 vehicles for public transportation, 1279 were buses. In 2013, representatives of Alstom, a French transport company, have visited headquarters of Executive Authorities in Ganja, Azerbaijan`s second largest city, to discuss construction of a tram line. However, this project never implemented. The city does not have subway line neither.

Statistics for Transportation in Ganja

| | 2010 | 2012 | 2013 | 2014 | 2015 | 2016 |
| Cargo transportation, thousand tons | 3241 | 3879 | 4150 | 4283 | 4510 | 4686 |
| Freight turnover, mlyn. tons | 389,9 | 457,5 | 490,4 | 509,3 | 535,8 | 557,2 |
| Passenger transportation, thousand people | 63205 | 73041 | 78300 | 82615 | 88233 | 91939 |
| Passenger turnover, mlin. Passenger km | 694,3 | 808,3 | 873,0 | 918,1 | 981,4 | 1023,6 |
| Total number of cars, units | 34530 | 40920 | 43872 | 41672 | 43498 | 44888 |
| including: | | | | | | |
| Trucks | 2849 | 4321 | 4562 | 4296 | 4383 | 4383 |
| Buses | 1024 | 1219 | 1224 | 1205 | 1252 | 1279 |
| Number of vehicles for public transportation | 30152 | 35089 | 37760 | 35770 | 37469 | 38819 |
| Personal cars | 29851 | 34740 | 37400 | 35420 | 37102 | 38452 |
| Vehicles for special purposes | 252 | 242 | 254 | 254 | 238 | 252 |
| Other vehicles | 253 | 49 | 72 | 147 | 156 | 155 |

=== Air ===
The Ganja International Airport located in Ganja city of Azerbaijan was built in 2006, has received the status of an international airport. It is the only airport in the north-west part of Azerbaijan.

== See also ==
- Economy of Azerbaijan
- Ganja Auto Plant
