= Ganja Auto Plant =

Azerbaijani automobile assembly plant

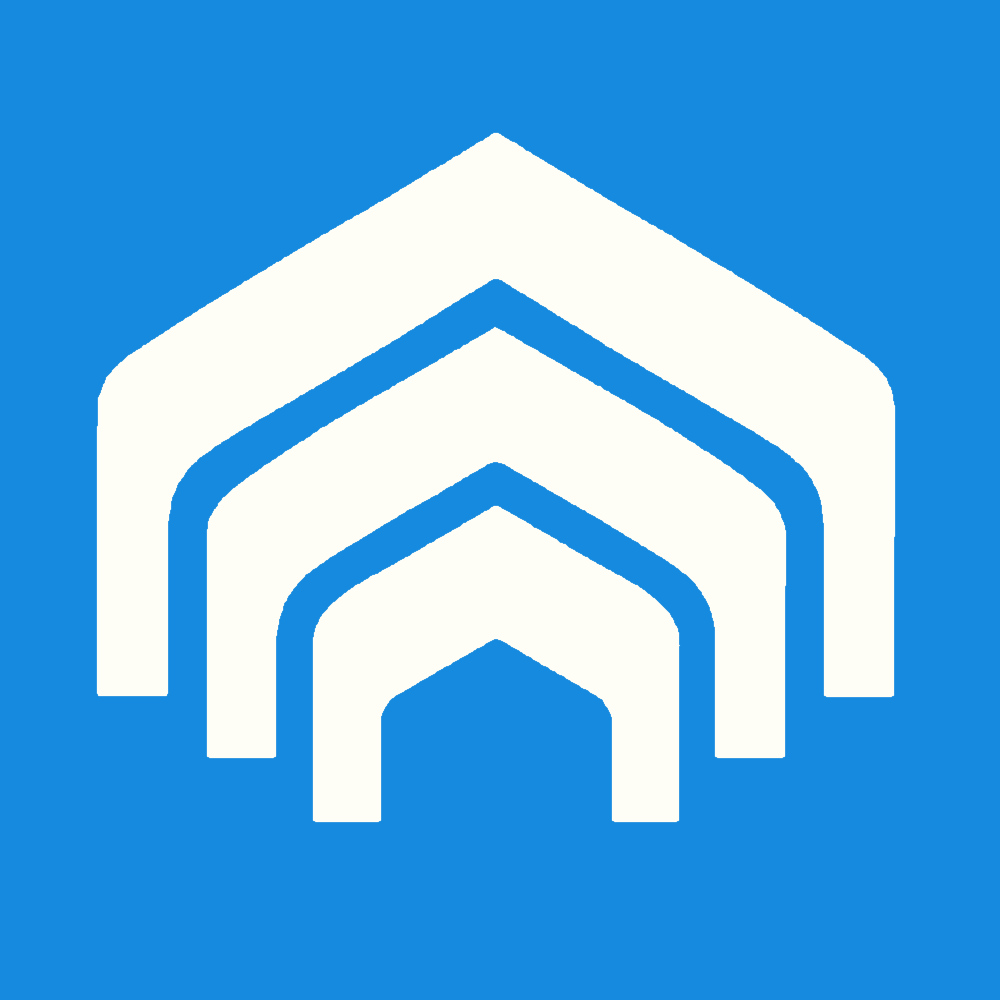
- Company type: Public Company
- Industry: Automotive
- Predecessor: KiAZ (Kirovabad Automobile Factory)
- Founded: 1986
- Headquarters: Ganja, Azerbaijan
- Area served: Azerbaijan, Georgia, Turkey
- Products: Automobiles, Trucks, Mobile Cranes, Utility Trucks, Buses, Tractors, Combine harvesters, Agricultural machinery
- Total assets: USD 40,000,000 dollar
- Number of employees: 500
- Subsidiaries: ATUB Turkey
- Website: http://ganjaauto.az/

Ganja Auto Plant (Azerbaijani: Gəncə Avtomobil Zavodu) is an auto assembly plant based in Ganja, Azerbaijan. The factory was founded in 1986 as KiAZ (Kirovabad Automobile Plant) for a production of run of 30,000 "GAZelle" vans according to the project brief. The commissioning was intended to end in 1989, but following a decision of Council of Ministers of the former USSR, the construction of the factory was interrupted, and the technological project was given to the Bryansk Automobile Plant. The 256 hectares (633 acres) of overall territory, including the 50 hectares (120 acres) of the factory footprint itself, stayed without utilization for 15 years.

Construction of an automobile plant was considered by the government after the 1991 collapse of the Soviet Union when Azerbaijan had obtained its independence. Since 1994, the giant and famous automobile companies of Italy, Korea, Japan, France and Germany showed interest in the facility, but negotiations held with them ended without a deal.

In December 2004, the Ganja automobile plant started manufacturing cars, and the first car built at the factory was sold. In 2008, the plant produced about 600 cars and tractors.

The plant has started to assemble 100 percent locally produced containers for utility vehicles at the plant since June 2025.

== History ==
Construction of the plant began in 1986 under the name KiAZ (Kirovabad Automobile Factory). The production capacity of the plant was designed to produce 30,000 cars. Construction of the plant for the project was supposed to end in 1989, but because of the collapse of the Soviet Union in 1991, the construction and operation of the plant was postponed indefinitely. After Azerbaijan gained the independence, in 1993, Turkish company Otokar, showed the interest in factory but due to political change production never implemented. In December 2004, it opened as the Gyandzha Auto Plant and the first car that came out of their production line was presented that year. In the year 2008 the factory produced about 600 vehicles, both cars and tractors, also later bus assembly was started.

This plant serves as one example of the Azeri government's efforts to show progress in diversifying its economy, which has traditionally always been largely dependent on the production oil and gas, and has been able to serve other purposes, in particular, to give a factual basis for political propaganda of the government. It also downplays some of the state's main weaknesses, such as having been formerly totally dependent on the import of transport equipment from other nations.

Despite the efforts made at this plant to increase production by Russian interests, the overall production is still very low, being measured in just hundreds of units annuals, where the facility's original concept would accommodate increased production, thousands of units annually.

Recently, Moldovan and Russian investors have visited the plant in order to see the progress made and the production of their products in this factory, as well as Belarusian investors.

The opening of the Azerbaijan-Belarus tractor producing plant took place on April 15, 2019, in Turkey, a source in the Ganja Automobile Plant Production Association told AzVision.az.

== Products ==
RUS Lada
- VAZ-1111 Oka (2004-2008)
- Lada Granta (2024-present)

RUS UAZ
- UAZ-31512 (2006, 2007-present)
- UAZ-31514 (2006, 2007-present)
- UAZ-31519 (2006, 2007-present)
- UAZ 39094 (2006, 2007–present)
- UAZ 396259 (2006, 2007–present)
- UAZ Hunter (2006, 2007–present)
- UAZ Simbir (2006)

RUS Kamaz trucks
- KamAZ-53501 (2015-present)
- KamAZ-6665 (2015-present)

BLR MAZ trucks
- MAZ-551605-272 (2007–present)
- MAZ-555102-223 (2007–present)
- MAZ-631705-212 (2007–present)
- MAZ-642205-222 (2007–present)
- MAZ-642208-232 (2007–present)
- MAZ-953000-010 (2007–present, semi-trailer)
- MAZ-based crane truck (2007–present)
- MAZ-based special truck (2007–present)

BLR MAZ buses
- MAZ-203 (2019-present)
- MAZ-206 (2019-present)

BLR MTZ Belarus tractors
- Belarus 80.1 (2007–present)
- Belarus 80.3 (2007–present)
- Belarus 82.1 (2007–present)
- Belarus 892 (2007–present)
- Belarus 1025 (2007–present)
- Belarus 1221 (2007–present)

ITA SDF Group tractors
- Deutz-Fahr (2023–present)

FIN Cma Sampo Combine
- Sampo 2045 (2019–present)

CHN Chang'an Automobile Group Vans & trucks
- Changan Van Ganca (2005)
- Changan Pick Up Truck (2005)

== Gallery ==
Cars and trucks

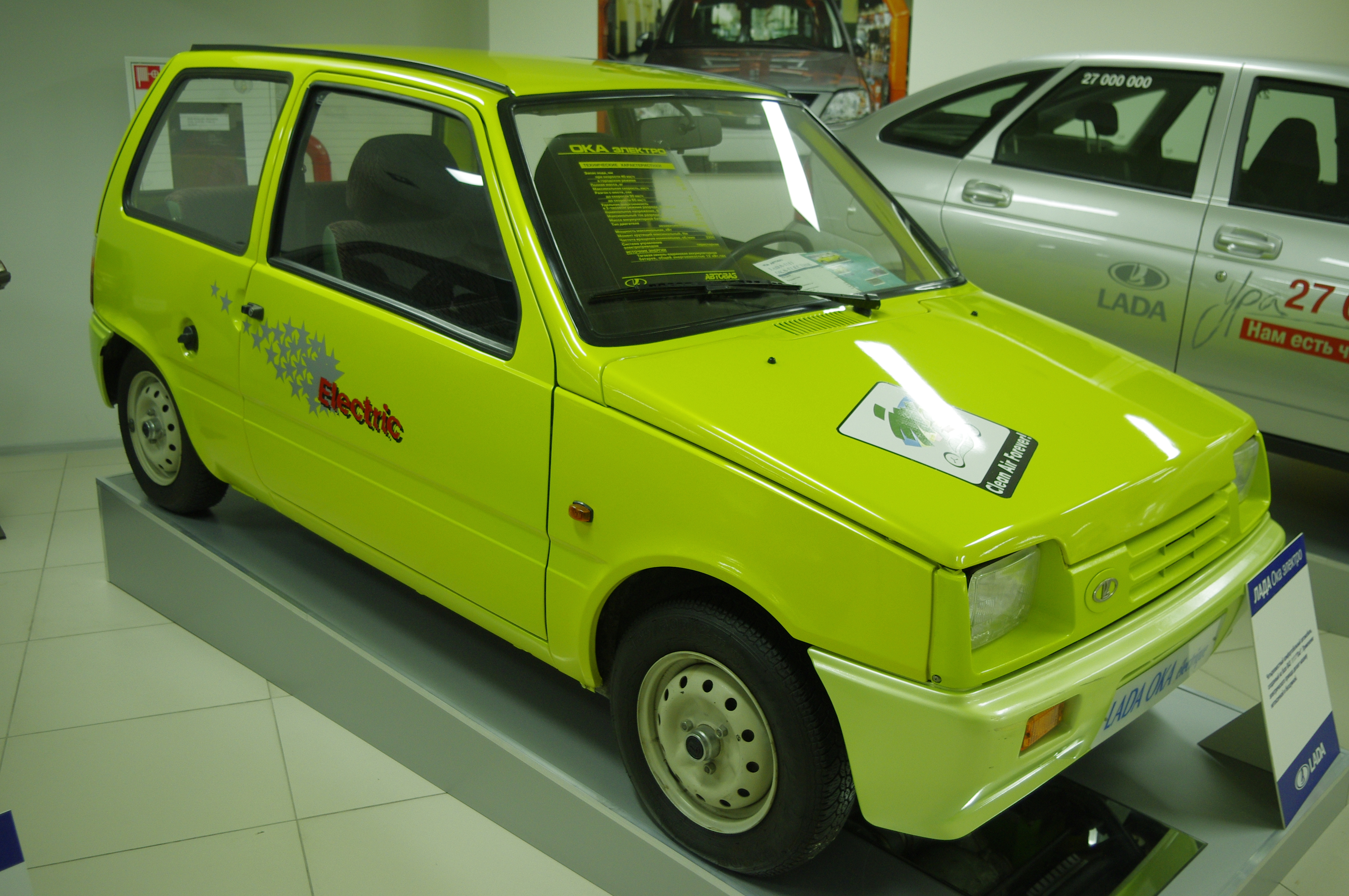
VAZ-1111 Oka

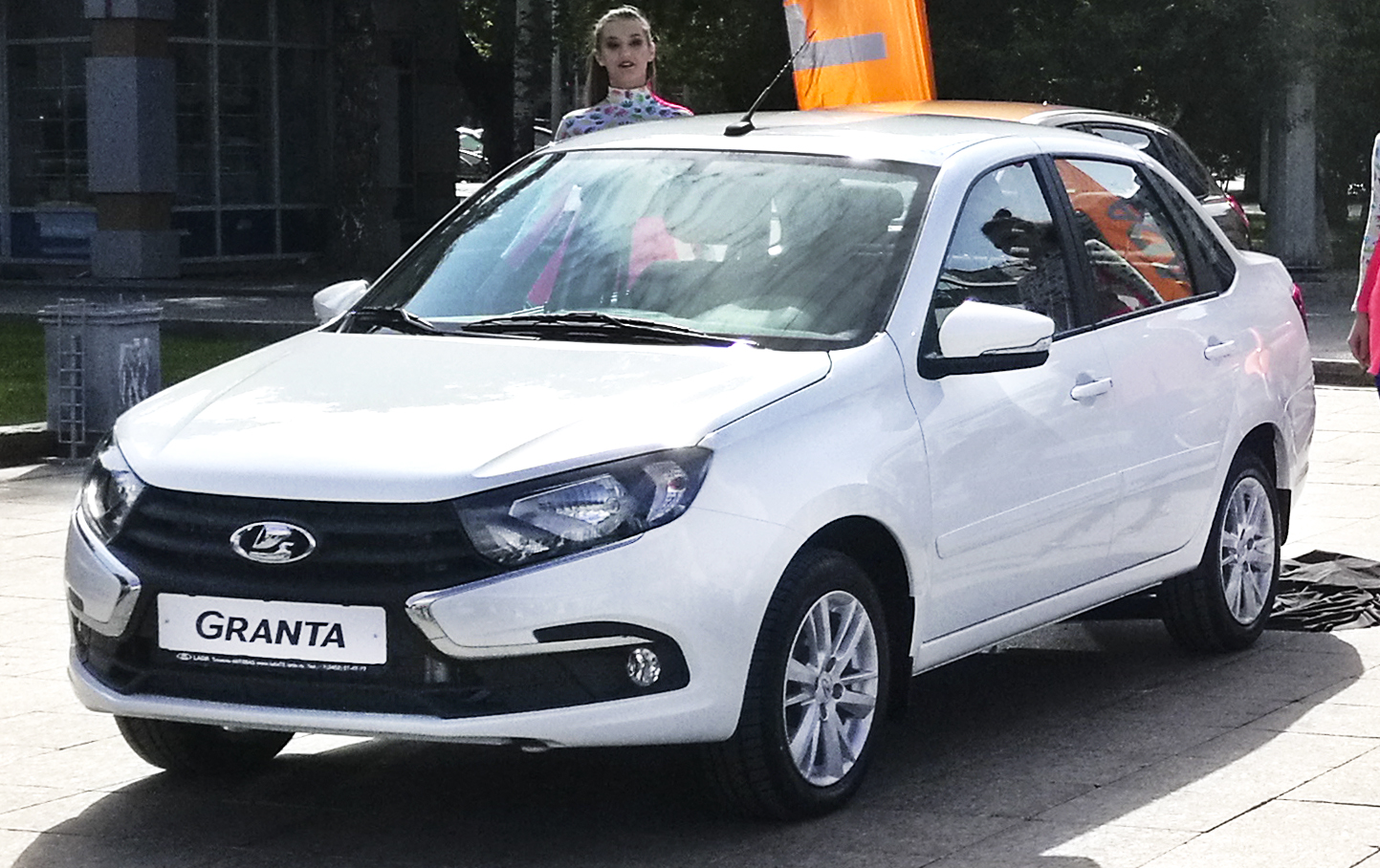
Lada Granta

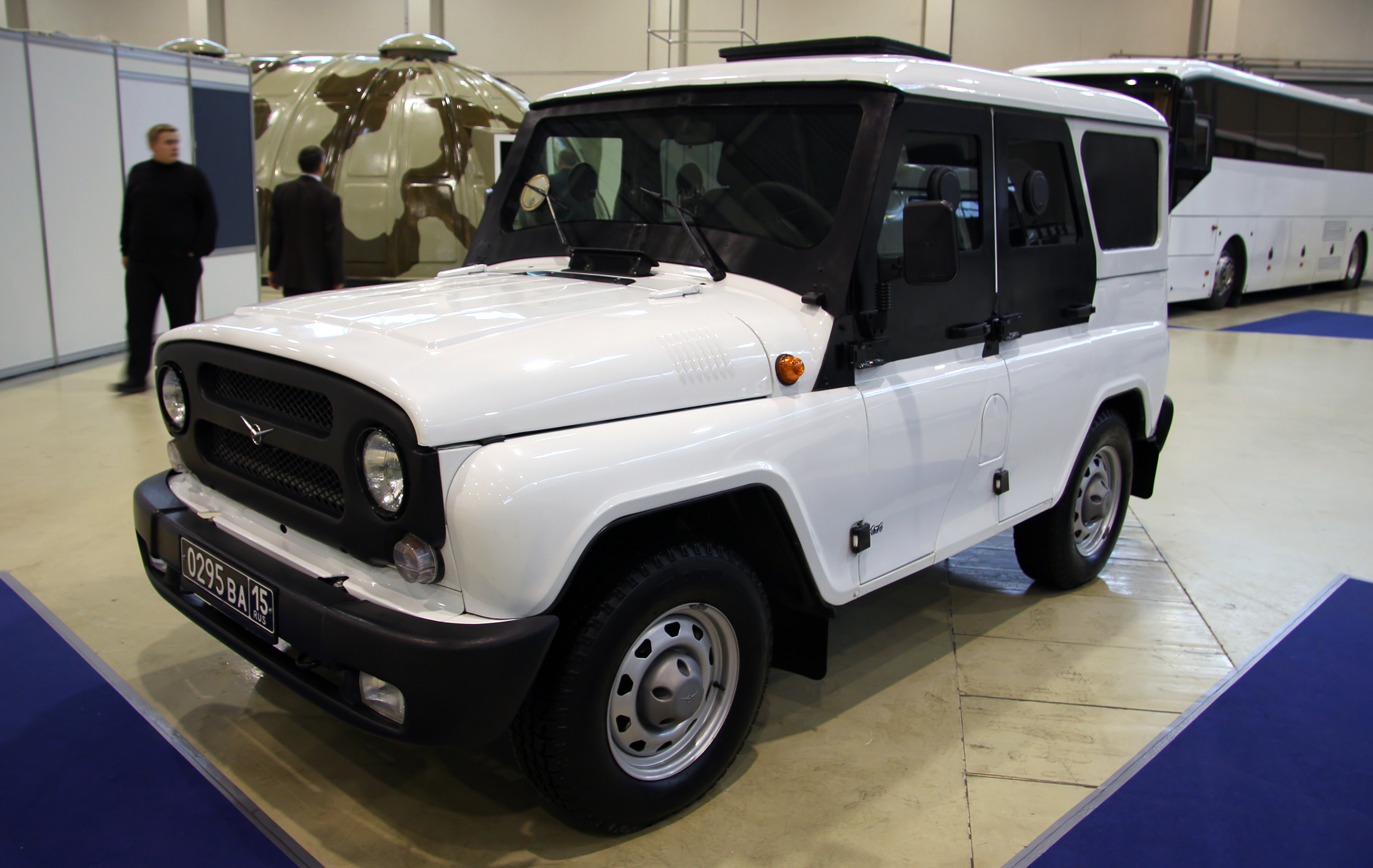
UAZ-315195 Hunter

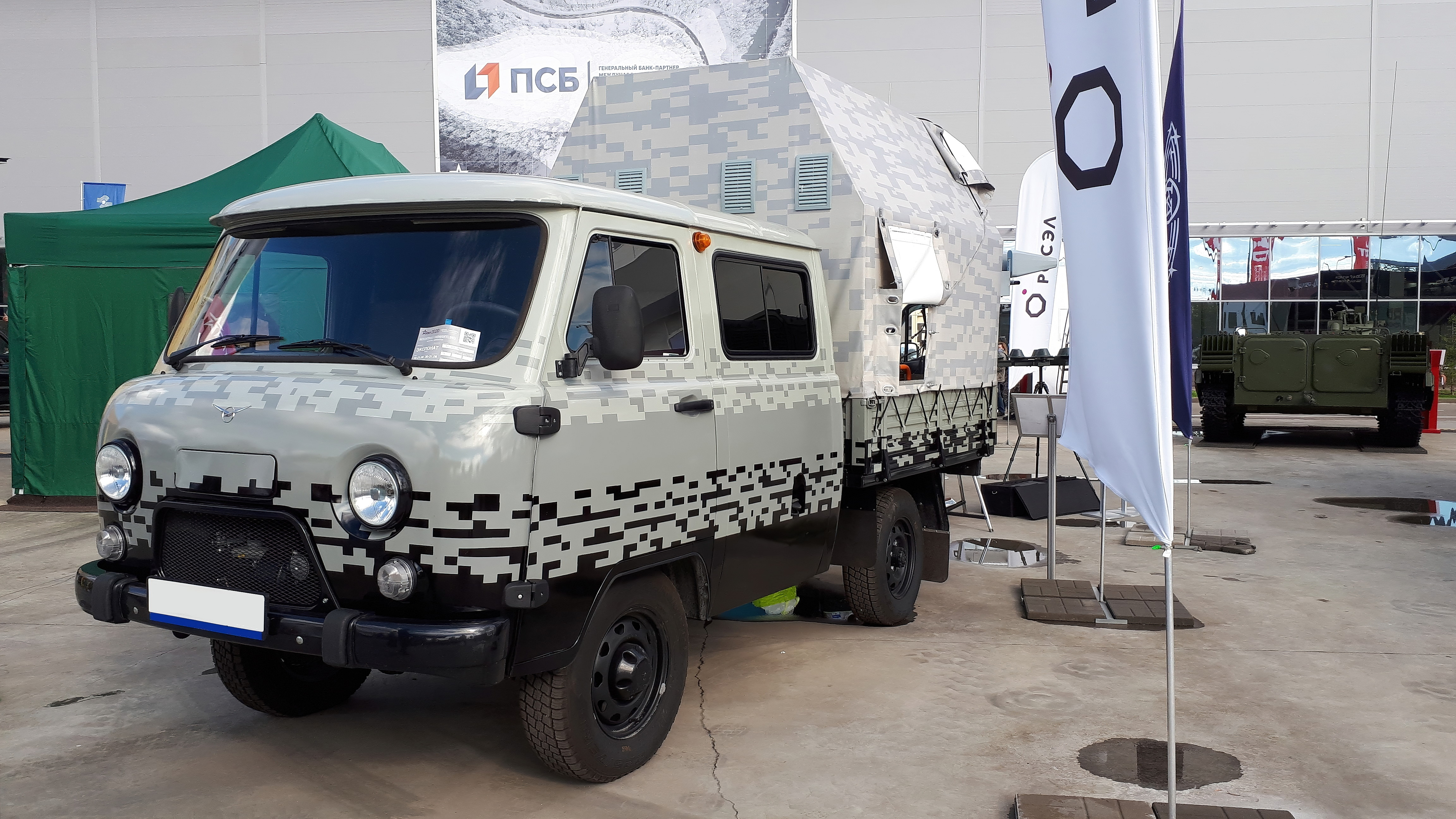
UAZ-39094

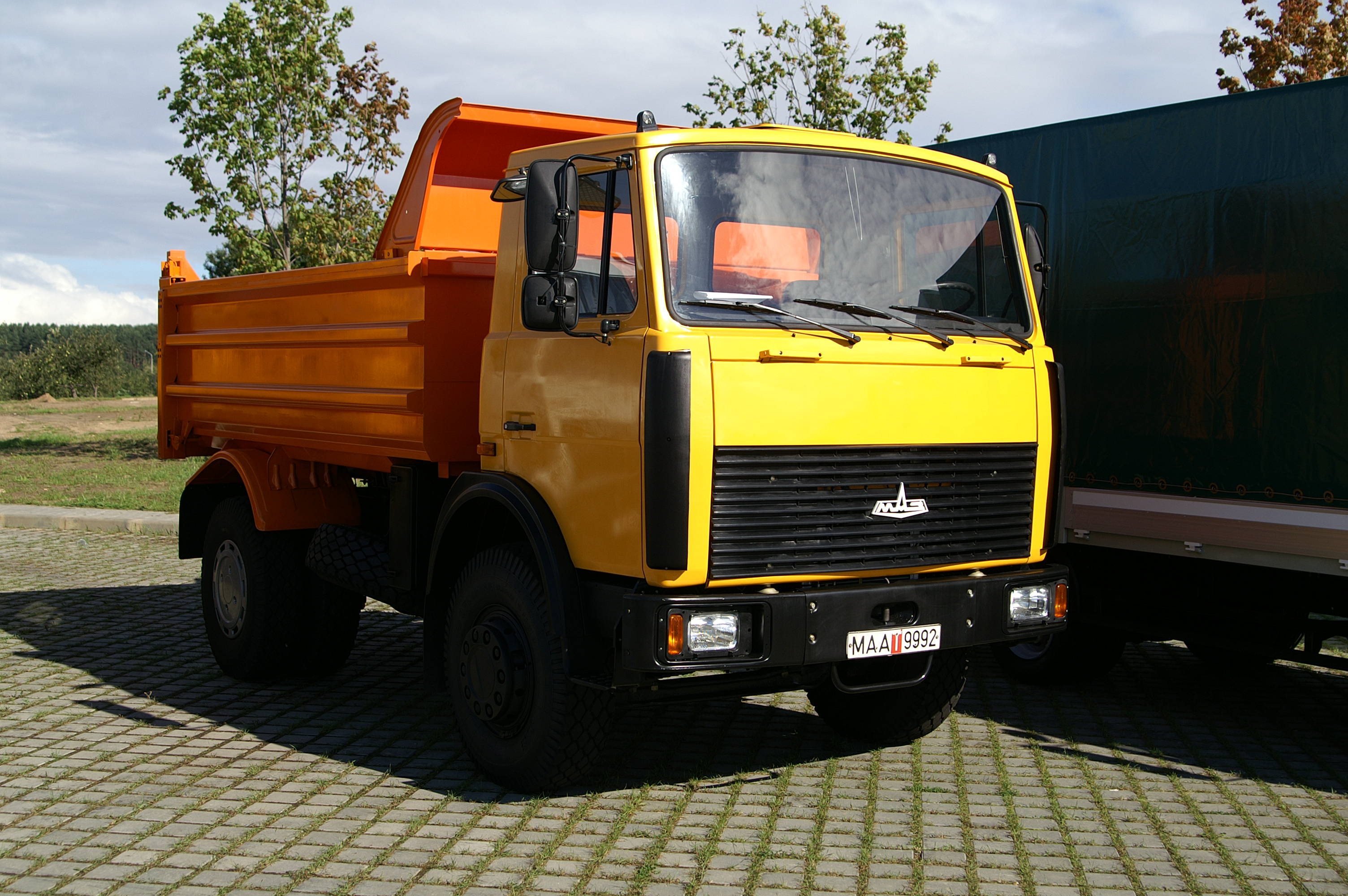
MAZ-551605

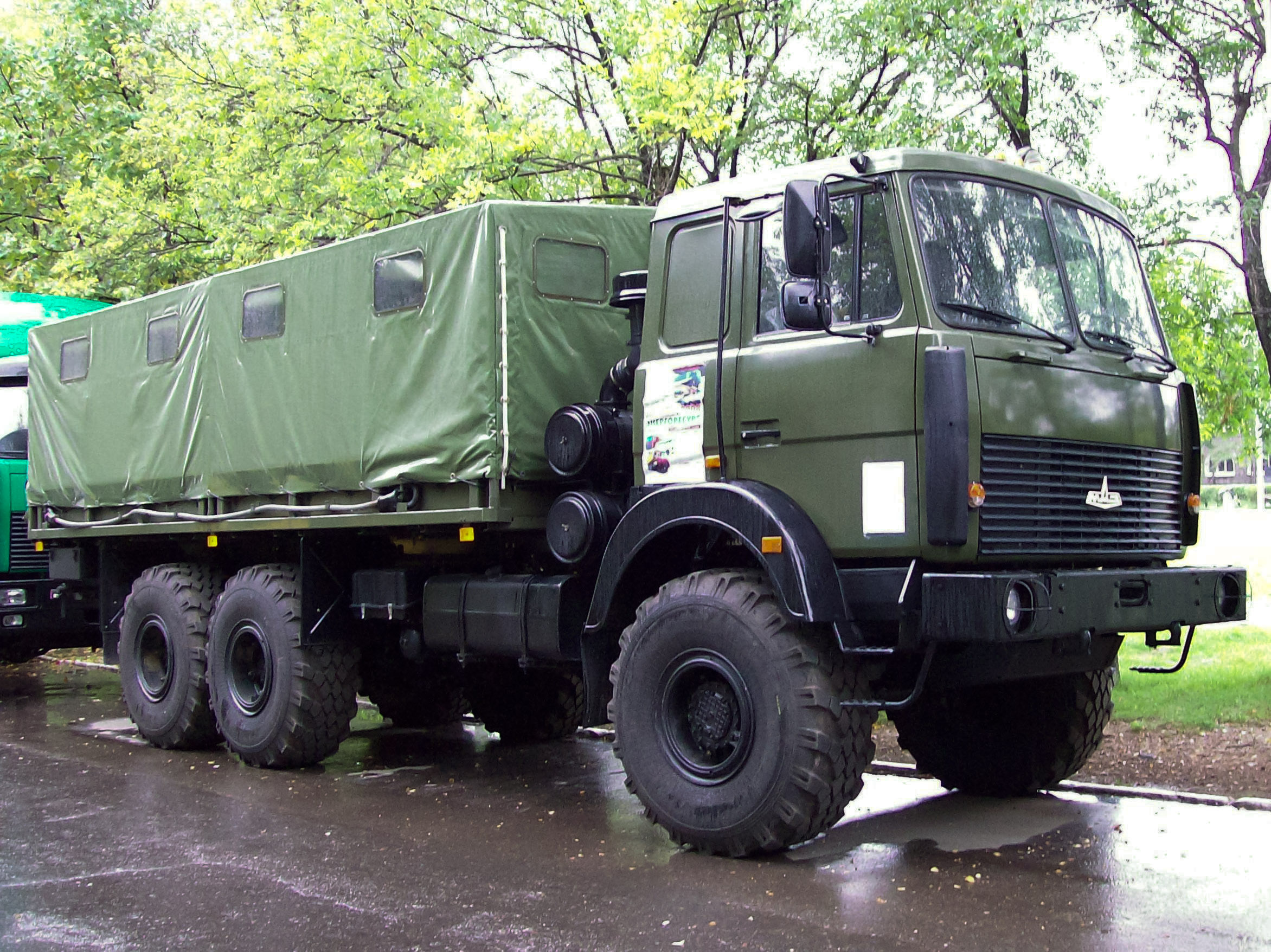
MAZ-631705

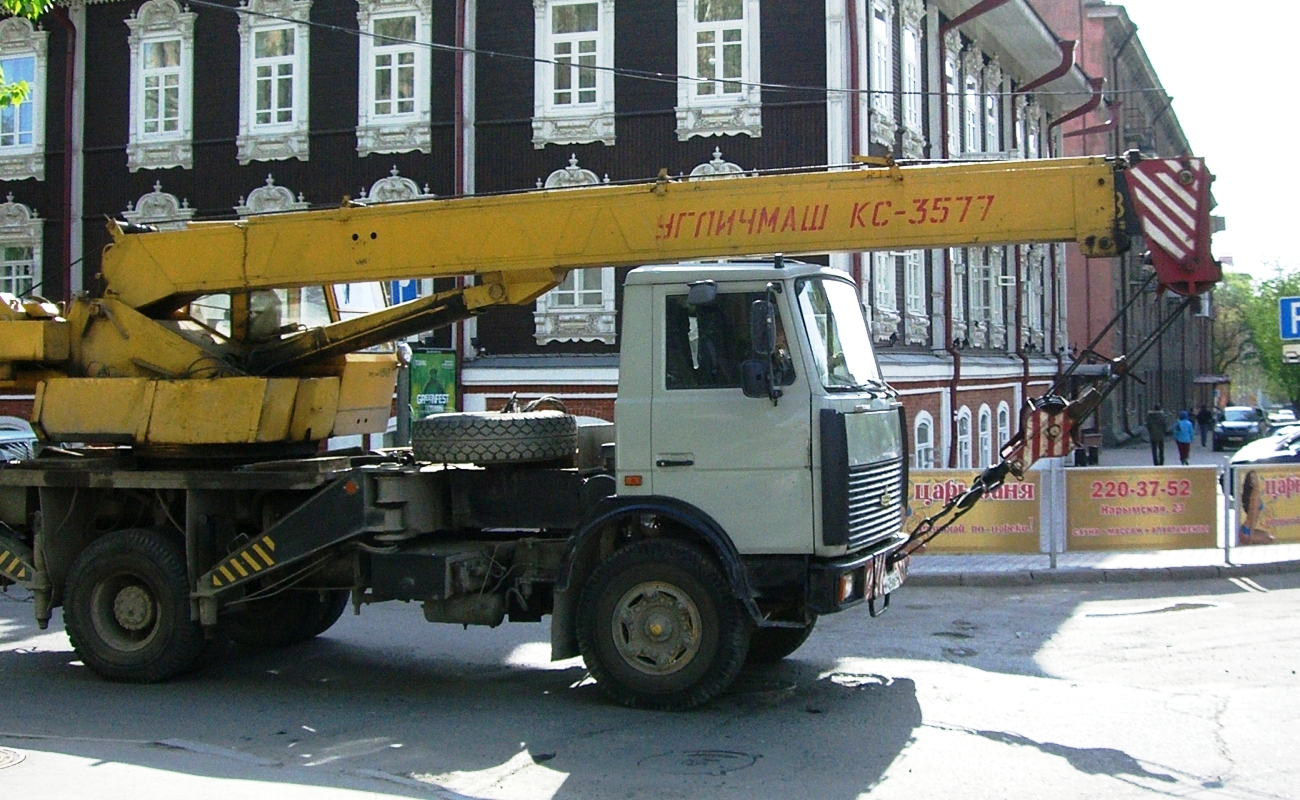
MAZ-based crane truck

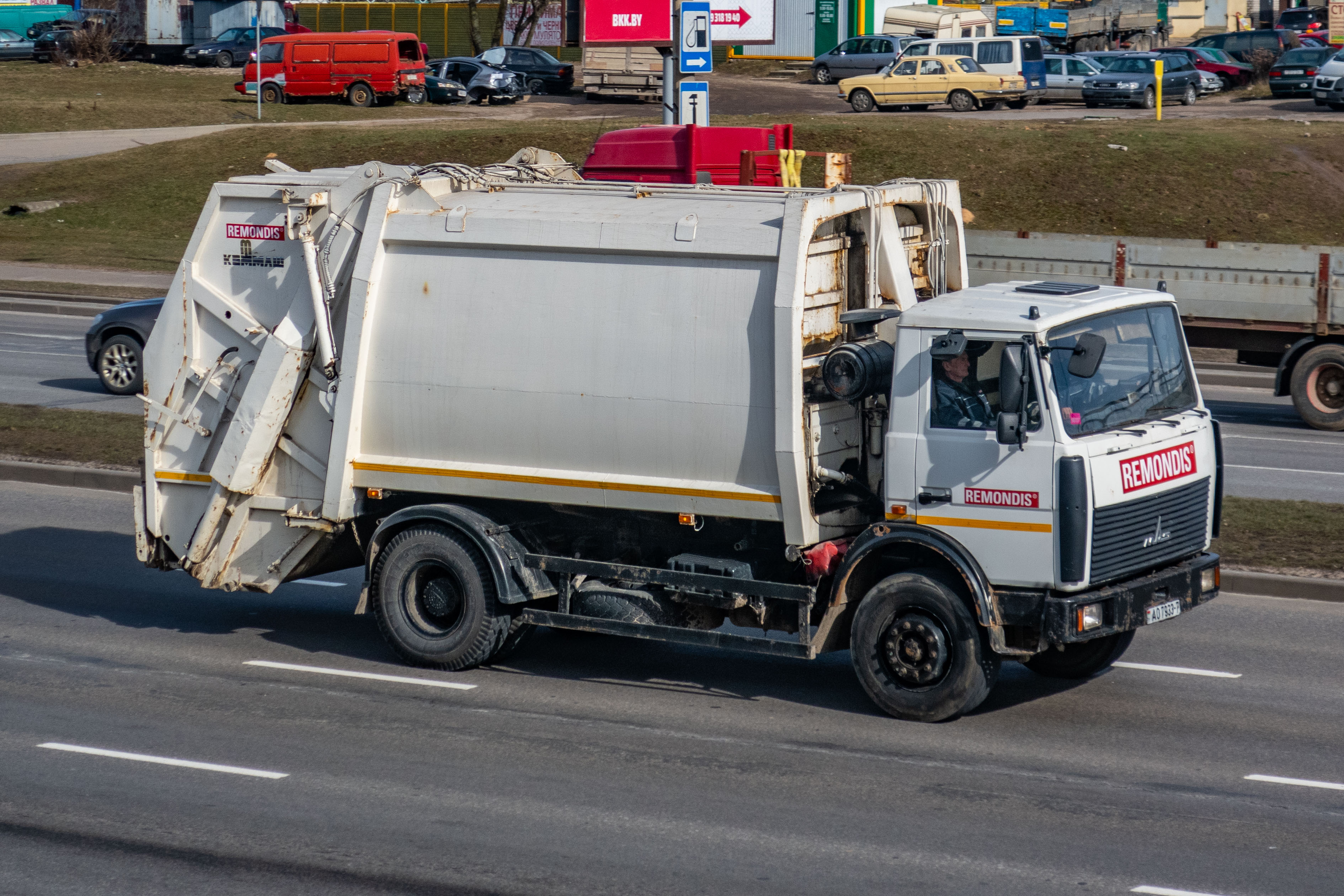
MAZ special truck

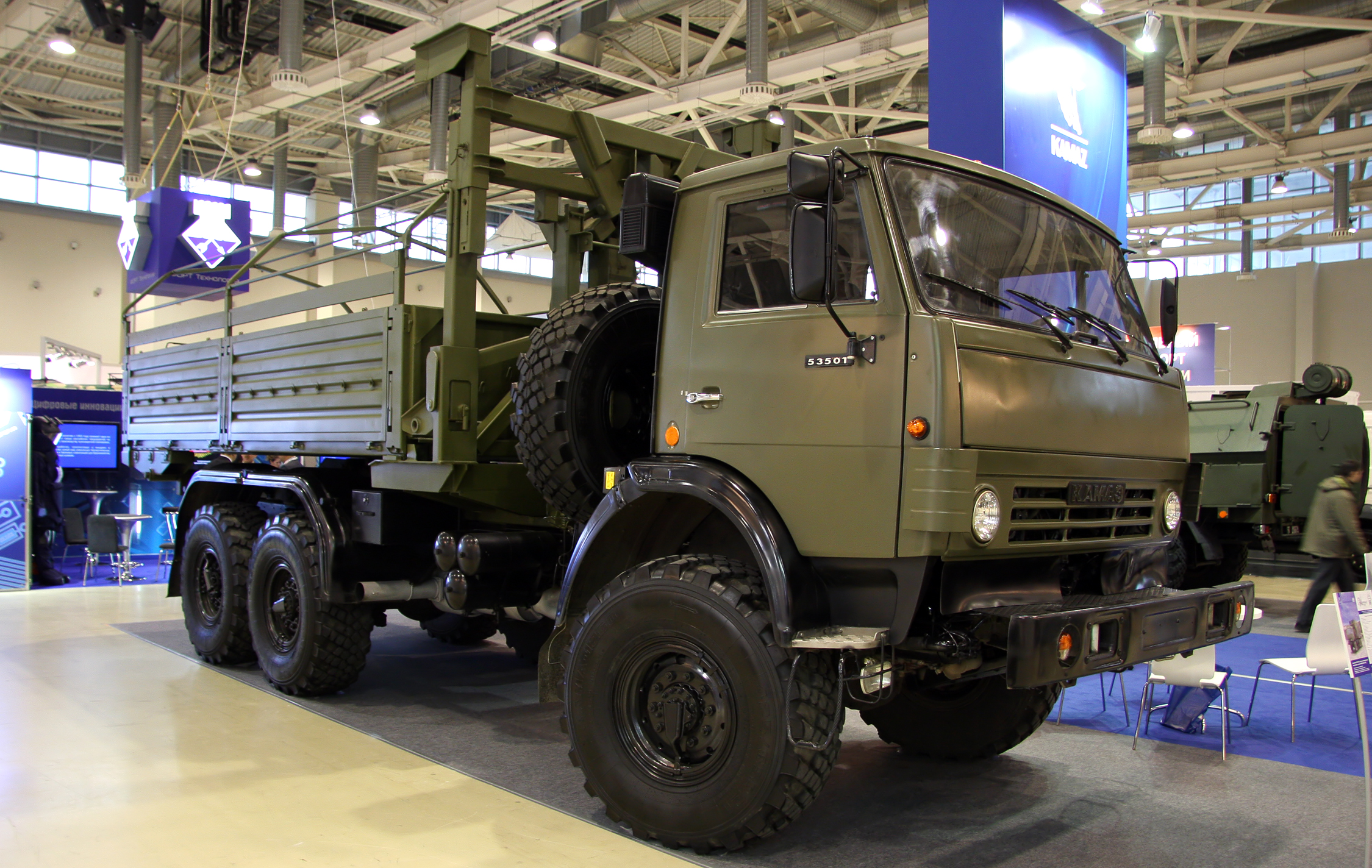
KamAZ-53501

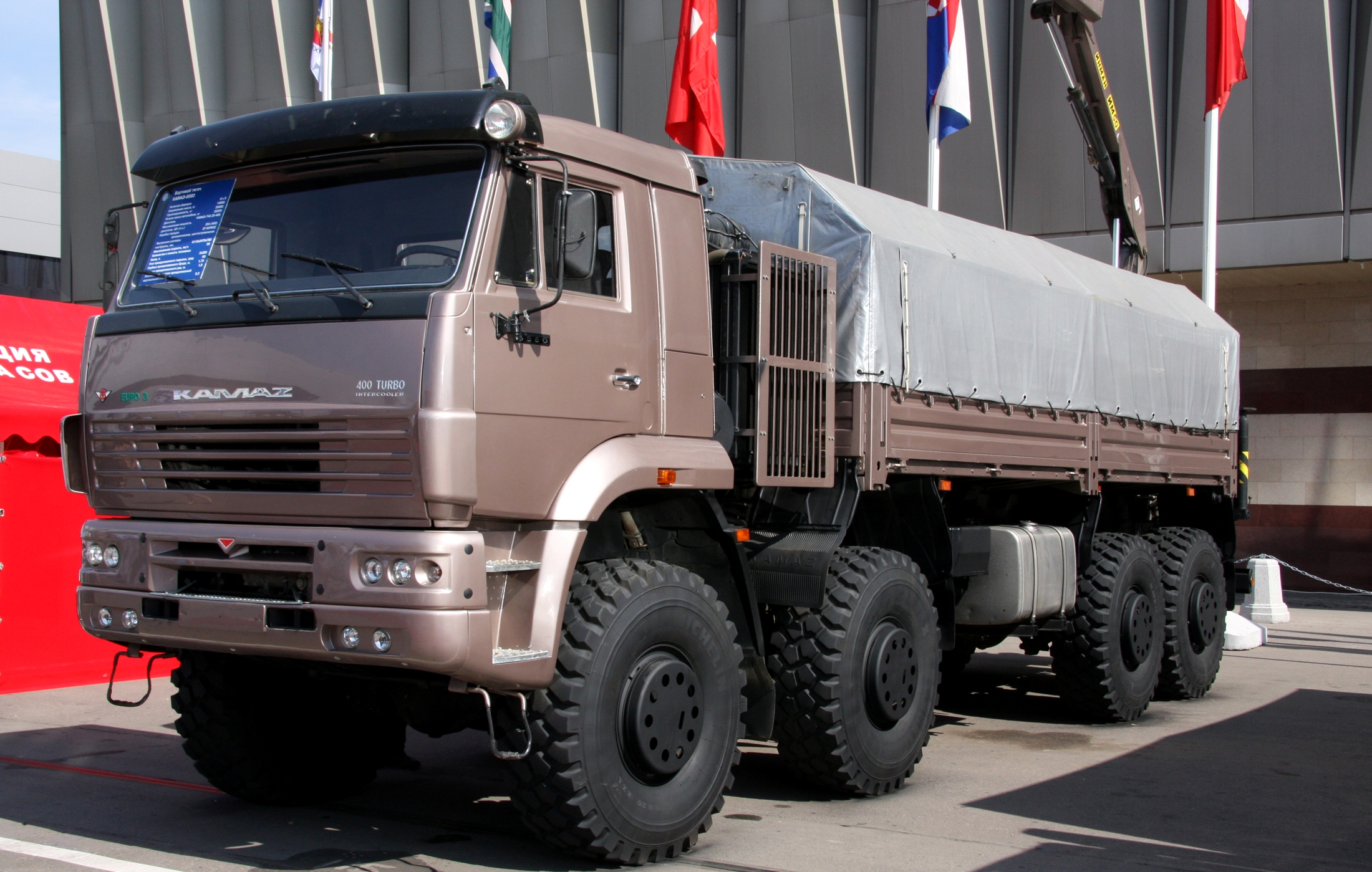
KamAZ-6560

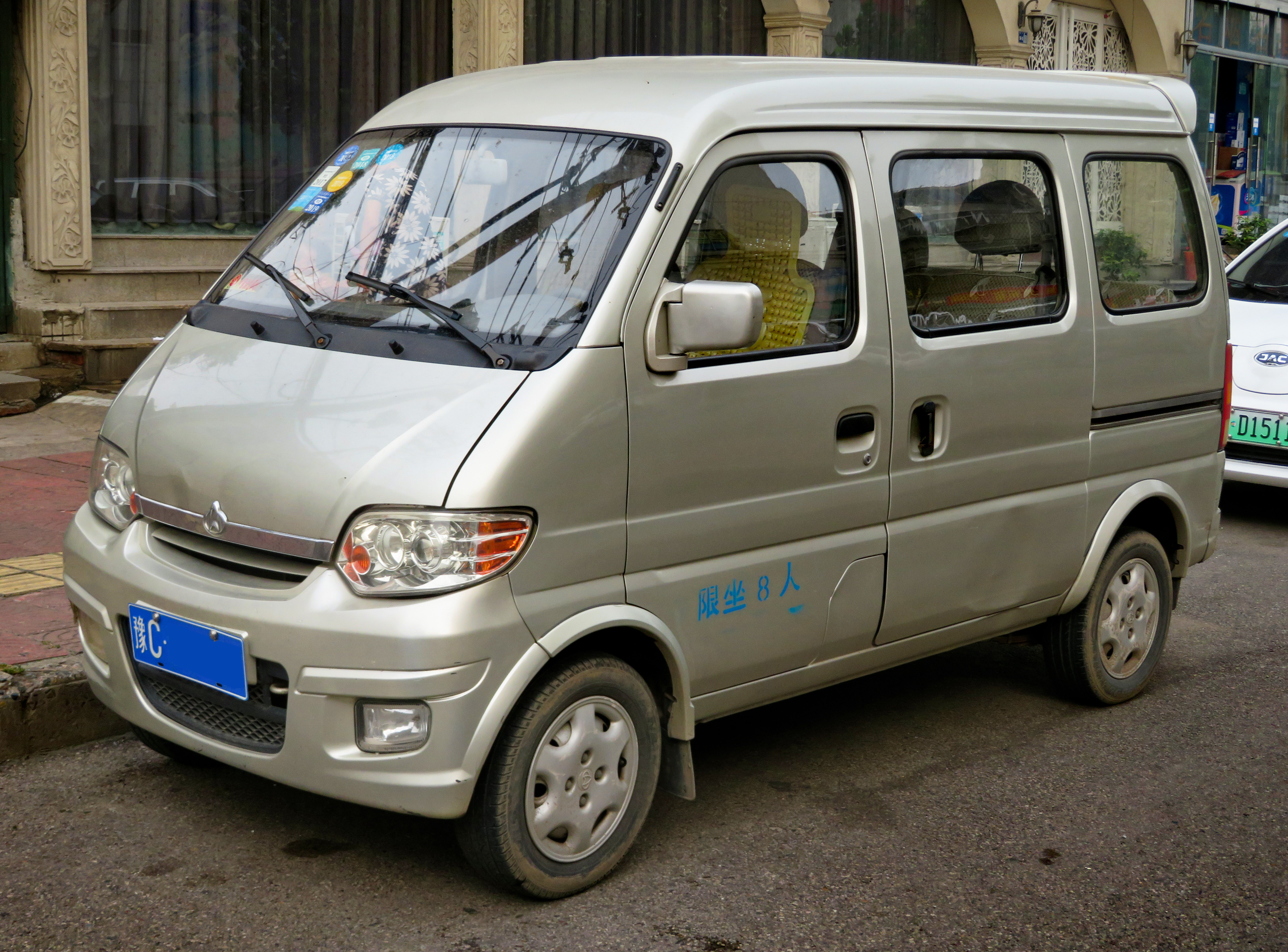
Chana Star

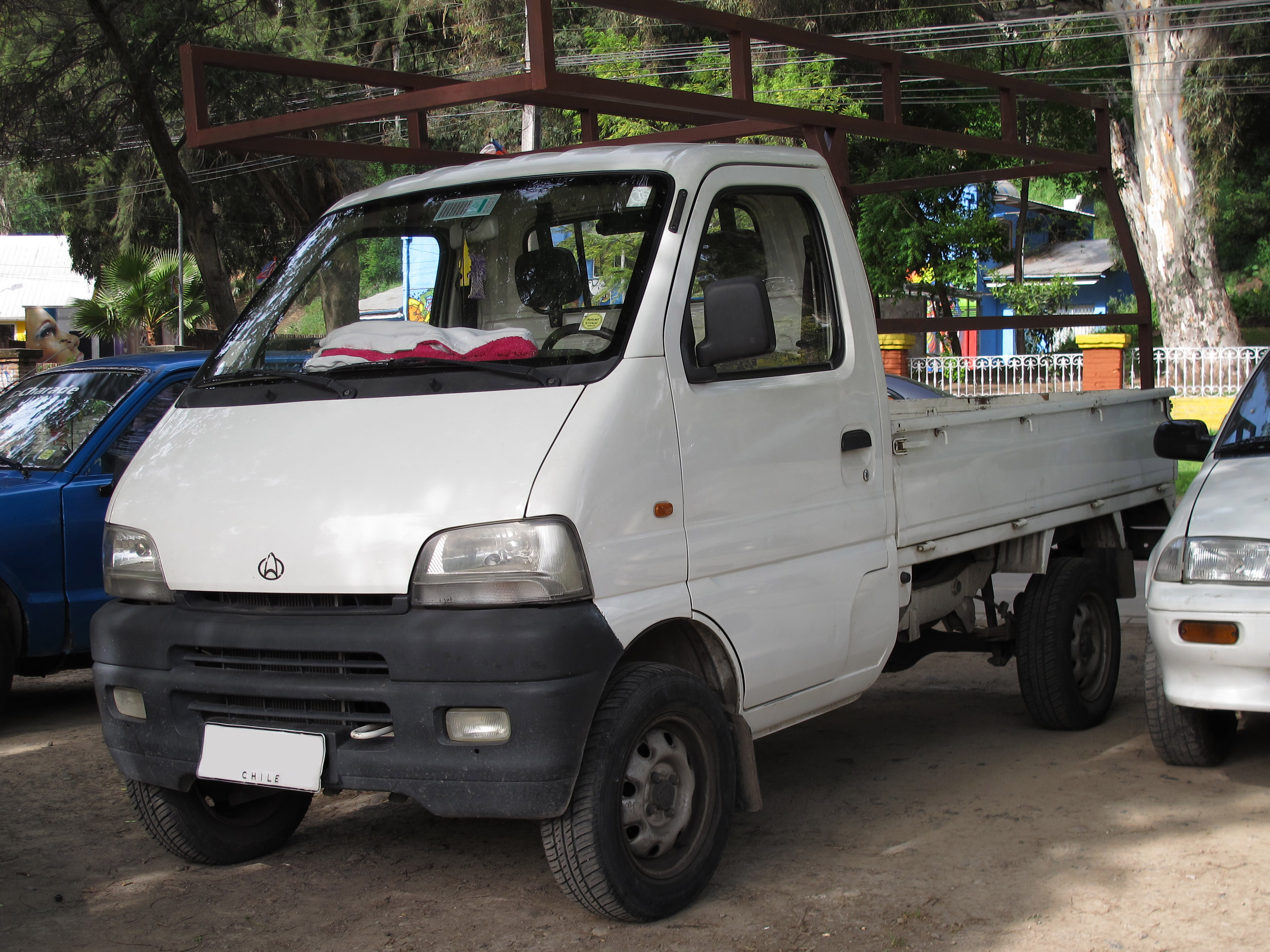
Changan Star

Buses

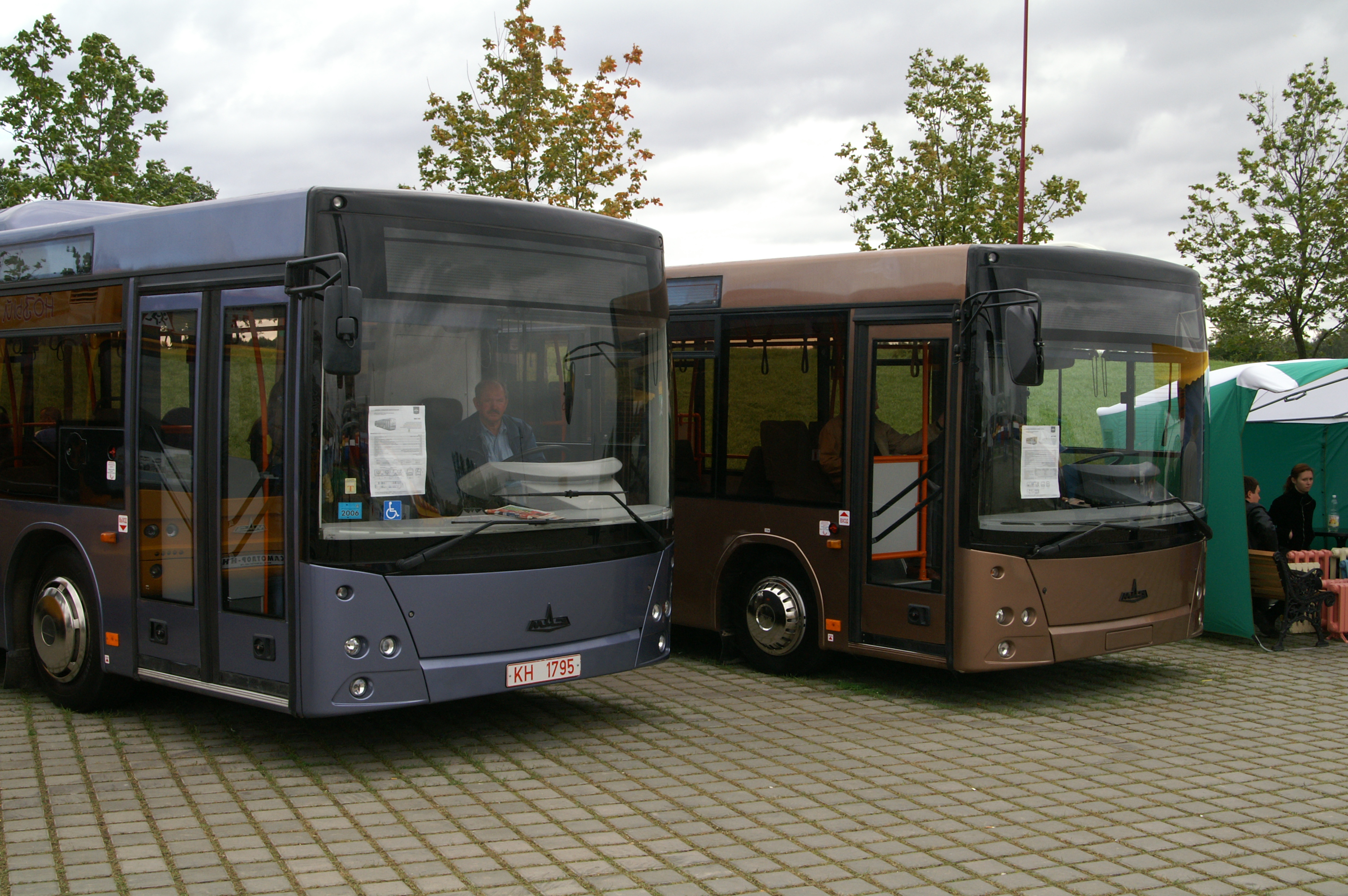
MAZ-203 and MAZ-206 bus

Combine

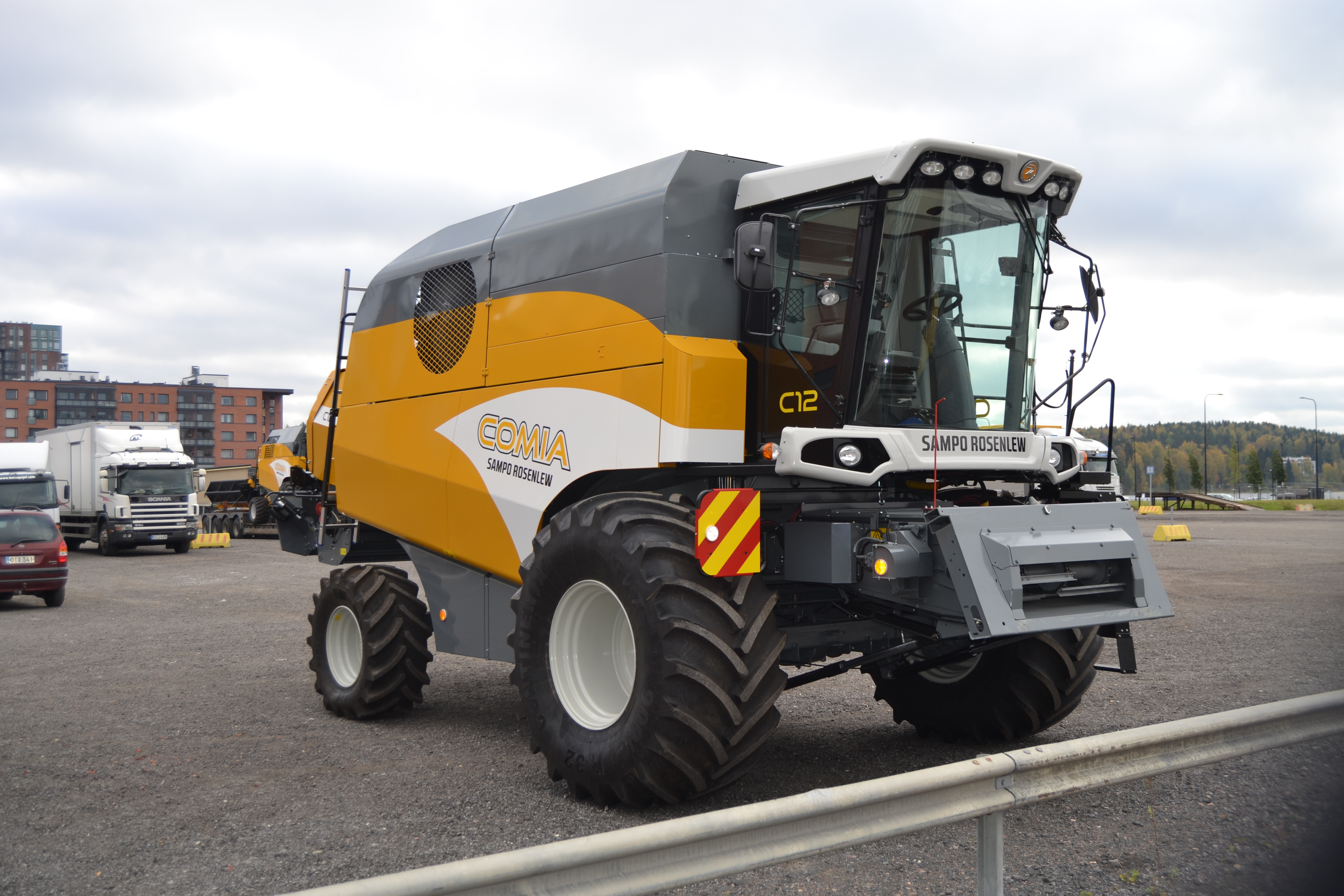
Sampo 2045 Combine

Tractors

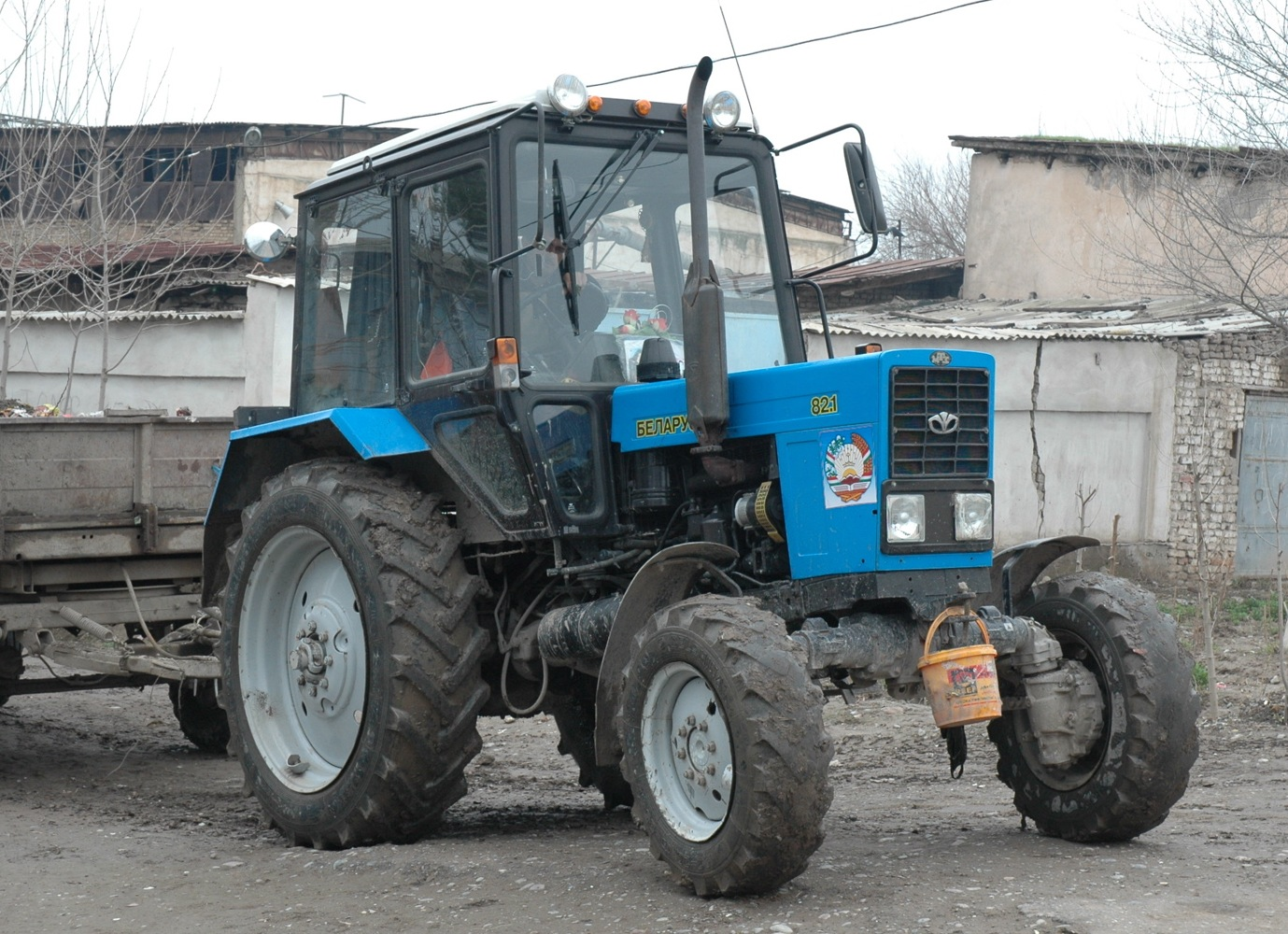
MTZ-82

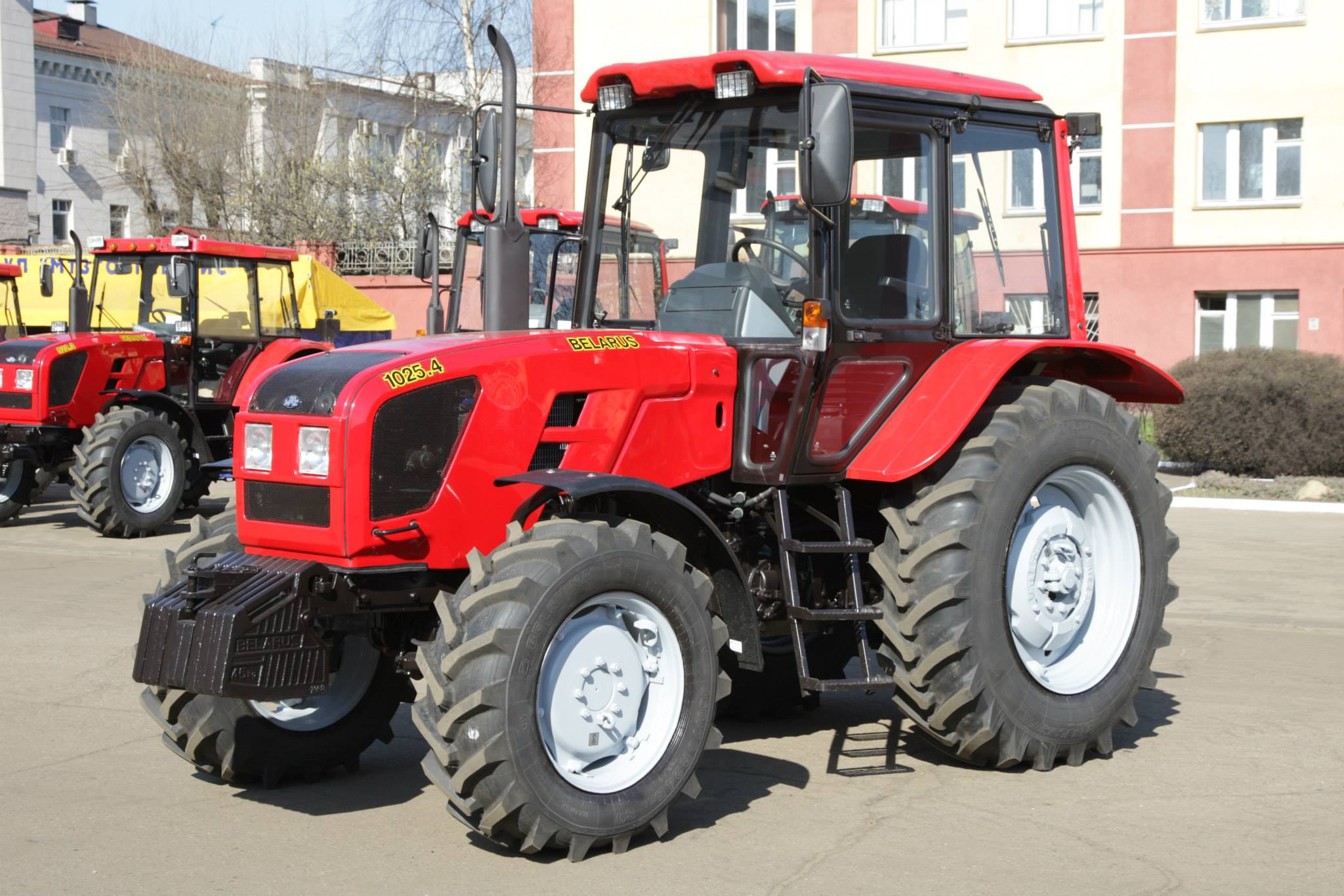
MTZ-1025

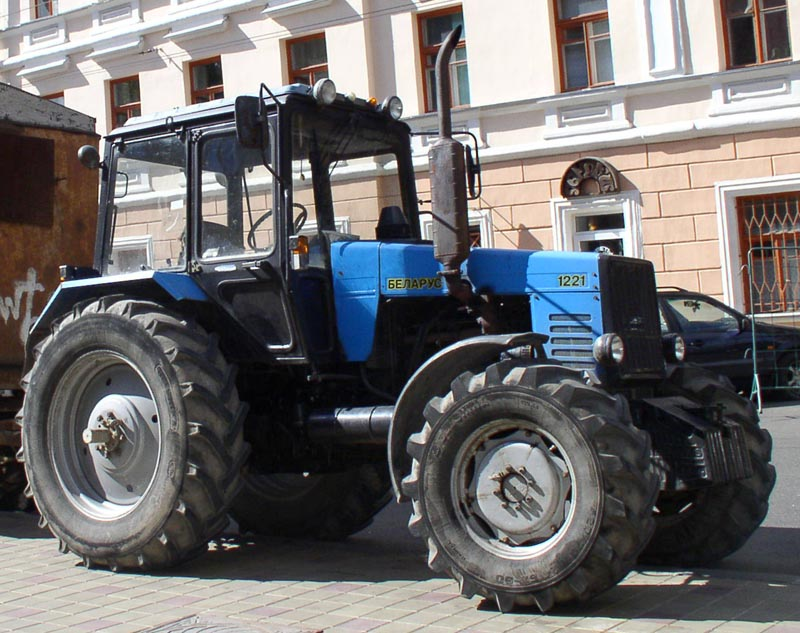
MTZ-1221

== See also ==
- Azsamand
- Nakhchivan Automobile Plant
