= Cma Sampo =

Algerian agricultural machinery manufacturer

Cma Sampo Spa
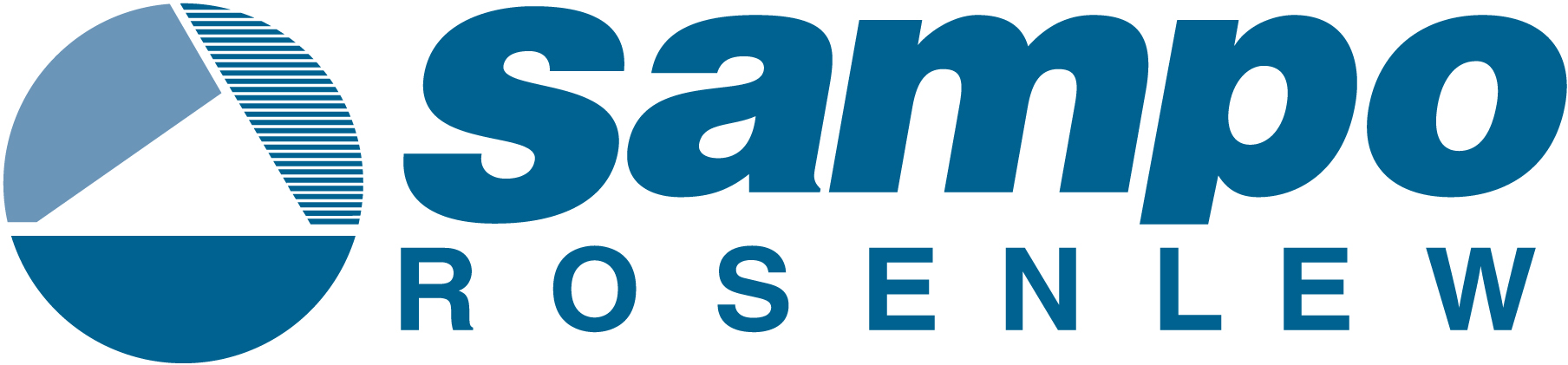
- Company type: Public
- Industry: Agriculture
- Founded: 2010
- Headquarters: Sidi Bel Abbès, Algeria
- Key people: Jussi Malmi (Chairman), Kiari Mohamed (CEO)
- Products: Agricultural machinery, consumer and commercial equipment, financial services, tractors
- Operating income: DZD 2,3 billion (2019)

Cma Sampo Spa is a joint venture company specializing in the development of agricultural vehicles. It was created in 2010 after an agreement between the Algerian brand Cma and the Finnish group Sampo-Rosenlew. It is based in Sidi Bel Abbès, owned by the company Construction Agricultural Equipment (CMA) and the Algerian firm for agricultural equipment manufacturing Pmat (62%) and Finnish partners (38%).

== Products ==
The factory is producing several machines.

- Sampo 2045
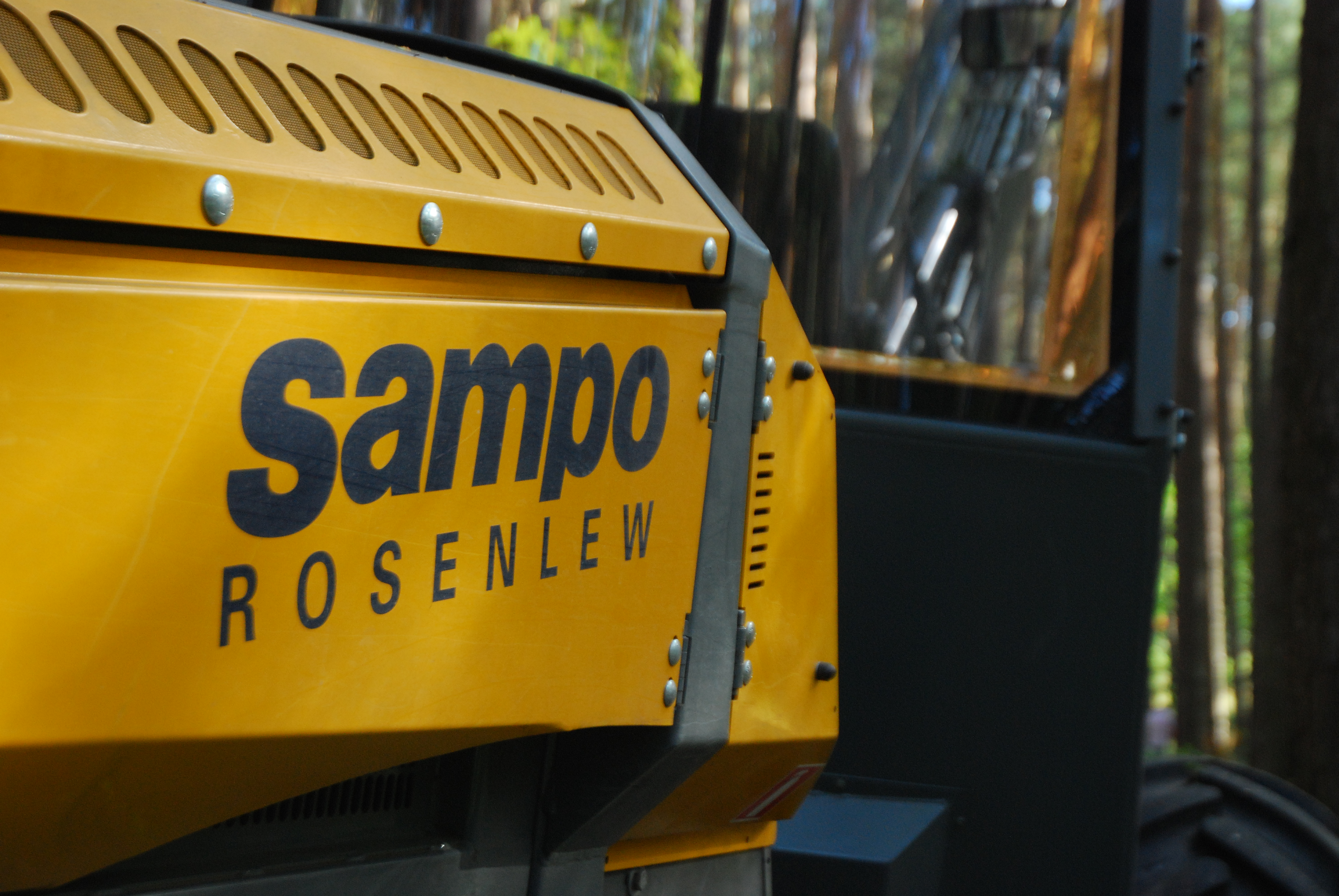

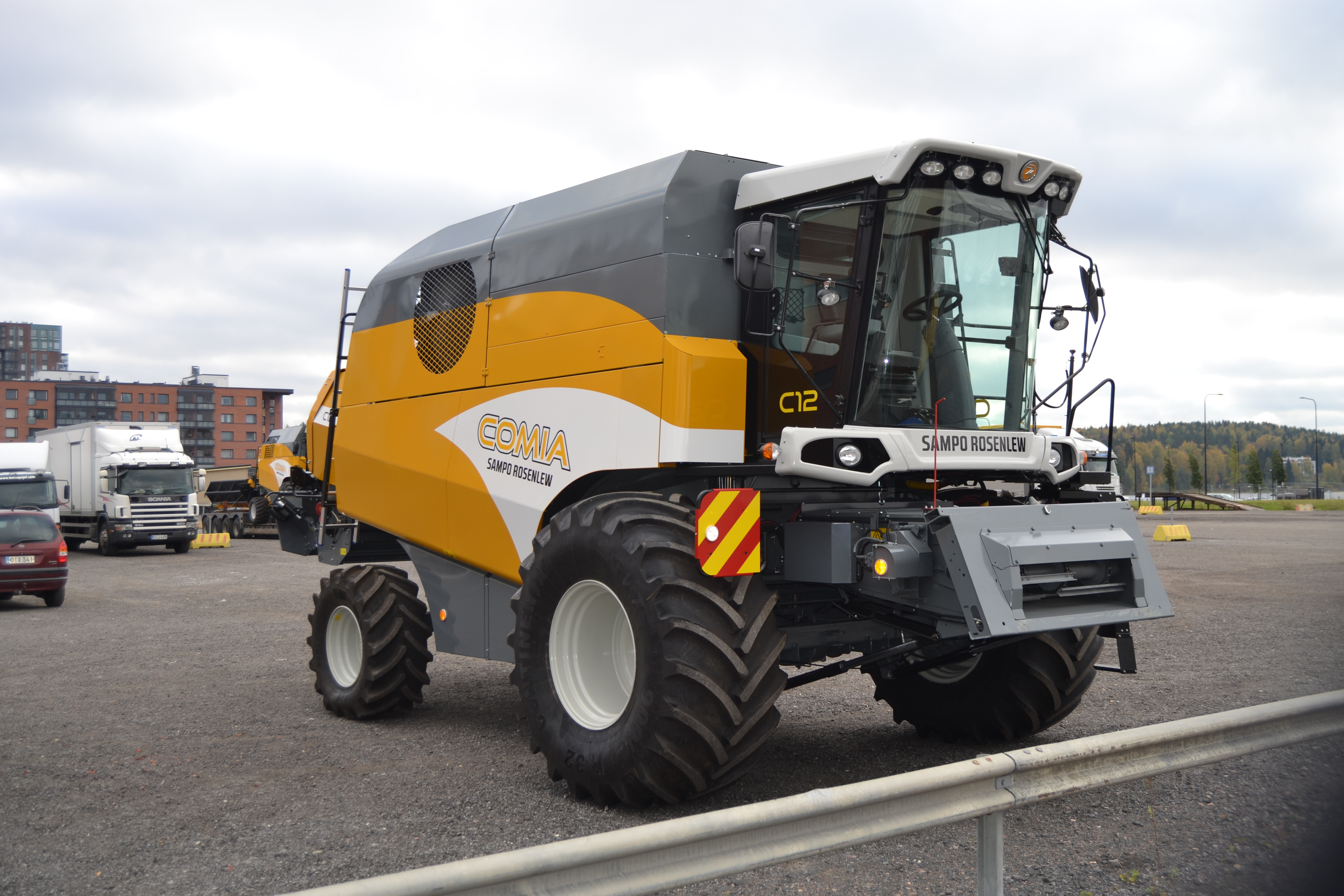

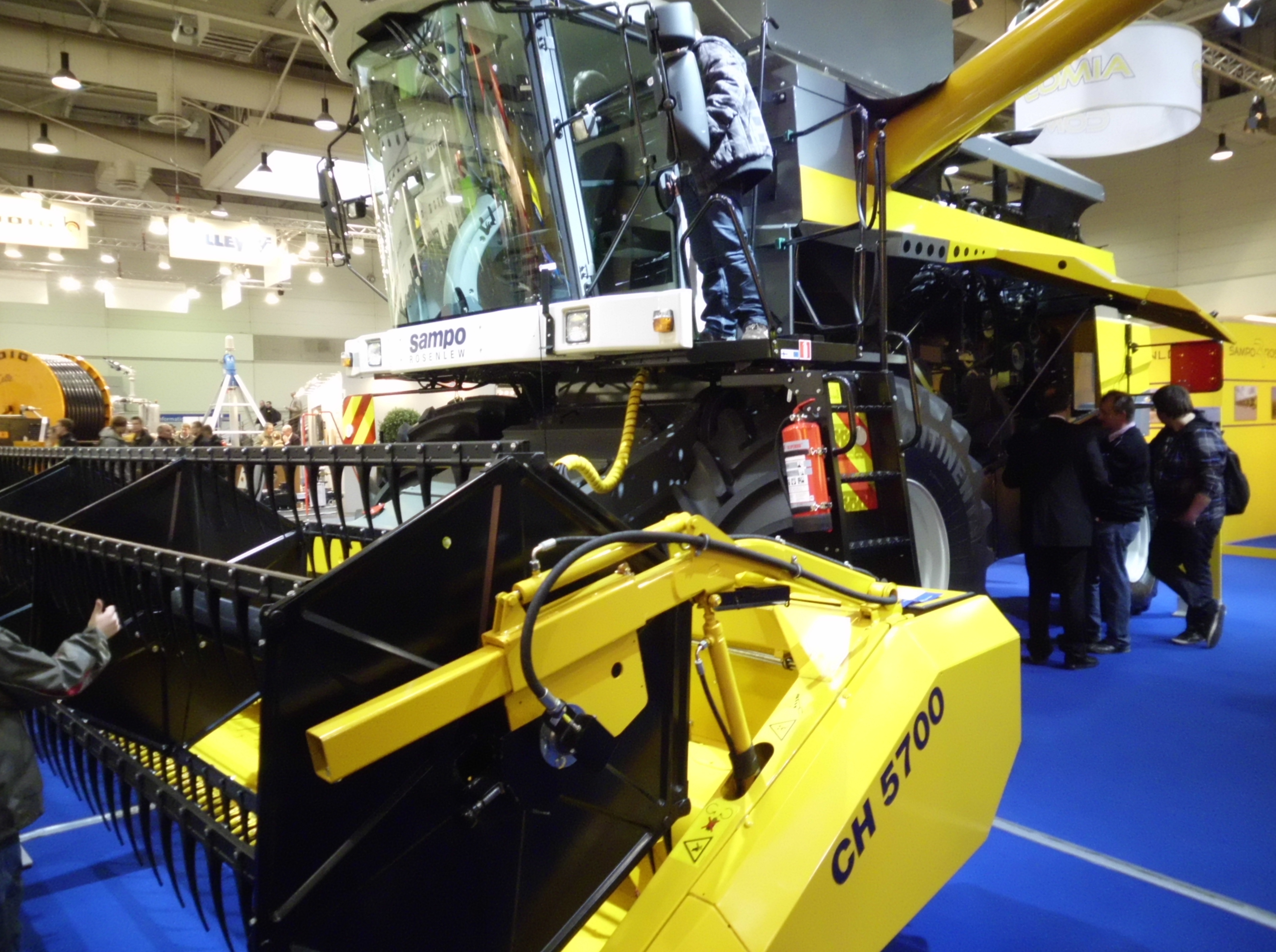

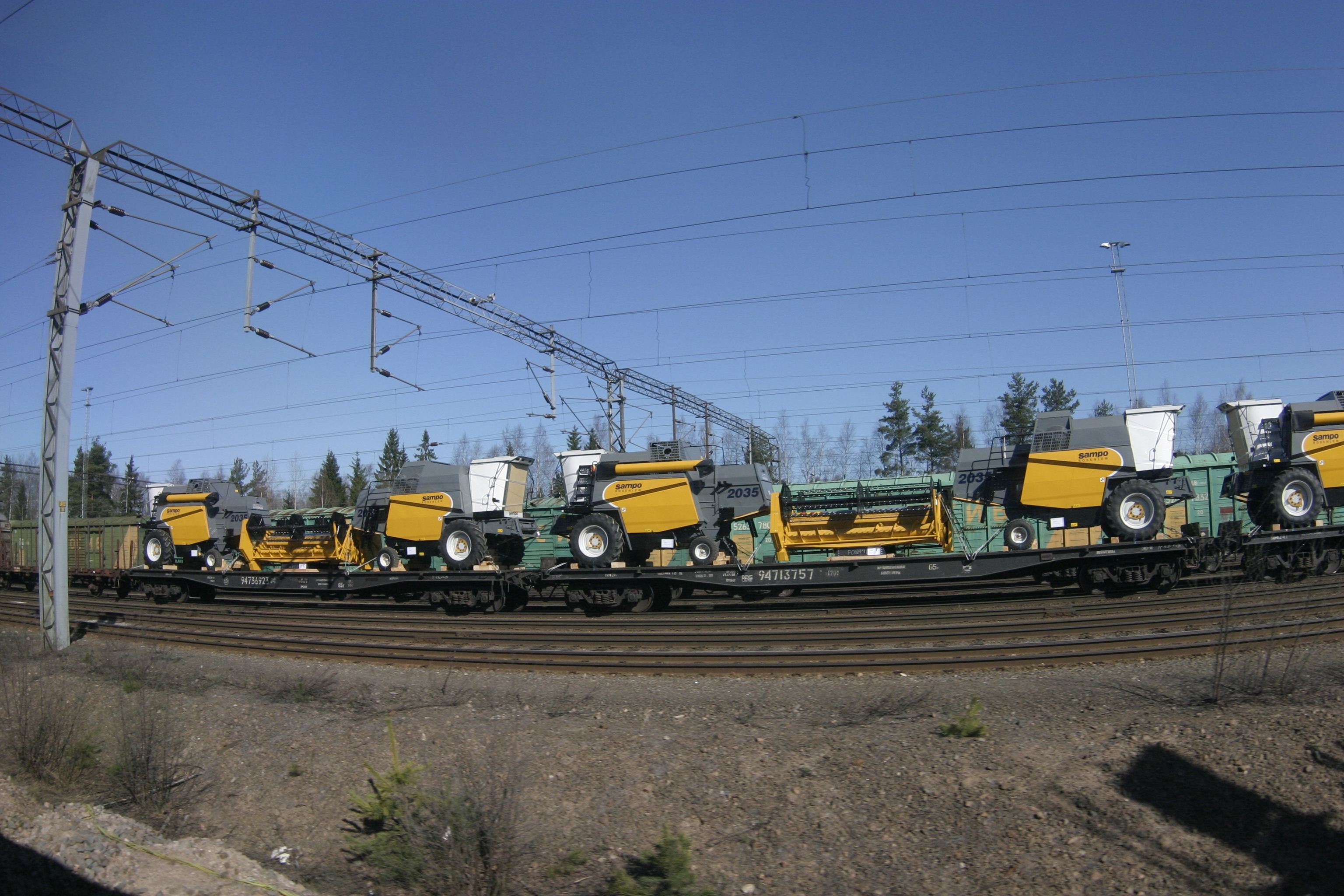
